= Sumerian language =

Language of ancient Sumer and Babylon

Sumerian
- 𒅴𒂠 eme-gir_{15}
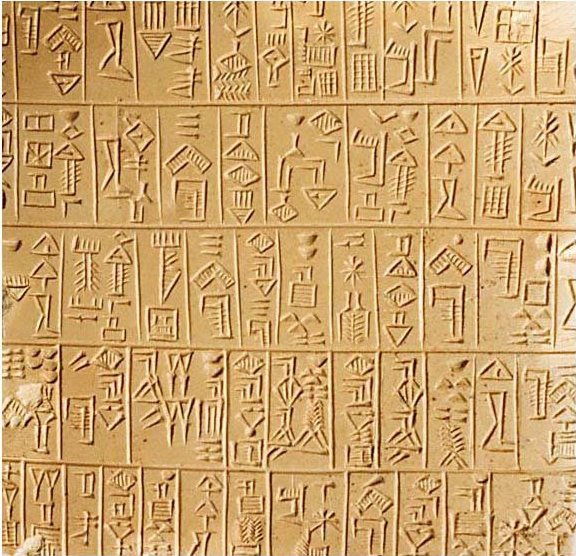
- Native to: Sumer and Akkad
- Region: Mesopotamia (modern-day Iraq)
- Era: Attested from c. 2900 BC. Went out of vernacular use around 1700 BC; used as a classical language until about 100 AD.
- Language family: Language isolate
- Dialects: Emesal; Southern Sumerian; Northern Sumerian
- Writing system: Cuneiform

Language codes
- ISO 639-2: sux
- ISO 639-3: sux
- Glottolog: sume1241

Sumerian (Sumerian: 𒅴𒂠, romanized: eme-gir_{15}, lit. 'native language' (Note: Also written 𒅴𒄀 eme-gi.)) was the language of ancient Sumer. It is the oldest attested language, dating back to at least 3100 BC, perhaps earlier. It is a local language isolate, thus unrelated to any other known language, that was spoken exclusively in ancient Mesopotamia, in the area that is now modern-day Iraq.

Sumerian is read from left to right, from the top; however early inscriptions were read top to bottom from the right.

Akkadian, a Semitic language, gradually replaced Sumerian as the primary spoken language in the area c. 2000 BC (the exact date is debated), but Sumerian continued to be used as a sacred, ceremonial, literary, and scientific language in Akkadian-speaking Mesopotamian states, such as Assyria and Babylonia, until the 1st century AD. Afterwards, it seems to have fallen into obscurity until the 19th century, when Assyriologists began deciphering the cuneiform inscriptions and excavated tablets that had been left by its speakers.

In spite of its extinction, Sumerian exerted a significant influence on the languages of the area. The cuneiform script, originally used for Sumerian, was widely adopted by numerous regional languages such as its fellow Mesopotamian Akkadian, as well as Elamite, Eblaite, Amorite, Hittite, Hurrian, Luwian, Aramaic and Urartian; it similarly inspired the Old Persian alphabet which was used to write the eponymous language. The influence was perhaps the greatest on Akkadian, whose grammar and vocabulary were significantly influenced by Sumerian, and vice versa.

== Stages ==
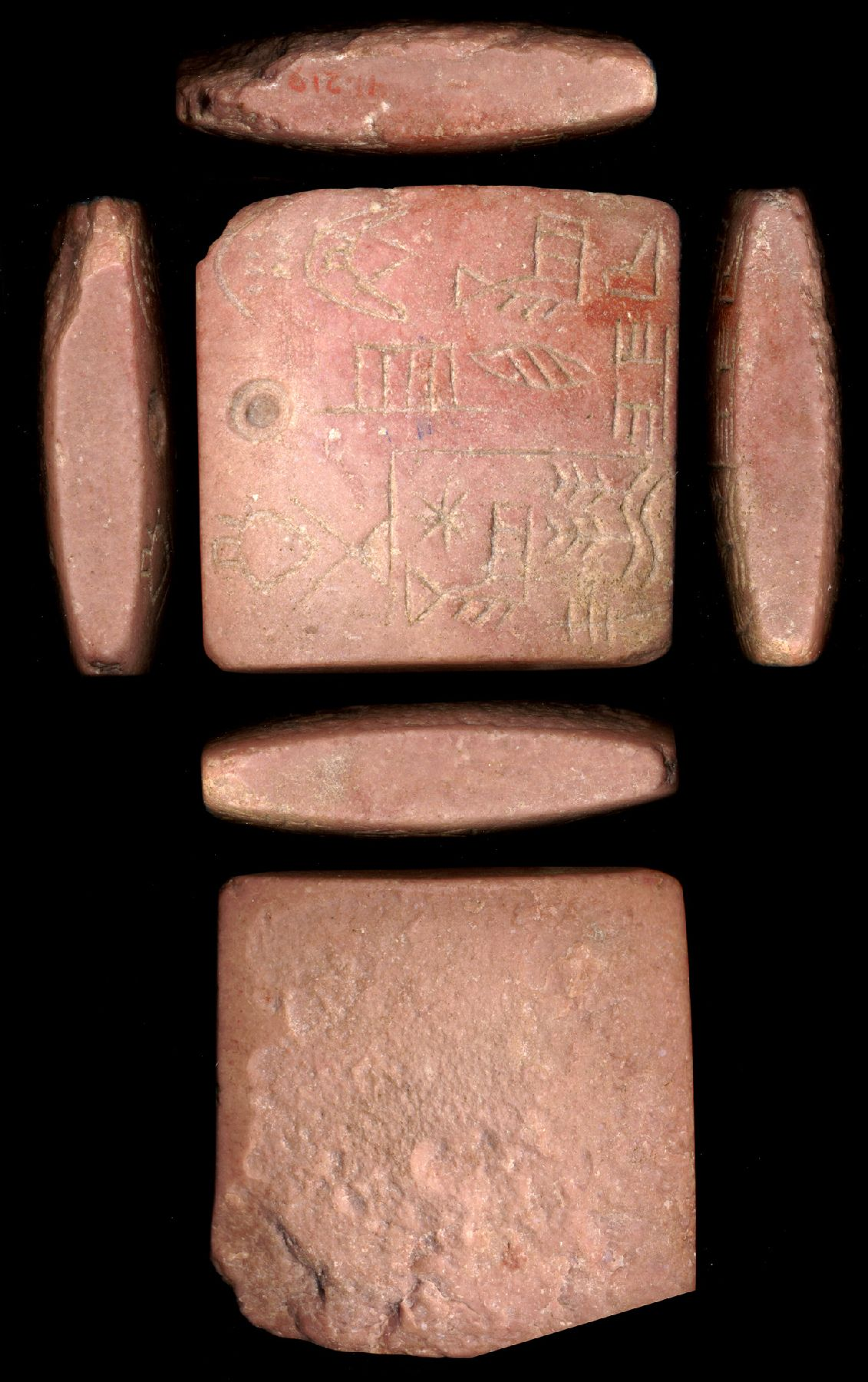
This proto-literate tablet (c. 3100 – 2900 BC) records the transfer of a piece of land (Walters Art Museum, Baltimore).

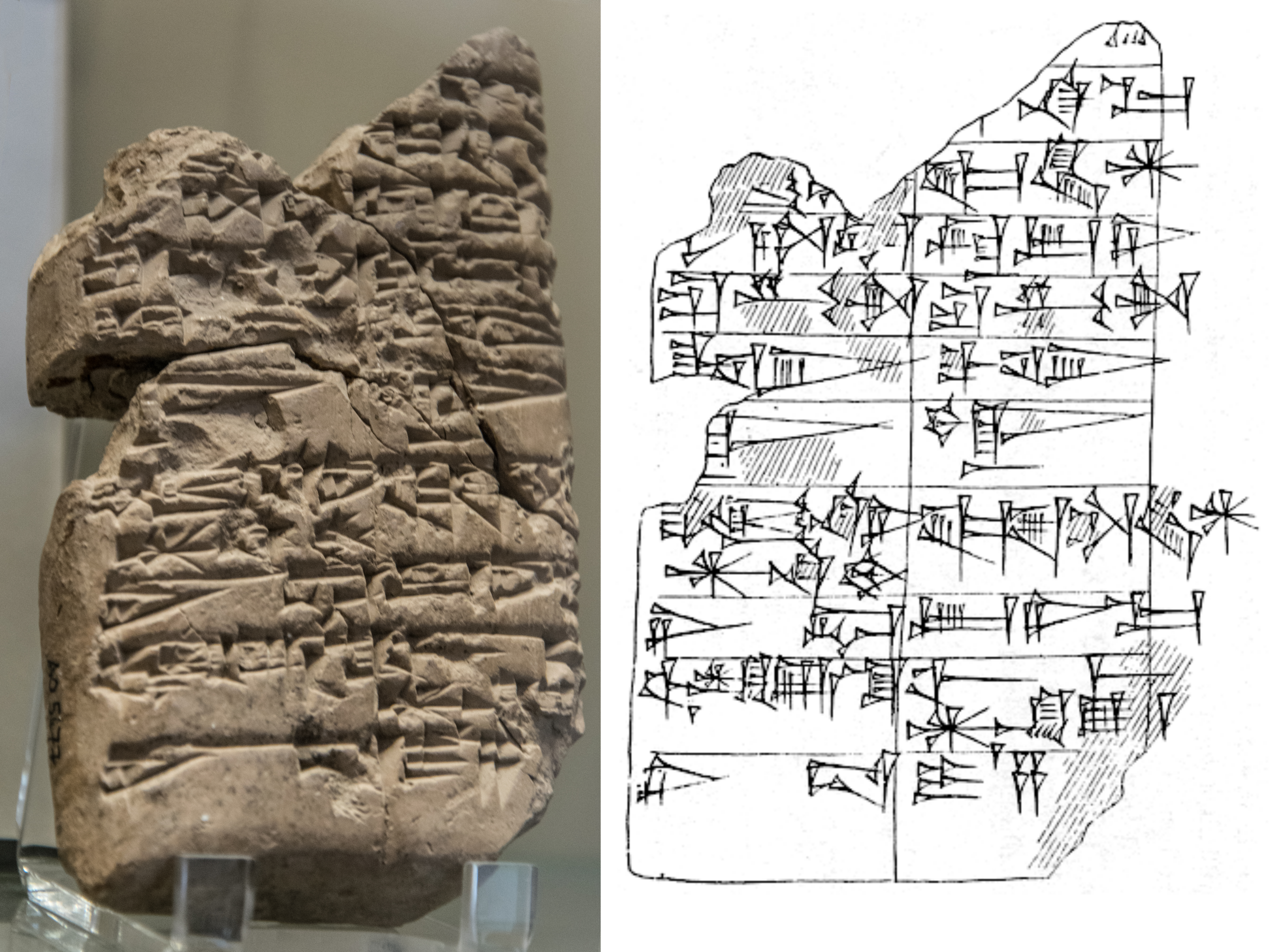
The first known Sumerian–Akkadian bilingual tablet dates from the reign of Rimush. Louvre Museum AO 5477. The top half is in Sumerian, the bottom half is its translation in Akkadian.

The history of written Sumerian can be divided into several periods:

- Proto-literate period – c. 3100 BC to c. 3000 BC
- Archaic Sumerian – c. 3000 BC to c. 2500 BC
- Old or Classical Sumerian – c. 2500 BC to c. 2350 BC
- Old Akkadian Sumerian – c. 2350 – 2200 BC
- Neo-Sumerian – c. 2200 BC to c. 2000 BC, further divided into:
  - Early Neo-Sumerian (Lagash II period) – c. 2200 BC to c. 2100 BC
  - Late Neo-Sumerian (Ur III period) – c. 2100 BC to c. 2000 BC
- Old Babylonian Sumerian – c. 2000 BC to c. 1600 BC
- Post-Old Babylonian Sumerian – after c. 1600 BC.

The pictographic writing system used during the proto-literate period (3200 BC – 3000 BC), corresponding to the Uruk III and Uruk IV periods in archeology, was still so rudimentary that there remains some scholarly disagreement about whether the language written with it is Sumerian at all; although it has been argued that there are some, albeit still very rare, cases of phonetic indicators and spelling that show this to be the case. The texts from this period are mostly administrative; there are also a number of sign lists, which were apparently used for the training of scribes.

The next period, Archaic Sumerian (3000 BC – 2500 BC), is the first stage of inscriptions that indicate grammatical elements, so the identification of the language is certain. It includes some administrative texts and sign lists from Ur (c. 2800 BC). Texts from Shuruppak and Abu Salabikh from 2600 to 2500 BC (the so-called Fara period or Early Dynastic Period IIIa) are the first to span a greater variety of genres, including not only administrative texts and sign lists, but also incantations, legal and literary texts (including proverbs and early versions of the famous works The Instructions of Shuruppak and The Kesh temple hymn). However, the spelling of grammatical elements remains optional, making the interpretation and linguistic analysis of these texts difficult.

The Old Sumerian period (2500–2350 BC) is the first one from which well-understood texts survive. It corresponds mostly to the last part of the Early Dynastic period (ED IIIb) and specifically to the First Dynasty of Lagash, from where the overwhelming majority of surviving texts come. The sources include important royal inscriptions with historical content as well as extensive administrative records. Sometimes included in the Old Sumerian stage is also the Old Akkadian period (c. 2350 BC – c. 2200 BC), during which Mesopotamia, including Sumer, was united under the rule of the Akkadian Empire. At this time Akkadian functioned as the primary official language, but texts in Sumerian (primarily administrative) did continue to be produced as well.

The first phase of the Neo-Sumerian period corresponds to the time of Gutian rule in Mesopotamia; the most important sources come from the autonomous Second Dynasty of Lagash, especially from the rule of Gudea, which has produced extensive royal inscriptions. The second phase corresponds to the unification of Mesopotamia under the Third Dynasty of Ur, which oversaw a "renaissance" in the use of Sumerian throughout Mesopotamia, using it as its sole official written language. There is a wealth of texts greater than from any preceding time – besides the extremely detailed and meticulous administrative records, there are numerous royal inscriptions, legal documents, letters and incantations. In spite of the dominant position of written Sumerian during the Ur III dynasty, it is controversial to what extent it was actually spoken or had already gone extinct in most parts of its empire. Some facts have been interpreted as suggesting that many scribes and even the royal court actually used Akkadian as their main spoken and native language. On the other hand, evidence has been adduced to the effect that Sumerian continued to be spoken natively and even remained dominant as an everyday language in Southern Babylonia, including Nippur and the area to its south.

By the Old Babylonian period (c. 2000 – c. 1600 BC), Akkadian had clearly supplanted Sumerian as a spoken language in nearly all of its original territory, whereas Sumerian continued its existence as a liturgical and classical language for religious, artistic and scholarly purposes. In addition, it has been argued that Sumerian persisted as a spoken language at least in a small part of Southern Mesopotamia (Nippur and its surroundings) at least until about 1900 BC and possibly until as late as 1700 BC. Nonetheless, it seems clear that by far the majority of scribes writing in Sumerian in this point were not native speakers and errors resulting from their Akkadian mother tongue become apparent. For this reason, this period as well as the remaining time during which Sumerian was written are sometimes referred to as the "Post-Sumerian" period. The written language of administration, law and royal inscriptions continued to be Sumerian in the undoubtedly Semitic-speaking successor states of Ur III during the so-called Isin-Larsa period (c. 2000 BC – c. 1750 BC). (Note: Of the 29 royal inscriptions of the late second millennium BC Second Dynasty of Isin about half were in Sumerian, described as "hypersophisticated classroom Sumerian".) The Old Babylonian Empire, however, mostly used Akkadian in inscriptions, sometimes adding Sumerian versions.

The Old Babylonian period, especially its early part, has produced extremely numerous and varied Sumerian literary texts: myths, epics, hymns, prayers, wisdom literature and letters. In fact, nearly all preserved Sumerian religious and wisdom literature and the overwhelming majority of surviving manuscripts of Sumerian literary texts in general can be dated to that time, and it is often seen as the "classical age" of Sumerian literature. Conversely, far more literary texts on tablets surviving from the Old Babylonian period are in Sumerian than in Akkadian, even though that time is viewed as the classical period of Babylonian culture and language. However, it has sometimes been suggested that many or most of these "Old Babylonian Sumerian" texts may be copies of works that were originally composed in the preceding Ur III period or earlier, and some copies or fragments of known compositions or literary genres have indeed been found in tablets of Neo-Sumerian and Old Sumerian provenance. In addition, some of the first bilingual Sumerian–Akkadian lexical lists are preserved from that time (although the lists were still usually monolingual and Akkadian translations did not become common until the late Middle Babylonian period) and there are also grammatical texts – essentially bilingual paradigms listing Sumerian grammatical forms and their postulated Akkadian equivalents.

After the Old Babylonian period or, according to some, as early as 1700 BC, the active use of Sumerian declined. Scribes did continue to produce texts in Sumerian at a more modest scale, but generally with interlinear Akkadian translations and only part of the literature known in the Old Babylonian period continued to be copied after its end around 1600 BC. During the Middle Babylonian period, approximately from 1600 to 1000 BC, the Kassite rulers continued to use Sumerian in many of their inscriptions, but Akkadian seems to have taken the place of Sumerian as the primary language of texts used for the training of scribes and their Sumerian itself acquires an increasingly artificial and Akkadian-influenced form. In some cases a text may not even have been meant to be read in Sumerian; instead, it may have functioned as a prestigious way of "encoding" Akkadian via Sumerograms (cf. Japanese kanbun). Nonetheless, the study of Sumerian and copying of Sumerian texts remained an integral part of scribal education and literary culture of Mesopotamia and surrounding societies influenced by it (Note: Interestingly, the poorly documented Sealand Dynasty (c. 1732–1460 BC), which ruled in a region in Southern Mesopotamia corresponding to historical Sumer, appears to have particularly favoured Sumerian; Sumerian school documents from that time were found at Tell Khaiber, some of which contain year names from the reign of a king with the Sumerian throne name Aya-dara-galama.) and it retained that role until the eclipse of the tradition of cuneiform literacy itself in the beginning of the Common Era. The most popular genres for Sumerian texts after the Old Babylonian period were incantations, liturgical texts and proverbs; among longer texts, the classics Lugal-e and An-gim were most commonly copied.

== Classification ==
Sumerian is a language isolate. At one time it was widely held to be an Indo-European language, but that view has been almost universally rejected. Since decipherment began in the early 20th century, scholars have tried to relate Sumerian to a wide variety of languages. Because of its prestige as the first attested written language, proposals for linguistic affinity often have a nationalistic flavour. Attempts have been made without success to link Sumerian with a range of widely disparate groups such as Indo-European, Austroasiatic, Dravidian, Uralic, Sino-Tibetan, Bolgar and Turkic (the last being promoted by Turkish nationalists as part of the Sun language theory). Additionally, long-range proposals have attempted to include Sumerian in broad macrofamilies, often including other notable isolates like Basque or small families like Koreanic. Such proposals enjoy virtually no support among modern linguists, Sumerologists, or Assyriologists, and are typically seen as fringe theories due to their unverifiability.

It has also been suggested that the Sumerian language descended from a late prehistoric creole language. However, no conclusive evidence beyond a handful of typological features can be found to support this view. A more widespread hypothesis posits a Proto-Euphratean language family that preceded Sumerian in Mesopotamia and exerted an areal influence on it, especially in the form of polysyllabic words that appear "un-Sumerian"—making them suspect of being loanwords—and are not traceable to any other known language family. There is little speculation as to the affinities of this hypothetical substratum language, or these languages, and some scholars prefer to treat Sumerian as unclassified. Other researchers disagree with the assumption of a single substratum language and argue that several languages are involved. A related proposal by Gordon Whittaker is that the language of the proto-literary texts from the Late Uruk period (c. 3350–3100 BC) is really an early extinct branch of Indo-European language which he terms "Euphratic" which somehow emerged long before the accepted timeline for the spread of Indo-European into West Asia, though this is rejected by mainstream opinion which accepts Sumerian as a language isolate.

== Writing system ==
=== Development ===
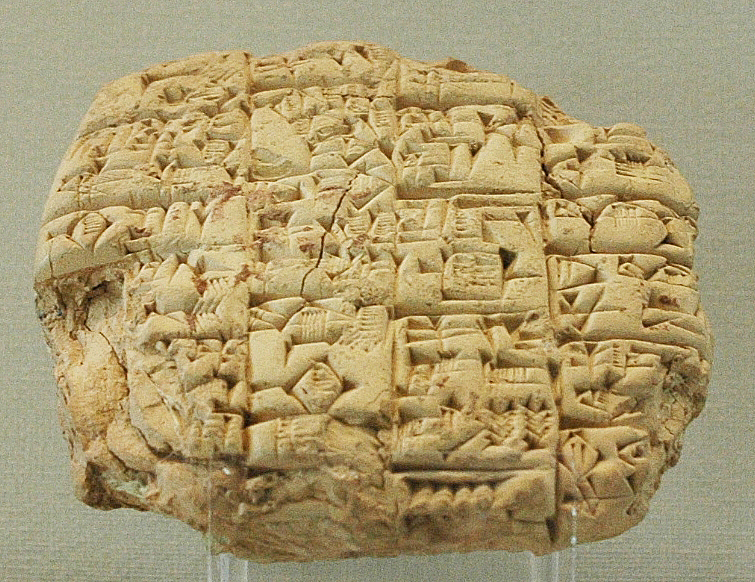
Letter sent by the high-priest Lu'enna to the king of Lagash (maybe Urukagina), informing him of his son's death in combat, c. 2400 BC, found in Telloh (ancient Girsu)

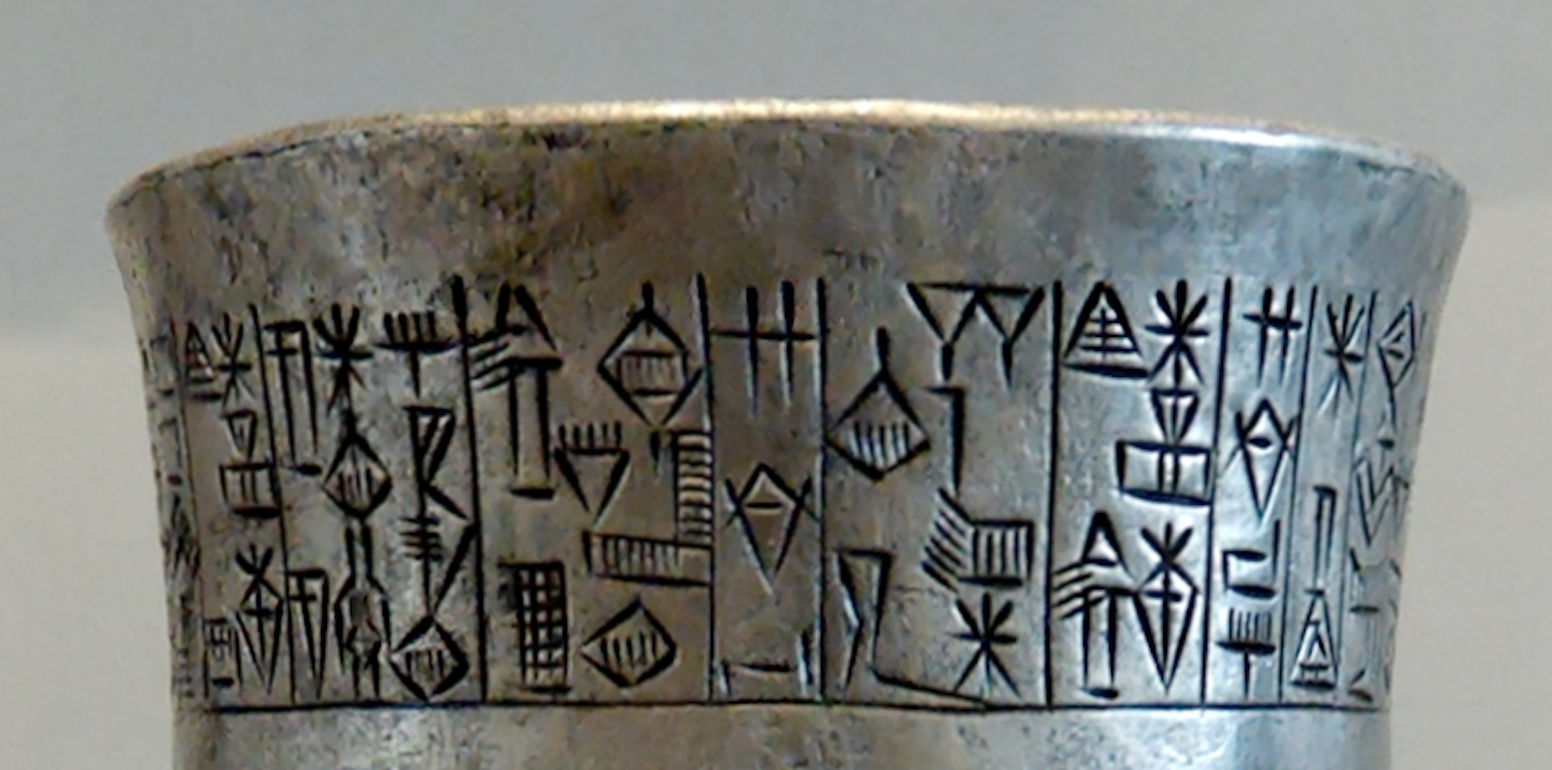
Vase of Entemena, king of Lagash, with dedication. Louvre AO2674, c. 2400 BC

Pictographic proto-writing was used in Mesopotamia starting in c. 3300 BC. It is unclear what underlying language it encoded, if any. By c. 2800 BC, some tablets began using syllabic elements that clearly indicated a relation to the Sumerian language. Around 2600 BC, cuneiform symbols were developed using a wedge-shaped stylus to impress the shapes into wet clay. This cuneiform ("wedge-shaped") mode of writing co-existed with the proto-cuneiform archaic mode. Deimel (1922) lists 870 signs used in the Early Dynastic IIIa period (26th century). In the same period the large set of logographic signs had been simplified into a logosyllabic script comprising several hundred signs. Rosengarten (1967) lists 468 signs used in Sumerian (pre-Sargonian) Lagash.

The cuneiform script was adapted to Akkadian writing beginning in the mid-third millennium. Over the long period of bilingual overlap of active Sumerian and Akkadian usage the two languages influenced each other, as reflected in numerous loanwords and even word order changes.

=== Transliteration ===
Depending on the context, a cuneiform sign can be read either as one of several possible logograms (each of which corresponds to a word in the Sumerian spoken language), as a phonetic syllable (V, VC, CV, or CVC), or as a determinative (a marker of semantic category, such as occupation or place). Some Sumerian logograms were written with multiple cuneiform signs. These logograms are called diri-spellings, after the logogram 𒋛𒀀 DIRI which is written with the signs 𒋛 SI and 𒀀 A. The text transliteration of a tablet will show just the logogram, such as the word dirig, not the separate component signs.

Not all epigraphists are equally reliable, and before publication of an important treatment of a text, scholars will often arrange to collate the published transliteration against the actual tablet, to see if any signs, especially broken or damaged signs, should be represented differently.

Knowledge of the readings of Sumerian signs is based, to a great extent, on lexical lists made for Akkadian speakers, where they are expressed by means of syllabic signs. The established readings were originally based on lexical lists from the Neo-Babylonian Period, which were found in the 19th century; in the 20th century, earlier lists from the Old Babylonian Period were published and some researchers in the 21st century have switched to using readings from them. (Note: For words occurring in this article, proposed revised readings based on Old Babylonian lexical lists are ambar > abbar, banšur > bansur, daḫ > taḫ, diš > deš, eden > edin, gig_{2} > geg_{2}, imin > umun_{7}, inim > enim, lagaš > lagas, nig̃in > nig̃en, ninda > inda, sa_{4} > še_{21}, ugu_{2} > ^{a}agu_{2}, and zaḫ_{3} > saḫ_{7}.) There is also variation in the degree to which so-called "Auslauts" or "amissable consonants" (morpheme-final consonants that stopped being pronounced at one point or another in the history of Sumerian) are reflected in the transliterations. This article generally uses the versions with expressed Auslauts.

== Historiography ==
Sumero-Akkadian cuneiform syllabary
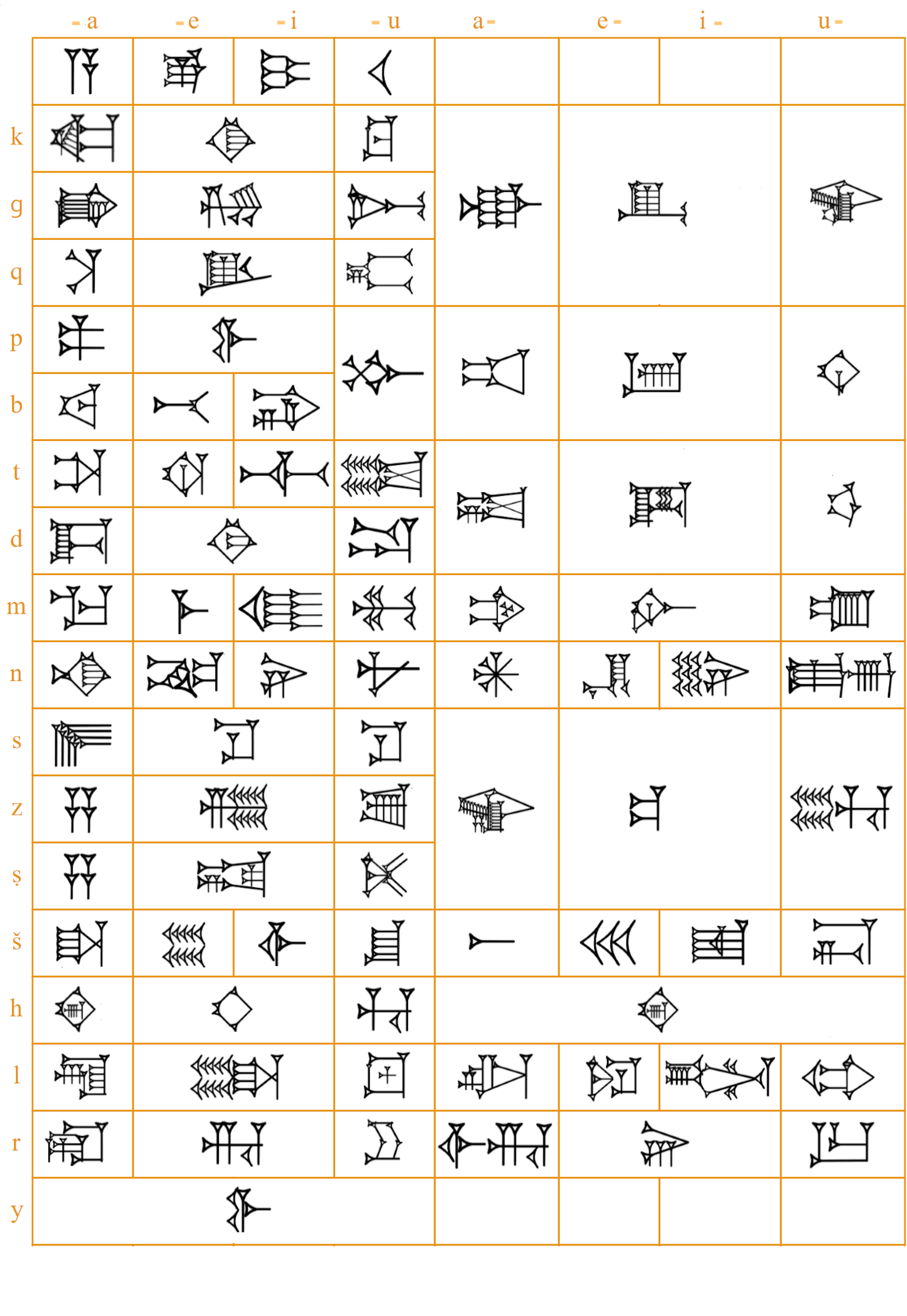
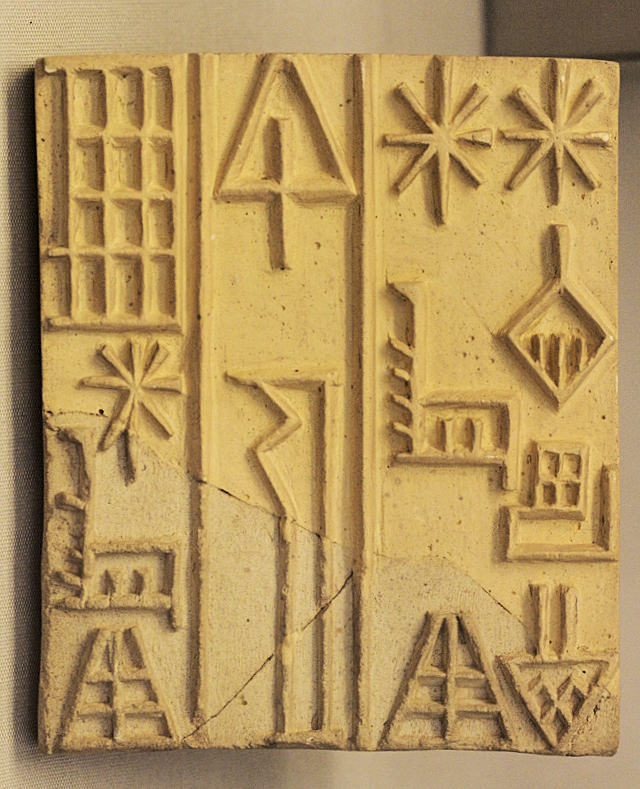
Left: Sumero-Akkadian cuneiform syllabary, used by early Akkadian rulers. Right: Brick stamp of Akkadian Empire ruler Naram-Sin (reversed for readability), c. 2250 BC. The name of Naram-Sin (Akkadian: 𒀭𒈾𒊏𒄠𒀭𒂗𒍪: ^{D}Na-ra-am ^{D}Sîn, Sîn being written 𒂗𒍪 EN.ZU), appears vertically in the right column. British Museum.

The key to reading logosyllabic cuneiform came from the Behistun inscription, a trilingual cuneiform inscription written in Old Persian, Elamite and Akkadian. (In a similar manner, the key to understanding Egyptian hieroglyphs was the bilingual [Greek and Egyptian with the Egyptian text in two scripts] Rosetta stone and Jean-François Champollion's transcription in 1822.)

In 1838 Henry Rawlinson, building on the 1802 work of Georg Friedrich Grotefend, was able to decipher the Old Persian section of the Behistun inscriptions, using his knowledge of modern Persian. When he recovered the rest of the text in 1843, he and others were gradually able to translate the Elamite and Akkadian sections of it, starting with the 37 signs he had deciphered for the Old Persian. Meanwhile, many more cuneiform texts were coming to light from archaeological excavations, mostly in the Semitic Akkadian language, which were duly deciphered.

By 1850, however, Edward Hincks came to suspect a non-Semitic origin for cuneiform. Semitic languages are structured according to consonantal forms, whereas cuneiform, when functioning phonetically, was a syllabary, binding consonants to particular vowels. Furthermore, no Semitic words could be found to explain the syllabic values given to particular signs. Julius Oppert suggested that a non-Semitic language had preceded Akkadian in Mesopotamia, and that speakers of this language had developed the cuneiform script.

In 1855 Rawlinson announced the discovery of non-Semitic inscriptions at the southern Babylonian sites of Nippur, Larsa, and Uruk.

In 1856, Hincks argued that the untranslated language was agglutinative in character. The language was called Scythic by some, and, confusingly, Akkadian by others. On 17 January 1869, Oppert proposed before the French Society of Numismatics and Archeology the name Sumerian, based on the known title "King of Sumer and Akkad", reasoning that if Akkad signified the Semitic portion of the kingdom, Sumer might describe the non-Semitic annex. This new designation, however, was not immediately adopted by all cuneiformists, and the name Akkadian still remained in use for several decades before Sumerian became the established name for the non-Semitic language.

Credit for being first to scientifically treat a bilingual Sumerian–Akkadian text belongs to Paul Haupt, who published Die sumerischen Familiengesetze (The Sumerian family laws) in 1879.

Ernest de Sarzec began excavating the Sumerian site of Tello (ancient Girsu, capital of the state of Lagash) in 1877, and published the first part of Découvertes en Chaldée with transcriptions of Sumerian tablets in 1884. The University of Pennsylvania began excavating Sumerian Nippur in 1888.

A Classified List of Sumerian Ideographs by R. Brünnow appeared in 1889.

The bewildering number and variety of phonetic values that signs could have in Sumerian led to a detour in understanding the language – a Paris-based orientalist, Joseph Halévy, argued from 1874 onward that Sumerian was not a natural language, but rather a secret code (a cryptolect), and for over a decade the leading Assyriologists battled over this issue. For a dozen years, starting in 1885, Friedrich Delitzsch accepted Halévy's arguments, not renouncing Halévy until 1897.

François Thureau-Dangin working at the Louvre in Paris also made significant contributions to deciphering Sumerian with publications from 1898 to 1938, such as his 1905 publication of Les inscriptions de Sumer et d'Akkad. Charles Fossey at the Collège de France in Paris was another prolific and reliable scholar. His pioneering Contribution au Dictionnaire sumérien–assyrien, Paris 1905–1907, turns out to provide the foundation for P. Anton Deimel's 1934 Sumerisch-Akkadisches Glossar (vol. III of Deimel's 4-volume Sumerisches Lexikon).

In 1908, Stephen Herbert Langdon summarized the rapid expansion in knowledge of Sumerian and Akkadian vocabulary in the pages of Babyloniaca, a journal edited by Charles Virolleaud, in an article "Sumerian-Assyrian Vocabularies", which reviewed a valuable new book on rare logograms by Bruno Meissner. Subsequent scholars have found Langdon's work, including his tablet transcriptions, to be not entirely reliable.

In 1944, the Sumerologist Samuel Noah Kramer provided a detailed and readable summary of the decipherment of Sumerian in his Sumerian Mythology.

Friedrich Delitzsch published a learned Sumerian dictionary and grammar in the form of his Sumerisches Glossar and Grundzüge der sumerischen Grammatik, both appearing in 1914. Delitzsch's student, Arno Poebel, published a grammar with the same title, Grundzüge der sumerischen Grammatik, in 1923, and for 50 years it would be the standard for students studying Sumerian. Another highly influential figure in Sumerology during much of the 20th century was Adam Falkenstein, who produced a grammar of the language of Gudea's inscriptions. Poebel's grammar was finally superseded in 1984 on the publication of The Sumerian Language: An Introduction to its History and Grammatical Structure, by Marie-Louise Thomsen. While there are various points in Sumerian grammar on which Thomsen's views are not shared by most Sumerologists today, Thomsen's grammar (often with express mention of the critiques put forward by Pascal Attinger in his 1993 Eléments de linguistique sumérienne: La construction de du_{11}/e/di 'dire') is the starting point of most recent academic discussions of Sumerian grammar.

More recent monograph-length grammars of Sumerian include Dietz Otto Edzard's 2003 Sumerian Grammar and Bram Jagersma's 2010 A Descriptive Grammar of Sumerian. Piotr Michalowski's essay (entitled, simply, "Sumerian") in the 2004 The Cambridge Encyclopedia of the World's Ancient Languages has also been recognized as a good modern grammatical sketch.

There is relatively little consensus, even among reasonable Sumerologists, in comparison to the state of most modern or classical languages. Verbal morphology, in particular, is hotly disputed. In addition to the general grammars, there are many monographs and articles about particular areas of Sumerian grammar, without which a survey of the field could not be considered complete.

The primary institutional lexical effort in Sumerian is the Pennsylvania Sumerian Dictionary project, begun in 1974. In 2004, the PSD was released on the Web as the ePSD. The project is currently supervised by Steve Tinney. A new edition of the PSD was published online in 2017, and its most recent update was in 2024.

== Phonology ==
Assumed phonological and morphological forms will be between slashes // and curly brackets {}, respectively, with plain text used for the standard Assyriological transcription of Sumerian. Most of the following examples are unattested. Note also that, not unlike most other pre-modern orthographies, Sumerian cuneiform spelling is highly variable, so the transcriptions and the cuneiform examples will generally show only one or at most a few common graphic forms out of many that may occur. Spelling practices have also changed significantly in the course of the history of Sumerian: the examples in the article will use the most phonetically explicit spellings attested, which usually means Old Babylonian or Ur III period spellings, except where an authentic example from another period is used.

Modern knowledge of Sumerian phonology is flawed and incomplete because of the lack of speakers, the transmission through the filter of Akkadian phonology and the difficulties posed by the cuneiform script. As I. M. Diakonoff observes, "when we try to find out the morphophonological structure of the Sumerian language, we must constantly bear in mind that we are not dealing with a language directly but are reconstructing it from a very imperfect mnemonic writing system which had not been basically aimed at the rendering of morphophonemics".

=== Consonants ===
Early Sumerian is conjectured to have had at least the consonants listed in the table below. The consonants in parentheses are reconstructed by some scholars based on indirect evidence; if they existed, they were lost around the Ur III period in the late 3rd millennium BC.

| | | Bilabial | Alveolar | Post- alveolar | Velar | Glottal |
|---|---|---|---|---|---|---|
| Nasal | | *m ⟨m⟩ | *n ⟨n⟩ | | *ŋ ⟨g̃~ng⟩ | |
| Plosive | tenuis | *p ⟨b⟩ | *t ⟨d⟩ | | *k ⟨g⟩ | (*ʔ) |
| Plosive | aspirated | *pʰ ⟨p⟩ | *tʰ ⟨t⟩ | | *kʰ ⟨k⟩ | |
| Affricate | tenuis | | *t͡s ⟨z⟩ | | | |
| Affricate | aspirated | | *t͡sʰ ⟨ř~dr⟩ | | | |
| Fricative | | | *s ⟨s⟩ | *ʃ ⟨š~sh⟩ | *x ⟨ḫ~h⟩ | (*h) |
| Approximant | | | *l ⟨l⟩ | (*j) | | |
| Tap | | | *ɾ ⟨r⟩ | | | |

- a simple distribution of six stop consonants in three places of articulation, originally distinguished by aspiration. In the late 3rd millennium BC, the unaspirated stops are thought to have become voiced in most positions (although not word-finally), whereas the voiceless aspirated stops maintained their aspiration. (Note: Since Akkadian, too, had developed aspiration in the realization of its voiceless (non-emphatic) consonants by that time, that aspiration was also preserved after the extinction of Sumerian, in Akkadian native speakers' pronunciation of the language, and is hence reflected even in Ancient Greek transcriptions of Sumerian words with the letters φ, θ and χ.)
  - p (voiceless aspirated bilabial plosive),
  - t (voiceless aspirated alveolar plosive),
  - k (voiceless aspirated velar plosive),
    - As a rule, the voiceless aspirated consonants (p, t and k) did not occur word-finally.
  - b (voiceless unaspirated bilabial plosive), later voiced;
  - d (voiceless unaspirated alveolar plosive), later voiced;
  - g (voiceless unaspirated velar plosive), later voiced.
- a phoneme usually represented by ř (sometimes written dr), which became /d/ or /r/ in northern and southern dialects, respectively, after the Old Akkadian period. It was first reconstructed as a voiced alveolar tap /ɾ/, but Bram Jagersma argues that it was a voiceless aspirated alveolar affricate because of its reflection in loanwords in Akkadian, among other reasons, and this view is accepted by Gábor Zólyomi (2017: 28). Other suggestions that have been made is that ř was a voiceless alveolar tap.
- a simple distribution of three nasal consonants in similar distribution to the stops:
  - m (bilabial nasal),
  - n (alveolar nasal),
  - g̃ (frequently printed ng or ĝ due to typesetting constraints, increasingly transcribed as ŋ) /ŋ/ (likely a velar nasal, as in sing, it has also been argued to be a labiovelar nasal [ŋʷ] or a nasalized labiovelar).
- a set of three sibilants:
  - s, likely a voiceless alveolar fricative,
  - z, likely a voiceless unaspirated alveolar affricate, /t͡s/, as shown by Akkadian loans from /s/=[t͡s] to Sumerian z. In early Sumerian, this would have been the unaspirated counterpart to ř. Like the stop series b, d and g, it is thought to have become voiced /dz/ in some positions in the late 3rd millennium.
  - š (sometimes written sh), generally described as a voiceless postalveolar fricative, /ʃ/, as in ship) (Note: Another, relatively uncommon opinion based on loanwords to and from Old Akkadian is that it was actually a voiceless dental fricative /θ/ as in think or a sound similar to it.)
- ḫ (a velar fricative, /x/, sometimes written ⟨h⟩)
- two liquid consonants:
  - l (a lateral consonant)
  - r (a rhotic consonant), which Jagersma argues was realized as a tap [ɾ] because of various evidence suggesting its phonetic similarity to /t/ and /d/.

The existence of various other consonants has been hypothesized based on graphic alternations and loans, though none have found wide acceptance. For example, Diakonoff lists evidence for two lateral phonemes, two rhotics, two back fricatives, and two g-sounds (excluding the velar nasal), and assumes a phonemic difference between consonants that are dropped word-finally (such as the g in 𒍠 zag > za_{3}) and consonants that remain (such as the g in 𒆷𒀝 lag). Other "hidden" consonant phonemes that have been suggested include semivowels such as /j/ and /w/, and a glottal fricative /h/ or a glottal stop that could explain the absence of vowel contraction in some words—though objections have been raised against that as well. A recent descriptive grammar by Bram Jagersma includes /j/, /h/, and /ʔ/ as unwritten consonants, with the glottal stop even serving as the first-person pronominal prefix. However, these unwritten consonants had been lost by the Ur III period according to Jagersma.

Very often, a word-final consonant was not expressed in writing—and was possibly omitted in pronunciation—so it surfaced only when followed by a vowel: for example the /k/ of the genitive case ending -ak does not appear in 𒂍𒈗𒆷 e_{2} lugal-la "the king's house", but it becomes obvious in 𒂍𒈗𒆷𒄰 e_{2} lugal-la-kam "(it) is the king's house" (compare liaison in French). Jagersma believes that the lack of expression of word-final consonants was originally mostly a graphic convention, but that in the late 3rd millennium voiceless aspirated stops and affricates (/pʰ/, /tʰ/, /kʰ/ and /tsʰ/) were, indeed, gradually lost in syllable-final position, as were the unaspirated stops /d/ and /ɡ/.

=== Vowels ===
| | Front | Central | Back |
|---|---|---|---|
| Close | *i | | *u |
| Mid | *e | | (*o) |
| Open | | *a | |

The vowels that are clearly distinguished by the cuneiform script are /a e i u/. Various researchers have posited the existence of more vowel phonemes such as /o/ and even the open-mid /ɛ/ and /ɔ/, which would have been concealed by the transmission through Akkadian, as that language does not distinguish them. That would explain the seeming existence of numerous homophones in transliterated Sumerian, as well as some details of the phenomena mentioned in the next paragraph. These hypotheses are not yet generally accepted. Phonemic vowel length has also been posited by many scholars based on vowel length in Sumerian loanwords in Akkadian, occasional so-called plene spellings with extra vowel signs, and some internal evidence from alternations. (Note: Above all, two different signs for the syllable /ne/, which are systematically used in different morphemes, sometimes alternate so that a contraction with a following vowel /e/ causes the replacement of 𒉌 ne_{2} by 𒉈 ne: ne_{2} */ne/ + */e/ > ne */neː/. The suspected long /eː/ also seems to be resistant to apocope and assimilation which are undergone by the suspected short /e/.) However, scholars who believe in the existence of phonemic vowel length do not consider it possible to reconstruct the length of the vowels in most Sumerian words. (Note: Some frequent words considered to contain long vowels based on borrowings into or from Akkadian are 𒆹 ambār "marsh", 𒀭 ān "sky", 𒄑𒍎 ^{g̃eš}banšūr, 𒁓 būr "vessel", 𒁮𒃼 dam-gār_{3} "merchant", 𒂍 ē_{2} (from earlier /haj/) "house", 𒂊 ēg_{2} "levee", 𒂗 ēn "highpriest", 𒄀 gīn_{6} "firm, true", 𒋼𒀀 kār "harbour", 𒆤 kīd "reed mat", 𒈜 nār "musician", 𒉣 nūn "prince", 𒊕 sāg̃ "head", 𒉪𒁕 šēr_{7}-da "crime" and 𒍣 zīd "right". Among grammatical morphemes, length has been posited with greater or lesser confidence for the nominal plural marker 𒂊𒉈 -enē, the 3rd person singular animate pronoun 𒀀𒉈 a-nē or 𒂊𒉈 e-nē, the 1st, 2nd and 3rd person plural possessive enclitics 𒈨 -mē, 𒍪𒉈𒉈 -zu-nē-nē and 𒀀𒉈𒉈 -a-nē-nē, the 1st, 2nd and 3rd person plural verbal prefixes 𒈨 -mē-, 𒂊𒉈 -e-nē- and 𒉈 -nnē-, the ablative 𒋫 -tā, the prospective prefix 𒅇 ū_{3}- (but shortened and qualitatively assimilated in an open syllable), the affirmative prefix 𒈾 nā- and the 1st and 2nd person pronouns 𒂷 g̃ē_{26} and 𒍢 zē_{2} in position before the enclitic copula 𒈨 -me-.)

During the Old Sumerian period, the southern dialects (those used in the cities of Lagash, Umma, Ur and Uruk), which also provide the overwhelming majority of material from that stage, exhibited a vowel harmony rule based on vowel height or advanced tongue root. Essentially, prefixes containing /e/ or /i/ appear to alternate between /e/ in front of syllables containing open vowels and /i/ in front of syllables containing close vowels; e.g. 𒂊𒁽 e-kaš_{4} "he runs", but 𒉌𒁺 i_{3}-gub "he stands". Certain verbs with stem vowels spelt with /u/ and /e/, however, seem to take prefixes with a vowel quality opposite to the one that would have been expected according to this rule, (Note: In particular, the verbs 𒊒 ru "lay down", 𒋩 sur "produce fluid", 𒃡 ur_{3} "drag", and 𒌴 ur_{4} "pluck" take open-vowel prefixes; and the verbs 𒌣 de_{2} "pour", 𒂊 e "do, say", 𒇯𒁺 ed_{3} "go out", 𒆟 keš_{2}(d) "bind", and 𒅊 se_{12} "live/dwell (plural)" take close-vowel prefixes.) which has been variously interpreted as an indication either of the existence of additional vowel phonemes in Sumerian or simply of incorrectly reconstructed readings of individual lexemes. The 3rd person plural dimensional prefix 𒉈 -ne- is also unaffected, which Jagersma posits to be caused by the length of its vowel. In addition, some have argued for a second vowel harmony rule.

There also appear to be many cases of partial or complete assimilation of the vowel of certain prefixes and suffixes to one in the adjacent syllable reflected in writing in some of the later periods, and there is a noticeable, albeit not absolute, tendency for disyllabic stems to have the same vowel in both syllables. These patterns, too, are interpreted as evidence for a richer vowel inventory by some researchers. For example, we find forms like 𒂵𒁽 ga-kaš_{4} "let me run", but, from the Neo-Sumerian period onwards, occasional spellings like 𒄘𒈬𒊏𒀊𒋧 gu_{2}-mu-ra-ab-šum_{2} "let me give it to you". According to Jagersma, these assimilations are limited to open syllables and, as with vowel harmony, Jagersma interprets their absence as the result of vowel length or of stress in at least some cases. There is evidence of various cases of elision of vowels, apparently in unstressed syllables; in particular an initial vowel in a word of more than two syllables seems to have been elided in many cases. What appears to be vowel contraction in hiatus (*/aa/, */ia/, */ua/ > a, */ae/ > a, */ie/ > i or e, */ue/ > u or e, etc.) is also very common. There is some uncertainty and variance of opinion as to whether the result in each specific case is a long vowel or whether a vowel is simply replaced/deleted.

Syllables could have any of the following structures: V, CV, VC, CVC. More complex syllables, if Sumerian had them, are not expressed as such by the cuneiform script.

=== Stress ===
Sumerian stress is usually presumed to have been dynamic, since it seems to have caused vowel elisions on many occasions. Opinions vary on its placement. As argued by Bram Jagersma and confirmed by other scholars, the adaptation of Akkadian words of Sumerian origin seems to suggest that Sumerian stress tended to be on the last syllable of the word, at least in its citation form. The treatment of forms with grammatical morphemes is less clear. Many cases of apheresis in forms with enclitics have been interpreted as entailing that the same rule was true of the phonological word on many occasions, i.e. that the stress could be shifted onto the enclitics; however, the fact that many of these same enclitics have allomorphs with apocopated final vowels (e.g. /‑še/ ~ /-š/) suggests that they were, on the contrary, unstressed when these allomorphs arose. It has also been conjectured that the frequent assimilation of the vowels of non-final syllables to the vowel of the final syllable of the word may be due to stress on it. However, a number of suffixes and enclitics consisting of /e/ or beginning in /e/ are also assimilated and reduced.

In earlier scholarship, somewhat different views were expressed and attempts were made to formulate detailed rules for the effect of grammatical morphemes and compounding on stress, but with inconclusive results. Based predominantly on patterns of vowel elision, Adam Falkenstein argued that stress in monomorphemic words tended to be on the first syllable, and that the same applied without exception to reduplicated stems, but that the stress shifted onto the last syllable in a first member of a compound or idiomatic phrase, onto the syllable preceding a (final) suffix/enclitic, and onto the first syllable of the possessive enclitic /-ani/. In his view, single verbal prefixes were unstressed, but longer sequences of verbal prefixes attracted the stress to their first syllable. Jagersma has objected that many of Falkenstein's examples of elision are medial and so, while the stress was obviously not on the medial syllable in question, the examples do not show where it was.

Joachim Krecher attempted to find more clues in texts written phonetically by assuming that geminations, plene spellings and unexpected "stronger" consonant qualities were clues to stress placement. Using this method, he confirmed Falkenstein's views that reduplicated forms were stressed on the first syllable and that there was generally stress on the syllable preceding a (final) suffix/enclitic, on the penultimate syllable of a polysyllabic enclitic such as -/ani/, -/zunene/ etc., on the last syllable of the first member of a compound, and on the first syllable in a sequence of verbal prefixes. However, he found that single verbal prefixes received the stress just as prefix sequences did, and that in most of the above cases, another stress often seemed to be present as well: on the stem to which the suffixes/enclitics were added, on the second compound member in compounds, and possibly on the verbal stem that prefixes were added to or on following syllables. He also did not agree that the stress of monomorphemic words was typically initial and believed to have found evidence of words with initial as well as with final stress; in fact, he did not even exclude the possibility that stress was normally stem-final.

Pascal Attinger has partly concurred with Krecher, but doubts that the stress was always on the syllable preceding a suffix/enclitic and argues that in a prefix sequence, the stressed syllable was not the first one, but rather the last one if heavy and the next-to-the-last one in other cases. Attinger has also remarked that the patterns observed may be the result of Akkadian influence – either due to linguistic convergence while Sumerian was still a living language or, since the data comes from the Old Babylonian period, a feature of Sumerian as pronounced by native speakers of Akkadian. The latter has also been pointed out by Jagersma, who is, in addition, sceptical about the very assumptions underlying the method used by Krecher to establish the place of stress.

=== Orthography ===
Sumerian writing expressed pronunciation only roughly. It was often morphophonemic, so much of the allomorphic variation could be ignored. Especially in earlier Sumerian, coda consonants were also often ignored in spelling; e.g. /mung̃areš/ 'they put it here' could be written 𒈬𒃻𒌷 mu-g̃ar-re_{2}. The use of VC signs for that purpose, producing more elaborate spellings such as 𒈬𒌦𒃻𒌷𒌍 mu-un-g̃ar-re_{2}-eš_{3}, became more common only in the Neo-Sumerian and especially in the Old Babylonian period.

Conversely, an intervocalic consonant, especially at the end of a morpheme followed by a vowel-initial morpheme, was usually "repeated" by the use of a CV sign for the same consonant; e.g. 𒊬 sar "write" – 𒊬𒊏 sar-ra "written". (Note: This is most consistent with stops. With other consonants, there is some vacillation depending on the consonant, the following vowel, the relevant morpheme, the time period and the region; overall, sonorants favour doubling more than fricatives (especially sibilants) and affricates do, /a/ favours it more than /e/, and doubling is more extensive in Old Sumerian than in subsequent periods.) This results in orthographic gemination that is usually reflected in Sumerological transliteration, but does not actually designate any phonological phenomenon such as length. (Note: Nonetheless, some Sumerologists also posit genuine geminate consonants in Sumerian, as exemplified later in the article, but orthographic doubling as seen above is usually not sufficient to predict its presence.) It is also relevant in this context that, as explained above, many morpheme-final consonants seem to have been elided unless followed by a vowel at various stages in the history of Sumerian. These are traditionally termed Auslauts in Sumerology and may or may not be expressed in transliteration: e.g. the logogram 𒊮 for /šag/ > /ša(g)/ "heart" may be transliterated as šag_{4} or as ša_{3}. Thus, when the following consonant appears in front of a vowel, it can be said to be expressed only by the next sign: for example, 𒊮𒂵 šag_{4}-ga "in the heart" can also be interpreted as ša_{3}-ga.

Of course, when a CVC sound sequence is expressed by a sequence of signs with the sound values CV-VC, that does not necessarily indicate a long vowel or a sequence of identical vowels either. To mark such a thing, so-called "plene" writings with an additional vowel sign repeating the preceding vowel were used, although that never came to be done systematically. A typical plene writing involved a sequence such as (C)V-V(-VC/CV), e.g. 𒂼𒀀 ama-a for /amaa/ < {ama-e} "the mother (ergative case)").

Sumerian texts vary in the degree to which they use logograms or opt for syllabic (phonetic) spellings instead: e.g. the word 𒃻 g̃ar "put" may also be written phonetically as 𒂷𒅈 g̃a_{2}-ar. They also vary in the degree to which allomorphic variation was expressed, e.g. 𒁀𒄄𒌍 ba-gi_{4}-eš or 𒁀𒄄𒅖 ba-gi_{4}-iš for "they returned". While early Sumerian writing was highly logographic, there was a tendency towards more phonetic spelling in the Neo-Sumerian period. Consistent syllabic spelling was employed when writing down the Emesal dialect (since the usual logograms would have been read in Emegir by default), for the purpose of teaching the language and often in recording incantations.

As already mentioned, texts written in the Archaic Sumerian period are difficult to interpret, because they often omit grammatical elements and determinatives. In addition, many literary-mythological texts from that period use a special orthographic style called UD.GAL.NUN, which seems to be based on substitution of certain signs or groups of signs for others. For example, the three signs 𒌓 UD, 𒃲 GAL and 𒉣 NUN, which the system is named for, are substituted for 𒀭 AN, 𒂗 EN, and 𒆤 LIL_{2} respectively, producing the name of the god ^{d}en-lil_{2}. The motivation for this practice is mysterious; it has been suggested that it was a kind of cryptography. Texts written in UD.GAL.NUN are still understood very poorly and only partially. However, recent research by Annette Zgoll about the Sumerian term me shows that this hermetic style is typical of Mesopotamian ritual texts.

== Grammar ==
Ever since its decipherment, research of Sumerian has been made difficult by the relative sparseness of linguistic data, the apparent lack of a closely related language, and the features of the writing system. A further oft-mentioned and paradoxical problem for the study of Sumerian is that the most numerous and varied texts written in the most phonetically explicit and precise orthography are only dated to periods when the scribes themselves were no longer native speakers and often demonstrably had less-than-perfect command of the language they were writing in; conversely, for much of the time during which Sumerian was still a living language, the surviving sources are few, unvaried and/or written in an orthography that is more difficult to interpret.

Typologically, Sumerian is classified as an agglutinative, ergative (consistently so in its nominal morphology and split ergative in its verbal morphology), and subject–object–verb language.

=== Nominal morphology ===
==== Noun phrases ====
The Sumerian noun is typically a one or two-syllable root (𒅆 igi "eye", 𒂍 e_{2} "house, household", 𒎏 nin "lady"), although there are also some roots with three syllables like 𒆠𒇴 šakanka "market". There are two semantically predictable grammatical genders, which have traditionally been called animate and inanimate, although these names do not express their membership exactly, as explained below.

The adjectives and other modifiers follow the noun (𒈗𒈤 lugal maḫ "great king"). The noun itself is not inflected; rather, grammatical markers attach to the noun phrase as a whole, in a certain order. Typically, that order would be:

| noun | adjective | numeral | genitive phrase | relative clause | possessive marker | plural marker | case marker |

An example may be:

dig̃ir gal-gal-g̃u-ene-ra
god great-REDUP-1.POSS-PL.AN-DAT
"for my great gods"

The possessive, plural and case markers are traditionally referred to as "suffixes", but have recently also been described as enclitics or postpositions.

===== Gender =====
The two genders have been variously called animate and inanimate, human and non-human, or personal/person and impersonal/non-person. Their assignment is semantically predictable: the first gender includes humans and gods, while the second one includes animals, plants, non-living objects, abstract concepts, and groups of humans. Since the second gender includes animals, the use of the terms animate and inanimate is somewhat misleading and conventional, but it is most common in the literature, so it will be maintained in this article.

There are some minor deviations from the gender assignment rules, for example:

- The word for 𒀩 alan "statue" may be treated as animate.
- Words for slaves such as 𒊩𒆳 geme_{2} "slave woman" and 𒊕 sag̃ "head", used in its secondary sense of "slave", may be treated as inanimate.
- In fable-like contexts, which occur frequently in Sumerian proverbs, animals are usually treated as animate.

===== Number =====
The plural marker proper is (𒂊)𒉈 /-(e)ne/. (Note: The initial vowel /e/ appears only after a consonant and is absent after a vowel. Jagersma believes that it contracts with a preceding vowel, while lengthening it. In Old Babylonian Sumerian, spellings suggesting such assimilation are found: 𒇽𒅇𒉈 lu_{2}-u_{3}-ne "men".) It is used only with nouns of the animate gender and its use is optional. It is often omitted when other parts of the clause indicate the plurality of the referent. Thus, it is not used if the noun is modified by a numeral (𒇽𒁹𒁹𒁹 lu_{2} eš_{5} "three men"). It has also been observed that until the Ur III period, the marker generally is not used in a noun phrase in the absolutive case, unless this is necessary for disambiguation. Instead, the plurality of the absolutive participant is commonly expressed only by the form of the verb in the clause: e.g. 𒇽𒁀𒀄𒀄𒌍 lu_{2} ba-zaḫ_{3}-zaḫ_{3}-eš "the men ran away", 𒇽𒈬𒅇𒆪𒁉𒌍 lu_{2} mu-u_{3}-dab_{5}-be_{2}-eš "I caught the men". The plural marker is not used when referring to a group of people, because a group of people is treated as inanimate; e.g. 𒀳 engar "farmer" with no plural marker may refer to "(the group of) farmers".

As the following example shows, the marker is appended to the end of the phrase, even after a relative clause:

lu e-a ba-dab-a-(e)ne
man house-in MID-catch-NMLZ-PL.AN
"the men who were caught in the house"

Likewise, the plural marker is usually (albeit not always) added only once when a whole series of coordinated nouns have plural reference:

engar sipad šukuř-ene
farmer shepherd fisherman-PL.AN
"farmers, shepherds and fishermen"

Another way in which a kind of plurality is expressed is by means of reduplication of the noun: 𒀭𒀭 dig̃ir-dig̃ir "gods", 𒌈𒌈 ib_{2}-ib_{2} "hips". However, this construction is usually considered to have a more specialized meaning, variously interpreted as totality ("all the gods", "both of my hips") or distribution/separateness ("each of the gods taken separately"). An especially frequently occurring reduplicated word, 𒆳𒆳 kur-kur "foreign lands", may have simply plural meaning, and in very late usage, the meaning of the reduplication in general might be simple plurality.

At least a few adjectives (notably 𒃲 gal "great" and 𒌉 tur "small") are also reduplicated when the noun they modify has plural reference: 𒀀𒃲𒃲 a gal-gal "the great waters". In that case, the noun itself is not reduplicated. This is sometimes interpreted as an expression of simple plurality, while a minority view is that the meaning of these forms is not purely plural, but rather the same as that of noun reduplication.

Two other ways of expressing plurality are characteristic only of very late Sumerian usage and have made their way into Sumerograms used in writing Akkadian and other languages. One is used with inanimate nouns and consists of the modification of the noun with the adjective 𒄭𒀀 ḫi-a "various" (lit. 'mixed'), e.g. 𒇻𒄭𒀀 udu ḫi-a "sheep". The other is adding the 3rd person plural form of the enclitic copula 𒈨𒌍 -me-eš to a noun (𒈗𒈨𒌍 lugal-me-eš "kings", originally "they (who) are kings").

===== Case =====
====== Case markers ======
The generally recognized case markers are:

| case | ending | most common spelling | approximate English equivalents and function |
|---|---|---|---|
| absolutive | /-Ø/ | | intransitive subject or transitive object |
| ergative | /-e/ (Note: As is generally the case with the vowel -/e/, the vowel of the ergative ending can contract with a preceding vowel, lengthening it: lu_{2}-e > 𒇽𒅇 lu_{2}-u_{3} "man (erg.)". In early texts, the length of the vowel isn't marked at all, leaving the ending with no reflection in the spelling.) (primarily with animates) (Note: According to Jagersma, this is a tendency due to semantic reasons, but not a strict rule of the language.) | (𒂊 -e) | transitive subject |
| directive (Note: Also known traditionally as the "locative-terminative". It has been pointed out that the term "directive" is misleading, since this Sumerian case simply expresses contiguity, which may or may not be the result of movement in a certain direction. Based on its meaning, it could be called adessive, but it can also express the destination of a movement, making the meaning allative. Similarly, the Sumerian locative expresses internal location both as a stative condition (inessive meaning) or as the result of a movement (illative meaning).) | /-e/ (only with inanimates) (Note: With animates, the dative is usually used instead.) | (𒂊 -e) | "in(to) contact with", "at", "upon", "for", "as for"; causee |
| genitive | /-a(k)/, /-(k)/ (Note: The final consonant /k/ appears only in front of a following vowel (in the spelling, and at least by Ur III times in pronunciation as well); see the section on Consonants above for this phenomenon. Thus, we find 𒈗𒆷 lugal-la for {lugal-ak} "of the king", but 𒈗𒆷𒄰 lugal-la-kam for {lugal-ak-am} "(it) is of the king". Moreover, if /k/ is preserved, the preceding vowel often seems to be omitted at least in writing, especially after /l/, /m/, /n/, /r/, /s/, /š/ and /ḫ/: 𒈗𒄰 lugal-kam. Conversely, the initial vowel /a/ of the genitive marker appears to be dropped or assimilated after a preceding stem-final vowel in content words: e.g. {dumu-ak} is written simply 𒌉 dumu, presumably standing for */dumu(k)/. The same appears to happen after the plural marker 𒂊𒉈 -e-ne and the plural possessive pronominal enclitics 𒈨 -me "our", 𒍪𒉈𒉈 -zu-ne-ne "your (pl.)" and (𒀀/𒂊)𒉈𒉈 -a/e-ne-ne "their", so that the sequences of these morphemes and the genitive end in -/e(k)/. However, there is some disagreement on the treatment of content words and the nature of the whole process; see the following footnote on this matter. Finally, the genitive marker occasionally seems to be simply omitted in writing, especially after a fricative.) (Note: In front of the vowel /a/ of the genitive marker -/ak/ and the locative marker /a/, the possessive pronominal enclitics 𒈬 -g̃u_{10} "my", 𒍪 -zu "your (sing.)", 𒉌 -ni "his/her" and 𒁉-bi "its" are contracted and/or assimilated, so that they appear as 𒂷 -g̃a_{2}, 𒍝 -za, 𒈾 -na and 𒁀 -ba, respectively. In contrast, these case markers do not cause the loss of the final /e/ in the plural marker 𒂊𒉈 -e-ne and in the plural possessive pronominal enclitics 𒈨 -me "our", 𒍪𒉈𒉈 -zu-ne-ne "your (pl.)" and (𒀀/𒂊)𒉈𒉈 -a/e-ne-ne "their". In the case of the genitive, the -/a/ of the case marker is elided instead, so that the genitive sequence ends in -/e(k)/. There is some evidence that the stem-final vowel was also dropped in some content words under unclear circumstances, but that this was obscured by the spelling. With respect to the genitive, Jagersma tentatively suggests and Zólyomi (2017: 42–43) concurs that the variation in both content words and enclitics was determined by vowel length: a preceding short vowel generally assimilated to the /a/ and the product was a long /aː/, whereas a preceding long vowel (as in the plural marker, which they believe to have been pronounced -/eneː/) caused dropping of the following /a/.) | (𒀀 -a) | "of" |
| equative | /-gin/ | 𒁶 -gen_{7} | "as", "like" |
| dative | /-r(a)/ (Note: The allomorph -/r/ is used after vowels. In early texts, it may not be expressed at all. Alternatively, the alternation may be ignored in the spelling, so that -ra is written even after vowels. Additionally, in the Ur III period, -a may occur instead of -ra after possessive pronominal enclitics or the genitive marker.) (only with animates) (Note: With inanimates, the directive is usually used instead.) | 𒊏 -ra | "to", "for", "upon", causee |
| terminative (Note: The meaning is not necessarily "up to" or "until" as with a terminative case, but rather expresses a general direction, so this case could have been called directive.) | /-(e)š(e)/ (Note: The allomorph -/š/ is used after vowels. In early texts, it may not be expressed graphically at all. Alternatively, the alternation may be ignored in the spelling, so that -še_{3} is written even after vowels.) | 𒂠 -še_{3} | "to", "towards", "for", "until", "in exchange (for)", "instead if", "as for", "because of" |
| comitative | /-d(a)/ (Note: Although the marker is never written with a sign for VC, it seems likely that there was an allomorph -/d/ used after vowels, leading to the dative marker remaining unwritten in this position in early texts.) | 𒁕 -da | "(together) with", "because of (an emotion)" |
| locative (Note: Unlike the Indo-European locative cases, the Sumerian locative can express not only a static location, but also the direction of a movement; the key feature is that the spatial meaning is inessive ("in") or superessive ("on").) | /-a/ (Note: Jagersma believes that, like the nominalizing enclitic, this marker originally began in a glottal stop (/ʔa/). The glottal stop, in his view, later assimilated to the preceding consonant and caused it to be geminated.) (only with inanimates) (Note: With animates, the corresponding case in some constructions is the dative.) | (𒀀 -a) | "in/into", "on/onto", "about", "by means of", "with (a certain material)" |
| ablative (only with inanimates) (Note: With animates, the construction 𒆠...(𒀀)𒋫 /ki X-a(k)-ta/, lit. "from the place of X" is used.) | /-ta/ | 𒋫 -ta | "from", "since", "by (means of)", "in addition to"/"with", distributive ("each") |

The final vowels of most of the above markers are subject to loss if they are attached to vowel-final words.

In addition, there are the enclitic particles 𒈾𒀭𒈾 na-an-na meaning "without" and (𒀀)𒅗𒉆 (-a)-ka-nam -/akanam/ (in earlier Sumerian) or (𒀀)𒆤𒌍 (-a)-ke_{4}-eš_{2} -/akeš/ "because of" (in later Sumerian).

Note that these nominal cases enter interact with the so-called dimensional prefixes of the verb that the noun modifies, producing additional meanings. While the dative and directive are in complementary distribution in the noun, they can nevertheless be distinguished when the verbal prefixes are taken into account. Likewise, whereas the meanings "in(to)" and "on(to)" are expressed by the same nominal case, they can be disambiguated by the verbal prefixes. This is explained in more detail in the section on Dimensional prefixes.

Additional spatial or temporal meanings can be expressed by genitive phrases like "at the head of" = "above", "at the face of" = "in front of", "at the outer side of" = "because of", etc.:

bar udu ḫad-ak-a
outer.side sheep white-GEN-LOC
"because of a white sheep"

The embedded structure of the noun phrase can be further illustrated with the following phrase:

sipad udu siki-(a)k-ak-ene
shepherd sheep wool-GEN-GEN-PL.AN
"shepherds of woolly sheep"

Here, the first genitive morpheme (-a(k)) subordinates 𒋠 siki "wool" to 𒇻 udu "sheep", and the second subordinates 𒇻𒋠 udu siki-(a)k "sheep of wool" (or "woolly sheep") to 𒉺𒇻 sipad "shepherd".

====== Case usage ======
The uses of the ergative and absolutive case are those typical of ergative languages. The subject of an intransitive verb such as "come" is in the same case as the object of a transitive verb such as "build": the absolutive case. In contrast, the subject of a transitive verb has a different case, the ergative. This can be illustrated with the following examples:

lugal-∅ i-m-g̃en
king-ABS FIN-VEN-come
"The king came."

lugal-e e-∅ i-n-du
king-ERG house-ABS FIN-3.AN.A-build
"The king built a house."

In contrast with the verbal morphology, Sumerian nominal morphology consistently follows this ergative principle regardless of tense/aspect, person and mood.

Besides the general meanings of the case forms outlined above, there are many lexically determined and more or less unpredictable uses of specific cases, often governed by a certain verb in a certain sense:

- The comitative is used to express:
  - "to run away" (e.g. 𒀄 zaḫ_{3}) or to "take away" (e.g. 𒋼𒀀 kar) from somebody;
  - 𒍪 zu "to know/learn something from somebody";
  - 𒁲 sa_{2} "to be equal to somebody" (but the same verb uses the directive in the phrasal verb si ...sa_{2} "be/put something in order", see Phrasal verbs);
  - the meaning "ago" in the construction 𒈬𒁕...𒋫 mu-da X-ta "X years ago" (lit. 'since X with the years')
- The directive is used to express:
  - the objects of 𒍏 dab_{6} "surround", 𒊏 raḫ_{2} "hit", 𒋛 si "fill", (Note: The substance someone fills something with is in the absolutive.) 𒋳 tag "touch"
  - 𒈭 daḫ "add something to something"
  - 𒄄 gi_{4} in the sense "bring back something to something"
  - 𒍑 us_{2} "be next to something, follow something"
  - 𒅗 dug_{4} "say something about/concerning something" ({b-i-dug} "say something about this" often seems to have very vague reference, approaching the meaning "say something then")
- The locative with a directive verbal prefix, expressing "on(to)", is used to express:
  - 𒆕 řu_{2} "hold on to something"
  - 𒄷𒈿 sa_{4} "give (as a name)" to somebody/something
  - 𒁺 tum_{2} "be fit for something"
- 𒉚 sa_{10} "to barter" governs, in the sense "to buy", the terminative to introduce the seller from whom something is bought, but in another construction it uses the locative for the thing something is bartered for;
- 𒋾 ti "to approach" governs the dative.

For the government of phrasal verbs, see the relevant section.

==== Pronouns ====
The attested personal pronouns are:

| | independent | possessive suffix/enclitic |
|---|---|---|
| 1st person singular | 𒂷(𒂊) g̃e_{26}(-e) | 𒈬 -g̃u_{10} |
| 2nd person singular | 𒍢 ze_{2}, Old Babylonian 𒍝𒂊 za-e | 𒍪 -zu |
| 3rd person singular animate | 𒀀𒉈 a-ne or 𒂊𒉈 e-ne (Note: The variant with /e/ is found in Old Babylonian and has a few attestations in Ur III Neo-Sumerian.) | (𒀀)𒉌 -(a)-ni (Note: The initial /a/ is present after consonants (albeit not always written, especially in earlier periods), but contracts with a preceding vowel.) |
| 3rd person inanimate (Note: The inanimate has no number distinction, so 𒁉 -bi can mean both "its" and "their".) | | 𒁉 -bi |
| 1st person plural | (𒈨𒂗𒉈𒂗 me-en-de_{3}-en?, 𒈨 me?) (Note: The forms /menden/ or /me/ for "we" and /menzen/ for "you (pl.)" are only attested in Sumero-Akkadian lexical lists and, in the case of /mende(n)/, in an Old Babylonian literary text. Two of them seem to consist of the enclitic copula conjugated in the corresponding person and number ("(who) we are", "(who) you (pl.) are"). Another form given in lexical lists is 𒍝𒂊𒈨𒂗𒍢𒂗 za-e-me-en-ze_{2}-en, clearly a combination of the personal plural you (sing.) and the 2nd person plural form of the copula. For these reasons, their authenticity is considered dubious.) | 𒈨 -me |
| 2nd person plural | (𒈨𒂗𒍢𒂗 me-en-ze_{2}-en?) (Note: The forms /menden/ or /me/ for "we" and /menzen/ for "you (pl.)" are only attested in Sumero-Akkadian lexical lists and, in the case of /mende(n)/, in an Old Babylonian literary text. Two of them seem to consist of the enclitic copula conjugated in the corresponding person and number ("(who) we are", "(who) you (pl.) are"). Another form given in lexical lists is 𒍝𒂊𒈨𒂗𒍢𒂗 za-e-me-ze_{2}-en, clearly a combination of the personal plural "you" (sing.) and the 2nd person plural form of the copula. For these reasons, their authenticity is considered dubious.) | 𒍪𒉈𒉈 -zu-ne-ne |
| 3rd person plural animate | 𒀀/𒂊𒉈𒉈 a/e-ne-ne (Note: The variant with /e/ is found in Old Babylonian and has a few attestations in Ur III Neo-Sumerian.) | 𒀀/𒂊𒉈𒉈 (-a)-ne-ne, (Note: The initial /a/ is present after consonants (albeit not always written, especially in earlier periods), but contracts with a preceding vowel.) 𒁉 -bi |

The stem vowels of 𒂷(𒂊) g̃e_{26}(-e) and 𒂊 ze_{2} are assimilated to a following case suffix containing /a/ and then have the forms 𒂷 g̃a- and 𒍝 za-; e.g. 𒍝𒊏 za-ra 'to you (sg.)'.

As far as demonstrative pronouns are concerned, Sumerian most commonly uses the enclitic 𒁉 -bi to express the meaning "this". There are rare instances of other demonstrative enclitics such as 𒂊 -e "this", 𒊺 -še "that" and 𒊑 -re "that". The difference between the three has been explained in terms of increasing distance from the speaker or as a difference between proximity to the speaker, proximity to the listener and distance from both, akin to the Japanese or Latin three-term demonstrative system. The independent demonstrative pronouns are 𒉈𒂗/𒉈𒂊 ne-e(n) "this (thing)" and 𒄯 ur_{5} "that (thing)"; -ne(n) might also be used as another enclitic. (Note: It has been ascribed a more contrastive nuance "this (as opposed to others)".) "Now" is 𒉌𒉈𒂠 i_{3}-ne-eš_{2} or 𒀀𒁕𒀠 a-da-al. For "then" and "there", the declined noun phrases 𒌓𒁀 ud-ba "at that time" and 𒆠𒁀 ki-ba "at that place" are used; "so" is 𒄯𒁶 ur_{5}-gen_{7}, lit. "like that".

The interrogative pronouns are 𒀀𒁀 a-ba "who" and 𒀀𒈾 a-na "what" (also used as "whoever" and "whatever" when introducing dependent clauses). The stem for "where" is 𒈨 me- (used in the locative, terminative and ablative to express "where", "whither" and "whence", respectively) . "When" is 𒇷/𒂗 en_{3}/en, but also the stem 𒈨(𒂊)𒈾 me-(e)-na is attested for "when" (in the emphatic form me-na-am_{3} and in the terminative me-na-še_{3} "until when?", "how long?"). "How" and "why" are expressed by 𒀀𒈾𒀸 a-na-aš (lit. 'what for?') and 𒀀𒁶 a-gen_{7} "how" (an equative case form, perhaps "like what?"). The expected form 𒀀𒈾𒁶 a-na-gen_{7} is used in Old Babylonian.

An indefinite pronoun is 𒈾𒈨 na-me "any", which is only attested in attributive function until the Old Babylonian period, but may also stand alone in the sense "anyone, anything" in late texts. It can be added to nouns to produce further expressions with pronominal meaning such as 𒇽𒈾𒈨 lu_{2} na-me "anyone", 𒃻𒈾𒈨 nig̃_{2} na-me "anything", 𒆠𒈾𒈨 ki na-me "anywhere", 𒌓𒈾𒈨 ud_{4} na-me "ever, any time". The nouns 𒇽 lu_{2} "man" and 𒃻 nig̃_{2} "thing" are also used for "someone, anyone" and "something, anything". With negation, all of these expressions naturally acquire the meanings "nobody", "nothing", "nowhere" and "never".

The reflexive pronoun is 𒅎(𒋼) ni_{2}(-te) "self", which generally occurs with possessive pronouns attached: 𒅎𒈬 ni_{2}-g̃u_{10} "my-self", etc. The longer form appears in the third person animate (𒅎𒋼𒉌 ni_{2}-te-ni "him/herself", 𒅎𒋼𒉈𒉈 ni_{2}-te-ne-ne "themselves").

==== Adjectives ====
It is controversial whether Sumerian has adjectives at all, since nearly all stems with adjectival meaning are also attested as verb stems and may be conjugated as verbs: 𒈤 maḫ "great" > 𒎏𒀠𒈤 nin al-maḫ "the lady is great". Jagersma believes that there is a distinction in that the few true adjectives cannot be negated, and a few stems are different depending on the part of speech: 𒃲 gal "big", but 𒄖𒌌 gu-ul "be big". Furthermore, stems with adjective-like meaning sometimes occur with the nominalizing suffix /-a/, but their behaviour varies in this respect. Some stems appear to require the suffix always: e.g. 𒆗𒂵 kalag-ga "mighty", 𒊷𒂵 sag_{9}-ga "beautiful", 𒁍𒁕 gid_{2}-da "long" (these are verbs with adjectival meaning according to Jagersma). Some never take the suffix: e.g. 𒃲 gal "big", 𒌉 tur "small" and 𒈤 maḫ "great" (these are genuine adjectives according to Jagersma). Finally, some alternate: 𒍣 zid "right" often occurs as 𒍣𒁕 zid-da (these are pairs of adjectives and verbs derived from them, respectively, according to Jagersma). In the latter case, attempts have been made to find a difference of meaning between the forms with and without -a; it has been suggested that the form with -a expresses a kind of determination, e.g. zid "righteous, true" vs zid-da "right (not left)", or restrictiveness, e.g. 𒂍𒉋 e_{2} gibil "a new house" vs 𒂍𒉋𒆷 e_{2} gibil-la "the new house (as contrasted with the old one)", "a/the newer (kind of) house" or "the newest house", as well as nominalization, e.g. tur-ra "a/the small one" or "a small thing". Other scholars have remained sceptical about the posited contrasts.

A few adjectives, like 𒃲 gal "big" and 𒌉 tur "small" appear to "agree in number" with a preceding noun in the plural by reduplication; with some other adjectives, the meaning seems to be "each of them ADJ". The colour term 𒌓(𒌓) bar_{6}-bar_{6} / babbar "white" appears to have always been reduplicated, and the same may be true of 𒈪 gig_{2} (actually giggig) "black".

To express the comparative or superlative degree, various constructions with the word 𒋛𒀀 dirig "exceed"/"excess" are used: X + locative + dirig-ga "which exceeds (all) X", dirig + X + genitive + terminative "exceeding X", lit. "to the excess of X".

==== Adverbs and adverbial expressions ====
Most commonly, adverbial meanings are expressed by noun phrases in a certain case, e.g. 𒌓 ud-ba "then", lit. "at that time".

There are two main ways to form an adverb of manner:

- There is a dedicated adverbiative suffix 𒂠 -eš_{2}, which can be used to derive adverbs from both adjectives and nouns: 𒍣𒉈𒂠 zid-de_{3}-eš_{2} "rightly", "in the right way", 𒆰𒂠 numun-eš_{2} 'as seeds', 'in the manner of seeds'.
- the enclitic 𒁉 -bi can be added to an adjectival stem: 𒉋𒁉 gibil-bi "newly". This, too, is interpreted by Jagersma as a deadjectival noun with a possessive clitic in the directive case: {gibil.∅.bi-e}, lit. "at its newness". (Note: Jagersma considers the correct reading of the sign 𒁉 bi in the possessive/demonstrative enclitic to be be_{2}.)

For pronominal adverbs, see the section on Pronouns.

==== Numerals ====
Sumerian has a combination decimal and sexagesimal system (for example, 600 is 'ten sixties'), so that the Sumerian lexical numeral system is sexagesimal with 10 as a subbase. The cardinal numerals and ways of forming composite numbers are as follows:

| number | name | explanation notes | cuneiform sign |
|---|---|---|---|
| 1 | diš/deš (aš, dili (Note: These variants are generally not used as counting words, but rather as adjectives meaning "single", "alone" and the like, but there are some indications that they might have functioned as numerals in very early periods or occasionally.)) | | 𒁹 (𒀸) |
| 2 | min | | 𒈫 |
| 3 | eš_{5} | | 𒐈, 𒌍 |
| 4 | limmu | | 𒇹, 𒐉, 𒐼 |
| 5 | ia_{2}/i_{2} | | 𒐊 |
| 6 | aš (Note: With a long vowel due to the origin from a contraction according to Jagersma.) | ia_{2} "five" + aš "one" | 𒐋 |
| 7 | imin/umun_{5}/umin | ia_{2} "five" + min "two" | 𒅓 |
| 8 | ussu | | 𒑄 |
| 9 | ilimmu | ia_{2}/i_{2} (5) + limmu (4) | 𒑆 |
| 10 | u | | 𒌋 |
| 11 | u-diš (?) | | 𒌋𒁹 |
| 20 | niš | | 𒌋𒌋 |
| 30 | ušu_{3} | | 𒌋𒌋𒌋 |
| 40 | nimin | "less two [tens]" | 𒐏 |
| 50 | ninnu | "less ten" | 𒐐 |
| 60 | g̃eš_{2}(d) | | 𒐕, 𒐑 |
| 120 | g̃eš_{2}(d)-min | "two g̃eš_{2}(d)" | 𒐕𒈫 |
| 240 | g̃eš_{2}(d)-limmu | "four g̃eš_{2}(d)" | 𒐕𒐏 |
| 420 | g̃eš_{2}(d)-imin | "seven g̃eš(d)" | 𒐕𒅓 |
| 600 | g̃eš_{2}(d)-u | "ten g̃eš(d)" | 𒐞 |
| 1000 | li-mu-um | borrowed from Akkadian | 𒇷𒈬𒌝 |
| 1200 | g̃eš_{2}(d)-u-min | "two g̃eš_{2}(d)-u" | 𒐞𒈫 |
| 3600 | šar_{2} | "totality" | 𒊹 or 𒄭 |
| 36000 | šar_{2}-u | "ten totalities" | 𒐬 |
| 216000 | šar_{2} gal | "a big totality" | 𒊹𒃲 or 𒄭𒃲 |

Ordinal numerals are formed with the suffix 𒄰𒈠 -kam-ma in Old Sumerian and 𒄰(𒈠) -kam(-ma) (with the final vowel still surfacing in front of enclitics) in subsequent periods. However, a cardinal numeral may also have ordinal meaning sometimes.

The syntax of numerals has some peculiarities. Besides just being placed after a noun like other modifiers (𒌉𒐈 dumu eš_{5} "three children" – which may, however, also be written 𒐈𒌉 3 dumu), the numeral may be reinforced by the copula (𒌉𒐈𒀀𒀭 dumu eš_{5}-am_{3}, lit. "the children, being three". Finally, there is a third construction in which the possessive pronoun 𒁉 -bi is added after the numeral, which gives the whole phrase a definite meaning: 𒌉𒐈𒀀𒁉 dumu eš_{5}-a-bi: "the three children" (lit. 'children – the three of them'). The numerals 𒈫 min "two" and 𒐈 eš_{5} "three" are also supplied with the nominalizing marker -a before the pronoun, as the above example shows.

Fractions are formed with the phrase 𒅆...N...𒅅 igi-N-g̃al_{2} : "one-Nth"; where 𒅅 g̃al_{2} may be omitted. "One-half", however, is 𒋗𒊒𒀀 šu-ru-a, later 𒋗𒊑𒀀 šu-ri-a. Another way of expressing fractions was originally limited to weight measures, specifically fractions of the mina (𒈠𒈾 ma-na): 𒑚 šuššana "one-third" (literarlly "two-sixths"), 𒑛 šanabi "two-thirds" (the former two words are of Akkadian origins), 𒑜 gig̃usila or 𒇲𒌋𒂆 la_{2} gig̃_{4} u "five-sixths" (literally "ten shekels split off (from the mina)" or "(a mina) minus ten shekels", respectively), 𒂆 gig̃_{4} "one-sixtieth", lit. "a shekel" (since a shekel is one-sixtieth of a mina). Smaller fractions are formed by combining these: e.g. one-fifth is 𒌋𒁹𒁹𒂆 "12×1/60 = 1/5", and two-fifths are 𒑚𒇹𒂆 "1/3 + (4 × 1/60) = 5/15 + 1/15 = 6/15 = 2/5".

=== Verbal morphology ===
==== General ====
The Sumerian finite verb distinguishes a number of moods and agrees (more or less consistently) with the subject and the object in person, number and gender. The verb chain may also incorporate pronominal references to the verb's other modifiers, which has also traditionally been described as "agreement", although, in fact, such a reference and the presence of an actual modifier in the clause need not co-occur: not only 𒂍𒂠𒌈𒌈𒅆𒁺𒌦 e_{2}-še_{3} ib_{2}-ši-du-un "I'm going to the house", but also 𒂍𒂠𒉌𒁺𒌦 e_{2}-še_{3} i_{3}-du-un "I'm going to the house" and simply 𒌈𒅆𒁺𒌦 ib_{2}-ši-du-un "I'm going to it" are possible. Hence, the term "cross-reference" instead of "agreement" has been proposed. This article will predominantly use the term "agreement".

The Sumerian verb also makes a binary distinction according to a category that some regard as tense (past vs present-future), others as aspect (perfective vs imperfective), and that will be designated as TA (tense/aspect) in the following. The two members of the opposition entail different conjugation patterns and, at least for many verbs, different stems; they are theory-neutrally referred to with the Akkadian grammatical terms for the two respective forms – ḫamṭu "quick" and marû "slow, fat". (Note: The earliest attestation of these terms is from the Middle Babylonian period. The original Sumerian terms may have been 𒆸 lugud_{2} "short" and 𒁍 gid_{2} "long".) Finally, opinions differ on whether the verb has a passive or a middle voice and how it is expressed.

It is often pointed out that a Sumerian verb does not seem to be strictly limited to only transitive or only intransitive usage: e.g. the verb 𒆭 kur_{9} can mean both "enter" and "insert / bring in", and the verb 𒌣 de_{2} can mean both "flow out" and "pour out". This depends simply on whether an ergative participant causing the event is explicitly mentioned (in the clause and in the agreement markers on the verb). Some have even concluded that instead of speaking about intransitive and transitive verbs, it may be better to speak only of intransitive and transitive constructions in Sumerian.

The verbal root is almost always a monosyllable and, together with various affixes, forms a so-called verbal chain which is described as a sequence of about 15 slots, though the precise models differ. The finite verb has both prefixes and suffixes, while the non-finite verb may only have suffixes. Broadly, the prefixes have been divided in three groups that occur in the following order: modal prefixes, "conjugation prefixes", and pronominal and dimensional prefixes. The suffixes are a future or imperfective marker /-ed-/, pronominal suffixes, and an /-a/ ending that nominalizes the whole verb chain. The overall structure can be summarized as follows:

| slot | modal prefix | "conjugation prefixes" | | | | pronominal prefix 1 | dimensional prefix | pronominal prefix 2 | stem | future/imperfective | pronominal suffix | nominalizer |
| slot | modal prefix | finite prefix | coordinator prefix | ventive prefix | middle prefix | pronominal prefix 1 | dimensional prefix | pronominal prefix 2 | stem | future/imperfective | pronominal suffix | nominalizer |
|---|---|---|---|---|---|---|---|---|---|---|---|---|
| common morphemes | /Ø/-, /ḫa/-, /u/-, /ga/-, /nu/-~/la/- | /i/~/e/-, /a/- | -/nga/- | /mu/-, -/m/- | -/ba/- | -/Ø/-, -/e/~/r/-, -/n(n)/-, -/b/- | -/a/-, -/da/-, -/ta/-, -/ši/-, -/i/-, -/ni/- | -/Ø/-, -/e/~/r/-, -/n(n)/-, -/b/- | | -/e(d)/- | -/en/ -/en/ -/Ø/, -/e/ -/enden/ -/enzen/ -/ene/, -/eš/ | -/a/ |

Examples using most of the above slots may be:

ḫa- -mu- -nn- -a- -b- -šum- -ene
PREC -VEN- -3.SG.AN- -DAT- -3.INAN.O- -give- -3.PL.AN.A/S.IPFV
'Let them give it to him here!'

nu- -i- -b- -ši- -e- -gi_{4}-gi_{4}- -e- -a
NEG- -FIN- -INAN- -TERM- -2.O- -return.IPFV- -3.A.IPFV- -NMLZ
'(one) who does not bring you back to it'

More than one dimensional prefix may occur within the verb chain. If so, the prefixes are placed in a specific order, which is shown the section Dimensional prefixes below. The "conjugation prefixes" appear to be mutually exclusive to a great extent, since the "finite" prefixes /i/~/e/- and /a/- do not appear before [mu]-, /ba/- and the sequence -/b/-+-/i/-, nor does the realization [mu] appear before /ba-/ or /b-i/. However, it is commonly assumed that the spellings im-, im-ma- and im-mi- are equivalent to {i-} + {-mu-}, {i-} + {-mu-} + {-ba-} and {i-} + {-mu-} + {-bi-}, respectively. According to Jagersma, the reason for the restrictions is that the "finite" prefixes /i/~/e/- and /a/- have been elided prehistorically in open syllables, in front of prefixes of the shape CV (consonant-vowel). The exception is the position in front of the locative prefix -/ni/-, the second person dative 𒊏 /-r-a/ and the second person directive 𒊑 /-r-i/, where the dominant dialect of the Old Babylonian period retains them.

==== Modal prefixes ====
The modal prefixes express modality. Some of them are generally combined with certain TAs; in other cases, the meaning of a modal prefix can depend on the TA.

- /Ø-/ is the prefix of the simple indicative mood; in other words, the indicative is unmarked.

E.g.: 𒅔𒅥 in-gu_{7} {Ø-i-n-gu} "He ate it."

- 𒉡 nu- and 𒆷 la-, 𒇷 li- (𒉌 li_{2}- in Ur III spelling) have negative meaning and can be translated as "not". The allomorphs /la-/ and /li-/ are used before the "conjugation prefixes" 𒁀 ba- and 𒉈 bi_{2}-, respectively. A following vowel /i/ or /e/ is contracted with the preceding /u/ of nu- with compensatory lengthening (which is often graphically unexpressed): compare 𒉌𒁺 i_{3}-du "he is walking", but /nu-i-du/ > /nuː-du/ 𒉡𒅇𒁺 nu(-u_{3})-du "he isn't walking". If followed by a consonant, on the other hand, the vowel of nu- appears to have been assimilated to the vowel of the following syllable, because it occasionally appears written as 𒈾 /na-/ in front of a syllable containing /a/.

E.g.: 𒉡𒌦𒅥 nu(-u_{3})-un-gu_{7} {nu-i-n-gu} "He didn't eat it."

- 𒄩 ḫa- / 𒃶 ḫe_{2}- has either precative/optative meaning ("let him do X", "may you do X") or affirmative meaning ("he does this indeed"), partly depending on the type of verb. If the verbal form denotes a transitive action, precative meaning is expressed with the marû form, and affirmative with the ḫamṭu form. In contrast, if the verbal form is intransitive or stative, the TA used is always ḫamṭu. Occasionally the precative/optative form is also used in a conditional sense of "if" or "when". According to Jagersma, the base form is 𒄩 ḫa-, but in open syllables the prefix merges with a following conjugation prefix i_{3}- into 𒃶 ḫe_{2}-. Beginning in the later Old Akkadian period, the spelling also shows assimilation of the vowel of the prefix to 𒃶 ḫe_{2}- in front of a syllable containing /e/; in the Ur III period, there is a tendency to generalize the variant 𒃶 ḫe_{2}-, but in addition further assimilation to 𒄷 ḫu- in front of /u/ is attested and graphic expressions of the latter become common in the Old Babylonian period. Other scholars have contended that 𒃶 ḫe_{2}- was the only allomorph in the Archaic Sumerian period and many have viewed it as the main form of the morpheme.

E.g.: 𒃶𒅁𒅥𒂊 ḫe_{2}-eb-gu_{7}-e {ḫa-ib-gu_{7}-e} "let him eat it!"; 𒄩𒀭𒅥 ḫa-an-gu_{7} "He ate it indeed."

- 𒂵 ga- has cohortative meaning and can be translated as "let me/us do X" or "I will do X". Occasional phonetic spellings show that its vowel is assimilated to following vowels, producing the allomorphs written 𒄄 gi_{4}- and 𒄘 gu_{2}-. It is only used with ḫamṭu stems, but nevertheless uses personal prefixes to express objects, which is otherwise characteristic of the marû conjugation: 𒂵𒉌𒌈𒃻 ga-ni-ib_{2}-g̃ar "let me put it there!". The plural number of the subject was not specially marked until the Old Babylonian period, during which the 1st person plural suffix began to be added: 𒂵𒉌𒌈𒃻𒊑𒂗𒉈𒂗 ga-ni-ib_{2}-g̃ar-re-en-de_{3}-en "let us put it there!".

E.g.: 𒂵𒀊𒅥 ga-ab-gu_{7} "Let me eat it!"

- 𒅇 u_{3}- has prospective meaning ("after/when/if") and is also used as a mild imperative "Please do X". It is only used with ḫamṭu forms. In open syllables, the vowel of the prefix is assimilated to i_{3}- and a- in front of syllables containing these vowels. The prefix acquires an additional /l/ when located immediately before the stem, resulting in the allomorph 𒅇𒌌 u_{3}-ul-.

E.g.: 𒌦𒅥 un-gu_{7} "If/when he eats it..."

- 𒈾 na- has prohibitive / negative optative meaning ("Do not do it!"/"He must not do it!"/"May he not do it!") or affirmative meaning ("he did it indeed"), depending on the TA of verb: it almost always expresses negative meaning with the marû TA and affirmative meaning with the ḫamṭu TA. In its negative usage, it can be said to function as the negation of the precative/optative ḫa-. In affirmative usage, it has been said to signal an emphatic assertion, but some have also claimed that it expresses reported speech (either "traditional orally transmitted knowledge" or someone else's words) or that it introduces following events/states to which it is logically connected ("as X happened (na-), so/then/therefore Y happened"). According to Jagersma and others, "negative na-" and "affirmative na-" are actually two different prefixes, since "negative na-" has the allomorph /nan-/ before a single consonant (written 𒈾𒀭 na-an- or, in front of the labial consonants /b/ and /m/, 𒉆 nam-), whereas "affirmative na-" does not.

E.g.: 𒈾𒀊𒅥𒂊 na-ab-gu_{7}-e "He must not eat it!"; 𒈾𒀭𒅥 na-an-gu_{7} "He ate it indeed."

- 𒁀𒊏 ba-ra- has emphatic negative meaning ("He certainly does/will not do it") or vetitive meaning ("He should not do it!"), although some consider the latter usage rare or non-existent. It can often function as the negation of cohortative ga- and of affirmative ḫa-. It is combined with the marû TA if the verb denies an action (always present or future), and with the ḫamṭu TA if it denies a state (past, present or future) or an action (always in the past). The vetitive meaning requires it to be combined with the marû TA, at least if the action is transitive.

E.g.: 𒁀𒊏𒀊𒅥𒂗 ba-ra-ab-gu_{7}-en "I certainly will not eat it!"; 𒁀𒊏𒀭𒅥 ba-ra-an-gu_{7} "He certainly didn't eat it."

- 𒉡𒍑 nu-uš- is a rare prefix that has been interpreted as having "frustrative" meaning, i.e. as expressing an unrealizable wish ("If only he would do it!"). It occurs both with ḫamṭu and with marû.

E.g.: 𒉡𒍑𒌈𒅥𒂊 nu-uš-ib_{2}-gu_{7}-e "If only he would eat it!"

- 𒅆 ši-, earlier 𒂠 še_{3}-, is a rare prefix, with unclear and disputed meaning, which has been variously described as affirmative ("he does it indeed"), contrapunctive ("correspondingly", "on his part"), as "reconfirming something that already ha(s) been stated or ha(s) occurred", or as "so", "therefore". It occurs both with ḫamṭu and with marû. In Southern Old Sumerian, the vowel alternated between /e/ before open vowels and /i/ before close ones in accordance with the vowel harmony rule of that dialect; later, it displays assimilation of the vowel in an open syllable, depending on the vowel of the following syllable, to /ša-/ (𒊭 ša- / 𒁺 ša_{4}-) and (first attested in Old Babylonian) to 𒋗 šu-.

E.g.: 𒅆𒅔𒅥 ši-in-gu_{7} "So/correspondingly/accordingly(?), he ate it."

Although the modal prefixes are traditionally grouped together in one slot in the verbal chain, their behaviour suggests a certain difference in status: only nu- and ḫa- exhibit morphophonemic evidence of co-occurring with a following finite "conjugation prefix", while the others do not and hence seem to be mutually exclusive with it. For this reason, Jagersma separates the first two as "proclitics" and groups the others together with the finite prefix as (non-proclitic) "preformatives".

==== "Conjugation prefixes" ====
The meaning, structure, identity and even the number of the various "conjugation prefixes" have always been a subject of disagreements. The term "conjugation prefix" simply alludes to the fact that a Sumerian finite verb in the indicative mood must (nearly) always contain one of them. Which of these prefixes is used seems to have, more often than not, no effect on its translation into European languages. Proposed explanations of the choice of conjugation prefix usually revolve around the subtleties of spatial grammar, information structure (focus), verb valency, and, most recently, voice. The following description primarily follows the analysis of Jagersma (2010), largely seconded by Zólyomi (2017) and Sallaberger (2023), in its specifics; nonetheless, most of the interpretations in it are held widely, if not universally.

- 𒉌 i_{3}- (Southern Old Sumerian variant: 𒂊 e- in front of open vowels), sometimes described as a finite prefix, appears to have a neutral finite meaning. As mentioned above, it generally does not occur in front of a prefix or prefix sequence of the shape CV except, in Old Babylonian Sumerian, in front of the locative prefix 𒉌 -/ni/-, the second person dative 𒊏 -/r-a/- and the second person directive 𒊑 -/r-i/-.

E.g.: 𒅔𒁺 in-ře_{6} {Ø-i-n-ře} "He brought (it)."

- 𒀀 a-, with the variant 𒀠 al- used in front of the stem, the other finite prefix, is rare in most Sumerian texts outside of the imperative form, but when it occurs, it usually has stative meaning. It is common in the Northern Old Sumerian dialect, where it can also have a passive meaning. According to Jagersma, it was used in the South as well during the Old Sumerian period, but only in subordinate clauses, where it regularly characterized not only stative verbs in ḫamṭu, but also verbs in marû; in the Neo-Sumerian period, only the pre-stem form al- was still used and it no longer occurred with marû forms. (Note: As a first stage in this development, Jagersma reconstructs a prehistoric Sumerian system where /a/- signalled imperfectivity and /i/- perfectivity, before the marû-ḫamṭu tense-aspect distinction took over that role. ḫamṭu forms with /a/- were interpreted as statives, increasingly marginalised in the South, but given a new additional function in the North as early as the Fara period texts (Jagersma 2010: 548–549).) Like i_{3}-, the prefix a- does not occur in front of a CV sequence except, in Old Babylonian Sumerian, in front of the locative prefix 𒉌 -/ni/-, the second person dative 𒊏 -/r-a/- and the second person directive 𒊑 -/r-i/-.

E.g.: 𒀠𒁺 al-ře_{6} "It is/was brought."

- 𒈬 mu- is most commonly considered to be a ventive prefix, expressing movement towards the speaker or proximity to the speaker; in particular, it is an obligatory part of the 1st person dative form 𒈠 ma- (mu- + -a-). However, many of its occurrences appear to express more subtle and abstract nuances or general senses, which different scholars have sought to pinpoint. They have often been derived from "abstract nearness to the speaker" or "involvement of the speaker". It has been suggested, variously, that mu- may be adding nuances of emotional closeness or alignment of the speaker with the agent or other participants of the event, topicality, foregrounding of the event as something essential to the message with a focus on a person, movement or action directed towards an entity with higher social status, prototypical transitivity with its close association with "control, agency, and animacy" as well as focus or emphasis on the role of the agent, telicity as such or that it is attracted by personal dative prefixes in general, as is the Akkadian ventive.

E.g. 𒈬𒌦𒁺 mu-un-ře_{6} "He brought it here."

- 𒅎 im- and 𒀀𒀭am_{3}- are widely seen as being formally related to mu- and as also having ventive meaning; according to Jagersma, they consist of an allomorph of mu-, namely -/m/-, and the preceding prefixes 𒉌 i_{3}- and 𒀀 a-. In his analysis, these combinations occur in front of a CV sequence, where the vowel -u- of mu- is lost, whereas the historically preceding finite prefix is preserved: */i-mu-ši-g̃en/ > 𒅎𒅆𒁺 im-ši-g̃en "he came for it". In Zólyomi's slightly different analysis, which is supported by Sallaberger, there may also be a -/b/- in the underlying form, which also elicits the allomorph -/m/-: *{i-mu-b-ši-g̃en} > /i-m-b-ši-g̃en/ > /i-m-ši-g̃en/. The vowel of the finite prefix undergoes compensatory lengthening immediately before the stem */i-mu-g̃en/ > 𒉌𒅎𒁺 i_{3}-im-g̃en "he came".

E.g. 𒅎𒁺𒈬 im-tum_{3}-mu {i-mu-b-tum-e} "He will bring it here."

- The vowel of mu- is not elided in front of the locative prefix 𒉌 -ni-, the second person dative 𒊏 /-r-a/ and the second person directive 𒊑 /-r-i/. It may, however, be assimilated to the vowel of the following syllable. (Note: The common denominator is that these sequences begin in a single consonant, which makes the syllable containing /u/ an open syllable. As already seen with a number of other prefixes above, assimilation generally happens in open syllables and not in closed ones. For example, no assimilation happens in the sequence /mu-n-ši-/.) This produces two allomorphs:
  - 𒈪 mi- in the sequences 𒈪𒉌 mi-ni- and 𒈪𒊑 mi-ri-.

E.g. 𒈪𒉌𒅔𒁺 mi-ni-in-ře_{6} "He brought it in here."

  - 𒈠 ma- in the sequence 𒈠𒊏 ma-ra-.

E.g. 𒈠𒊏𒀭𒁺 ma-ra-an-ře_{6} "He brought (it) here to you."

- 𒉈 bi_{2}- (Old Sumerian Lagaš spelling: 𒁉 bi- or be_{2}- in front of open vowels; Old Sumerian Ur spelling: 𒉿 be_{6}-) is usually seen as a sequence of the personal prefix -/b/- and the directive prefix -/i/- or -/e/-.

E.g. 𒉈𒅔𒁺 bi_{2}-in-ře_{6} "He made it (the ox, the group of workers) bring (it)."

- 𒁀 ba- can be analysed as a sequence of the personal prefix /b/- and the dative prefix -/a/-. However, it has been argued that, in spite of this origin, /ba-/ now occupies a slot of its own before the first pronominal prefix and the dimensional prefixes. (Note: In particular, this is shown by the fact that sequences like {ba-n-ši-} and {ba-n-da-} are possible in attested Sumerian (even though {ba-b-ši-} and {ba-b-da-} remain impossible because of the origin of ba-).) In accordance with its assumed origin as b-a-, it has often been observed that ba- appears to have the meaning of a "3rd person inanimate dative": "for it", "to it". However, this explains only some of its occurrences. A number of other apparent meanings and uses of ba- have been noted, and most of these are subsumed by Jagersma under the overarching function of a middle voice marker. They include:
  1. a reflexive indirect object (to do something "for oneself"); (Note: It has been claimed that the reflexive object may also be direct in some cases)
  2. separation and movement "away" from the centre of attention towards a distant goal, especially with motion verbs;
  3. a change of state;
  4. the passive voice, i.e. occurrence with normally transitive verbs when their agent is not mentioned (the latter not in Northern Sumerian according to Jagersma). Some researchers also view it more generally as expressing focus or emphasis on the patient/goal and relatively low transitivity (and thereby as the polar opposite of mu- as they understand it).

E.g. 𒁀𒀭𒁺 ba-an-ře_{6} "He brought it to it" / "He took it for himself" / "He took it away"; 𒁀𒁺 ba-ře_{6} "It was brought."

- 𒅎𒈪 im-mi- (Southern Old Sumerian 𒉌𒈪 i_{3}-mi or, in front of open vowels, 𒂊𒈨 e-me-) and 𒅎𒈠 im-ma- (Southern Old Sumerian 𒂊𒈠 e-ma-) are generally seen as closely related to one another and im-mi- is widely considered to contain the directive prefix -i~e-. One common analysis is that im-mi- and im-ma- represent sequences of im- and bi_{2}- and ba-, respectively, where the consonant /b/ has undergone assimilation to the preceding /m/. Accordingly, their meaning is considered to be simply a combination of the ventive meaning of im- and the meanings of bi_{2}- and ba-, on which see above. This is the analysis espoused by Jagersma and Zólyomi and it is reflected in the schemes and examples in this article. Alternatively, some authors regard im-ma- as a prefix in its own right, and it has sometimes been ascribed a middle voice meaning distinct from the more passive nuance of ba-.

E.g. 𒅎𒈪𒅔𒁺 im-mi-in-ře_{6} "He made it (the ox, the group of workers) bring it here"; 𒅎𒈠𒁺 im-ma-ře_{6} "It was brought here."

- 𒀀𒀭𒈪 am_{3}-mi- and 𒀀𒀭𒈠 am_{3}-ma- are typically analysed along the same lines as im-mi- and im-ma-, but with a preceding am- (from a-) instead of im- (from i-); on the meaning of these see above.

The rare prefix -/nga/- means 'also', 'equally' (often written without the initial /n/, especially in earlier periods). It is of crucial importance for the ordering of the "conjugation prefixes", because it is usually placed between the conjugation prefix /i/- and the pronominal prefix, e.g. 𒅔𒂵𒀭𒍪 in-ga-an-zu 'he, too, knows it', but it precedes the conjugation prefix /mu/-: 𒈾𒂵𒈬𒍪 na-ga-mu-zu 'he also understood it'. This suggests that these two conjugation prefixes must belong to different slots.

Although a conjugation prefix is almost always present, Sumerian until the Old Babylonian period allows a finite verb to begin directly with the locative prefix -/ni/-, the second person singular dative -/r-a/-, or the second person directive -/r-i/- (see below), because the prefixes i_{3}-/e- and a- are apparently elided in front of them.

==== Pronominal and dimensional prefixes ====
The dimensional prefixes of the verb chain basically correspond to, and often repeat, the case markers of the noun phrase. Like the case markers of the noun phrase, the first dimensional prefix is normally attached to a preceding "head" – a pronominal prefix, which expresses the person, gender and number of its referent. The first dimensional prefix may be followed by up to two other dimensional prefixes, but unlike the first one, these prefixes never have an explicit "head" and cannot refer to animate nouns. The other slot where a pronominal prefix can occur is immediately before the stem, where it can have a different allomorph and expresses the person, gender and absolutive or the ergative participant (the transitive subject, the intransitive subject or the direct object), depending on the TA and other factors, as explained below.

There is some variation in the extent to which the verb of a clause that contains a noun in a given case also contains the corresponding pronominal and dimensional prefixes in the verb. The ergative participant is always expressed in the verb, as is, generally, the absolutive one (with some vacillation for the third person singular inanimate in transitive forms, as explained below); the dative, comitative, the locative and directive participant (used in a local meaning) also tend to be expressed relatively consistently; with the ablative and terminative, on the other hand, there is considerable variability. (Note: It has been claimed by some that the marker on the noun can also be omitted when the corresponding verb prefix expresses the same meaning, but this has been interpreted as a purely graphical phenomenon.) There are some cases, specified below, where the meanings of the cases in the noun phrase and in the verb diverge, so a noun case enclitic may not be reflected in the verb or, conversely, a verb may have a prefix that has no specific reference in the clause or in reality.

===== Pronominal prefixes =====
The forms of the pronominal prefixes are the following:

| | prefix | Notes |
|---|---|---|
| 1st person singular | -/ʔ/-? > /‑V-/ (Note: Also -e- in some Old Babylonian texts. Note that -e-, too, had a tendency to assimilate to the preceding vowel.) | The vowel -/V/- is identical to that of the preceding prefix (𒈬𒅇 mu-u_{3}-, 𒁀𒀀 ba-a-, 𒉈𒉌 bi_{2}-i_{3}- etc.). Possibly originally a glottal stop /ʔ/, which was later elided with compensatory lengthening of the preceding vowel. |
| 2nd person singular | 𒂊 -e-, ‑/r/‑ | -/r/- before a vowel (before the dative and the directive prefixes, resulting in 𒊏 -ra- and 𒊑 ‑ri-); -/e/- before a consonant. -/e/- is assimilated to the preceding vowel, lengthening it (e.g. 𒈬𒂊 mu-e- > 𒈬𒅇 mu-u_{3}- etc.) in the dialects attested before the Old Babylonian period. In the Old Babylonian dialect -e- is preserved (e.g. 𒈬𒂊 mu-e-) and the preceding vowel may assimilate to the -/e/- instead: e.g. 𒈨 me-. |
| 3rd person singular animate | ‑/n(n)/- | According to Jagersma and a number of other scholars, the allomorph that appears in front of the vowel-initial dimensional prefixes, i.e. in front of dative -/a/- and directive -/i/-, is a geminate /nn/. (Note: Among other things, the assumption of a geminate allomorph -nn- explains the fact that the finite prefix /i/- occurs in front of the dative prefix sequence written 𒈾 -na- and the directive prefix sequence written 𒉌 -ni-. This would have been unexpected if -n- were a single consonant, because /i/- otherwise never appears in front of a single consonant (unless it is the stem-initial one). It also explains why /mu-/ is sometimes assimilated before the locative ({mu-ni-} mi-ni-), but never before the personal prefix followed by the directive ({mu-nn-i}) mu-ni-/mu-un-ni-.) The traditional view assumes simply /n/. The geminate analysis is assumed in the examples and glosses in this article. |
| 3rd person inanimate | ‑/b/‑ | Seems to be absent in some cases, see the main text. Note that the inanimate agreement marker has no number distinction. |
| 1st person plural | 𒈨 -me- (Note: The 1st person plural dative marker, like the corresponding singular, seems to include the ventive prefix (Jagersma 2010: 390, 410).) | When the prefix is placed immediately before the stem and expresses a transitive subject, the singular is used instead. See the table in Pronominal agreement with subjects and direct objects. As in the singular, the 3rd person animate form begins in a geminate /nn/ according to Jagersma and others. |
| 2nd person plural | 𒂊𒉈 ‑e‑ne-, (Note: Only attested in late texts. For the dative and the directive, the singular form {-r-} is sometimes used with plural reference as well (resulting in {-r-a-} and {-r-i-}, respectively), and this is sometimes combined with the plural suffix {-enzen}, which otherwise normally refers only to subjects and direct objects. This may be an Old Babylonian innovation.) -re-? | When the prefix is placed immediately before the stem and expresses a transitive subject, the singular is used instead. See the table in Pronominal agreement with subjects and direct objects. As in the singular, the 3rd person animate form begins in a geminate /nn/ according to Jagersma and others. |
| 3rd person plural (animate only) | 𒉈 ‑nne- | When the prefix is placed immediately before the stem and expresses a transitive subject, the singular is used instead. See the table in Pronominal agreement with subjects and direct objects. As in the singular, the 3rd person animate form begins in a geminate /nn/ according to Jagersma and others. |

Confusingly, the subject and object prefixes (/-n-/, /-b-/, /-e-/, /-V-/) are not commonly spelled out in early texts, as both coda consonants and vowel length are often ignored in them. The "full" spellings do become more usual during the Third Dynasty of Ur (in the Neo-Sumerian period) and especially during the Old Babylonian period. Thus, in earlier texts, one finds 𒈬𒀝 mu-ak and 𒉌𒀝 i_{3}-ak (𒂊𒀝 e-ak in Southern Sumerian) instead of 𒈬𒌦𒀝 mu-un-ak and 𒅔𒀝 in-ak for {mu-n-ak} and {i-n-ak} "he/she made", and also 𒈬𒀝 mu-ak instead of Neo-Sumerian 𒈬(𒅇)𒀝 mu(-u_{3})-ak or Old Babylonian 𒈬𒂊𒀝 mu-e-ak "you made". Vowel length never came to be expressed systematically, so the 1st person prefix was often graphically -∅- during the entire existence of Sumerian.

===== Dimensional prefixes =====
The generally recognized dimensional prefixes are shown in the table below; if several occur within the same verb complex, they are placed in the order they are listed in.

| dative | comitative | ablative | terminative | directive | locative |
|---|---|---|---|---|---|
| /-a-/ (Note: However, the plural pronominal markers seldom take the dative marker and never take the directive marker; intead, they express a dative or directive participant on their own (although there are some attestations of the expected /-ne-a/ and /-me-a/ from the Ur III period and Old Babylonian periods.) | 𒁕 -da- (𒋾 -di_{3}- (Note: The allomorph -di_{3}- is used before the locative prefix /-ni-/).) The variant 𒉈 de_{3} / 𒉈 𒋼 de_{4}, found in Old Babylonian Sumerian, is the result of the contraction of -da- and a following -e-, but sometimes also seems to occur because of assimilation to a preceding -e-: /ba-e-da-/ > /ba-e-de-/.) (Note: Thomsen and Foxvog believe that there is also an allomorph /-ra-/ used between vowels. Jagersma (2010) generally assumes idiosyncratic case use in such cases.)) | 𒋫 -ta- (𒊏 -/ra/-) (Note: The allomorph -ra- is used after vowels.) | 𒅆 -ši- (early 𒂠 -še_{3}-) | -/i/-~-/e/- 𒂊 (Note: However, the plural pronominal markers seldom take the dative marker and never take the directive marker; instead, they express a dative or directive participant on their own (although there are some attestations of the expected /-ne-a/ and /-me-a/ from the Ur III period and Old Babylonian periods.) (Note: According to Jagersma (2010: 476–482) and Zólyomi (2017: 206, 215), the allomorph -i- is used after consonant, while -e- is used after vowels. In the latter case, -e- may be assimilated to the preceding vowel, while the vowel undergoes compensatory lengthening: 𒈬𒂊 mu-e- > 𒈬𒅇 mu-u_{3}- etc. In Old Babylonian Sumerian, it is the preceding vowel that assimilated to -e-: 𒁕𒂊 -da-e- > 𒉈 de_{3} The prefix does not seem to surface at all between a vowel and a subject/object prefix as in ma_{2}-a mu-na-*(e)-n-g̃ar "he loaded it on the boat for her". This restricts the possibilities of the co-occurrence of directive forms and forces the grammar to choose which participant to express: e.g. the dative prefixes and ba- take precedence over the inanimate directive -b-i, while there is vacillation in the choice between prioritizing it or the locative (Jagersma 2010: 442–444).) | 𒉌 -ni- (Note: The locative prefix is unique in that it is never attached to a pronominal prefix, but rather combines in itself the pronominal and dimensional meanings, meaning "there" or "in there".) |

The ablative does not co-occur with the terminative, and the directive does not co-occur with the locative, so these pairs may be argued to share the same slot. (Note: For this reason, it appears that a directive participant is sometimes untypically cross-referenced with a dative prefix in order to allow the locative to also occur in the verb form (/b-i-/, but /b-a-ni-/).) Accordingly, the template can be said to include the following dimensional slots: dative, comitative, ablative/terminative, directive/locative.

A major exception from the general system of personal and dimensional prefixes is the very frequent prefix 𒉌 -ni- "(in) there", which corresponds to a noun phrase in the locative, but does not seem to be preceded by any pronominal prefix and has demonstrative meaning by itself. This prefix is not to be confused with the homographic sequence 𒉌 -ni- which corresponds to an animate noun phrase in the directive. In the latter case, ni is analysed as a combination of pronominal /-nn-/ and directive /-i-/ (roughly: "at him/her", "on him/her", etc.), whereas in the former, ni is unanalysable.

An example of a verb chain where several dimensional slots are occupied can be:

i- -nn- -a- -ta- -ni- -n- -ed
FIN- -3.SG.AN- -DAT- -ABL- -LOC- -3.AN.A- -go.out
'He made it (the dike) go out of it (a canal) for him into it (a locality)'

The comitative prefix -da- can, in addition, express the meaning "to be able to". In that case, there is a preceding pronominal prefix agreeing with the subject of the action: e.g. {nu-mu-e-da-n-dab-en} "you cannot catch him" (lit. 'you won't catch him with yourself'). The directive has the meaning "on(to)" when the verb is combined with a noun in the locative case: e.g. {banšur-a ninda b-i-b-g̃a-g̃a-en} "I will put bread on the table".

===== Differences and combinations between dimensional prefixes and noun case markers =====
While the meanings of the prefixes are generally the same as those of the corresponding nominal case markers, there are some differences:

- The prefixes, unlike noun phrases in the corresponding cases, normally refer only to participants with a strong relationship to the action or state expressed by the verb (e.g. a temporal meaning like since X may be expressed by means of a noun phrase with a -ta case marker, but that normally would not be cross-referenced with a -ta prefix on the verb).
- The use of dimensional prefixes is sometimes more closely connected to special meanings of specific verbs and to lexical idiosyncrasies. For instance, the verb 𒇯𒁺 ed_{3} has the meaning "go up" with the directive prefix, but "go down" with the ablative one, the verb 𒉚 sa_{10} means "sell" with the ablative prefix and "buy" with the terminative, the verb 𒌓𒁺 ed_{2} "leave, go out" always has the ablative prefix, and the phrasal verb 𒅗 ... 𒄄 inim ... gi_{4} "answer" (lit. 'return a word') always includes the locative. In general, verbs having a place-related meaning such as 𒁄 bala "cross", 𒅅 g̃al_{2} "be (somewhere), 𒃻 g̃ar "put", 𒁺 gub "stand", 𒆭 kur_{9} "enter", 𒋛 sig_{9} "put" and 𒆪 tuš "sit" generally occur with a dimensional prefix specifying a location. Thus, a verb may, albeit rarely, contain a dimensional prefix that simply modifies its meaning and has no reference. In such cases, it has no preceding pronominal prefix, even if it is the first dimensional prefix: e.g. 𒁀𒊏𒀭𒉚 ba-ra-an-sa_{10} {ba-ta-n-sa} "he sold it".
- The directive may be replaced by the dative when its slot is occupied by the locative or when it would have had animate reference, but there is a preceding prefix, which makes any further prefixes with animate reference illicit.

At the systemic level, there are some asymmetries between the nominal case markers and the verbal dimensional prefixes: they partly make different distinctions, and the nominal case marking is influenced by animacy. Because of these mismatches, different meanings are expressed by combinations of matching or non-matching noun cases and verb prefixes. The combinations may be summarized as follows:

| meaning (Note: Zólyomi (2017: 201–222) refers to the "in(to)", "on(to)" and "at" constructions as "locative1", "locative2" and "locative3", respectively. Jagersma (2010: 416–428) refers to the "at" construction as the "oblique object".) | nominal case marker (inanimate) | nominal case marker (animate) | verbal prefix | example (inanimate) | example (animate) |
|---|---|---|---|---|---|
| inessive "in(to)" | -/a/ (locative) | ---- | -/ni/- (locative) | {e-a i-ni-n-g̃ar} "he placed it in the house" | ---- |
| superessive "on(to)" | -/a/ (locative) | -/ra/ (dative) | -/i/~/e/- (directive) | {e-a b-i-n-g̃ar} "he placed it on the house" | {lu-ra i-nn-i-n-g̃ar} "he placed it on the man" |
| adessive "at" / causee | -/e/ (directive) | -/ra/ (dative) | -/i/~/e/- (directive) | {e-e b-i-n-tag} "he touched the house" | {lu-ra i-nn-i-n-tag} "he touched the man" |
| dative | -/e/ (directive) | -/ra/ (dative) | -/a/- (dative) | {e-e b-a-n-šum} "he gave it to the house" | {lu-ra i-nn-a-n-šum} "he gave it to the man" |

In some cases, there are also mismatches between nominal and verbal markers when exact correspondences would have been possible; these may serve to express additional shades of meaning. A dative noun case marker and terminative dimensional prefix may co-occur in the Ur III period. In general, from that time on, the choice of noun cases begins to be influenced by the government of corresponding Akkadian verbs, while the verbs themselves retain their older prefixes. According to Foxvog, /-ni-/ can resume non-locative cases such as the terminative and the dative.

A peculiar pattern of agreement occurs in what has been referred to as an external possession construction, in which a modifier of the verb refers to a certain object, almost always a body part, but it is emphasised that the action affects the possessor of that object (cf. English "he hit me on the head"). In that case, the verb may agree with the possessor with the directive prefix, while not agreeing with the object itself: thus, "he put barley in your hand" may be expressed by {šu-z(u).a še i-r-i-n-g̃ar}, lit. "he put barley at you, in your hand". Alternatively, it may agree with both the possessor and the object: the possessor is then referred to by the dative prefix: {šu-z(u)-a še (i-)r-a-ni-n-g̃ar}, lit. "he put barley to you, in there, in your hand".

====== Use of the ventive as a 1st person marker ======
When the dimensional prefix is dative -/a/-, the personal prefix of the 1st person appears to be absent, but the 1st person reference is expressed by the choice of the ventive conjugation prefix /mu/-. The sequence that expresses the 1st person dative is then: /mu-/ + /-a-/ → 𒈠 ma-. When the intended meaning is that of the directive -/i/~/e/- ("on me", "in contact with me", etc.), it seems that the ventive conjugation prefix 𒈬 mu- alone serves to express it.

====== Syncope of /i/ in -/ni/- and -/bi/- ======
Two special phenomena occur if there is no absolutive–ergative pronominal prefix in the pre-stem position.

1. The sequences 𒉌 -/ni/- (locative {-ni-} and personal + directive {-nn-i-}) and 𒉈 /bi/- (personal + directive {b-i-}) acquire the forms -/n/- and -/b/- (coinciding with the absolutive–ergative pronominal prefixes) before the stem if there is not already an absolutive–ergative pronominal prefix in pre-stem position. This is typically the case when the verb is used intransitively. For example, the normal appearance of -ni- is seen in:

- {mu-ni-n-kur} "he brought (it) in" (lit. 'caused it') to go in)' > /muninkur/, written 𒈬𒉌𒆭 mu-ni-kur_{9} in early texts, later 𒈬𒉌𒅔𒆭 mu-ni-in-kur_{9}.

In contrast, in an intransitive form, we find a syncopated realization:

- {mu-ni-kur} "he went in" > /muːnkur/, written 𒈬𒆭 mu-kur_{9} in early texts, later 𒈬𒌦𒆭 mu-un-kur_{9}.

The preceding vowel undergoes compensatory lengthening, which is sometimes indicated by its doubling in the spelling:

- {i-ni-kur} > i_{3}-in-kur_{9} 𒉌𒅔𒆭 "he went in".

Likewise, the normal realisation of bi- is seen in:

- {i-b-i-n-si} > bi_{2}-in-si 𒉈𒅔𒋛 "he loaded (it) on it".

This is to be contrasted with the syncopated version in an intransitive form:

- {i-b-i-si} > i_{3}-ib_{2}-si 𒉌𒌈𒋛 "(it) was loaded on it".

The same phonological pattern is claimed to account for the alternation between the forms of the ventive prefix. The standard appearance is seen in:

{i-mu-n-ak} > mu-un-ak 𒈬𒌦𒀝 "he did it here".

In an intransitive form, however, we find:

{i-mu-g̃en} > i_{3}-im-g̃en 𒉌𒅎𒁺 "he came here".

====== Expression of the directive by a pre-stem personal prefix ======
A superficially very similar, but distinct phenomenon is that if there is not already an absolutive–ergative pronominal prefix in pre-stem position, the personal prefix of the directive participant does not receive the dimensional prefix -/i/~/e/- at all and is moved to the pre-stem position. For example, the normal position of the directive participant is seen in:

- {b-i-n-ak} bi_{2}-in-ak 𒉈𒅔𒀝 "he applied (it) to it" (said of oil).

In contrast, in an intransitive form, we find:

- {ba-b-ak} ba-ab-ak 𒁀𒀊𒀝 "it was applied to it".

In the same way, the normal position is seen in:

- {b-i-n-us} bi_{2}-in-us_{2} 𒉈𒅔𒍑 ≈ "he adjoined (it) to it".

This can be contrasted with an intransitive form:

- {i-b-us} ib_{2}-us_{2} 𒌈𒍑 ≈ "(it) was adjoined to it".

====== Absence of {-b-} ======
In some cases, the 3rd person inanimate prefix -b- appears to be unexpectedly absent.

- -b- as the head of a dimensional prefix is not used after the "conjugation prefix" ba-: thus *𒁀𒀊𒅆𒌈𒄄𒄄 ba-ab-ši-ib_{2}-gi_{4}-gi_{4} "he will return it to it (for himself)" is impossible. This restriction does not, however, apply for -b- as a subject/object prefix immediately before the stem: thus, 𒁀𒀊𒄄𒄄 ba-ab-gi_{4}-gi_{4} "he will return it (for himself)" is possible. In some schemes, this is formalized as the placement of the initial pronominal prefix b- in the same slot as ba- and not in the following slot, where all the other initial pronominal prefixes such as -n- are located.
- -b- also regularly "fails" to appear after the ventive "conjugation prefix" mu-: instead of expected *𒈬𒌒𒅆𒁺 mu-ub-ši-g̃en, the meaning "he came for it" is expressed by 𒅎𒅆𒁺 im-ši-g̃en. Similarly, instead of *𒈬𒌒𒂷𒂷 mu-ub-g̃a_{2}-g̃a_{2} for "he is placing it here", we find 𒉌𒅎𒂷𒂷 i_{3}-im-g̃a_{2}-g̃a_{2}. (Note: Occasional exceptions from this restriction occur only in Old Babylonian texts (Jagersma 2010: 509).) While some believe that /b/ in this case is truly omitted, others assume that such forms in fact contain an assimilated sequence -/mb/- > -/mm/- > -/m/-, just like the forms im-mi- and im-ma-, so that the above realisations actually stand for {i-m-b-ši-g̃en} and {i-m-b-g̃a-g̃a}.
- For another case of absence of -b-, see the footnote on -b- as a marker of the transitive object in the table in the section on Pronominal agreement in conjugation.

==== Pronominal suffixes ====
The pronominal suffixes are as follows:

| | marû | ḫamṭu |
|---|---|---|
| 1st person singular | 𒂗 -en | |
| 2nd person singular | 𒂗 -en | |
| 3rd person singular | (𒂊) -e | /-Ø/ |
| 1st person plural | 𒂗𒉈𒂗 -en-de_{3}-en | |
| 2nd person plural | 𒂗𒍢𒂗 -en-ze_{2}-en | |
| 3rd person plural (animate only) | (𒂊)𒉈 -e-ne | 𒂠/𒌍 -eš_{2}/eš |

The initial vowel in all of the above suffixes can be assimilated to the vowel of the verb root; more specifically, it can become /u/ or /i/ if the vowel of the verb root is /u/ or /i/, respectively. It can also undergo contraction with an immediately preceding vowel. Pre-Ur III texts also spell the first- and second-person suffix -/en/ as -/e/, making it coincide with the third person in the marû form.

==== Pronominal agreement with subjects and direct objects ====
Sumerian verbal agreement follows a nominative–accusative pattern in the 1st and 2nd persons of the marû tense-aspect, but an ergative–absolutive pattern in most other forms of the indicative mood. Because of this presence of both patterns, Sumerian is considered a language with split ergativity. The general principle is that in the ḫamṭu TA, the transitive subject is expressed by the prefix, and the direct object by the suffix, and in the marû TA it is the other way round. For example, {i-b-dab-en} can be a ḫamṭu form meaning "it caught me", where {-b-} expresses the subject "it" and {-en} expresses the object "I". However, it can also be a marû form meaning "I will catch it", where {-en} expresses the subject "I" and {-b-} expresses the object "it". As for the intransitive subject, it is expressed, in both TAs, by the suffixes. For example, {i-kaš-en} is "I ran", and {i-kaš-ed-en} can be "I will run". This means that the intransitive subject is treated like the object in ḫamṭu (which makes the ḫamṭu pattern ergative) and like the subject in marû (which makes the marû pattern nominative-accusative).

There are two exceptions from the above generalization:

1. A transitive subject of the third person in marû uses unique suffixes that are not the same as those of the intransitive subject and the ḫamṭu direct object. For example, while "they ran" can be {i-kaš-eš}, just as "it caught them" can be {i-b-dab-eš}, the corresponding form for "they will catch it" would be {i-b-dab-ene}. This pattern can be described as a case of tripartite alignment.

2. A plural transitive subject in the ḫamṭu TA is expressed not only by the prefix, but also by the suffix: e.g. {i-n-dab-eš} can mean "they caught (it)". Specifically, the prefix expresses only the person, while the suffix expresses both the person and the number of the subject.

Note that the prefixes of the plural transitive subject are identical to those of the singular – -/V/-, -/e/-, -/n/- – as opposed to the special plural forms -me-, -e-ne-, -ne- found in non-pre-stem position.

The use of the personal affixes for subjects and direct objects can be summarized as follows:

| | ḫamṭu | | | marû | | |
| | Direct object | Intransitive subject | Transitive subject | Direct object | Intransitive subject | Transitive subject |
|---|---|---|---|---|---|---|
| 1st sing | ...-/en/ | ...-/en/ | -/V/ (Note: In Old Babylonian texts, -e- for the 1st person singular may occur, making it identical with the 2nd person singular just as they are identical in the suffixes, but this may be the result of a late analogy (Edzard 2003: 87, cf. Michalowski 2007).)-... | -/V/ (Note: A significant minority of Sumerologists believe that the prefixes of the 1st and 2nd person are /-en-/ rather than /-V-/ and /-e-/ when they stand for the object (i.e. in marû). That would be indistinguishable in writing (and even possibly, according to some, also in speech) from the 3rd person animate -n-.)-... | ...-/en/ | ...-/en/ |
| 2nd sing | ...-/en/ | ...-/en/ | -/e/-... | -/e/ (Note: A significant minority of Sumerologists believe that the prefixes of the 1st and 2nd person are /-en-/ rather than /-e-/ when they stand for the object (i.e. in marû); that would often be indistinguishable from the 3rd person animate -n-.)-... | ...-/en/ | ...-/en/ |
| 3rd sing animate | ...-/Ø/ | ...-/Ø/ | -/n/-... | -/n/-... | ...-/Ø/ | ...-/e/ |
| 3rd inanimate (Note: The inanimate agreement marker has no number distinction.) | ...-/Ø/ | ...-/Ø/ | -/b/-... | -/b/- (Note: According to several researchers, -/b/- as a direct object marker may be absent under conditions that are not entirely clear; in particular, several verbs such as 𒌣 de_{2} "pour", 𒆕 řu_{2} "build", 𒃻 g̃ar "put" and 𒂊 e "say" very often (but not always) lack it.) | ...-/Ø/ | ...-/e/ |
| 1st pl | ...-/enden/ | ...-/enden/ | -/V/-...-/enden/ | -/me/-? | ...-/enden/ | ...-/enden/ |
| 2nd pl | ...-/enzen/ | ...-/enzen/ | -/e/-...-/enzen/ | -/e-ne/-? | ...-/enzen/ | ...-/enzen/ |
| 3rd pl (animate only) | ...-/eš/ | ...-/eš/ | -/n/-...-/eš/ | -/ne/-, (Note: -/nne/- with geminate /n/ according to Jagersma (2010: 339–340)) -/b/- (Note: The morpheme -/ne/- for the 3rd person animate plural subject was used in Old Sumerian and was replaced by -/b/- in Neo-Sumerian.) | ...-/eš/ | ...-/ene/ |

Examples for TA and pronominal agreement: (ḫamṭu is rendered with past tense, marû with present):

- {i-gub-en} (𒉌𒁺𒁉𒂗): "I stood" or "I stand"
- {i-n-gub-en} (𒅔𒁺𒁉𒂗): "he placed me" or "I place him"
- {i-sug-enden} (𒉌𒁻𒂗𒉈𒂗): "we stood/stand"
- {i-n-dim-enden} (𒅔𒁶𒂗𒉈𒂗): "he created us" or "we create him"
- {mu-V-dim-enden} (𒈬𒁶𒂗𒉈𒂗): "we created [someone or something]"
- {i-b-gub-e} (𒌈𒁺𒁉) "he places it"
- {i-b-dim-ene} (𒌈𒁶𒈨𒉈): "they create it"
- {i-n-dim-eš} (𒅔𒁶𒈨𒌍): "they created [someone or something]" or "he created them"
- {i-sug-eš} (𒉌𒁻𒄀𒌍): "they stood" or "they stand".

==== Stem ====
The verbal stem itself can also express grammatical distinctions within the categories number and tense-aspect. In a number of verbs, this involves suppletion or morphonological alternations that are not fully predictable.

1. With respect to number, plurality can be expressed by complete reduplication of the ḫamṭu stem (e.g. 𒆭𒆭 kur_{9}-kur_{9} "enter (pl.)" or by a suppletive stem (e.g. 𒁺 gub "stand (sing.)" – 𒁻 sug_{2} "stand (pl.)". The traditional view is that both of these morphological means express plurality of the absolutive participant in Sumerian. However, it has often been pointed out that complete reduplication of the verb in Sumerian can also express "plurality of the action itself" intensity or iterativity, and that it is not obligatory in the presence of plural participants, but rather seems to expressly emphasize the plurality. According to some researchers, the predominant meaning of the suppletive plural stem is, indeed, plurality of the most affected participants, whereas the predominant meaning of complete reduplication is plurality of events (because they occur at multiple times or locations). However, even with suppletive plural stems, the singular may occur with a plural participant, presumably because the event is perceived as a single one.

2. With respect to tense-aspect marking, verbs are divided in four types; ḫamṭu is always the unmarked TA.

- The stems of the 1st type, regular verbs, are analysed in two ways: some scholars believe that they do not express TA at all, while others claim that they express marû TA by adding a suffix -/e/ as in 𒁶𒂊 dim_{2}-e vs 𒁶 dim_{2} "make". This -/e/ would, however, nowhere be distinguishable from the first vowel of the pronominal suffixes except for intransitive marû 3rd person singular; in that last form, the first analysis attributes the -/e/ to the presence of the -/e(d)/ suffix described below. The glosses in this article assume the first analysis.
- The 2nd type expresses marû by partial reduplication of the stem, e.g. 𒆭 kur_{9} vs 𒆭𒆭 ku_{4}-ku_{4} "enter". Usually, as in this example, this marû reduplication follows the pattern C_{1}V_{1}-C_{1}V_{1} (C_{1} = 1st consonant of the root, V = 1st vowel of the root). In a few cases, the template is instead C_{1}V_{1}C_{1}C_{2}V_{1}.
- The 3rd type expresses marû by adding a consonant, e.g. te vs teg̃_{3} "approach" (both written 𒋼). A number of scholars do not recognise the existence of such a class or consider it dubious. (Note: Jagersma (2010: 311) treats this as a suppletive stem. As another instance of the same pattern, Zólyomi (2017) cites 𒌓𒁺 e_{3} vs ed_{2}. Foxvog (2010: 120) points out that this class has at most these two members and considers its status to be suspect.)
- The 4th type uses a suppletive stem, e.g. 𒅗 dug_{4} vs 𒂊 e "do, say". Thus, as many as four different suppletive stems can exist, as in the admittedly extreme case of the verb "to go": 𒁺 g̃en ("to go", ḫamṭu sing.), 𒁺 du (marû sing.), (𒂊)𒁻 (e-)re_{7} (ḫamṭu plur.), 𒁻 sub_{2} (marû plur.).

The following tables show some of the most frequent stem alternations. (Note: More unpredictable stem alternations of Sumerian verbs, specifically marû reduplicating stems, are indicated in the catalogue of verbs in Thomsen (2001: 295–323) and in Halloran (1999).)

Verbs with suppletive plurals
| singular | plural | meaning |
|---|---|---|
| 𒁺 gub | 𒁻 sug_{2} | "stand" |
| 𒋾 til_{2} (𒇻 lug for animals) | 𒅊 se_{12}/sig_{7} | "live" |
| 𒁺 tum_{2} | 𒁺𒁺 laḫ_{5} (Note: In addition, Sallaberger (2020: 59) believes that there was an additional stem used in Old Sumerian specifically for leading animals, namely 𒊏 ra.) | "lead"/"carry countable objects"? (Note: Traditionally, this verb was considered a four-stem verb with the alternation ře_{6} (sing. ḫamṭu), tum_{2}/tum_{3} (sing. marû), laḫ_{4} (plur. ḫamṭu and marû)); newer research has promoted a split into two verbs, although there are disagreements about the semantic/functional difference between them.) |
| 𒆭 kur_{9} | 𒁔 sun_{5} | "enter" (the use of the suppletive plural stem seems to be optional) |

Verbs with suppletive marû forms
| singular | | plural | | meaning |
| ḫamṭu | marû | ḫamṭu | marû | meaning |
|---|---|---|---|---|
| 𒅗 dug_{4} | 𒂊 e (marû participle 𒁲 di(-d)) | | | "do", "say" |
| 𒁺 g̃en | 𒁺 du | (𒂊)𒁻 (e-)re_{7} | 𒁻 sub_{2} | "go" |
| 𒁺 ře_{6} (Note: Traditionally, this verb was considered a four stem verb with the alternation ře_{6} (sing. ḫamṭu), tum_{2}/tum_{3} (sing. marû), laḫ_{4} (plur. ḫamṭu and marû); newer research has prompted a split into two verbs.) | 𒉐 tum_{3} (Note: The stem 𒉐 tum_{3} has, exceptionally, a ḫamṭu agreement pattern in spite of the verb itself being used with marû meaning".: e.g. 𒁀𒀭𒉐 ba-an-tum_{3} "he will take it away" (Jagersma 2010: 266–367).) | -------------- | | "carry", "bring"/"carry an uncountable mass"? (Note: Traditionally, this verb was considered a four stem verb with the alternation ře_{6} (sing. ḫamṭu), tum_{2}/tum_{3} (sing. marû), laḫ_{4} (plur. ḫamṭu and marû); newer research has prompted a split into two verbs.) |
| 𒆪 tuš | 𒆪 dur_{2} (Note: 𒆪 suš in intransitive usage and dur in transitive usage "to seat, set" according to Sallaberger (2023: 57). Cf. Foxvog (2016: 82) citing Attinger.) | 𒂉 durun (Note: Often also written 𒂉𒂉 durun_{x}, 𒂉𒊒𒌦 dur_{2}-ru-un.) | | "sit", "live somewhere" |
| 𒁁 uš_{4} | 𒁁 ug_{7}/𒂦 ug_{5} | | | "die" |

Frequent verbs with reduplicating marû forms
| ḫamṭu | marû | meaning |
|---|---|---|
| 𒉋 bil_{2} | 𒉋𒉋 BIL_{2}-BIL_{2} (Note: The use of capitals indicate that the pronunciation of the reduplicated stem is unknown or uncertain.) | burn |
| 𒊑 deg_{x} | 𒊑𒊑 de_{5}-de_{5} | gather |
| 𒂄 dun | DUN-DUN | string up together |
| 𒁔 dun_{5} | DUN_{5}-DUN_{5} | swing |
| 𒅍𒂷/𒅍 gag̃ | ga_{6}-ga_{6} | carry |
| 𒄄 gi_{4} | gi_{4}-gi_{4} | turn |
| 𒁽 gir_{5} | GIR_{5}-GIR_{5} | slip, dive |
| 𒆥 gur_{10} | GUR_{10}-GUR_{10} | reap |
| 𒃻 g̃ar | 𒂷𒂷 g̃a_{2}-g̃a_{2} | put |
| 𒄩𒆷 ḫa-la | 𒄬𒄩 ḫal-ḫa | divide |
| 𒅆𒌨 ḫulu | 𒅆𒌨𒄷 ḫulu-ḫu /ḫulḫu/ | be bad, destroy |
| 𒆥 kig̃_{2} | KIG̃_{2}-KIG̃_{2} | seek |
| 𒆭 kur_{9} | ku_{4}-ku_{4} | enter |
| 𒊬 mu_{2} | mu_{2}-mu_{2} | grow |
| 𒌆 mur_{10} | mu_{4}-mu_{4} | dress |
| 𒅘 nag̃ | na_{8}-na_{8} | drink |
| 𒆸𒆸 nig̃in | 𒆸𒆸 ni_{10}-ni_{10}, 𒉈𒉈 ne-ne | go around |
| 𒊏 raḫ_{2} | ra-ra | hit |
| 𒉚 sa_{10} | sa_{10}-sa_{10} | barter |
| 𒋛 si | si-si | fill |
| 𒋢 sug_{6} | su_{2}-su_{2} | repay |
| 𒂞 šeš_{2} | še_{8}-še_{8} | anoint, (Note: Only in post-Ur III texts (Jagersma 2010: 312–314)) cry |
| 𒌋 šuš, 𒋙 šuš_{2} | 𒌋𒌋 šu_{4}-šu_{4}, 𒋙𒋙 šu_{2}-šu_{2} | cover |
| 𒋺 taka_{4} | da_{13}-da_{13} | leave behind |
| 𒋼𒂗 te-en | te-en-te | cool off |
| 𒋗𒉀 tu_{5} | tu_{5}-tu_{5} | bathe in |
| 𒌇 tuku | du_{12}-du_{12} | have |
| 𒋳 tuku_{5} | TUKU_{5}-TUKU_{5} | weave |
| 𒅇 ...𒆪 u_{3} ...ku_{4} | u_{3} ...ku_{4}-ku_{4} | sleep |
| 𒍣 zig_{3} | zi-zi | rise |
| 𒍪 zu | zu-zu | learn, inform |

==== The modal or imperfective suffix -/ed/ ====
Before the pronominal suffixes, a suffix -/ed/ or -/d/ can be inserted (the /d/ is only realized if other vowels follow, in which case the /e/ in turn may be elided): e.g. 𒉌𒀄(𒂊)𒉈𒂗 i_{3}-zaḫ_{3}(-e)-de_{3}-en {i-zaḫ-ed-en} "I will/must escape", 𒉌𒀄𒂊 i_{3}-zaḫ_{3}-e {i-zaḫ-ed} "he will/must escape". This suffix is considered to account for occurrences of -e in the third-person singular marû of intransitive forms by those who do not accept the theory that -e itself is a marû stem formant.

The function of the suffix is somewhat controversial. Some view it as having a primarily modal meaning of "must" or "can" or future meaning. Others believe that it primarily signals simply the imperfective status of a verb form, i.e. a marû form, although its presence is obligatory only in intransitive marû forms and in non-finite forms. In intransitive forms, it thus helps to distinguish marû from ḫamṭu; for instance, in the above example, 𒉌𒀄𒂗 i_{3}-zaḫ_{3}-en alone, without -/ed/-, could have been interpreted as a ḫamṭu form "I escaped". In contrast, in the analysis of scholars who do not believe that -/ed/- is obligatory in marû, many intransitive forms like i_{3}-zaḫ_{3}-en can be both ḫamṭu and marû. (Note: In some analyses, this is because the forms are morphologically identical: 1st and 2nd person singular is {i-zaḫ-en} and even 3rd person singular is {i-zaḫ} in both ḫamṭu and marû. In others, it is because the /-e/ of the imperfective stem suffix is not visible in front of the person suffixes: 1st and 2nd person singular ḫamṭu {i-zaḫ-en} and marû {i-zaḫ-e-en} are written identically.)

The vowel /e/ of this suffix undergoes the same allophonic changes as the initial /e/ of the person suffixes. It is regularly assimilated to /u/ in front of stems containing the vowel /u/ and a following labial consonant, /r/ or /l/, e.g. 𒋧𒈬𒁕 šum_{2}-mu(-d) (< {šum-ed}). It is also assimilated and contracted with immediately preceding vowels, e.g. 𒄄 gi_{4}-gi_{4} /gi-gi-i(d)/ < {gi-gi-ed} "which will/should return". The verb 𒁺 du "go" never takes the suffix.

==== Use of the tense-aspect forms ====
Jagersma systematizes the use of the tense-aspect forms in the following patterns:

- ḫamṭu is used to express completed (perfective) actions in the past, but also states (past or present) and timeless truths. It is also used in conditional clauses with the conjunction 𒋗𒃻𒌉𒇲𒁉 tukumbi 'if'.
- marû is used to express actions in the present and future, but also non-completed (imperfective) actions in the past (like the English past progressive tense), and, rarely, actions in the past that are still relevant or operative (like the English present perfect tense). It is also used in conditional clauses with the conjunction 𒌓𒁕 ud-da 'if'. Verba dicendi introducing direct speech are also placed in marû.

In addition, different moods often require either a ḫamṭu or a marû stem and either a ḫamṭu or a marû agreement pattern depending on various conditions, as specified in the relevant sections above and below.

In more general terms, modern scholars usually state that the difference between the two forms is primarily one of aspect: ḫamṭu expresses perfective aspect, i.e. a completed action, or sometimes possibly punctual aspect, whereas marû expresses imperfective aspect, i.e. a non-completed action, or sometimes possibly durative aspect. In contrast, the time at which the action takes place or at which it is completed or non-completed is not specified and may be either past, present or future. This contrasts with the earlier view, prevalent in the first half of the 20th century, according to which the difference was one of tense: ḫamṭu was thought to express the past (preterite) tense, and marû was considered to express present-future tense, while the use of marû with past-tense reference was viewed as a stylistic device (cf. the so-called historical present use in other languages). Indeed, it has been pointed out that a translation of ḫamṭu with past tense and marû with present or future tense does work well most of the time; this may correspond to the cases in which the action was viewed by Sumerian speakers as completed or non-completed with respect to the present moment. (Note: In fact, Zólyomi (2017: 123–124) retains the terminology of tense, preterite for ḫamṭu and present-future for marû, but describes them as expressing anterior actions (ḫamṭu) vs simultaneous or posterior actions (marû) relative to a reference point which is not necessarily the present and is not specified by the verb form itself.)

==== The imperative mood ====
The imperative mood construction is produced with a ḫamṭu stem, but using the marû agreement pattern, by turning all prefixes into suffixes. In the plural, the second person plural ending is attached in a form that differs slightly from the indicative: it is /-(n)zen/, with the -/n/- appearing only after vowels. The stem is singular even in the plural imperative. Compare the following indicative-imperative pairs:

| Indicative | Imperative |
|---|---|
| mu- -nn- -a- -b- -šum- -e VEN- -3.SG.AN- -DAT- -3.INAN.O- -give- -3.AN.A "He will give it to him here." | šum- -mu- -nn- -a- -b give- -VEN- -3.SG.AN- -DAT- -3.INAN.O "Give it to him here!" |
| mu- -nn- -a- -b- -šum- -enzen VEN- -3.SG.AN- -DAT- -3.INAN.O- -give- -2.PL "You (plur.) will give it to him" | šum- -mu- -nn- -a- -b- -zen give- -VEN- -3.SG.AN- -DAT- -3.INAN.O- -2.PL.A/S.IMP 'Give (plur.) it to him here!' |

This may be compared with the French pair vous le lui donnez, but donnez-le-lui!

In addition, the prefix 𒉌 i_{3}- is replaced by /-a/: 𒉌𒁺 i_{3}-g̃en "he went", but 𒁺𒈾 g̃en-na "go!", 𒅔𒈾𒀊𒁉 in-na-ab-be2 "he will say it to him", but 𒅗𒂵𒀭𒈾(𒀊) dug_{4}-ga-an-na(-ab) 'say it to him!'. However, the vowel /e/ and possibly /i/ occasionally also occur if no further prefixes follow, perhaps as a characteristic of southern dialects. The ventive prefix mu-, if not followed by others, has the form 𒌝 -um in the imperative: 𒁺𒌝 ře_{6}-um 'bring it here!' In Old Babylonian texts, the reduced form -/u/ and the more regular -/am/ {-a-m} are also found: 𒂷𒉡 g̃e_{26}-nu, 𒁺𒀀𒀭 g̃en-am_{3}, both "come here!"

==== Participles ====
Sumerian participles can function both as verbal adjectives and as verbal nouns. As verbal adjectives, they can describe any participant involved in the action or state expressed by the verb: for instance, 𒋧𒈠 šum_{2}-ma may mean either "(which was) given (to someone)", "who was given (something)" or "who gave". As verbal nouns, they denote the action or state itself, so 𒋧𒈠 šum_{2}-ma may also mean '(the act of) giving' or 'the fact that X gave Y'. Participles are formed in the following ways:

- The bare ḫamṭu stem can function as a participle. It usually expresses timeless truths: 𒋧 šum_{2} may be a person who regularly/constantly gives, something regularly given, or the regular act of giving.
- Another way to form participles is by means of adding the nominalizing marker -/a/ to the ḫamṭu stem: 𒋧𒈠 šum_{2}-ma "given". The verb form constructed in this way characterizes an entity with a specific action or state in the past or a state in the present (𒋾𒆷 til_{3}-la "alive"). The verbs 𒌇 tuku "have" and 𒍪 zu "know" usually omit the ending -/a/, as does the verb 𒀝 ak "do". According to Jagersma, the nominalizing marker had the effect of geminating the preceding consonant (e.g. /šumːa/), which is evident from Akkadian loanwords, and this effect was due to its original form being /ʔa/ with a glottal stop that later assimilated to preceding consonants (/šumʔa/ > šumːa).
- The marû stem can be combined with the suffix -/ed/ to form another participle, which often has a future and modal meaning similar to the Latin gerundive, e.g. 𒁶𒈨 dim_{2}-me(-d) "which will/should be made". Adding a locative-terminative marker /-e/ after the /-ed/ yields a form with a meaning similar to the Latin ad + gerund (acc.) construction: 𒁶(𒈨)𒉈 dim_{2}(-me)-de_{3} = "(in order) to make". A similar meaning can be expressed by adding the locative marker: 𒁶(𒈨)𒁕 dim_{2}(-me)-da = "(for it) to be made". The main difference is that in the construction with -(ed)-e, the subject of the intended action is the same as the subject of the main clause, while it is different in the construction with -(ed)-a. The analysis of this participle is controversial along the same lines as that of the meaning of the suffix -ed in finite forms (see above). Some Sumerologists describe its meaning as primarily modal and distinguish it from a separate imperfective participle that consists of the marû stem alone, e.g. 𒁶𒈨 dim_{2}-me 'which is/was making', 𒄄𒄄 gi_{4}-gi_{4} "returning". Others believe that it this is also the normal marû participle and that it has, in addition, the imperfective meanings "which is/was cutting" and "which is/was being cut". Besides the allomorphy of the suffix -/ed/ already treated above, the verb 𒅗 dug_{4} "do, say" has a suppletive participial stem in this form: 𒁲 di(-d).
- The marû stem can also occur with the suffix -/a/. Nonetheless, according to Jagersma, this form is rare outside the combination with a following possessive pronominal marker to express temporal meaning, as explained in the Syntax section: e.g. 𒁶(𒈨)𒁕𒉌 dim_{2}(-me)-da-ni "when he makes (something)".

==== Copula verb ====
The copula verb /me/ "to be" is mostly used in an enclitic form. Its conjugation is as follows:

| | singular | plural |
|---|---|---|
| 1st person | 𒈨𒂗 -me-en | 𒈨𒂗𒉈𒂗 -me-en-de_{3}-en |
| 2nd person | 𒈨𒂗 -me-en | 𒈨𒂗𒍢𒂗 -me-en-ze_{2}-en |
| 3rd person | 𒀀𒀭 -am_{3} (Old Sumerian 𒀭 -am_{6}) | 𒀭𒈨𒌍 -me-eš |

In addition, the initial vowel of the form -am_{3} is reduced to -/m/ after enclitics ending in a vowel: 𒂍𒈬𒌝 e_{2}-g̃u_{10}-um "it is my house". Like other final consonants, the -m may not be expressed in early spelling.

These enclitic forms are used instead of a simple sequence of finite prefix, root and personal suffix *i_{3}-me-en, *i-me etc. For more complex forms, the independent copula form is used: 𒉌𒈨𒀀 i_{3}-me-a "that he is", 𒉡𒅇𒈨𒂗 nu-u_{3}-me-en "I am not". Unlike the enclitic, it typically uses the normal stem 𒈨 -me- in the 3rd person singular (𒁀𒊏𒈨 ba-ra-me "should not be"), except for the form prefixed with ḫa-, which is 𒃶𒅎 ḫe_{2}-em or 𒃶𒀀𒀭 ḫe_{2}-am_{3}.

For a negative equivalent of the copula in the 3rd person, it seems that the word 𒉡 nu "not" alone instead of *nu-um is used predicatively (e.g. 𒍏𒉡 urud nu "it is not copper") although the form 𒉡(𒌦)𒂵𒀀𒀭 nu-(un)-ga-am_{3} "it is also not ..." is attested. A different word is used to express existence or being present/located somewhere: 𒅅 g̃al_{2}.

A peculiar feature of the copula is that it seems to form a relative clause without the nominalizing suffix /-a/ and thus uses the finite form: thus, instead of 𒉌𒈨𒀀 i_{3}-me-a, simply 𒀀𒀭 -am_{3} is used: 𒆬𒃻𒂵𒊏𒉌𒅎𒈠𒀭𒋧 kug nig̃_{2}-gur_{11}-ra-ni-im ma-an-šum_{2} "he gave me silver (which) was his property", which appears to say "The silver was his property, he gave it to me". In the negative, the full form 𒉡𒈨𒀀 nu-me-a "which is not" is used, and likewise in non-relative functions.

==== Passive voice ====
Some scholars believe that it is possible to speak of a passive voice in Sumerian. Jagersma (2010) distinguishes three attested passive constructions. In each case, the ergative participant and the corresponding agreement marker on the verb are removed, so that the verb is inflected intransitively, but there may also be some additional cues to ensure a passive interpretation. The passive may be formed:

1. By simply eliminating the agent of a transitive verb and the corresponding agreement marker: {engar-e e i-n-řu} "the farmer built the house" > † {e i-řu} "the house was built". As a dynamic passive, in reference to the event itself, this construction is obsolete in ḫamṭu by the time of the earliest records according to Jagersma. However, it is still used with modal prefixes and in marû: e.g. {e ḫa-i-řu} "May the house be built!" Moreover, it continues to be used as a stative passive in Southern Sumerian, so {e i-řu} can mean "the house is built (i.e. complete)".
2. With the prefix 𒁀 ba-, e.g. {e ba-řu}. This is only found in Southern Sumerian and expresses only a dynamic passive, i.e. it refers to the event itself: "The house was (came to be) built". (Note: Edzard (2003: 95) believes that this use of ba- first occurs in Neo-Sumerian, but Jagersma (2010: 496) states that it was already present in Old Sumerian.)
3. With the prefix {a-}, e.g. {e al-řu}. This is only found in Northern Sumerian and can have both a stative and a dynamic sense: "The house is built (complete)" or "The house was (came to be) built".

The agent is never expressed in the passive clause in Sumerian.

While the existence of such intransitive constructions of normally transitive verbs is widely recognized, some other scholars have disputed the view that these constructions should be called "passives". They prefer to speak of one-participant or agentless constructions and to limit themselves to the observation that the prefixes ba- and a- tend to be preferred with such constructions, apparently as a secondary effect of another, more subtle feature of their meaning. Concerning the history of the constructions, it has been claimed that the passive(-like) use of ba- does not appear before the Ur III period; Jagersma, on the contrary, states that it is attested already in the Old Sumerian period, although it becomes especially frequent in Ur III times.

A different construction has been posited and labelled "Sumerian passive voice" by a significant number of scholars. According to them, too, a passive is formed by removing the ergative participant and the verbal marker that agrees with it, but the verb is not inflected as an intransitive one: instead, it has a personal prefix, which refers to the "logical object": {e i-b-řu} or {e ba-b-řu} "the house is being built". The stem is always ḫamṭu. Some consider this construction to have only the function and meaning of a marû form, while others consider the tense-aspect opposition to be neutralized in it. The personal prefix is nearly always -b- in identified cases; views differ on whether it agrees in gender with an animate logical object, appearing as -n-, or whether it remains -b-. Critics have argued that most alleged examples of the construction are actually instances of the pre-stem personal prefix referring to the directive participant in an intransitive verb, at least before the Old Babylonian period. Pascal Attinger considers it plausible that the original construction was indeed a directive one, whereas its new passive function as described by him arose via a reinterpretation in the Old Babylonian period; Walther Sallaberger, on the contrary, believes this kind of passive to be characteristic of Neo-Sumerian and to have been lost in Old Babylonian. A further possibility is that at least some of these cases actually have an impersonal 3rd person inanimate subject: "'it' has / they have built the house".

==== Causative construction ====
Sumerian does not have dedicated causative morphology. Causativity is expressed syntactically in two ways, depending on the transitivity of the verb.

1. An intransitive verb is made transitive and thus acquires causative meaning merely by adding an ergative participant and the appropriate agreement marker: {gud i-gub} "the ox stood" – {engar-e gud i-n-gub} "the farmer made the ox stand".
2. A transitive verb is made causative by placing the ergative participant in the directive: {engar-e gud-e u b-i-n-gu} "the farmer made the ox eat grass". For animates, as usual, the directive case marker is replaced by the dative one: {engar-e dumu-ra ninda i-nn-i-n-gu} "the farmer made the child eat bread". A further example can be {dig̃ir-e engar-ra gud i-nn-i-n-gub}: "the god made the farmer make the ox stand".
3. The causative constructions can in turn be passivized using the prefix ba-: {gud ba-gub} "the ox was caused to stand", {gud-e u ba-b-gu} "the ox was caused to eat grass" (lit. 'grass was caused to be eaten by the ox'), {dumu-ra ninda ba-n-gu} "the child was caused to eat bread".

In Old Babylonian Sumerian, new causative markers have been claimed to have arisen under the influence of Akkadian; this is explained in the section on Interference from Akkadian and other late phenomena.

==== Phrasal verbs ====
A specific problem of Sumerian syntax is posed by the numerous phrasal verbs (traditionally called "compound verbs" in Sumerology in spite of the fact that they are not compounds, but idiomatic combinations). They usually involve a noun immediately before the verb, forming a lexical/idiomatic unit: e.g. 𒅆...𒂃 igi ...du_{8}, lit. "open the eye" = "see, look". Their case government and agreement patterns vary depending on the specific verb. (Note: Some information regarding the case markers governed by individual Sumerian verbs is listed in the verb catalogue of Thomsen (2001: 295–323).) The component noun is usually in the absolutive case, but may be in the directive. If the phrasal verb takes another noun as a "logical object", the verbal infix is typically the directive, while the noun case is most commonly either the directive (dative if animate), which otherwise has the meaning "at / with respect to", or the locative (dative if animate), which otherwise has the meaning "on":

- Directive:
  - 𒅆...𒂃 igi ...du_{8} ({NOUN-e igi ...-e~i-...du}), lit. "open the eye at something" > "see"
  - 𒆥...𒀝 kig̃_{2} ...ak, lit. "do work with respect to something" > "work (on) something"
  - 𒋗𒋳...𒅗 šu-tag ...dug_{4}, lit. "do hand-touching with respect to something" > "decorate"
  - 𒊓...𒅗 sa_{2} dug_{4}, lit. "do equal with respect to something" > "reach"
  - 𒄑...𒋳 g̃eš ...tag, lit. "make wood touch 'at' something" > "sacrifice something".
  - 𒋛...𒁲 si ...sa_{2} ({NOUN-e si ...-e~i-...sa}), lit. "make the horns(?) equal with respect to something" > "put something in order"; likewise used intransitively: {NOUN-e si b-i-sa}, lit. "the horns (?) are equal with respect to something" > "something is in order".
- Locative "on":
  - 𒅗...𒃻 inim ...g̃ar ({NOUN-a inim ...-e~i-...g̃ar}), lit. "place a word on something" > "claim, place a claim on"
  - 𒋗...𒁇 šu ...bar, lit. "open / remove the hand on something" > "release"
  - 𒈬...𒄷𒈿 mu ...sa_{4}, lit. "call a name on someone" > "to name"
  - 𒉆...𒋻 nam ...tar, lit. "cut a fate upon someone" > "determine the fate of someone"
  - 𒀠...𒆕 al ...řu_{2}, lit. "raise the hoe upon something" > "dig"
  - 𒇷...𒋻 en_{3} ...tar, lit. "cut a question(?) on something" > "investigate"

Less commonly, the case of the logical object and the pronominal infix may be:

- Dative (directive if inanimate):
  - 𒆠...𒉘 ki ...ag̃_{2} ({NOUN-ra ki ...ag̃}) lit. "to measure out a place for someone" = "to love someone"
  - 𒅗 ...𒌣 gu_{3} ...de_{2}, lit. "to pour out the voice for someone" = "to call for someone"
  - 𒀀 ...𒊒 a ...ru, lit. "to eject water for someone" = "to dedicate something to someone"
- Terminative: 𒅆 ...𒁇 igi ...bar (NOUN-še igi ...bar) lit. "bring out the eye towards something" = "see, look"
- Comitative: 𒀉 ...𒉘 a_{2} ...ag̃_{2} ({NOUN-da a ...ag̃}) lit. "measure out power (?) with someone" = "to give orders to someone"
- Locative "in":
  - 𒋗... 𒁍 šu ...gid_{2} ({NOUN-a šu ... gid}), lit. "stretch out the hand into something" = "to perform extispicy on"
  - 𒋗... 𒁄 šu ...bala, lit. "let one's hand go across in something" = "alter"

Another possibility is for the component noun to be in the dative (directive if inanimate), while the object is in the absolutive:

- 𒋗...𒋾 šu ...ti ({šu-e NOUN ...ti}) lit. "make something come close to the hand" = "to receive something" ("from someone" is expressed by the terminative: {NOUN_{2}-še šu-e NOUN_{1} ...ti})

=== Syntax ===
==== General features ====
The basic word order is subject–object–verb; verb finality is only violated in rare instances, in poetry. The moving of a constituent towards the beginning of the phrase may be a way to highlight it, as may the addition of the copula to it. Modifiers (adjectives, genitive phrases etc.) are normally placed after the noun: 𒂍𒉋 e_{2} gibil "a new house" 𒂍𒈗𒆷 e_{2} lugal-la "the house of the owner". However, the so-called anticipatory genitive (𒂍𒀀𒈗𒉈 e_{2}-a lugal-bi "the owner of the house", lit. "of the house, its owner") is common and may signal the possessor's topicality. There are no adpositions, but noun phrases in a certain case may resemble prepositions and have a similar function:

- 𒊮...𒀀𒅗 šag_{4} X-a-ka, lit. "in the heart of X" = "inside/among X".
- 𒅆 ... 𒀀𒂠 igi X-a-še_{3}, lit. "for the eyes of X" = "in front of X".
- 𒂕...𒀀𒅗 egir X-a-ka, lit. "at the back of X" = "behind/after X".
- 𒀀𒅗...𒀀𒅗 X ugu_{2} X-a-ka, lit. "on the skull of X" = "on top of X", "concerning X"
- 𒁇...𒀀𒅗 bar X-a-ka, lit. "outside of X" = "because of X" (in Old Sumerian).
- 𒈬/𒉆 ... 𒀀𒂠 mu/nam X-a-še_{3}, lit. "for the name/fate of X" = "because of X" (in Neo-Sumerian).

==== Subordinate clauses ====
There are various ways to express subordination. Many of them include the nominalization of a finite verb with the suffix -/a/, which is also used to form participles, as shown above. Like the participles, this nominalized clause can either modify a noun, as adjectives do, or refer to the event itself, as nouns do. It usually functions as a relative clause, corresponding to an English clause with "which ..." or "who ...", as in the following example:

lu e i-n-řu-a
man house FIN-3.A-build-NMLZ
"the man who built the house"

Like the participles, the relative clauses can describe any participant involved in the action or state expressed by the verb, and the specific participant is determined by context: e.g. 𒈬𒌦𒈾𒀭𒋧𒈠 {mu-nna-n-šum-a} can be "which he gave to him", "who gave (something) to him", etc. The nominalized clause can also be a complement clause, corresponding to an English clause with "that ...", e.g. e_{2} in-řu_{2}-a (in-zu) "(he knows) that he built the house". Like a noun, it can be followed by case morphemes:

- In the locative case (with added 𒀀 -a), it means "when": e_{2} in-řu_{2}-a-a "when he built the house" (more literally "in his building of the house"), although this is more common in Old Sumerian.
- In the ablative case (with added 𒋫 -ta), it means "after" or "since": e_{2} in-řu_{2}-a-ta "after he built the house"; the particle 𒊑 -ri may express the same meaning as 𒋫 -ta.
- In the terminative case (with added 𒂠 -še_{3}), it has a meaning close to "before" or "as to the fact that": e_{2} nu-řu_{2}-a-še_{3} "while he had not yet built the house".
- In the equative case (with added 𒁶 -gen_{7}), it can mean "as (if)", "as (when)", "when" or "because": e_{2} in-řu_{2}-a-gen_{7} "as he built the house".
- It can also host the enclitics -/akanam/ and -/akeš/ "because": e_{2} in-řu_{2}-a-ka-nam "because he built the house".
- More surprisingly, it can add both the genitive and the locative morpheme with a meaning close to "when", possibly "as soon as": (e_{2} in-řu_{2}-a-(a-)ka) "as soon as he built the house".

The nominalized clause can directly modify a noun expressing time such as 𒌓 ud "day, time", 𒈬 mu "year" and 𒌗 itid "month", and this in turn can then stand in the locative and ablative in the same meanings as the clauses themselves: ud e_{2} in-řu_{2}-a-a/ta "when/after he built the house". In this case, the particle -bi sometimes precedes the case morpheme: ud e_{2} in-řu_{2}-a-ba; the basic meaning is still of "when".

The nominalized clause can also be included in the various "prepositional constructions" mentioned above:

- bar e_{2} in-řu_{2}-a-ka "because he built the house" (in Old Sumerian)
- mu X-a-še_{3} "because he built the house" (in Neo-Sumerian),
- egir e_{2} in-řu_{2}-a-ka "after he built the house".

The structure is shown more clearly in the following example:

egir amaru ba-ur-a-ak-ta
back flood MID-sweep.over-NMLZ-GEN-ABL
"after the Flood had swept over"

Several clauses can be nominalized by a single {-a} enclitic: {kaʾa ba-zaḫ engar-e nu-i-b-dab-a b-i-n-dug} "he said that the fox had escaped and the farmer had not caught it".

Participles can function in a very similar way to the nominalized clauses and be combined with the same kinds of adjuncts. One peculiarity is that, unlike nominalized clauses, they may also express the agent as a possessor, in the genitive case: 𒂍𒆕𒀀𒈗𒆷 e_{2} řu_{2}-a lugal-la "the house built by the king". However, when the head noun (e_{2}) is specified as here, a more common construction uses the ergative: 𒂍𒈗𒂊𒆕𒀀 e_{2} lugal-e řu_{2}-a.

A special subordinating construction with the temporal meaning of an English when-clause is the so-called pronominal conjugation, which contains a verb nominalized with -/a/ and following possessive pronominal markers referring to the subject (transitive or intransitive). In the 3rd person, the form appears to end in the possessive pronominal marker alone: 𒆭𒊏𒉌 kur_{9}-ra-ni "when he entered", lit. "his entering", etc. It has been suggested that these forms actually also contain a final directive marker -e; in this example, the analysis would be {kur-a-ni-e}, "at his entering". Similarly, in Old Babylonian Sumerian, one sometimes finds the locative or ablative markers after the possessive (kur_{9}-ra-na, kur_{9}-ra-ni-ta). In contrast, in the 1st and 2nd persons, the 1st and 2nd person pronouns are followed by the syllable 𒉈 -ne: (Note: Especially in earlier scholarship, the sign 𒉈 was read in this context as de_{3}. The -ne has been variously interpreted as an obsolete locative ending, producing the interpretation of {zig-a-g̃u-ne} as 'at my rising' or as identical to the demonstrative enclitic -ne "this".) 𒍣𒂵𒈬𒉈 zig_{3}-ga-g̃u_{10}-ne "as I rose"). The verb itself may be in ḫamṭu, as in the above examples, or in marû followed by the modal/imperfective suffix -/ed/-: 𒍣𒍣𒁕𒈬𒉈 zi-zi-da-g̃u_{10}-ne "when I rise". The same construction is used with the word 𒀸 dili "alone": 𒀸𒈬𒉈 dili-g̃u_{10}-ne "I alone", etc.

Subordinating conjunctions such as 𒌓𒁕 ud-da "when, if", 𒋗𒃻𒌉𒇲𒁉 tukum-bi "if" and 𒂗𒈾 en-na "until" also exist.

==== Coordination ====
Coordinating conjunctions are rarely used. The most common way to express the sense of "and" is by simple juxtaposition. Nominal phrases may be conjoined, perhaps emphatically, by adding 𒁉 -bi to the second one: 𒀭𒂗𒆤𒀭𒎏𒆤𒉌 en-lil_{2} nin-lil_{2}-bi "both Enlil and Ninlil"; sometimes the enclitic is further reinforced by 𒁕 -da "with". More surprisingly, 𒋫 -ta "from" is also sometimes used in the sense of "and". The word 𒅇 u_{3} "and" was borrowed from Akkadian in the Old Akkadian period and occurs mostly in relatively colloquial texts; Old Babylonian Sumerian also borrowed from Akkadian the enclitic 𒈠 -ma "and". There is no conjunction "or" and its sense can also be expressed by simple juxtaposition; a more explicit and emphatic alternative is the repetition of 𒃶𒅎 ḫe_{2}-em, "let it be": 𒇻𒃶𒅎𒈧𒃶𒅎 udu ḫe_{2}-em maš ḫe_{2}-em "(be it) a sheep or a goat".

==== Other issues ====
A quotative particle -/(e)še/ or -/ši/ "saying", variously spelt 𒂠 -eše_{2}, 𒅆 -ši or 𒀪𒊺 -e-še, has been identified. Its use is not obligatory and it is attested only or almost only in texts from the Old Babylonian period or later. Another, rarely attested, particle, 𒄑(𒊺)𒂗 -g̃eš(-še)-en, apparently expresses irrealis modality: "were it that ...".

Highlighting uses of the copula somewhat similar to English cleft constructions are present: 𒈗𒀀𒀭𒉌𒁺 lugal-am_{3} i_{3}-g̃en "It is the king who came", 𒀀𒈾𒀸𒀀𒀭𒉌𒁺 a-na-aš-am_{3} i_{3}-g̃en "Why is it that he came?", 𒉌𒁺𒈾𒀀𒀭 i_{3}-g̃en "It is the case that he came".

Sumerian generally links a nominal predicate to the subject using the copula verb, like English. However, it does use zero-copula constructions in some contexts. In interrogative sentences, the 3rd person copula is omitted: 𒀀𒈾𒈬𒍪 a-na mu-zu "What is your name?", 𒉈𒂗𒈬𒍪 ne-en mu-zu "Is this your name?". Sumerian proper names that consist of entire sentences normally lack a copula as well, e.g. 𒀀𒁀𒀭𒌓𒁶 a-ba ^{d}utu-gen_{7} "Who is like Utu?" As explained above, negative sentences also omit the copula in *nu-am_{3}/nu-um "isn't" and use simply 𒉡 nu instead.

Yes/no-interrogative sentences appear to have been marked only by intonation and possibly by resulting lengthening of final vowels. There is no wh-movement to the beginning of the clause, but the interrogative words are placed immediately before the verb: e.g. 𒈗𒂊𒀀𒈾𒈬𒌦𒀝 lugal-e a-na mu-un-ak "What did the king do?", 𒂍𒀀𒁀𒀀𒅔𒆕 e_{2} a-ba-a in-řu_{3} "Who built the temple?" Two exceptions from this are that the constituent noun of a phrasal verb is normally closer to the verb, and that an interrogative word emphasized with a copula such as 𒀀𒈾𒀸𒀀𒀭 a-na-aš-am_{3} "why is it that ...?" is placed at the beginning of the clause. In addition, as already mentioned, interrogative sentences omit the copula where a declarative would have used it.

=== Word formation ===
Derivation by affixation is largely non-existent. An exception may be a few nouns ending in -/u/ denoting the object of a corresponding verb: 𒊬𒊒 sar-ru "document" < 𒊬 sar "write". Compounding, on the other hand, is common in nouns. Compounds are normally left-headed. The dependent may be:

- Another noun: 𒂍 e_{2} "house" + 𒈬 muḫaldim "cook" > 𒂍𒈬 e_{2}-muḫaldim "kitchen"
- An adjective: 𒌨 ur "dog" + 𒈤maḫ "great" > 𒌨𒈤 ur-maḫ "lion"
- A participle (consisting of the bare verb stem): 𒃻 nig̃_{2} "thing" + 𒁀 ba "give(n)" > 𒃻𒁀 nig̃_{2}-ba "present",
- A participle with a dependent word: 𒃻 nig̃_{2} "thing" + 𒍣 zi "breath" + 𒅅 g̃al_{2} "be there" > 𒃻𒍣𒅅 nig̃_{2}-zi-g̃al_{2} "living thing"

An older obsolete pattern was right-headed instead:

- 𒂍 e_{2} "house" + 𒊮 šag_{4} "heart" > 𒂍𒊮 e_{2}-šag_{4} "innermost part of a house"
- 𒃲 gal "big" + 𒈜 nar "musician" > 𒃲𒈜 gal-nar "chief musician"

A participle may be the head of the compound, preceded by a dependent:

- 𒁾 dub "clay tablet" + 𒊬 sar "write" > 𒁾𒊬 dub-sar "scribe"
- 𒋗 šu "hand" + 𒋳 tag "touch" > 𒋗𒋳 šu-tag "decoration" (corresponding to the phrasal verb 𒋗...𒋳 šu...tag "decorate")

There are a few cases of nominalized finite verbs, too: 𒁀𒍗 ba-uš_{4} "(who) has died" > "dead"

Abstract nouns are formed as compounds headed by the word 𒉆 nam- "fate, status": 𒌉 dumu "child" > 𒉆𒌉 nam-dumu "childhood", 𒋻 tar "cut, decide" > 𒉆𒋻 nam-tar "fate". Nouns that express the object of an action or an object possessing a characteristic are formed as compounds headed by the word 𒃻 nig̃_{2} "thing": 𒅥 gu_{4} "eat" > 𒃻𒅥 nig̃_{2}-gu_{7} "food", 𒄭 "good, sweet" > 𒃻𒄭 nig̃_{2}-dug "something sweet". The meaning may also be abstract: 𒋛...𒁲 si...sa_{2} "straighten, put in order" > nig̃_{2}-si-sa_{2} "justice". A small number of terms of professions are derived with the preposed element 𒉡 nu-: 𒄑𒊬 ^{g̃eš}kiri_{6} "garden" > 𒉡𒄑𒊬 nu-^{g̃eš}kiri_{6}-(k) "gardener".

Apparent coordinative compounds also exist, e.g. 𒀭𒆠 an-ki "the universe", lit. "heaven and earth".

A noun can be formed from an adjective by conversion: for example, 𒂼 dag̃al "wide" also means "width".

On verbs acquiring the properties of adjectives and nouns (agent nouns and action nouns), see the section on Participles.

While new verbs cannot be derived, verbal meanings may be expressed by phrasal verbs (see above); in particular, new phrasal verbs are often formed on the basis of nouns by making them the object of the verbs 𒅗 dug_{4} "do" or 𒀝 ak "make": 𒀀...𒅗 a ...dug_{4}, lit. "to do water" > "to irrigate", 𒄑𒂵...𒍮 ^{g̃eš}ga-rig_{2} ...ak, lit. "to do the comb" > "to comb".

== Dialects ==
The standard variety of Sumerian was Emegir (𒅴𒂠: eme-gir_{15}). A notable variety or sociolect was Emesal (𒅴𒊩: eme-sal), possibly to be interpreted as "fine tongue" or "high-pitched voice". Other apparent terms for registers or dialects were eme-galam "high tongue", eme-si-sa_{2} "straight tongue", eme-te-na_{2} "oblique[?] tongue", emesukudda, emesuha, emesidi and emeku. Recently, a regional differentiation into a Northern and a Southern Sumerian dialect area has been posited.

=== Emesal ===
Emesal is used exclusively by female characters in some literary texts. In addition, it is dominant in certain genres of cult songs such as the hymns sung by Gala priests. It has been argued that it might have been a female language variety of the kind that exists or has existed in some cultures, such as among the Chukchis and the Garifuna. Alternatively, it has been contended that it must have been originally a regional dialect, since instances of apparent Emesal-like forms are attested in the area of late 3rd millennium Lagash, and some loanwords into Akkadian appear to come from Emesal rather than Emegir. Apart from such isolated glosses, Emesal is first attested in writing in the early Old Babylonian period. It is typically written with syllable signs rather than logograms. A text is often not written consistently in Emesal, but contains apparent Emegir forms as well.

The special features of Emesal are mostly phonological and lexical. In terms of phonology, the following are some of the most common sound correspondences:

| Emegir sound | Emesal sound | Emegir example | Emesal example | Meaning |
|---|---|---|---|---|
| g̃ (/ŋ/) | m (Note: However, occasionally the opposite correspondence occurs: Emegir 𒅗 inim "word" – Emesal 𒂊𒉈𒉘 e-ne-eg̃_{3}) | 𒂷 g̃e_{26} | 𒈨 me | "I" |
| d | z | 𒇻 udu | 𒂊𒍢 e-ze_{2} | "sheep" |
| g | b | 𒅆 igi | 𒄿𒉈 i-bi_{2} | "eye" |
| i | u | 𒉺𒇻 sipad | 𒁻𒁀 su_{8}-ba | "shepherd" |

There are also specifically Emesal lexemes that do not seem to be cognate with their Emegir counterparts, for example:

| Emegir | Emesal | |
|---|---|---|
| 𒎏 nin | 𒂵𒊭𒀭 ga-ša-an, later spelling 𒃽 gašan | "lady" |
| 𒀀𒈾 a-na | 𒋫 ta | "what" |
| 𒁺 tum_{2} | 𒅕 ir | "bring" |

In grammar, both the cohortative prefix 𒂵 ga- and the precative prefix 𒄩 ḫa- are replaced by the morpheme 𒁕 da- (with the allomorphs 𒉈 de_{3}- and 𒂅 du_{5}- conditioned by context in the same way as that of the corresponding Emegir prefixes).

=== Southern and Northern Sumerian ===
Bram Jagersma and Gábor Zólyomi distinguish two regional dialects of Sumerian: the Southern Sumerian dialect of Lagash, Umma, Ur and Uruk, which eventually formed the basis for the common standard of the Neo-Sumerian (Ur III) period, and the Northern Sumerian dialect as seen in texts from Nippur, Adab, Isin and Shuruppak (although eventually texts in the standard variety begin to be produced in that area as well). The differences that he finds between the two varieties are:

- In Southern Sumerian, the conjugation prefix 𒉌 /i/- alternated with 𒂊 /e/- in accordance with vowel harmony during the Old Sumerian period, while Northern Sumerian only had /i/-. Later Southern Sumerian generalized /i/- as well.
- In Southern Sumerian, the conjugation prefix expressing the passive was 𒁀 ba-, while in Northern Sumerian, it was 𒀀 a-.
- In Southern Sumerian after the Old Akkadian period, the conjugation prefix 𒀀 a-, which had originally existed in both dialects, disappears entirely apart from the variant 𒀠 al-, which only appears in subordinate clauses.
- In Southern Sumerian, the Old Sumerian phoneme ř merged with r, while in Northern Sumerian, it merged with d.

=== Old Babylonian Sumerian ===
The dominant Sumerian variety of the Old Babylonian period, in turn, reflected a different regional dialect from the standard Neo-Sumerian of the Ur III period:

- Neo-Sumerian elides the conjugation prefixes 𒉌 /i/- and 𒀀 /a/- in front of the prefixes 𒉌-/ni/-, 𒊏 -/ra/- and 𒊑 -/ri/-, while Old Babylonian Sumerian retains them.
- The original sequence 𒈬𒂊 mu-e-, consisting of the ventive conjugation prefix 𒈬 mu- and the 2nd person prefix 𒂊 -e-, is contracted into 𒈬 /muː/ in the Ur III standard, but into 𒈨 /meː/ in the most common Old Babylonian variety.
- In general, Old Babylonian Sumerian preserved many features of Northern Sumerian, in contrast to the decidedly Southern character of the Ur III standard. This is doubtlessly connected to the fact that the centre of power in Babylonia moved to the north. In particular, it uses spellings that show that its reflex of the Old Sumerian ř phoneme is /d/.

== Interference from Akkadian and other late phenomena ==
In the Old Babylonian period and after it, the Sumerian used by scribes was influenced by their mother tongue, Akkadian, and sometimes more generally by imperfect acquisition of the language. As a result, various deviations from its original structure occur in texts or copies of texts from these times. The following effects have been found in the Old Babylonian period:

- confusion of the animate and inanimate gender, resulting in use of incorrect gender pronouns;
- occasional use of the animate plural -ene with inanimates;
- occasional use of the directive case marker -/e/ with animates;
- changes in the use of the nominal case markers so as to parallel the use of Akkadian prepositions, whereas the verbal case markers remain unchanged, resulting in mismatches between nominal and verbal case;
- generalized use of terminative -/še/ to express direction, displacing locative -/a/ as the expression of illative and sublative meanings ("into" and "onto") and directive -/e/ as the expression of achieving contiguity with something;
- treatment of the prefix sequences /b/-/i/- and /n/-/i/-, which originally could mark the causee in transitive verbs, as causative markers even with intransitive verbs;
- dropping of final -/m/ in the copula -/am/ and sometimes its replacement with -/e/;
- occurrence of -/e/ as a marû 3rd person singular marker even in intransitive verbs;
- occurrence of -/n/- as a transitive subject prefix in forms with a 1st (and, rarely, also 2nd) person ergative participant;
- occurrence of pre-stem pronominal prefixes in ḫamṭu referring to an intransitive subject;
- occasional incorporation of the constituent noun of the phrasal verb into the verb stem: e.g. ki-ag̃_{2} or ki ...ki-ag̃_{2} instead of ki ...ag̃_{2} "to love";
- confusion of the locative case (-/a/) and the directive case (-/e/), as well as the various prefix-case combinations;
- occasional use of the ergative/directive ending -/e/ instead of the genitive case marker -/a(k)/.

For Middle Babylonian and later texts, additional deviations have been noted:

- loss of the contrast between the phonemes g (/g/) and g̃ (/ŋ/), with the latter merging into the former, and use of the signs for g also for words with original g̃
- omission of the ergative marker -/e/ and apparent loss of the notion of an ergative case;
- use of 𒆤 -ke_{4}, originally expressing a sequence of the genitive marker -/ak/ and the ergative marker -/e/, simply as a marker of the genitive, equivalent to -/a(k)/ alone;
- use of the ablative -/ta/ instead of the locative -/a/;
- omission of the genitive marker -/a(k)/;
- use of infrequent words, sometimes inappropriately, apparently extracted from lexical lists.
- use of Emesal forms in non-Emesal contexts: e.g. /umun/ "lord" and /gašan/ "lady" (instead of 𒂗 en and 𒎏 nin), moreover written with the innovated logograms 𒌋 and 𒃽, respectively.

== Syllabary ==
The table below shows signs used for simple syllables of the form CV or VC. As used for the Sumerian language, the cuneiform script was in principle capable of distinguishing at least 16 consonants, transliterated as

b, d, g, g̃, ḫ, k, l, m, n, p, r, ř, s, š, t, z

as well as four vowel qualities, a, e, i, u.

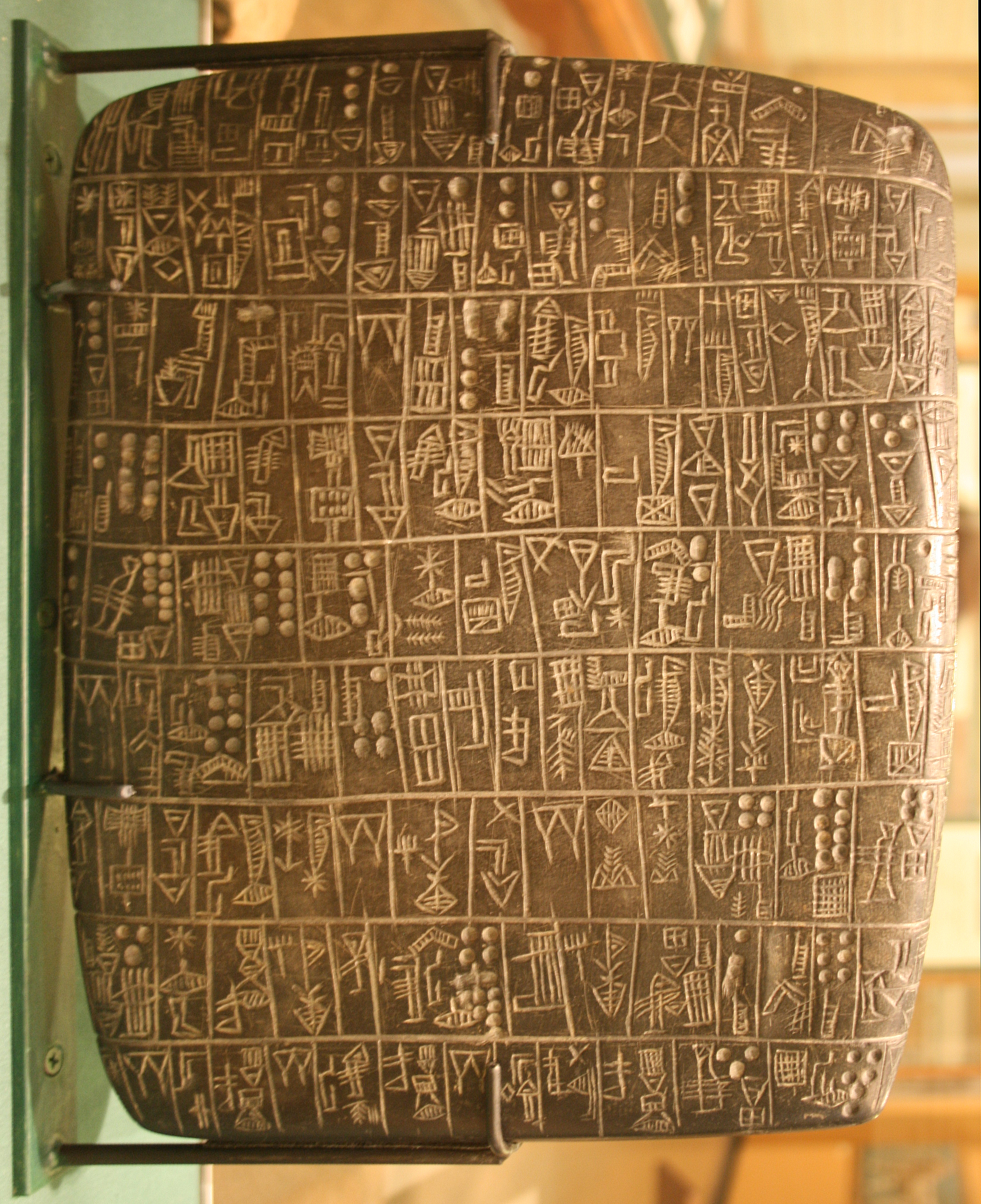
Sale of a number of fields, probably from Isin, c. 2600 BC.

Sumerian CV and VC syllabic glyphs
| | Ca | Ce | Ci | Cu | aC | eC | iC | uC | |
|---|---|---|---|---|---|---|---|---|---|
| | a 𒀀, á 𒀉 | e 𒂊, é 𒂍 | i 𒄿, í=IÁ 𒐊, ì=NI 𒉌 | u 𒌋, ú 𒌑, ù 𒅇 | a 𒀀, á 𒀉 | e 𒂊, é 𒂍 | i 𒄿, í=IÁ 𒐊, ì=NI 𒉌 | u 𒌋, ú 𒌑, ù 𒅇 | |
| b- | ba 𒁀, bá=PA 𒉺, bà=EŠ 𒌍 | be=BAD 𒁁, bé=BI 𒁉, bè=NI 𒉌 | bi 𒁉, bí=NE 𒉈, bì=PI 𒉿 | bu 𒁍, bú=KASKAL 𒆜, bù=PÙ 𒅤 | ab 𒀊, áb 𒀖 | eb=IB 𒅁, éb=TUM 𒌈 | ib 𒅁, íb=TUM 𒌈 | ub 𒌒, úb=ŠÈ 𒂠 | -b |
| d- | da 𒁕, dá=TA 𒋫 | de=DI 𒁲, dé 𒌣, dè=NE 𒉈 | di 𒁲, dí=TÍ 𒄭 dì=TI 𒋾 | du 𒁺, dú=TU 𒌅, dù=GAG 𒆕, du_{4}=TUM 𒌈 | ad 𒀜, ád 𒄉 | ed=Á 𒀉 | id=Á 𒀉, íd=A.ENGUR 𒀀𒇉 | ud 𒌓, úd=ÁŠ 𒀾 | -d |
| g- | ga 𒂵, gá 𒂷 | ge=GI 𒄀, gé=KID 𒆤, gè=DIŠ 𒁹 | gi 𒄀, gí=KID 𒆤, gì=DIŠ 𒁹, gi_{4} 𒄄, gi_{5}=KI 𒆠 | gu 𒄖, gú 𒄘, gù=KA 𒅗, gu_{4} 𒄞, gu_{5}=KU 𒆪, gu_{6}=NAG 𒅘, gu_{7} 𒅥 | ag 𒀝, ág 𒉘 | eg=IG 𒅅, ég=E 𒂊 | ig 𒅅, íg=E 𒂊 | ug 𒊌 | -g |
| ḫ- | ḫa 𒄩, ḫá=ḪI.A 𒄭𒀀, ḫà=U 𒌋, ḫa_{4}=ḪI 𒄭 | ḫe=ḪI 𒄭, ḫé=GAN 𒃶 | ḫi 𒄭, ḫí=GAN 𒃶 | ḫu 𒄷 | aḫ 𒄴, áḫ=ŠEŠ 𒋀 | eḫ=AḪ 𒄴 | iḫ=AḪ 𒄴 | uḫ=AḪ 𒄴, úḫ 𒌔 | -ḫ |
| k- | ka 𒅗, ká 𒆍, kà=GA 𒂵 | ke=KI 𒆠, ké=GI 𒄀 | ki 𒆠, kí=GI 𒄀 | ku 𒆪/𒂠, kú=GU_{7} 𒅥, kù 𒆬, ku_{4} 𒆭 | ak=AG 𒀝 | ek=IG 𒅅 | ik=IG 𒅅 | uk=UG 𒊌 | -k |
| l- | la 𒆷, lá=LAL 𒇲, là=NU 𒉡 | le=LI 𒇷, lé=NI 𒉌 | li 𒇷, lí=NI 𒉌 | lu 𒇻, lú 𒇽 | al 𒀠, ál=ALAM 𒀩 | el 𒂖, él=IL 𒅋 | il 𒅋, íl 𒅍 | ul 𒌌, úl=NU 𒉡 | -l |
| m- | ma 𒈠, má 𒈣 | me 𒈨, mé=MI 𒈪, mè 𒀞/𒅠 | mi 𒈪, mí=MUNUS 𒊩, mì=ME 𒈨 | mu 𒈬, mú=SAR 𒊬 | am 𒄠/𒂔, ám=ÁG 𒉘 | em=IM 𒅎 | im 𒅎, ím=KAŠ_{4} 𒁽 | um 𒌝, úm=UD 𒌓 | -m |
| n- | na 𒈾, ná 𒈿, nà=AG 𒀝, na_{4} ("NI.UD") 𒉌𒌓 | ne 𒉈, né=NI 𒉌 | ni 𒉌, ní=IM 𒉎 | nu 𒉡, nú=NÁ 𒈿 | an 𒀭 | en 𒂗, én 𒋙𒀭, èn=LI 𒇷 | in 𒅔, in_{4}=EN 𒂗, in_{5}=NIN 𒊩𒌆 | un 𒌦, ún=U 𒌋 | -n |
| p- | pa 𒉺, pá=BA 𒁀, pà=PAD_{3} 𒅆𒊒 | pe=PI 𒉿, pé=BI 𒁉 | pi 𒉿, pí=BI 𒁉, pì=BAD 𒁁 | pu=BU 𒁍, pú=TÚL 𒇥, pù 𒅤 | ap=AB 𒀊 | ep=IB 𒅁, ép=TUM 𒌈 | ip=IB 𒅁, íp=TUM 𒌈 | up=UB 𒌒, úp=ŠÈ 𒂠 | -p |
| r- | ra 𒊏, rá=DU 𒁺 | re=RI 𒊑, ré=URU 𒌷, rè=LAGAB 𒆸 | ri 𒊑, rí=URU 𒌷 rì=LAGAB 𒆸 | ru 𒊒, rú=GAG 𒆕, rù=AŠ 𒀸 | ar 𒅈, ár=UB 𒌒 | er=IR 𒅕 | ir 𒅕, ír=A.IGI 𒀀𒅆 | ur 𒌨, úr 𒌫 | -r |
| s- | sa 𒊓, sá=DI 𒁲, sà=ZA 𒍝, sa_{4} ("ḪU.NÁ") 𒄷𒈾 | se=SI 𒋛, sé=ZI 𒍣 | si 𒋛, sí=ZI 𒍣 | su 𒋢, sú=ZU 𒍪, sù=SUD 𒋤, su_{4} 𒋜 | as=AZ 𒊍 | es=GIŠ 𒄑, és=EŠ 𒂠 | is=GIŠ 𒄑, ís=EŠ 𒂠 | us=UZ 𒊻, ús=UŠ 𒍑, us₅ 𒇇 | -s |
| š- | ša 𒊭, šá=NÍG 𒐼, šà 𒊮 | še 𒊺, šé, šè 𒂠 | ši=IGI 𒅆, ší=SI 𒋛 | šu 𒋗, šú 𒋙, šù=ŠÈ 𒂠, šu_{4}=U 𒌋 | aš 𒀸, áš 𒀾 | eš 𒌍/𒐁, éš=ŠÈ 𒂠 | iš 𒅖, íš=KASKAL 𒆜 | uš 𒍑, úš=BAD 𒁁 | -š |
| t- | ta 𒋫, tá=DA 𒁕 | te 𒋼, té=TÍ 𒊹 | ti 𒋾, tí 𒊹, tì=DIM 𒁴, ti_{4}=DI 𒁲 | tu 𒌅, tú=UD 𒌓, tù=DU 𒁺 | at=AD 𒀜, át=GÍR gunû 𒄉 | et=Á 𒀉 | it=Á 𒀉 | ut=UD 𒌓, út=ÁŠ 𒀾 | -t |
| z- | za 𒍝, zá=NA_{4} 𒉌𒌓 | ze=ZI 𒍣, zé=ZÍ 𒍢 | zi 𒍣, zí 𒍢, zì 𒍥 | zu 𒍪, zú=KA 𒅗 | az 𒊍 | ez=GIŠ 𒄑, éz=EŠ 𒂠 | iz= GIŠ 𒄑, íz=IŠ 𒅖 | uz=ŠE&HU 𒊻 úz=UŠ 𒍑, ùz 𒍚 | -z |
| g̃- | g̃á=GÁ 𒂷 | g̃e_{26}=GÁ 𒂷 | g̃i_{6}=MI 𒈪 | g̃u_{10}=MU 𒈬 | ág̃=ÁG 𒉘 | èg̃=ÁG 𒉘 | ìg̃=ÁG 𒉘 | ùg̃=UN 𒌦 | -g̃ |
| ř- | řá=DU 𒁺 | ře_{6}=DU 𒁺 | | | | | | | -ř |

== Sample text ==
=== Inscription by Entemena of Lagaš ===
This text was inscribed on a small clay cone c. 2400 BC. It recounts the beginning of a war between the city-states of Lagaš and Umma during the Early Dynastic III period, one of the earliest border conflicts recorded. (RIME 1.09.05.01)

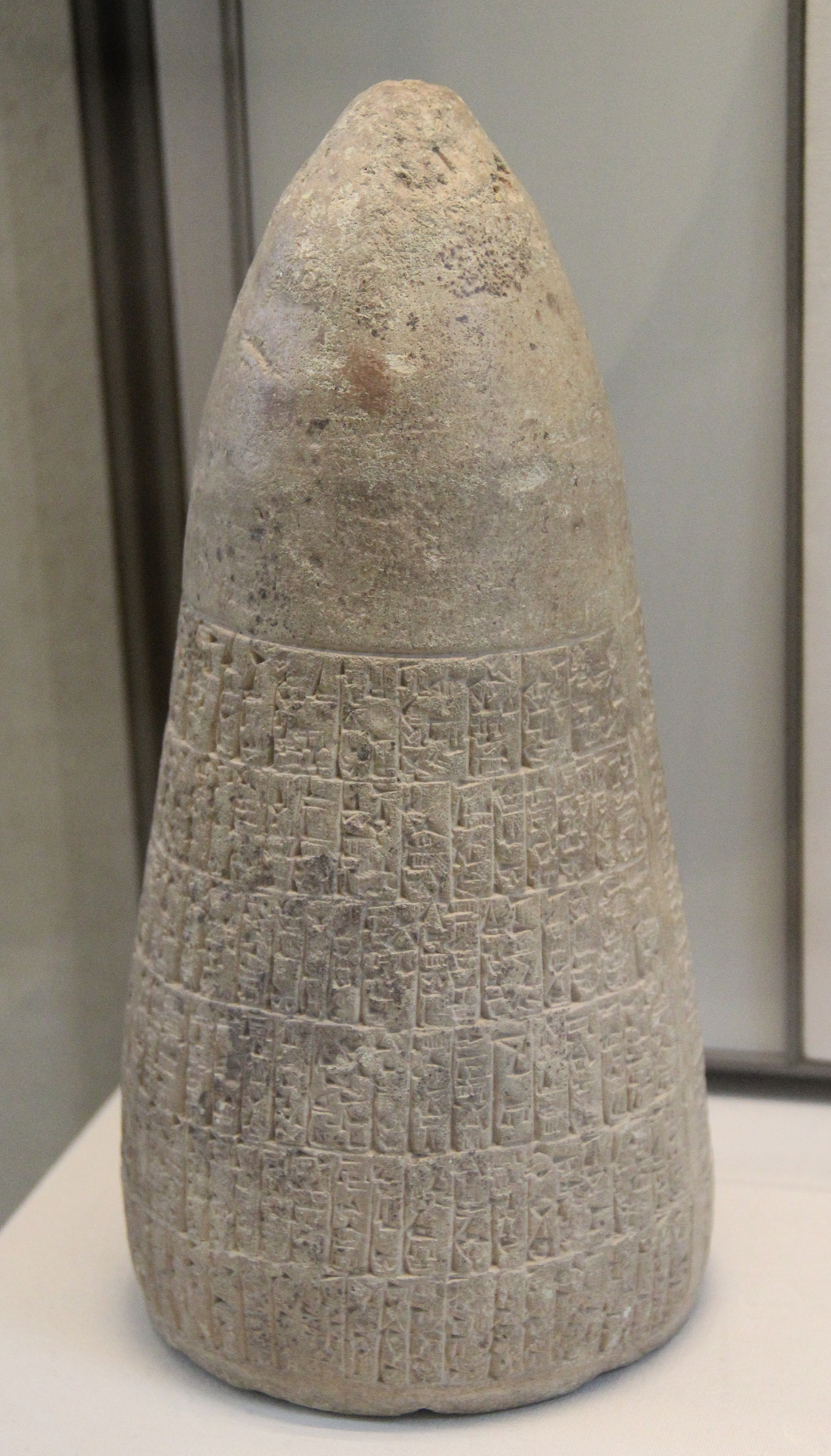
Cone of Enmetena, king of Lagash, Room 236 Reference AO 3004, Louvre Museum.

𒀭𒂗𒆤 𒈗 𒆳𒆳𒊏 𒀊𒁀 𒀭𒀭𒌷𒉈𒆤 𒅗 𒄀𒈾𒉌𒋫 𒀭𒊩𒌆𒄈𒋢 𒀭𒇋𒁉 𒆠 𒂊𒉈𒋩
^{d}en-lil_{2} lugal kur-kur-ra ab-ba dig̃ir-dig̃ir-re_{2}-ne-ke_{4} inim gi-na-ni-ta ^{d}nin-g̃ir_{2}-su ^{d}šara_{2}-bi ki e-ne-sur
"Enlil, king of all the lands, father of all the gods, by his firm command, fixed the border between Ningirsu and Šara."

𒈨𒁲 𒈗 𒆧𒆠𒆤 𒅗 𒀭𒅗𒁲𒈾𒋫 𒂠 𒃷 𒁉𒊏 𒆠𒁀 𒈾 𒉈𒆕
me-silim lugal kiš^{ki}-ke_{4} inim ^{d}ištaran-na-ta eš_{2} gana_{2} be_{2}-ra ki-ba na bi_{2}-řu_{2}
"Mesilim, king of Kiš, at the command of Ištaran, measured the field and set up a stele there."

𒍑 𒉺𒋼𒋛 𒄑𒆵𒆠𒆤 𒉆 𒅗𒈠 𒋛𒀀𒋛𒀀𒂠 𒂊𒀝
uš ensi_{2} umma^{ki}-ke_{4} nam inim-ma dirig-dirig-še_{3} e-ak
"Ush, ruler of Umma, acted unspeakably."

𒈾𒆕𒀀𒁉 𒉌𒉻 𒂔 𒉢𒁓𒆷𒆠𒂠 𒉌𒁺
na-ru_{2}-a-bi i_{3}-pad edin lagaš^{ki}-še_{3} i_{3}-g̃en
"He ripped out that stele and marched toward the plain of Lagaš."

𒀭𒊩𒌆𒄈𒋢 𒌨𒊕 𒀭𒂗𒆤𒇲𒆤 𒅗 𒋛𒁲𒉌𒋫 𒄑𒆵𒆠𒁕 𒁮𒄩𒊏 𒂊𒁕𒀝
^{d}nin-g̃ir_{2}-su ur-sag ^{d}en-lil_{2}-la_{2}-ke_{4} inim si-sa_{2}-ni-ta umma^{ki}-da dam-ḫa-ra e-da-ak
"Ningirsu, warrior of Enlil, at his just command, made war with Umma."

𒅗 𒀭𒂗𒆤𒇲𒋫 𒊓 𒌋 𒃲 𒉈𒌋 𒅖𒇯𒋺𒁉 𒂔𒈾 𒆠 𒁀𒉌𒍑𒍑
inim ^{d}en-lil_{2}-la_{2}-ta sa šu_{4} gal bi_{2}-šu_{4} SAḪAR.DU_{6}.TAKA_{4}-bi eden-na ki ba-ni-us_{2}-us_{2}
"At Enlil's command, he threw his great battle net over it and heaped up burial mounds for it on the plain."

𒂍𒀭𒈾𒁺 𒉺𒋼𒋛 𒉢𒁓𒆷𒆠 𒉺𒄑𒉋𒂵 𒂗𒋼𒈨𒈾 𒉺𒋼𒋛 𒉢𒁓𒆷𒆠𒅗𒆤
e_{2}-an-na-tum_{2} ensi_{2} lagaš^{ki} pa-bil_{3}-ga en-mete-na ensi_{2} lagaš^{ki}-ka-ke_{4}
"Eannatum, ruler of Lagash, uncle of Entemena, ruler of Lagaš"

𒂗𒀉𒆗𒇷 𒉺𒋼𒋛 𒄑𒆵𒆠𒁕 𒆠 𒂊𒁕𒋩
en-a_{2}-kal-le ensi_{2} umma^{ki}-da ki e-da-sur
"fixed the border with Enakale, ruler of Umma"

== See also ==
- List of languages by first written accounts
- Pennsylvania Sumerian Dictionary
- Sumerian literature
- Descent of Inanna into the Underworld

== Bibliography ==
- Attinger, Pascal (1993). Eléments de linguistique sumérienne: La construction de du_{11}/e/di. Göttingen: Vandenhoeck&Ruprecht. ISBN 3-7278-0869-1. Online
- Attinger, Pascal (2009). Tableau grammatical du sumérien (problèmes choisis). Online publication.
- Bartelmus, Alexa (2016). Fragmente einer großen Sprache. Sumerisch im Kontext der Schreiberausbildung des kassitenzeitlichen Babylonien. Berlin: Walter de Gruyter.
- Civil, Miquel (2020). Esbós de gramàtica sumèria. An outline of Sumerian grammar. A cura de Lluís Feliu Institut del Pròxim Orient Antic.
- Delitzsch, Friedrich (1914). Grundzüge der sumerischen Grammatik. J. C. Hinrichs. OCLC 923551546.
- Dewart, Leslie (1989). Evolution and Consciousness: The Role of Speech in the Origin and Development of Human Nature. Toronto: University of Toronto Press. ISBN 0-8020-2690-7.
- Diakonoff, I. M. (1976). "Ancient Writing and Ancient Written Language: Pitfalls and Peculiarities in the Study of Sumerian" (PDF). Assyriological Studies. 20 (Sumerological Studies in Honor of Thorkild Jakobsen): 99–121. Archived (PDF) from the original on 2019-08-03.
- Edzard, Dietz Otto (2003). Sumerian Grammar. Leiden: Brill. ISBN 90-04-12608-2. (grammar treatment for the advanced student)
- Falkenstein, Adam (1949). Grammatik der Sprache Gudeas von Lagas I: Schrift- und Formenlehre. Analecta orientalia 28. Rome: Pontifical Biblical Institute.
- Falkenstein, Adam (1950). Grammatik der Sprache Gudeas von Lagas II: Syntax. Analecta orientalia 29. Rome: Pontifical Biblical Institute.
- George, Andrew (2007). "Babylonian and Assyrian: A History of Akkadian". In: Postgate, J. N., (ed.), Languages of Iraq, Ancient and Modern. London: British School of Archaeology in Iraq, p. 37. Online Archived 2020-07-31 at the Wayback Machine
- Halloran, John (11 August 1999). "Sumerian Lexicon" (PDF). Sumerian Language Page. Archived (PDF) from the original on 26 January 2021.
- Halloran, John Alan (2006). Sumerian Lexicon: A Dictionary Guide to the Ancient Sumerian Language. Logogram Pub. ISBN 978-0978-64291-4.
- Hayes, John (1990; 2nd revised ed. 2000; 3rd revised ed. 2018). A Manual of Sumerian: Grammar and Texts. UNDENA, Malibu CA. ISBN 978-0-9798937-4-2. (primer for the beginning student)
- Hayes, John (1997), Sumerian. Languages of the World/Materials #68, LincomEuropa, Munich. ISBN 3-929075-39-3. (41 pp. précis of the grammar)
- Jagersma, B. (2009). A Descriptive Grammar of Sumerian, Universitet Leiden, The Netherlands.
- Jestin, J. (1951). Abrégé de Grammaire Sumérienne, Geuthner, Paris. ISBN 2-7053-1743-0. (118pp overview and sketch, in French)
- Keetman, Jan (2017). Die Markierung des Passivs im Sumerischen. Wiener Zeitschrift fü die Kunde des Morgenlandes 107.
- Kogan, L., Krebernik, M. (2021). A history of the Akkadian lexicon. In: J.-P. Vita (ed.), History of the Akkadian Language. Vol. I. Leiden–Boston, 366–476. P. 418–419.
- Kramer, Samuel Noah (1963). The Sumerians.
- Langdon, Stephen Herbert (1911). A Sumerian Grammar and Chrestomathy, with a Vocabulary of the Principal Roots in Sumerian, and List of the Most Important Syllabic and Vowel Transcriptions, by Stephen Langdon ... P. Geuthner. OCLC 251014503.
- Michalowski, Piotr (1980). "Sumerian as an Ergative Language". Journal of Cuneiform Studies. 32 (2): 86–103. doi:10.2307/1359671. JSTOR 1359671. S2CID 164022054.
- Michalowski, Piotr (2004). "Sumerian", The Cambridge Encyclopedia of the World's Ancient Languages pp 19–59, ed. Roger Woodward. Cambridge: Cambridge University Press, ISBN 978-05-2156-256-0.
- Michalowski, Piotr (2020). "Sumerian". In: Rebecca Hasselbach-Andee (ed.). A Companion to Ancient Near Eastern Languages. Wiley-Blackwell.
- Pinches, Theophilus G. "Further Light upon the Sumerian Language.", Journal of the Royal Asiatic Society of Great Britain and Ireland, 1914, pp. 436–40
- Prince, John D. (1908). Materials for a Sumerian lexicon with a grammatical introduction. Assyriologische Bibliothek, 19. Hinrichs. OCLC 474982763.
- Prince, J. Dynely (October 1914). "Delitzsch's Sumerian Grammar". American Journal of Semitic Languages and Literatures. 31 (1). U of Chicago: 67–78. doi:10.1086/369755. ISSN 1062-0516. S2CID 170226826.
- Rubio, Gonzalo (2007). "Sumerian Morphology". In Morphologies of Asia and Africa, vol. 2, pp. 1327–1379. Edited by Alan S. Kaye. Eisenbrauns, Winona Lake, IN, ISBN 1-57506-109-0.
- Rubio, Gonzalo (2009). "Sumerian Literature". In Carl S. Ehrlich (ed.). From an antique land : an introduction to ancient Near Eastern literature. Rowman & Littlefield.
- Sallaberger, Walther (2023a). Sumerisch: Eine Einführung in Sprache, Schrift und Texte. Mit 50 Texten von Gudea von Lagaš bis Lipit-Eštar von Isin. Band 1. Die sumerische Sprache. Gladbeck: PeWe-Verlag. Online
- Colonna d’Istria, Laurent (2023). Sumerisch: Eine Einführung in Sprache, Schrift und Texte II. Sumerische Texte in Keilschrift, Zeichenlisten. Gladbeck: PeWe-Verlag. Online
- Sallaberger, Walther (2023b). Sumerisch: Eine Einführung in Sprache, Schrift und Texte. Band 3: Die Texte in Bearbeitung, Glossar. Gladbeck: PeWe-Verlag. Online
- Thomsen, Marie-Louise (2001) [1984]. The Sumerian Language: An Introduction to Its History and Grammatical Structure. Copenhagen: Akademisk Forlag. ISBN 87-500-3654-8. (Well-organized with over 800 translated text excerpts.)
- Viano, Maurizio (2016). The Reception of Sumerian Literature in the Western Periphery. Venezia: Edizioni Ca’ Foscari.
- Volk, Konrad (1997). A Sumerian Reader. Rome: Pontificio Istituto Biblico. ISBN 88-7653-610-8. (collection of Sumerian texts, some transcribed, none translated)
- Woods, Cristopher (2008). The Grammar of Perspective: The Sumerian Conjugation Prefixes as a System of Voice. Leiden: Brill.
- Zamudio, Rafael Jiménez (2017). Nueva gramática de Sumerio. Madrid: Universidad de Alcalá.
- Zólyomi, Gábor (2017). An Introduction to the Grammar of Sumerian. Open Access textbook, Budapest. Link 1 Link 2
