= Kassites =

People of the ancient Near East

Akkadian: 𒂵𒅆𒄿 (ka₃-ši-i, kašši)
- Kassites (Iraq) Map of Iraq showing important sites that were occupied by the Kassite dynasty of Babylonia (clickable map)

Regions with significant populations
- Karduniash, Cossaea, Bablyonia

Languages
- Kassite, most writing in Akkadian

Religion
- Kassite religion, later subsumed into Mesopotamian religion

Related ethnic groups
- Elamites

The Kassites (/ˈkæsaɪts/; Neo-Assyrian: 𒂵𒅆𒄿, ka₃-ši-i, kašši) were a people of the ancient Near East originating from the Zagros Mountains. They controlled Babylonia from c. 1531 to c. 1155 BC (short chronology) under the Kassite Dynasty following the collapse of the Old Babylonian Empire.

The Kassites gained control of Babylonia after the Hittite sack of Babylon in 1531 BC; their first dynastic capital is thought to have been Babylon. They later established the city of Dur-Kurigalzu as their new capital. By the time of Babylon's fall, the Kassites had already been part of the region for a century and a half, acting sometimes as allies of Babylon and other times as adversaries. There are records of Kassite and Babylonian interactions, in the context of military employment, during the reigns of Babylonian kings Samsu-iluna (1686 to 1648 BC), Abī-ešuh, and Ammī-ditāna. The Elamites of the Shutrukid dynasty conquered Babylonia in the 12th century BC, ending the Kassite Dynasty.

The Kassite language is classified as a language isolate.

== Etymology ==
The Neo-Assyrian (Akkadian) exonym 𒂵𒅆𒄿 (ka₃-ši-i, kašši) is a phonetic rendering of the Kassite *g/kalž- (𒃲𒍪 gal-zu or 𒆗𒍪 kal-zu) which appears as galzu in personal names from the Old Babylonian period (ca. 2000–1500 BC) onwards. Middle Babylonian documents from Nuzi have the form Ku-uš-šu (-hé), i.e., with the Hurrian adjectival ending -ḫḫe.

The Akkadian Kaššû can be inflected for gender (m.: kaššû / f.: kaššītu) and often for case (kaššû, kaššî, kaššâ). The term can appear independently as a proper noun, “a Kassite”, where it is often marked as a personal name (^{I}Kaššû), but more often the word appears as a gentilic adjective, e.g., “Šimdi-Saḫ, the Kassite” (^{I}Šim-di-Saḫ kaš-šu-ú).

Beekes suggests that the demonym for the Kassites may be responsible for the etymology of the mineral Cassiterite. They may have traded tin with the ancient Greeks via the island of κασσίτερα (Kassitera) mentioned by Dionysius in the Bassarika and quoted by Stephanos of Byzantium.

== History ==
The earliest attestation of a person with a Kassite name in Babylonia is from Rīm-Sīn I’s 53rd year (1770 BCE).

Documentation of the Kassite period depends heavily on the scattered and disarticulated tablets from Nippur, where thousands of tablets and fragments have been excavated. They include administrative and legal texts, letters, seal inscriptions, private votive inscriptions, and even a literary text (usually identified as a fragment of a historical epic). Many of those tablets have not yet been published, including hundreds held in the Ottoman Museum in Istanbul.

About 100 Kassite tablets were found at Dur-Kurigalzu. A few inscribed building materials of Kurigalzu I were found at Kish. Several tablets dated to the reign of Agum III were found at the Dilmun site of Qal'at al-Bahrain. In total, about 12,000 Kassite period documents have been recovered, of which only around 10% have been published. There are also a number of building inscriptions, all but one written in Sumerian unlike the Akkadian typically used by the Kassites. A number of seals have also been found. Kudurrus, stone stele used to record land grants and related documents, provide another source for Kassite history. This practice continued for several centuries after the end of the Kassite Dynasty. Often situated on the surface, many were found early and made their way to museums around the world.

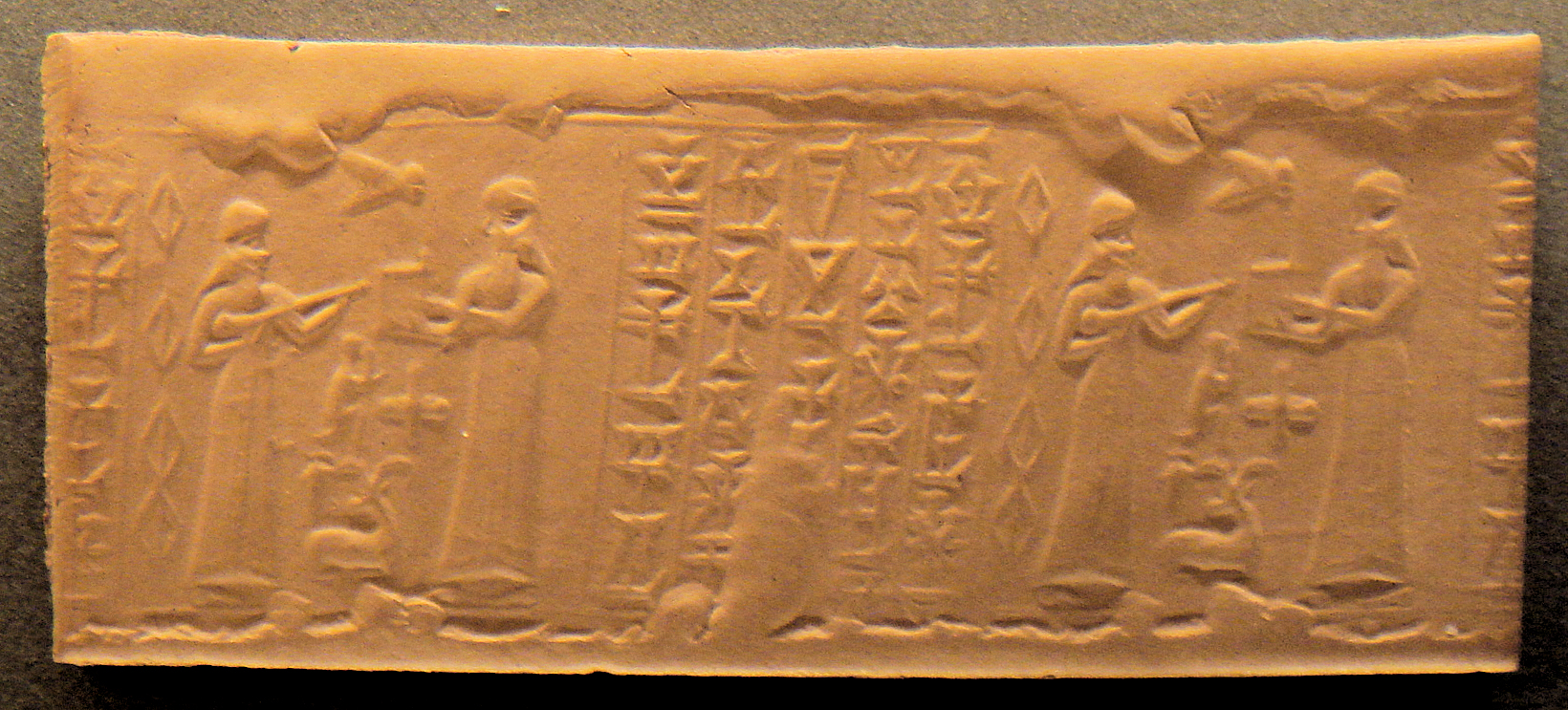
Cylinder seal of Kassite king Kurigalzu II (c. 1332–1308 BC). Louvre Museum AOD 105

The ancient city of Nippur was a major focus for the Kassites. Early on, refurbishments were conducted of the various religious and administrative buildings, the first of these datable to Kurigalzu I. Major construction occurred under Kadashman-Enlil, Kudur-Enlil, and Shagarakti-Shuriash, with lesser levels of repair work under Adad-shuma-usur and Meli-Shipak. Other important centers during the Kassite period were Larsa, Sippar and Susa. The Kassites were very active at Ur. At the site of Isin, which had been abandoned after the time of Samsu-iluna, major rebuilding work occurred on the religious district including the temple of Gula. The work at Isin was initiated by Kurigalzu I and continued by Kadashman-Enlil I, and after a lapse, by Adad-shuma-usur and Meli-Shipak II. After the Kassite dynasty was overthrown in 1155 BC, the system of provincial administration continued and the country remained united under the succeeding rule, the Second Dynasty of Isin.

=== Origins ===
The origin of the Kassites is uncertain, though a number of theories have been advanced. Several suspected Kassite names are recorded in economic documents from the Ur III period (c. 2112–2004 BC) in southern Babylon, but their origin is ambiguous. According to a number of historians today, their original homeland was located in the Zagros Mountains. One theory suggests that the Kassites were originally a Caucasian people akin to the Hurrians, with an Indo-European ruling element. Another theory suggests that the Kassites were perhaps an Indo-European people who originated in the region of the Caspian sea, but this theory is disputed. Kassites were first reported in Babylonia in the 18th century BC, especially around the area of Sippar. The 9th year name of king Samsu-iluna (c. 1749–1712 BC) of Babylon, the son of Hammurabi mentions them ie. ("Year in which Samsu-iluna the king (defeated) the totality of the strength of the army / the troops of the Kassites").

=== Middle Bronze Age ===
As the Babylonian empire weakened in the following years the Kassites became a part of the landscape, even at times supplying troops for Babylon. The Babylonians divided those into kingdom resident Kassites (referred to as such) and Kassites from peripheral areas termed Samḫarû and Bimatü. It is known that a contingent of Bimatü were stationed at Dūr-Abī-ešuḫ. The idol of the god Marduk had been carried off from Babylon, possibly by the Hittites, but the Kassite rulers regained possession, returned Marduk to Babylon, and made him the equal of the Kassite Shuqamuna. Babylon under Kassite rulers, who renamed the city Karanduniash, re-emerged as a political and military power in Mesopotamia.

=== Late Bronze Age ===
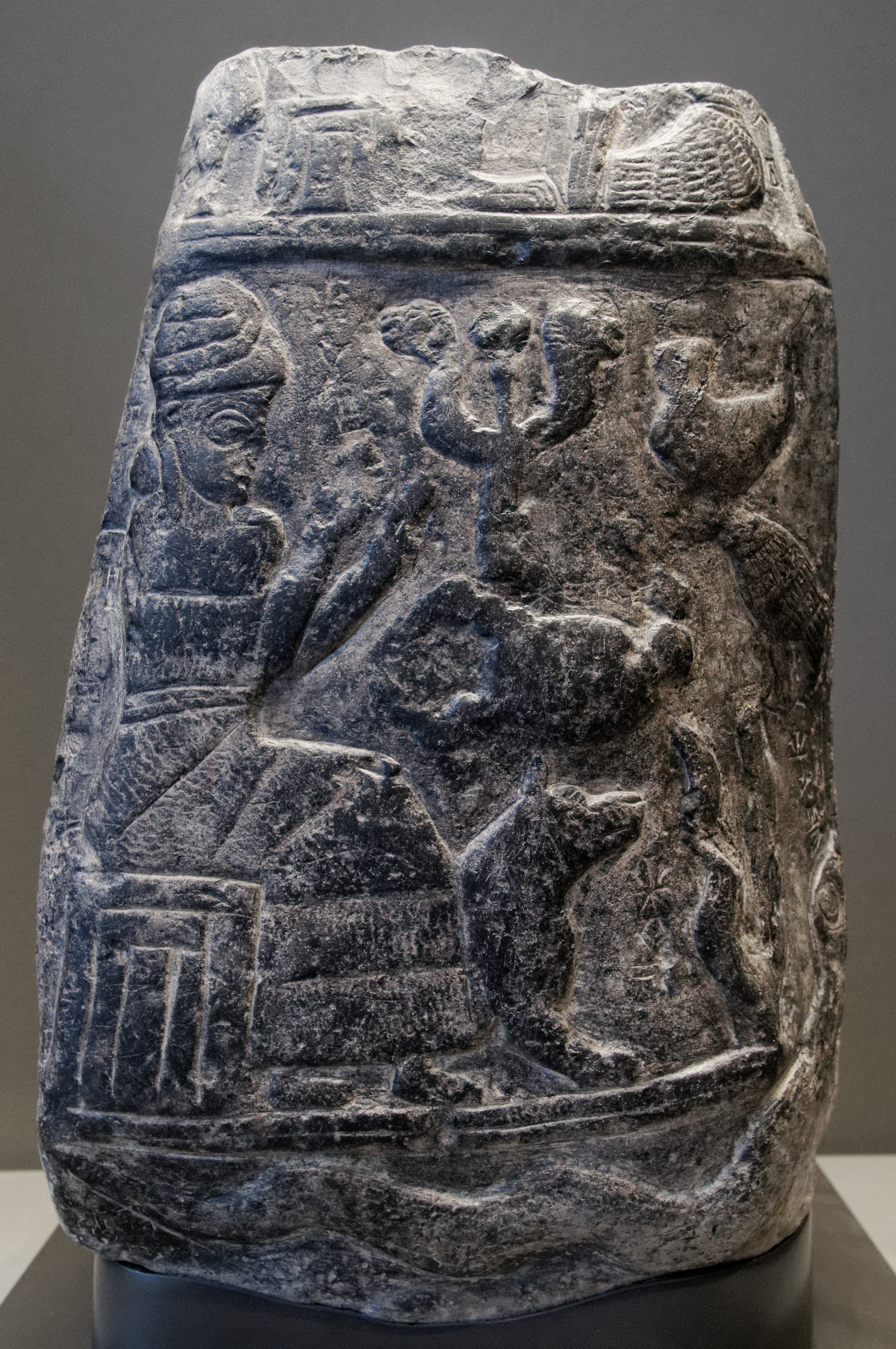
Kassite Kudurru stele of Kassite king Marduk-apla-iddina I. Louvre Museum.

The fall of the First Sealand dynasty in 1460 BC created a power vacuum which the Kassites filled. After the destruction of the Mitanni by the Hittites in the early 14th century BC, Assyria rose in power creating a three-way power structure in the region between the Kassites, Hittites, and Assyrians, with Elam exerting influence from the east and Egypt from the south. A number of the Amarna Letters are correspondence between the respective rulers (including 14 between the Pharaoh and the Kassite ruler). An international system came into place between these parties connected by widespread trade, treaties, and intermarriage between the ruling classes (especially between the Kassites and Elamites). A typical treaties include the Egyptian–Hittite peace treaty (c.1259 BC) and the treaty between the Kassite ruler Karaindash and the Assyrian ruler Ashur-bel-nisheshu (c. 1410 BC).

At the peak of their power the Kassites, under Kurigalzu I in the mid 14th century BC, conquered Elam and sacked the capital of Susa. That ruler initiated significant building efforts in Ur and other southern Mesopotamia cities. The most notable of these efforts was the construction of a new city, Dur-Kurigalzu. It contained a number of palaces and also temples to many Babylonia gods including Enlil, Ninlil, and Ninurta. The Kassites also extended their power into the Persian Gulf, including at Qal'at al-Bahrain. Being in close proximity the Assyrians and Kassites often came into political and military conflict over the next few centuries. For a time in the early reign of Tukulti-Ninurta I, Assyria gained ascendancy, until the Elamites under Kidin-Hutran III intervened. This period is marked by a building hiatus at Babylon, similar to the one after the fall of the First Babylonian dynasty.

=== Iron Age ===
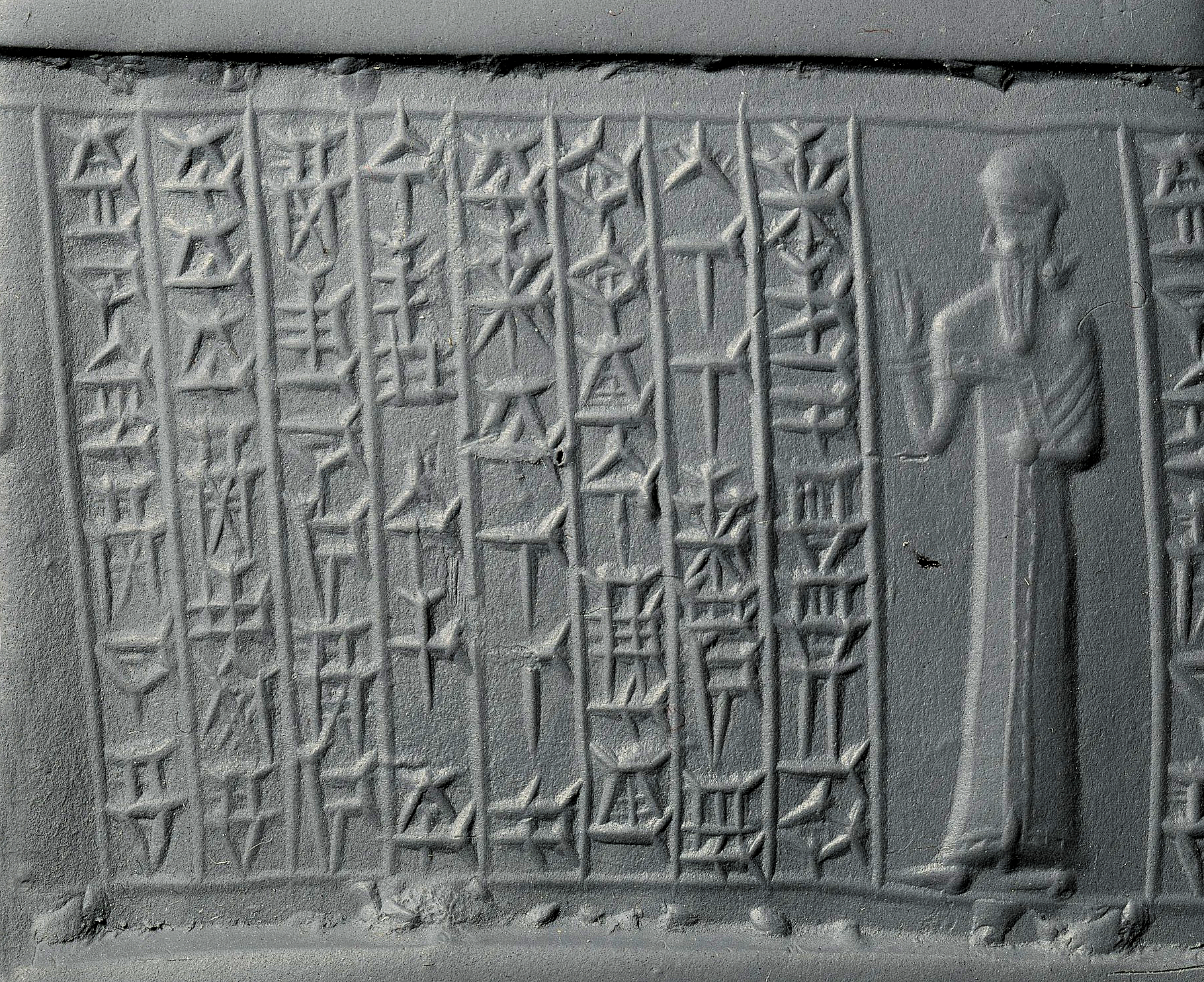
Kassite cylinder seal, c. 16th–12th century BC.

The Elamites of the Shutrukid dynasty conquered Babylonia, carrying away the Statue of Marduk, in the 12th century BC, thus ending the Kassite state. According to the Assyrian Synchronistic Chronicle, which is not considered reliable, the last Kassite king, Enlil-nadin-ahi, was taken to Susa and imprisoned there in 1155 BC, where he also died.

The annals of the Assyrian king Sennacherib detail that on his second, eastern, campaign of 702 BC he campaigned against the land of the Kassites, that being along the Diyala River between the Jebel Hamrin and the Darband-i-Khan. The Kassites took refuge in the mountains but were brought down and resettled, in standard Assyrian practice, in Hardispi and Bit Kubatti, which were made part of the Arrapha district.

=== Achaemenid through Hellenistic period ===
The history of the Kassites/Cossaei after 600 BC is reconstructed principally from sources written in Greek or Latin; they had a reputation for brigandage, preying on travelers passing through the mountains and exacting tribute for passage even from Persian rulers. They did not submit to the Achaemenids, but may have sent soldiers to fight with the forces of Darius III against Alexander the Great near Arbela in 331 BC. They were the object of the last winter campaign of Alexander in 324/323 BC, and some of them were included in a military contingent of Persians and Tapurians brought to Babylon by Peucestas. Later Antigonus refused to pay the Cossaei for safe passage through the mountains, and his army suffered heavy casualties on a march to Ecbatana. According to classical accounts, the Cossaei were expert bowmen, lived in caves, and ate a strange diet (acorns, mushrooms, and smoked flesh of wild animals); their mountainous land was small and barren, though it had a relatively good supply of timber.

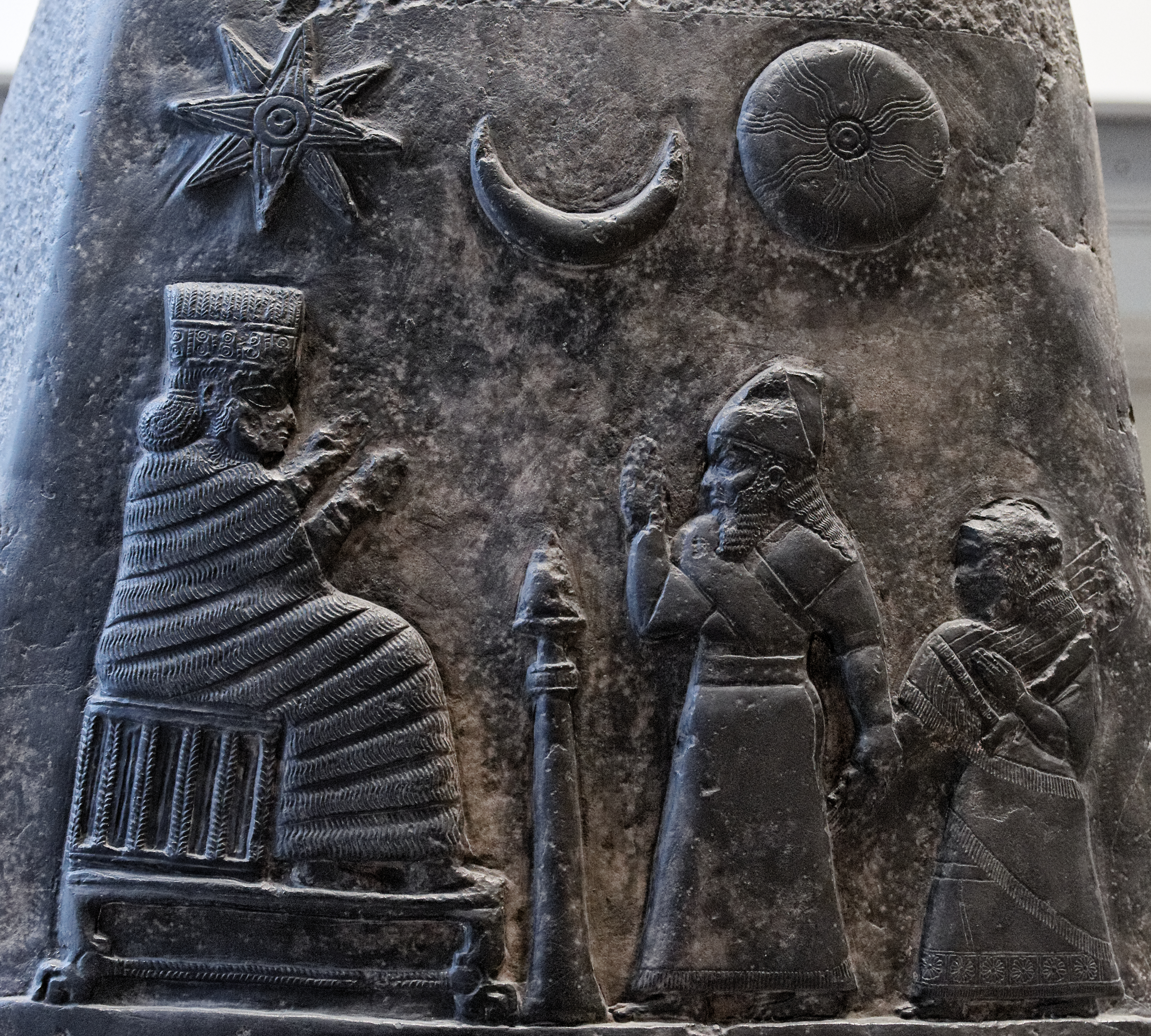
Kassite king Meli-Shipak II on a kudurru land grant presenting his daughter Ḫunnubat-Nanaya to the goddess Nanaya (pictured enthroned). The eight-pointed star seen above was Inanna-Ishtar's most common symbol. Here it is shown alongside the solar disk of her brother Shamash (Sumerian Utu) and the crescent moon of her father Sin (Sumerian Nanna) on a boundary stone of Meli-Shipak II, dating to the twelfth century BC. (Note: Land grant to Ḫunnubat-Nanaya kudurru, Sb 23, published as MDP X 87, found with Sb 22 during the French excavations at Susa.)

The Κοσσαῖοι (Kassaioi) appear on Ptolemy's 5th map of Asia in the Geography.

== Kassite language ==
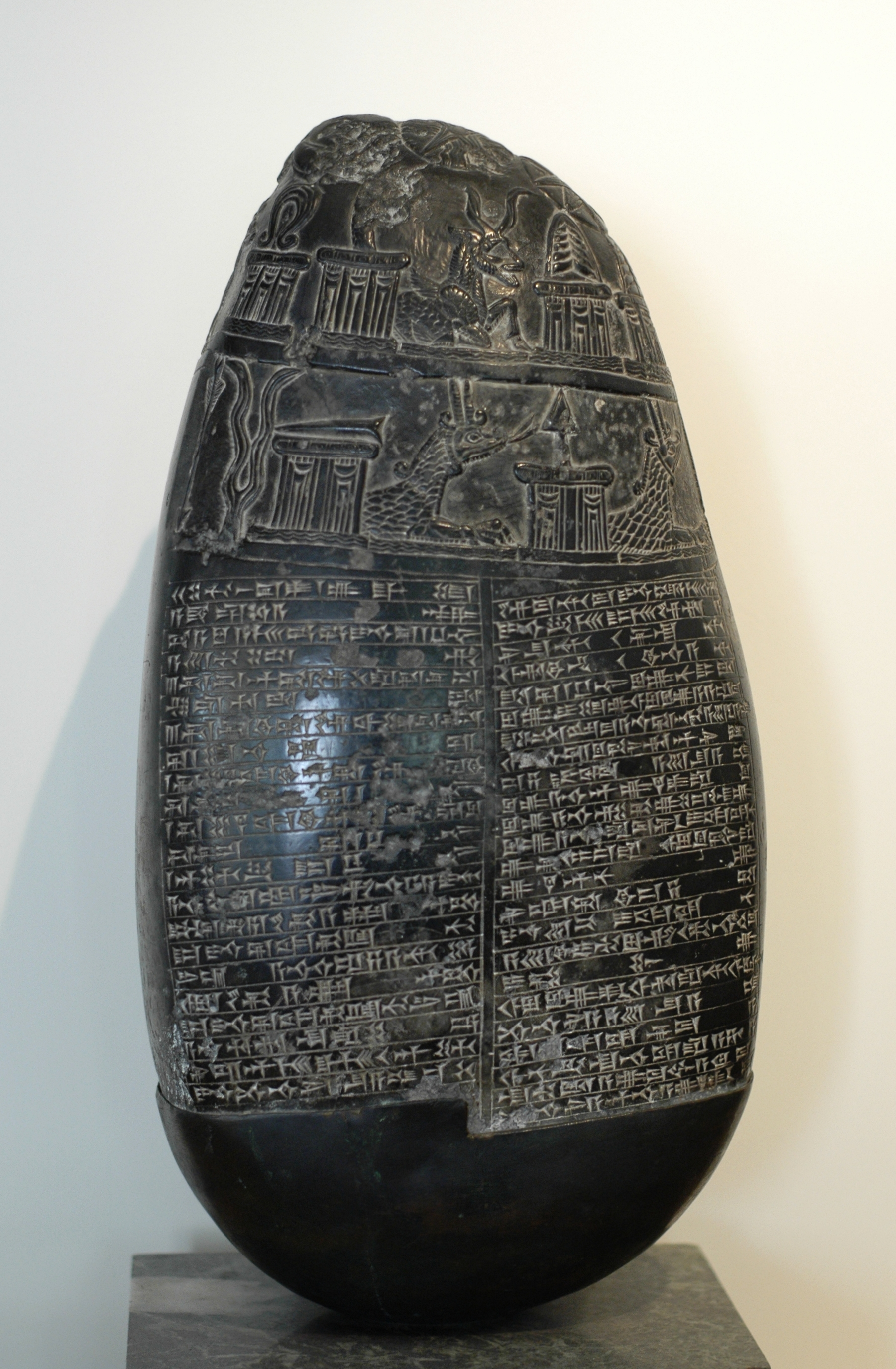
Babylonian Kudurru stele of the late Kassite period, in the reign of Kassite king Marduk-nadin-akhi (c. 1099–1082 BC). Found near Baghdad by the French botanist André Michaux (Cabinet des Médailles, Paris)

The Kassite language has not been classified. The few extant sources consist of personal names, a few fragmented documents, and some technical terms related to horses and chariotry. What is known is that their language was related to neither the Indo-European language group, nor to Semitic or other Afro-Asiatic languages. It is most likely to have been a language isolate, although some linguists have proposed a link to the Hurro-Urartian languages of the Armenian highlands and Upper Mesopotamia.

It has been suggested that several Kassite leaders bore Indo-European names, and they might have had an Indo-European elite similar to the Mitanni. Over the centuries, however, the Kassites were absorbed into the Babylonian population. Eight among the last kings of the Kassite dynasty have Akkadian names. It has also been suggested that the first element in Kudur-Enlil's name is derived from Elamite but that is disputed.

== Society ==
The Kassites might have been at least partially nomadic, and their arrival coincided with the introduction of the horse-drawn chariot. Evidence suggests that the Kassite kingdom of Babylon was ruled by kings through a bureaucratic structure supported by a chariot-warrior aristocracy.

== Religion ==
The Kassite religion is poorly understood, though the names of some Kassite deities are known. The chief gods, titular gods of the kings, were Shuqamuna and Shumaliya, which are distinct from Sumerian, Semitic and Indo-European gods. After Babylon came within the Kassite sphere of control, its city-god Marduk was absorbed into the Kassite pantheon.

== Material culture ==
=== Ceramics ===
The Kassites produced a substantial amount of pottery. It is found in many Mesopotamia cities including Eridu and Tell Khaiber. Archaeologists divide it into three periods, Early Kassite (before c. 1415 BC), Middle Kassite (c. 1415–1225 BC), and Late Kassite (c. 1225–1155 BC). Many small pottery kilns, generally no bigger than 2 meters in diameter with domed tops, were found in the Babylonian city of Dilbat. Goblets and wavy sided bowls are commonly found in Kassite pottery deposits. Other ceramic goods, such as traps for small animals and vessels commonly thought to be fruit stands were found also. Kassite pottery deposits have been found as far away as Al Khor Island in the Persian Gulf area.

=== Glass works ===
Remnants of two Kassite glass beakers were found during the 1964 excavation in a (c. 800 BC) destruction layer of Hasanlu, in northwest Iran. The mosaic glass beakers are thought to have been heirlooms, possibly for ritual use the find spot being a temple. The panes of glass used to create these images were very brightly colored, and closer analysis has revealed that they were bright green, blue, white, and red-orange. A Kassite text found at Dur-Kurigalzu mentions glass given to artisans for palace decoration and similar glass was found there. Other similar glass dated 1500 BC was found at Tell al-Rimah.

=== Seal impressions ===
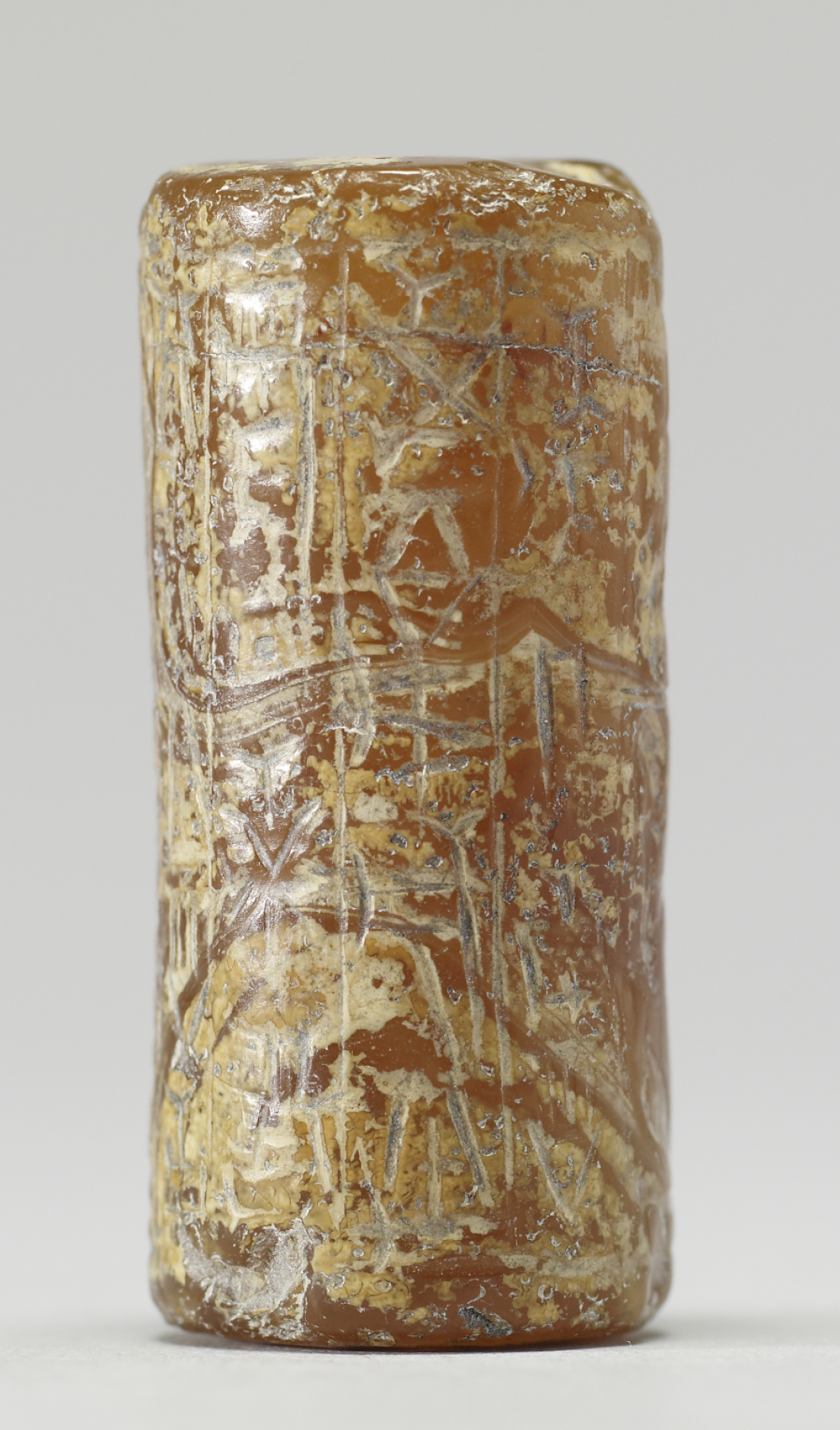
Kassite cylinder seal

Seals were used widely across the Near Eastern kingdoms during the Kassite rule. They were used to mark official items and ownership. The images created by these seals were unique to each seal, but many shared the same subject matter. Bearded men, religious symbols, horned quadrupeds, and fauna are often shown in these images. The seals were generally made of stone, glass, or clay. The images were made by stamping or rolling the seals into wet clay.

== Karduniaš ==
Babylonia under the Kassite Dynasty.

Karduniaš (also Kurduniash, Karduniash or Karaduniše) is a Kassite term used for the kingdom centered on Babylonia and founded by the Kassite dynasty. It is used in the 1350-1335 BC Amarna letters correspondence. The name Karaduniyaš is mainly used in the letters written between Kadashman-Enlil I or Burna-Buriash, Kassite kings of Babylon, and the Pharaoh of Ancient Egypt - (called: Mizri), letters EA 1-EA 11, a subcorpus of letters, (EA for 'el Amarna'). The etymology of the name combines the Semitic prefix "Kar" used to denote a city or land with a Kassite element "duniash" which is of uncertain meaning. The term fell out of use after the Kassite period but the term "King of Karduniaš" was added to the Assyrian royal tutelary after the defeat of Kassite ruler Kashtiliash IV (c. 1232–1225 BC).

=== Karduniaš in the Amarna Letters ===
There are two additional letters in the 382–letter Amarna corpus that reference Karaduniyaš. The first is a damaged, and partial letter, EA 200, (with no author), regarding "Ahlameans", (similar to the Suteans); the title is: "About Ahlameans". The second letter is complete and undamaged, a letter from one of the sons of Labaya, namely Mutbaal - (Mut-Bahli, or Mut-Ba'lu), letter EA 255.

==== EA 255, Mutbaal letter no. 1 of 2, title: "No destination too far" ====
Letter 255 by Mutbaal, about caravans, seems to imply that his location in western Jordan, (as "Mayor of Pihilu"-(modern Pella, Jordan)), was an important trade route to the east to Babylonia, or north to Mittani.

Say [t]o the king, [my] lord and my Sun: Thus Mut-Bahl[u], your servant, the dirt at your feet, the mire you tread on. I fall at the feet of the king, my lord, 7 times and 7 times. The king, my lord, sent Haaya to me to say, "A caravan to Hanagalbat-(Mitanni), is this (man) to send on, and (all of you) send it on!" Who am I that I would not send on a caravan of the king, my lord, seeing that [La]b 'ayu, my father, [used to ser]ve the king, his lord, [and] he [himself] used to send on [all the carav]ans [that] the king [would se]nd to Hanagalbat. Let the king, my lord, send a caravan even to Karaduniyaš. I will personally conduct it under very heavy guard. -EA 255, lines 1-25 (complete)

==== EA 9, Burna-Buriash letter no. 4 of 6, title: "Ancient loyalties, new request" ====
(Para I, 1-6) Say- (qabu (qí-bil-ma)) to Nibhurrereya, the king of Egy[pt-(Mizri), my brother ]: "(message)-Thus"-(um-ma), Thus, the king of Karad[un]iyaš, your brother. For me all goes well. For you, your household, your wives, your sons, your country, your ma[g]nates, your horses, your chariots, may all go very well.
(Para II, 7-18) From the time my ancestors and your ancestors made a mutual declaration of friendship, they sen[t] beautiful greeting-gifts to each other, and refused no request for anything beautiful. My brother has now sent me 2–minas of gold as my greeting-gift. Now, (i)f gold is plentiful, overflowing, send me as much as your ancestors (sent), but if it is scarce, send me half of what your ancestors (sent). Why have you sent me 2–minas of gold? At the moment my work on a temple is extensive, and I am quite busy with carrying it out. Send me much gold. And you for your part, whatever you want from my country, write me so that it may be taken to you.
(Para III, 19-38) In the time of Kurigalzu, my ancestor, all the Canaanites wrote here to him, saying, "C[om]e to the border of the country so we can revolt and be allied [wi]th you!" My ancestor sent them this (reply), saying, "Forget about being allied with me. If you become enemies of the king of Egypt, and are allied with anyone else—will I not then come and plunder you? How can there be an alliance with me?" – For the sake of your ancestor, my ancestor did not listen to them. Now, as for my Assyrian vassals-(i.e. Ashur-uballit I, king), I was not the one who sent them to you. Why on their own authority have they come to your country? If you love me, they will conduct no business whatsoever. Send them off to me empty–handed. I send to you as your greeting-gift 3–minas of genuine lapis lazuli, and 5–teams of horses for 5–wooden chariots. -EA 9, lines 1-38 (3 paragraphs) (complete)

== Gallery ==
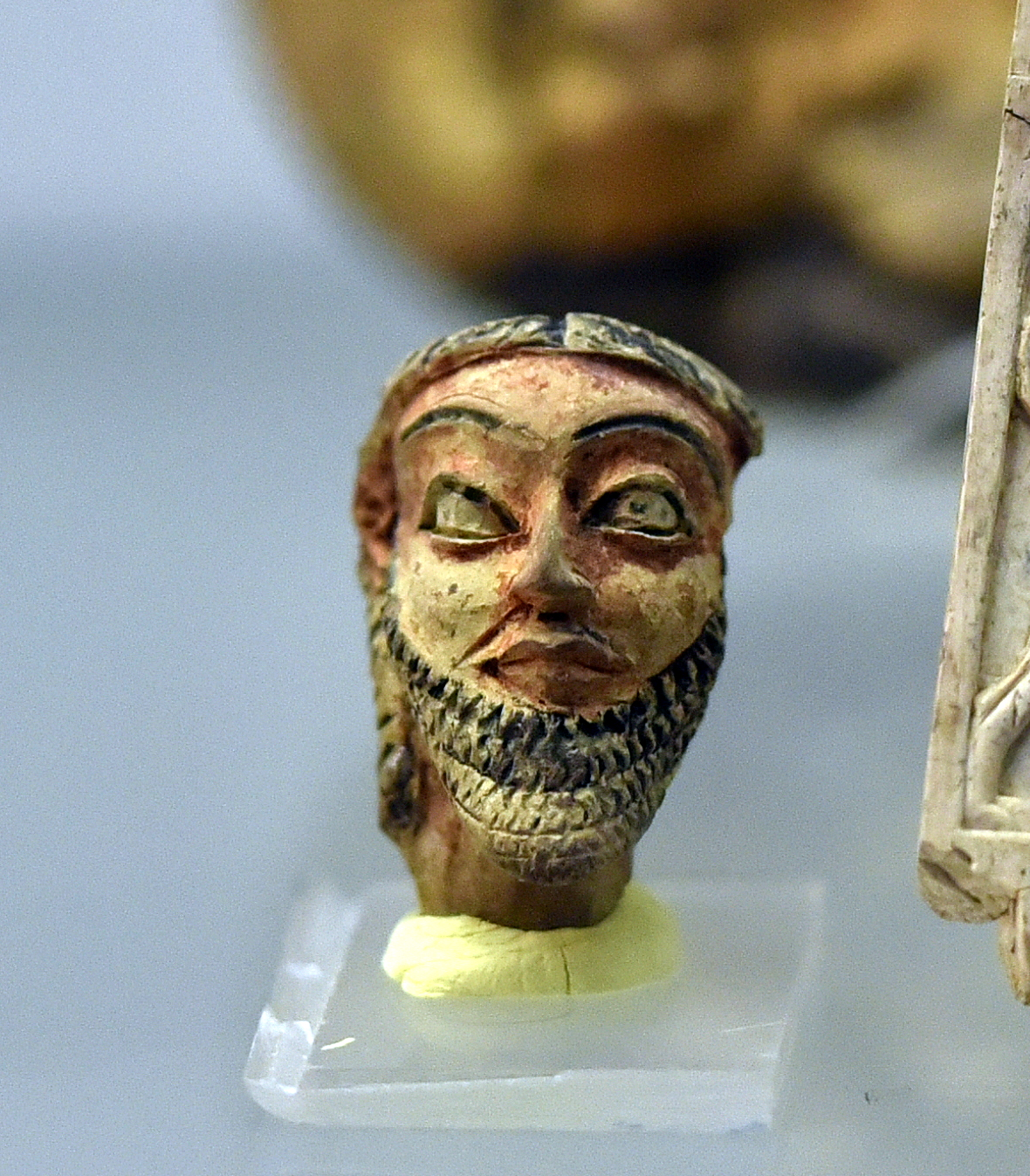
Male head from Dur-Kurigalzu, Iraq, Kassite, reign of Marduk-apla-iddina I. Iraq Museum

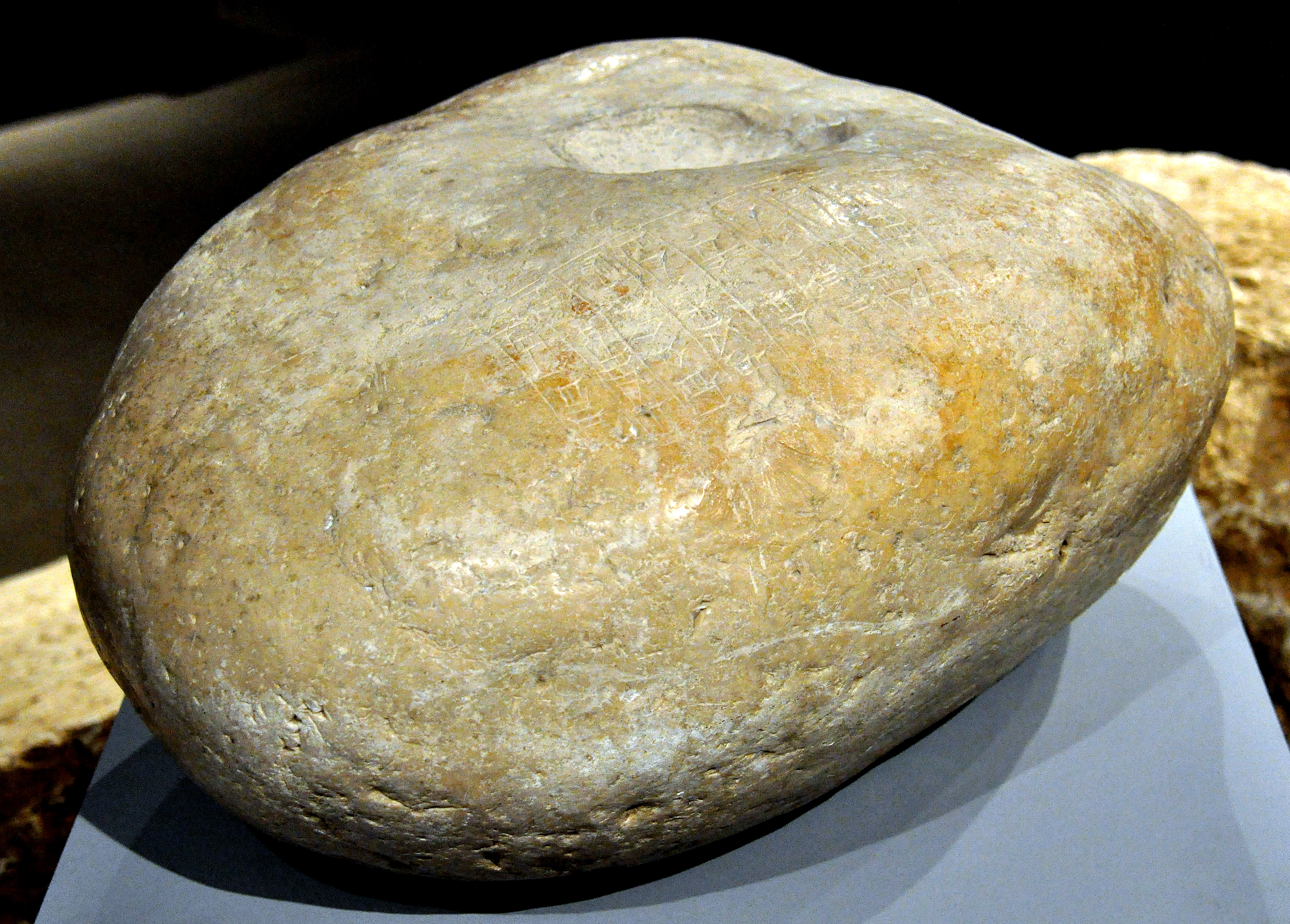
Door socket from Dur-Kurigalzu, Iraq. Kassite period, 14th century BCE. Sulaymaniyah Museum

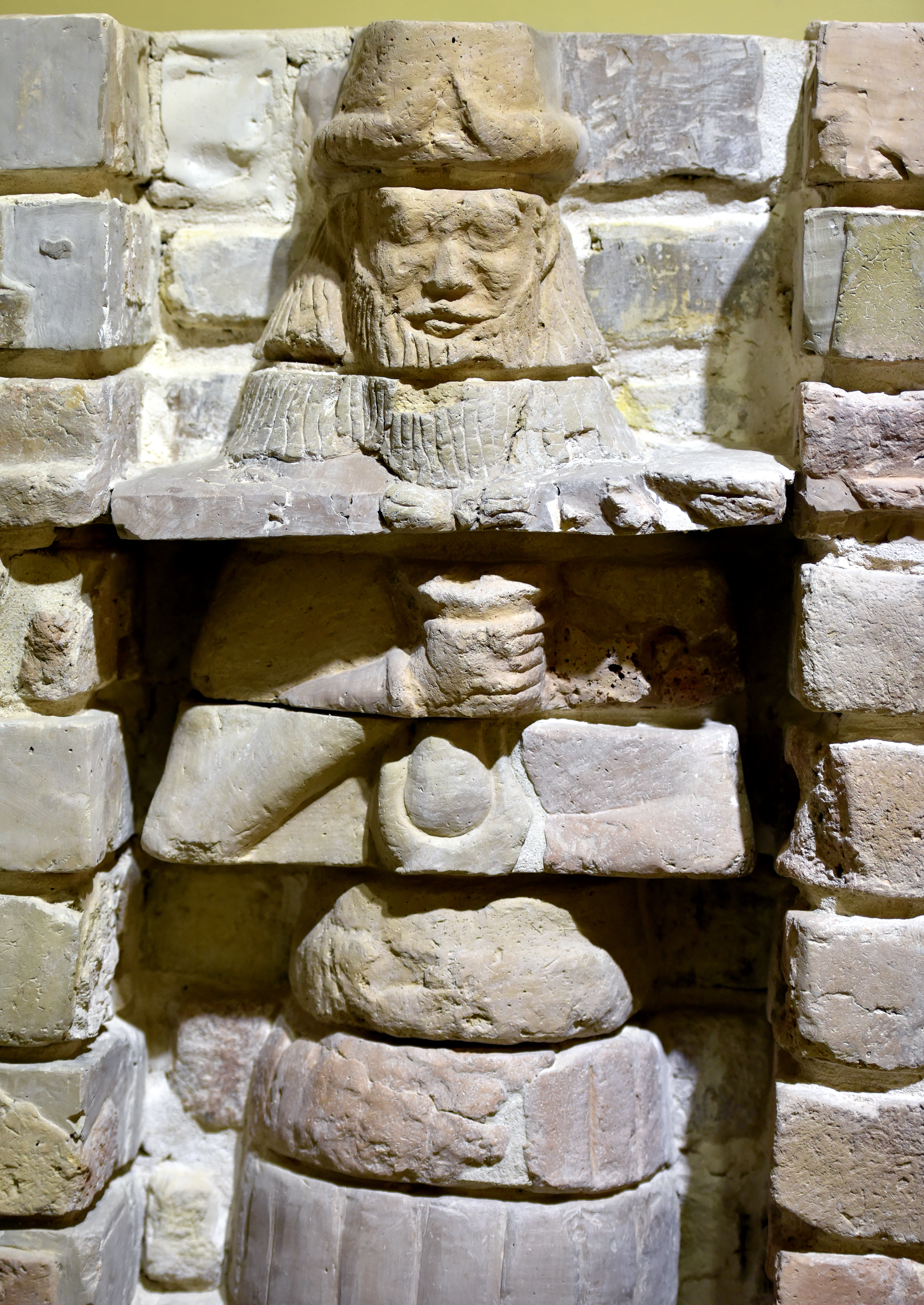
Detail, facade of Inanna's Temple at Uruk, Kassite, 15th century BCE. Iraq Museum

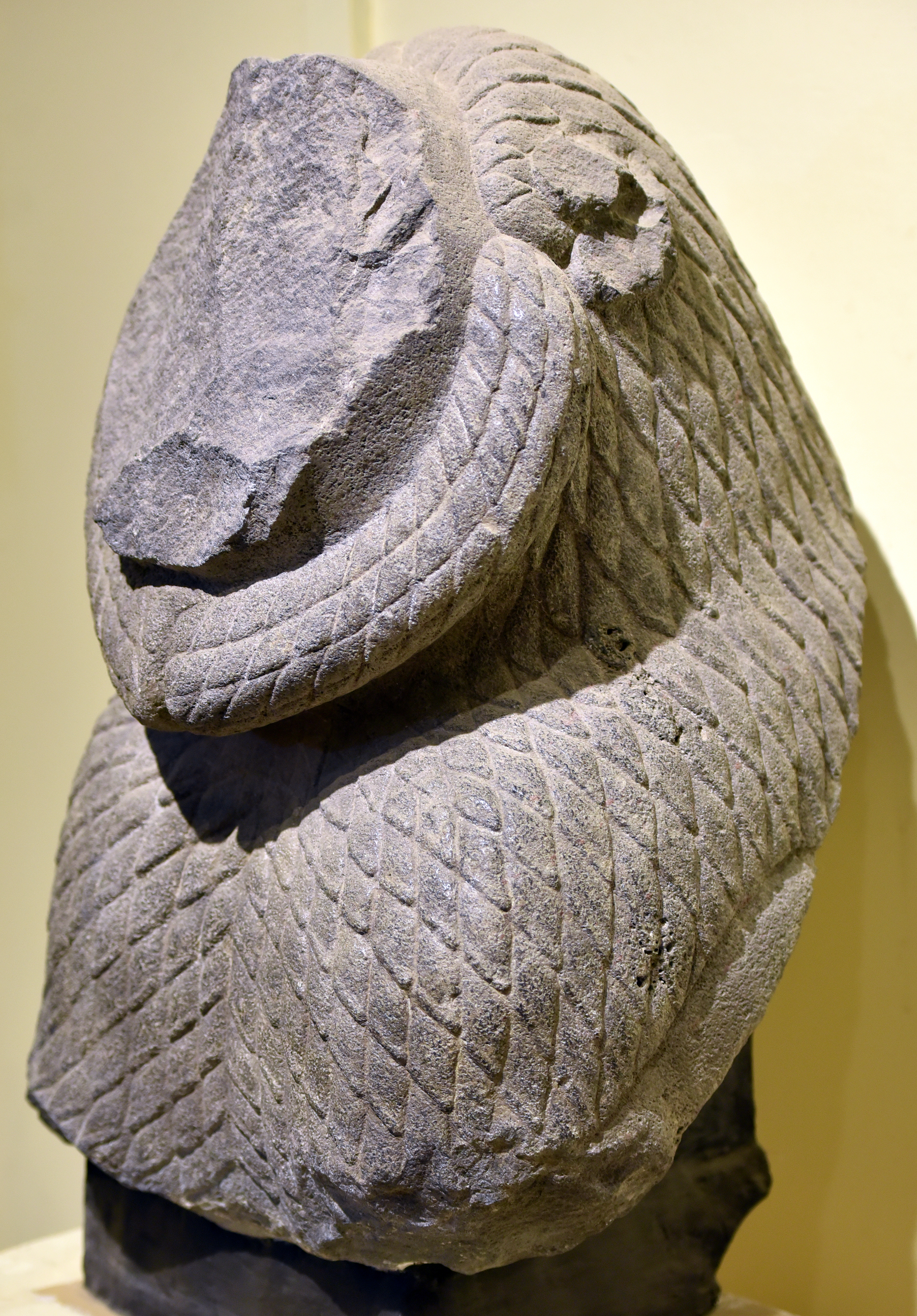
Statue of a lion, Kassite, Iraq Museum

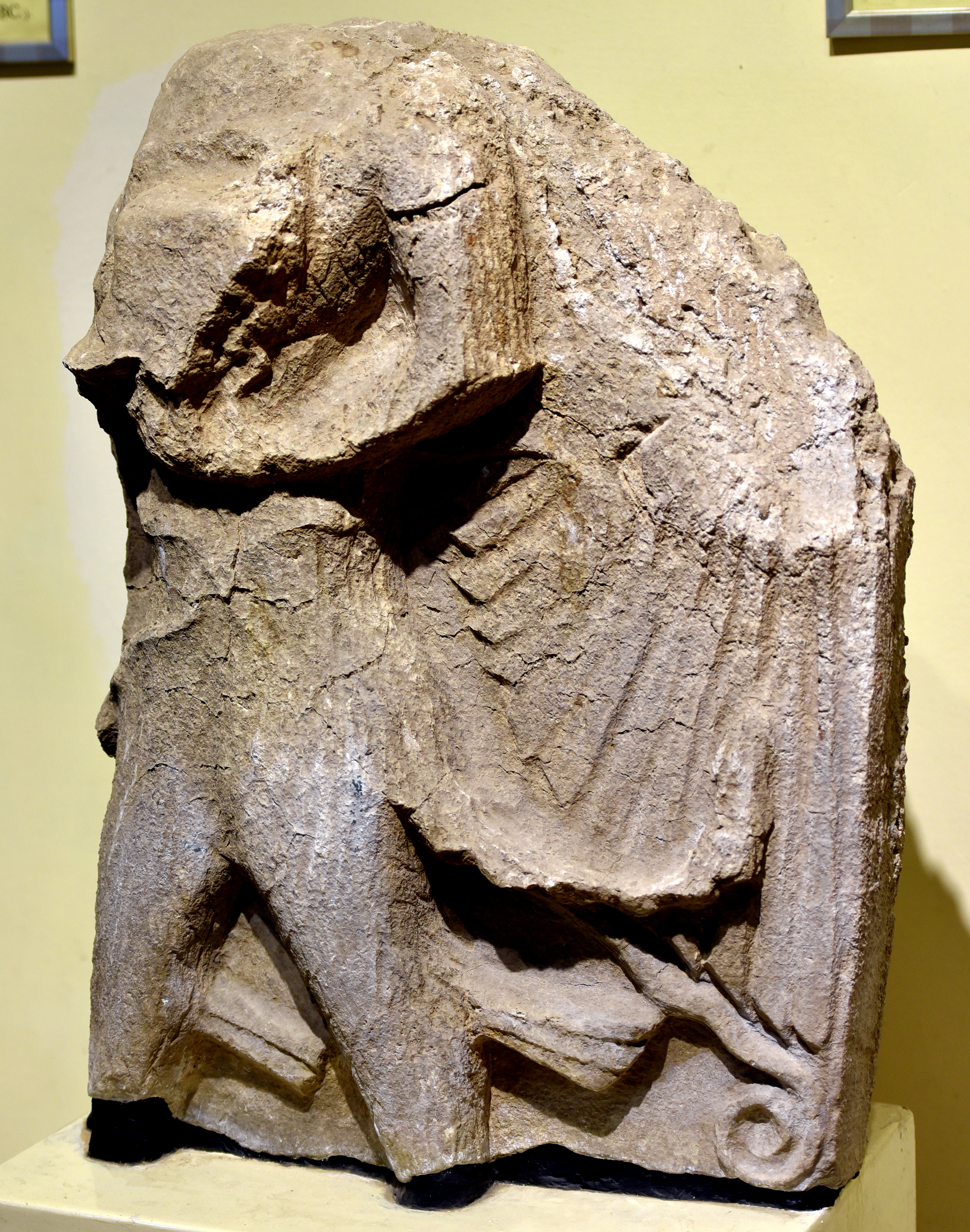
Limestone relief of a male figure from Tell al-Rimah, Iraq. Kassite. Iraq Museum

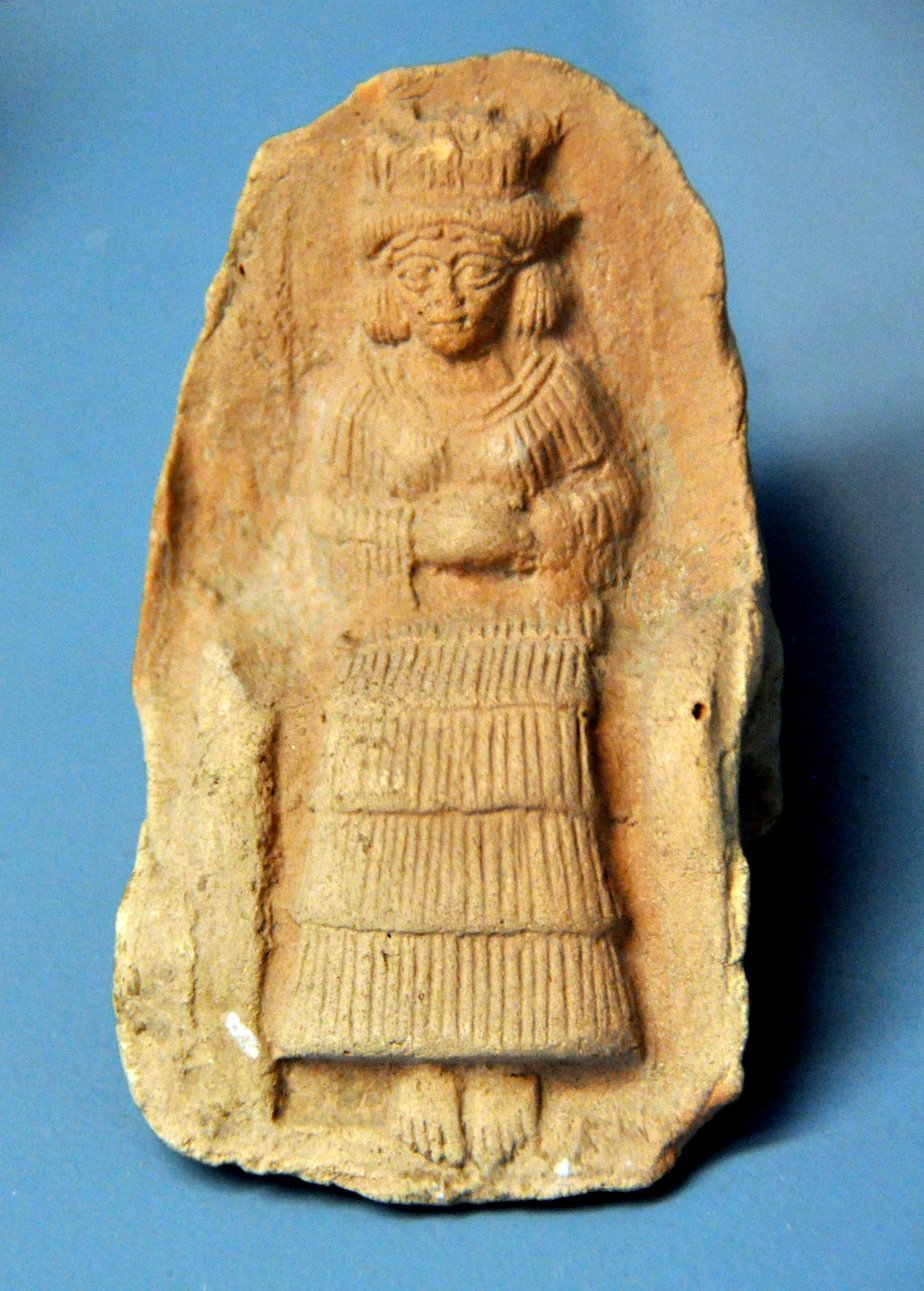
Terracotta plaque of a seated goddess, from Southern Mesopotamia, Iraq. Kassite period. Ancient Orient Museum

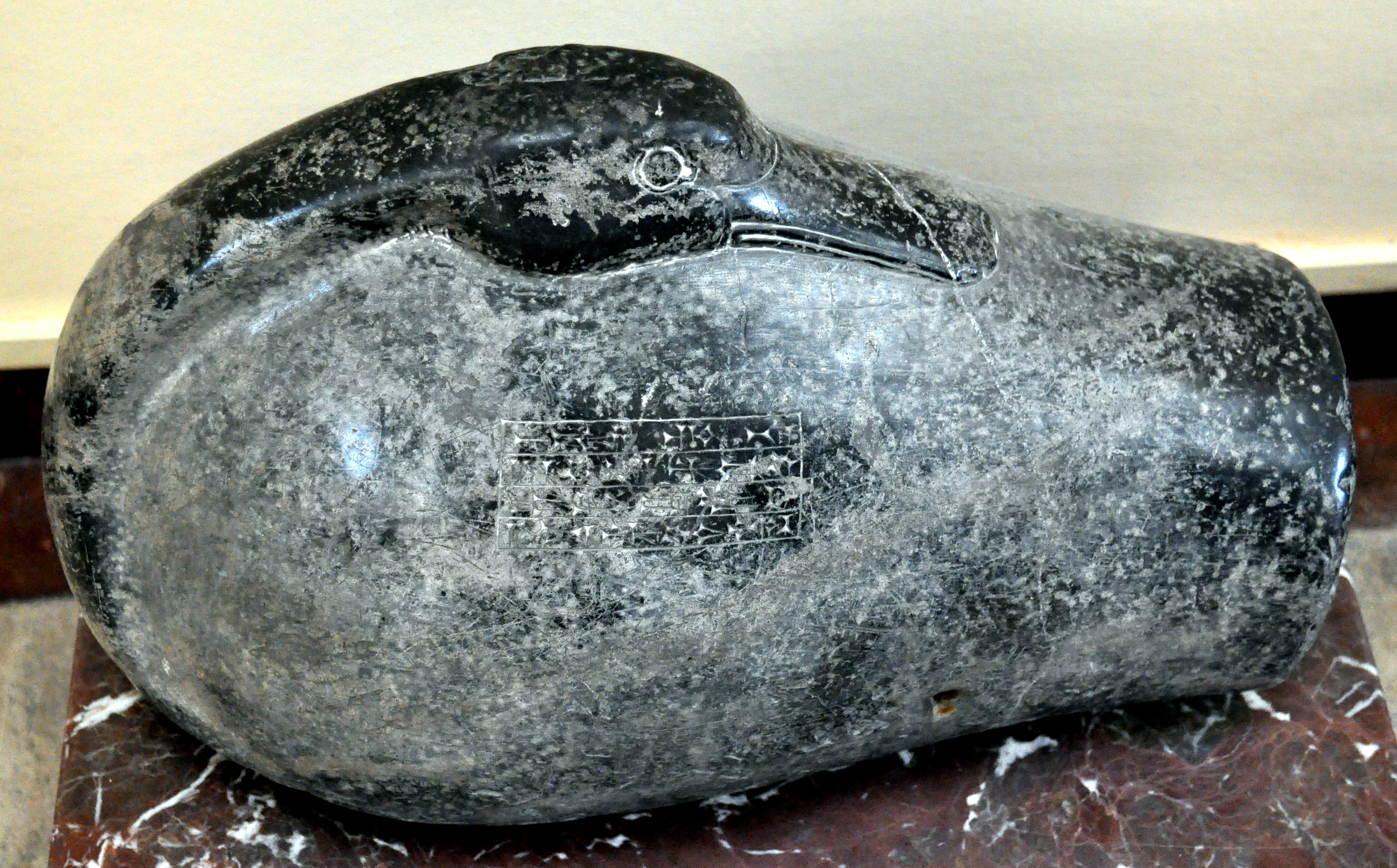
Duck-shaped weight mentioning the name of the priest Mashallim-Marduk, Kassite, from Babylon. Ancient Orient Museum

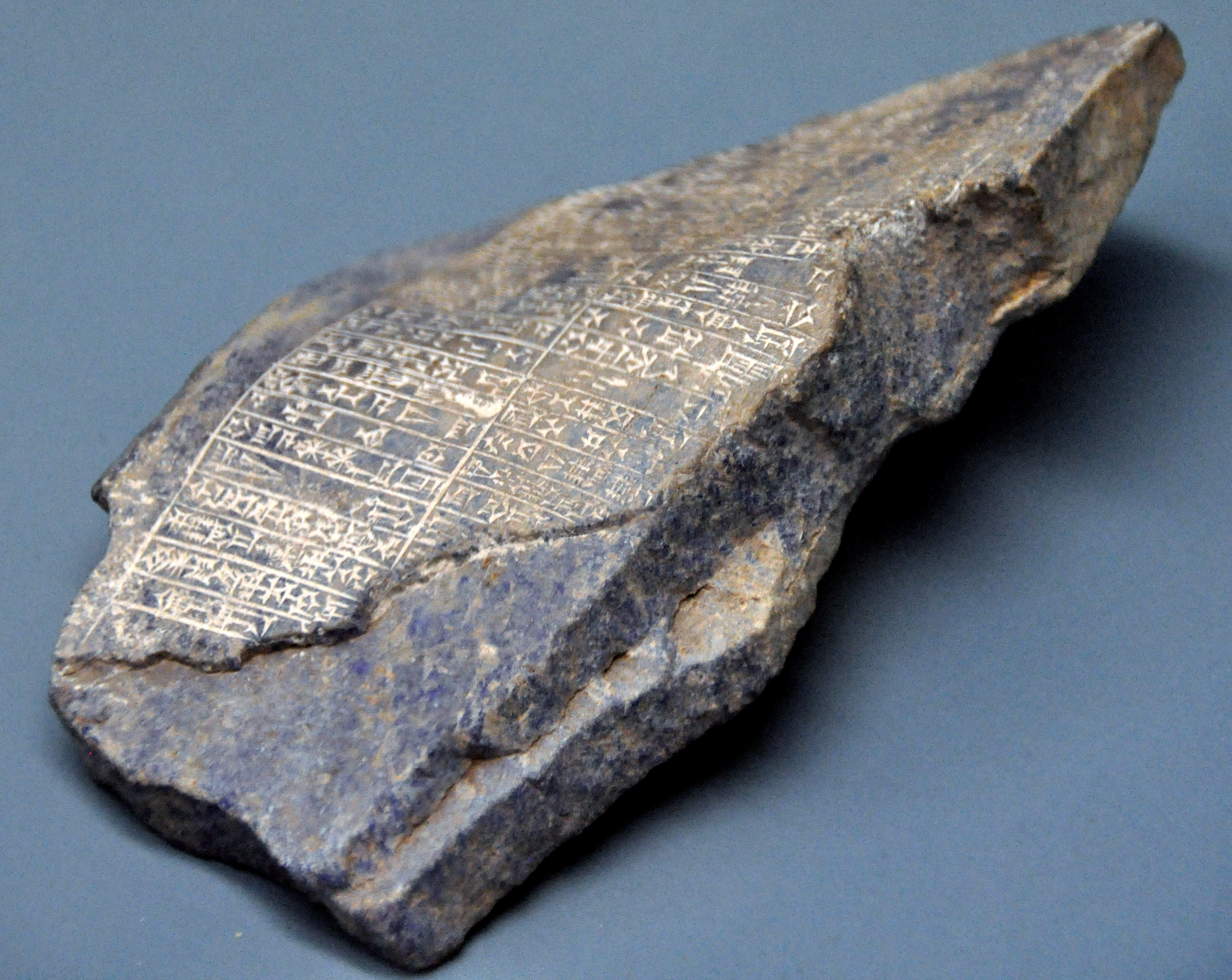
Lapis Lazuli fragment with building inscriptions, Kassite, from Iraq. Ancient Orient Museum

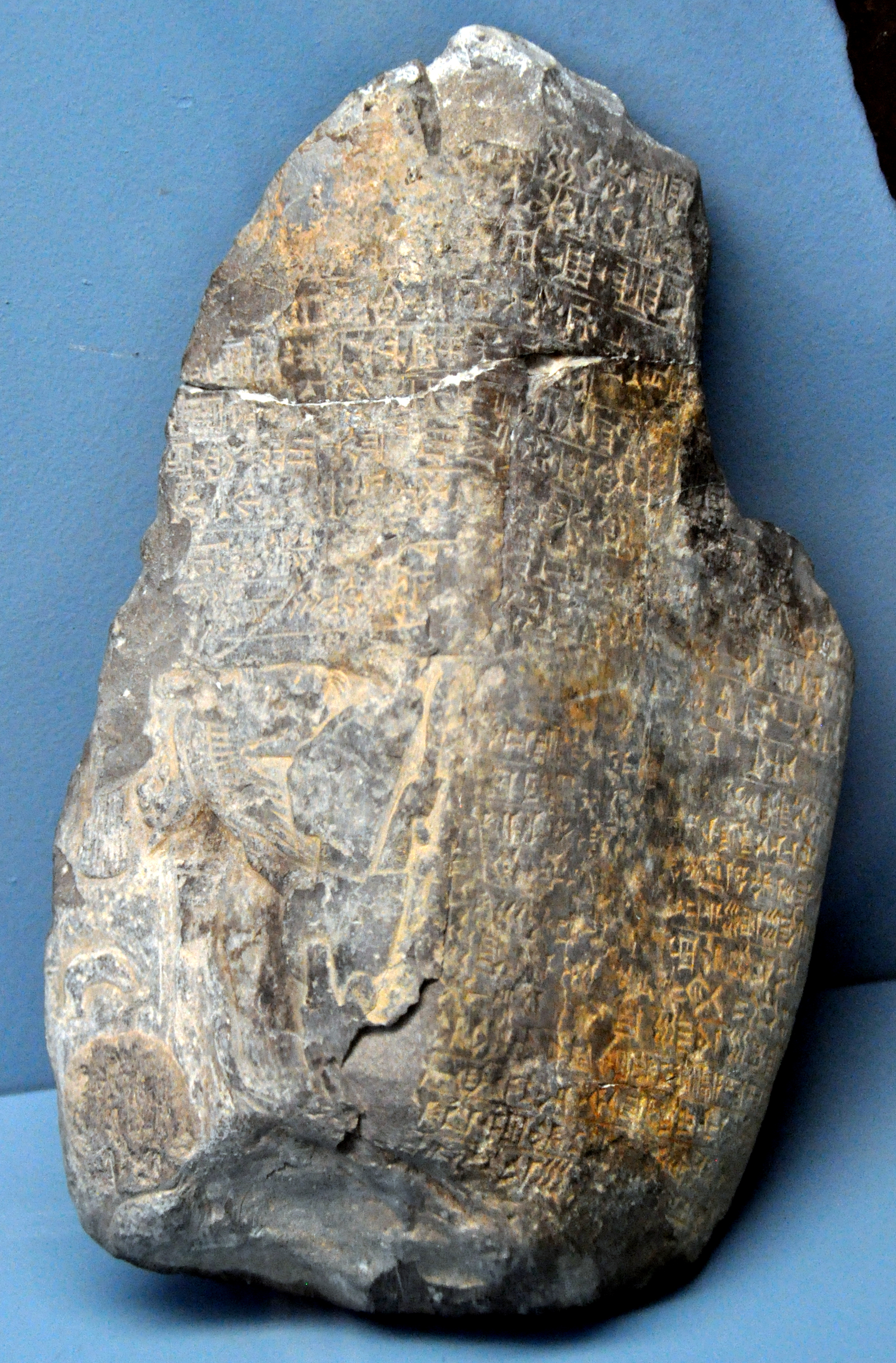
Kudurru mentioning the name of the Kassite king Kurigalzu II, from Nippur, Iraq, Ancient Orient Museum

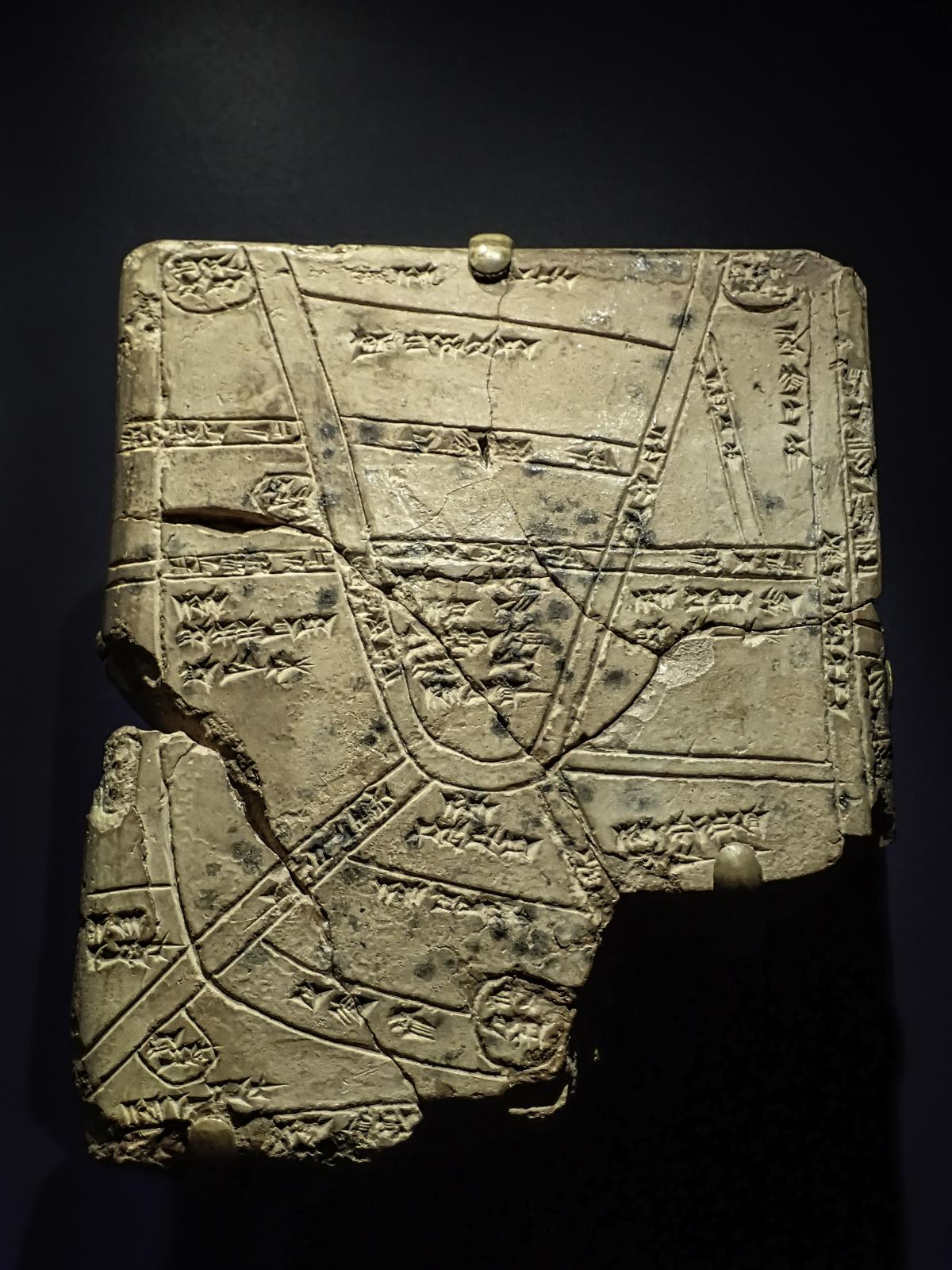
Babylonian cuneiform tablet with a map from Nippur, Kassite period, 1550-1450 BCE

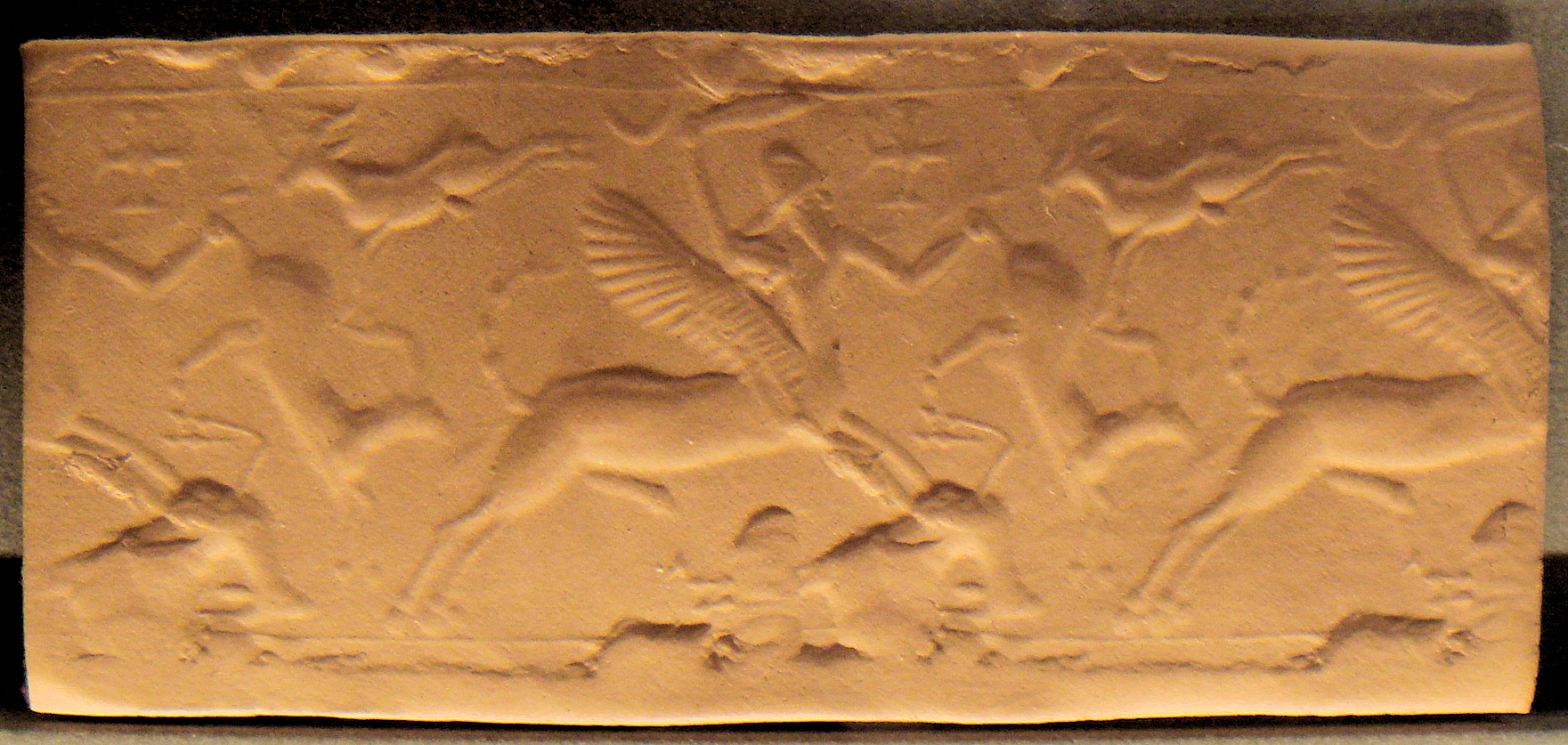
Winged centaur hunting animals. Kassite period. Louvre Museum, reference AO 22355

== See also ==
- Chronology of the ancient Near East
- List of Mesopotamian dynasties
- Cities of the ancient Near East
- Kassite deities
- Kassite language
- Kudurru
- Kassite Dynasty
- Cossaei

== Bibliography ==
- Balkan, Kemal (1954). Kassitenstudien: Die Sprache der Kassiten. American Oriental Society.
- Bartelmus, Alexa; Sternitzke, Katja (2017). Kardunias. Babylonia under the Kassites (in German). Vol. 1. De Gruyter. ISBN 978-1-5015-1163-9.
- Bartelmus, Alexa; Sternitzke, Katja (2017). Kardunias. Babylonia under the Kassites (in German). Vol. 2. De Gruyter. ISBN 978-1-5015-1216-2.
- Paulus, Susanne; Clayden, Tim (2020). Babylonia under the Sealand and Kassite Dynasties. De Gruyter. doi:10.1515/9781501510298. ISBN 978-1-5015-1029-8.

== Sources ==
- Abraham, K. (2013). Kaštiliašu and the Sumundar Canal: A New Middle Babylonian Royal Inscription. Zeitschrift Für Assyriologie & Vorderasiatische Archäologie, 103(2), 183–195. https://doi.org/10.1515/za-2013-0012
- Almamori, Haider Oraibi and Bartelmus, Alexa. "New Light on Dilbat: Kassite Building Activities on the Uraš Temple “E-Ibbi-Anum” at Tell al-Deylam" Zeitschrift für Assyriologie und vorderasiatische Archäologie, vol. 111, no. 2, 2021, pp. 174–190
- K. Balkan, Die Sprache der Kassiten, (The Language of the Kassites), American Oriental Series, vol. 37, New Haven, Conn., 1954.
- Bass, George F., et al. "The Bronze Age Shipwreck at Ulu Burun: 1986 Campaign." American Journal of Archaeology, vol. 93, no. 1, 1989, pp. 1–29
- Brinkman, J. A.. "The Names of the Last Eight Kings of the Kassite Dynasty" Zeitschrift für Assyriologie und Vorderasiatische Archäologie, vol. 59, no. Jahresband, 1969, pp. 231–246
- Brinkman, J. A. “Mu-Ús-Sa Dates in the Kassite Period.” Die Welt Des Orients, vol. 6, no. 2, 1971
- Ferrara, A. J. “A Kassite Cylinder Seal from the Arabian Gulf.” Bulletin of the American Schools of Oriental Research, no. 225, 1977, pp. 69–69
- Albrecht Goetze, "The Kassites and Near Eastern Chronology," Journal of Cuneiform Studies, vol. 18, No. 4, pp. 97–101, 1964
- A. Leo Oppenheim, Ancient Mesopotamia: Portrait of a Dead Civilization, 1964.
- Walter Sommerfield, The Kassites of Ancient Mesopotamia: Origins, Politics, and Culture, vol 2 of J. M. Sasson ed. Civilizations of the Ancient Near East, Charles Scribner's Sons, 1995
