= Dūr-Abī-ešuḫ =

Ancient Mesopotamian city

Dūr-Abī-ešuḫ (also Dūr-Abiešuḫ) was built by Abi-Eshuh (c. 1648–1620 BC) a ruler of the First Dynasty of Babylon. Its name means "Fortress of Abi-Eshuh". A year name of that ruler reads "Year in which Abi-eszuh the king built 'Dur-Abi-eszuh-szarrum / the fortress of Abi-eszuh the king' above / upstream the gate of the city on the bank of the Tigris". Its location is not yet known though it is thought to be near the ancient city of Nippur and presumably on the Tigris river. In cuneiform text it is usually called Dur-Abi-ešuh^{(canal)} or more formally Dur-Abi-ešuh^{ki} ša zibbat ^{i₇}Hammu-rabi-nuhuš-niši meaning "Dur-Abiešuh-at-the-outlet-of-the-canal-Hammu-rabi-nuhuš-niši". In occasional unprovenaced tablets it is called Dur-Abi-ešuh^{(Tigris)}. Recent thinking is that there was actually a pair of fortresses with the name Dur-Abi-ešuh. While the site has not been found hundreds of cuneiform tablets began appearing on the antiquities market beginning around 1998 and as they are published more is being learned about the site. Texts are thought date from Abiešuḫ year 4 to Samsuditana year 15, a period of about 97 years (the order of Babylon ruler year names is not known with complete certainty). Because the threat from the Sealand dynasty and the movement of the Tigris river forced some cultic institutions, including that of the prominent Ekur temple community of Enlil, to move to Dur-Abi-ešuh there should be a number of temple records there.

A possible name has been suggested as Zibbat-narim. It has also been suggested that after the fall of Babylon Dūr-Abiešuḫ was renamed to Dūr-Enlil and became the capital of the First Sealand dynasty.

== History ==
Regional map for context

Dūr-Abī-ešuḫ is attested to have been occupied during the reigns of four contiguous rulers of Babylon, Abi-Eshuh, Ammi-Ditana, Ammi-Saduqa and Samsu-Ditana. This period marked the slow decline of the Old Babylonian Empire from the glory days of Hammurabi and the early rise of the First Sealand Dynasty beginning under its first ruler Ilum-ma-ilī (Ilī-ma-AN). Under ruler Samsu-iluna, predecessor of Abi-Eshuh, Babylon lost effective control over Nippur to Ilum-ma-ilī and Sealand. Abi-Eshuh fortified the southern region of the Babylonian empire and dammed the Tigris river and as a result full control of Nippur had been regained by his 5th year. It is known that on or about year 11 of the reign of Ammi-Ditana, successor in Babylon to Abi-Eshuh, the major city of Nippur came under attack and was again partially abandoned. Dūr-Abī-ešuḫ was pivotal in the defense of Nippur.

== Sources ==
While the site has not been found, and very few of the royal texts of the rulers of Babylon were found in the excavations at that city, a number of cuneiform texts from Dūr-Abī-ešuḫ are available. Some come from texts sent to other cities and, in more significant numbers, those that have entered the illegal antiquities market, presumably looted from the site. The unprovenanced texts include a temple archive from Dur-Abi-ešuh^{(canal)} (92 texts in number have been published with another 400 still to be published), currently held at Cornell University. A few dozen more, some published, are held in the Schøyen Collection including divinatory texts. Most of the texts deal with the disbursement of commodities, typically silver, barley, and sesame and come from the reign of Samsu-Ditana. Several more exemplars of that archive has been found in the Cotsen collection. From the archive it was learned that in the time of ruler Samsu-iluna the river Tigris, which until then flowed past the city of Nippur, changed its course to the east. As a result, in year 22 of his reign much of the populace moved out of Nippur and many of the religious institutions in that city were moved northeast to the location of Dūr-Abī-ešuḫ though cultic activity continued at Nippur, though at a much reduced scale. At this time cultic activities at Dūr-Abī-ešuḫ and possibly the Ekur temple in Nippur were under the control of nešakkum-priest Enlil-mansum. Some of the tablets are administrative in nature. An example would be this purchase contract:

"[1]5 shekels of silver to buy a splendid (nam-ri) slave in the city of Bad-An, which Iddin-Mar-duk, the overseer of the Ninurta temple, gave to Enlil-muballiṭ, the nešakkum, the son of Ur-Sadarnuna. Within the month he will bring the splendid (nam-ra) slave from Bad-An. His bill will be settled, and the remainder will be paid to him in full."

Another exemplar, from the antiquities market, is held at Kunsthistorisches Museum in Vienna. It mentions Kassite troops under the command of Babylon, known from other sources. It is dated to the last year of Abi-Eshuh. While Kassites made up the majority of the garrison at Dūr-Abī-ēšuḫ, typical in the Late Old Babylonian period, garrison soldiers came from as far afield as Elam, Aleppo, Maskan-säpir, Suhum and Gutium. Dūr-Abī-ešuḫ was one of a number of fortresses established by Abi-esuh in southern Babylonia. The fortresses, at places like Nukar (near Nippur), Baganna, Isin, and Uruk were manned by a mix of soldiers including those from Ḫalaba, Arrapḫu, Idamaraṣ and Emutbalum. In total, at least 28 fortresses were known to be active in the Late Old Babylonian period, protecting a kingdom of diminished size with only the major cities Babylon, Sippar, Dilbat, and Kiš and smaller entities. The Babylonian forces at Dūr-Abī-ešuḫ included a large contingent of chariots with most of the charioteers coming from the Kassite Bimatû tribe though at least one, Šeri-akšer, was Elamite. Chariot forces also passed through Dūr-Abī-ēšuḫ on the way to destinations like Babylon. A number of the known tablets come from a "quartermasters archive" which involves the provisioning of troops.

One Late Old Babylonian text from Dūr-Abiešuḫ referred to Garbasû tasû the Aramean (ga-ar-ba-sú-ú a-ra-mu-ú), one of the earliest textual references to Arameans.

It is known that in the Late Babylonian period a Hammurabi-lū-dāri was a high official present at Dūr-Abī-ešuḫ, with the titles sagi “cupbearer” and gal.ukken.na “chief of the assembly”.

A number of Dūr-Abiešuḫ texts, as yet unpublished, are held in the Rosen Babylonian Collection which is now part of the Yale University collection.

== Location ==
While the location (or locations) of Dūr-Abī-ešuḫ is unknown some things are certain. It is close to the city of Nippur. It has generally been thought to be to the east. It is clearly associated with the Tigris river. It was definitely on the watercourse of the Tigris as it was in the Late Old Babylonian period. The recent view that there are actually a pair of sites causes complication. Dur-Abi-ešuh^{(canal)} is known to be at the junction of the Tigris river and the Hammu-rabi-nuhuš-niši (Hammurapi is abundance for the people) canal built in the 32nd year of his reign by Hammurabi to provide water to Nippur and point south. Unfortunately the location of that canal is unknown. Two fortresses were known to be on the canal, Dūr-Sîn-muballiṭ (at the intake of the canal) and Dur-Abi-ešuh (at the outtake of the canal). Dūr-Sîn-muballiṭ was built in year 9 of Sin-Muballit, father of Hammurabi, and apparently before the canal was constructed. Another fortress, Zibbat-narim, is known to have been on the Euphrates in the vicinity of Nippur and Dur-Abi-ešuh. The fortress Dur-šarrim, on the Tigris, is mentioned in texts from the site but its location is unknown. In two texts there is a travel itinerary "Dūr-Abīešuḫ at the Tigris dam to Dūr-Abīešuḫ at the outlet of the Ḫammurāpi-nuḫuš-nišī canal".

== See also ==
- Cities of the Ancient Near East
- List of Mesopotamian dynasties
