= Abi-Eshuh =

8th king of the 1st Dynasty of Babylon

King of Babylon
- Reign: c. 1712 – c. 1684 BC
- Predecessor: Samsu-iluna
- Successor: Ammi-Ditana
- Died: c. 1684 BC
- Issue: Ammi-Ditana
- Father: Samsu-iluna

Abī-ešuḫ (^{m}a-bi-e-šu-uḫ, variants: ^{m}a-bi-ši, (Note: Chronicle of Early Kings, (ABC 20), Tablet B, reverse, lines 8 to 10.) "Abiši", ^{m}E-bi-šum, (Note: Babylonian King List B, obverse line 8.) "Ebišum"; died c. 1684 BC) was the 8th king of the 1st Dynasty of Babylon and reigned for 28 years around 1712–1684 BC (Middle Chronology) or eight years later (Lower Middle Chronology). He was preceded by his father Samsu-iluna.

== Biography ==
His exuberant titles included, "descendant of Sumu-la-El, princely heir of Samsu-iluna, eternal seed of kingship, mighty king, king of Babylon, king of the land of Sumer and Akkad, king who makes the four quarters be at peace." This was presumably achieved by his two aggressive military campaigns. His fourth year-name records that he subdued the army of the Kassites. (Note: Tablet BM 16998.) The Chronicle of Early Kings recalls his damming of the Tigris River in a vain attempt to capture Ilum-ma-ilī, the founder of the Sealand Dynasty. A clay cylinder fragment (Note: Ash. 1924.616.) from Kish is tentatively assigned to this king because the events it commemorates coincide with three of his year-names. It mentions the Tigris River (year “o” the damming of the Tigris), the Tigris gate (year “m” the ká-gal-i_{7}idigna), the fashioning of a mace for Marduk (year “g”) and digging of the Zubi canal (year “I”). He is described as “the great champion” in his son, Ammī-ditāna's inscription, (Note: Late Babylon copy on a tablet, BM 38308.) and in the genealogy of his descendant Ammī-ṣaduqa.

The Elamites under their king Kutir-nahhunte I raided into Babylon early in his reign and sacked 30 cities.

Two copies of a building inscription (Note: Tablets BM 38446 and BM 55472 + 40125.) commemorate his construction activities at Luḫaia, a town founded by Hammurabi on the Araḫtum canal to the north of Babylon. A single inscription exists found on an onyx eye stone dedicated to the goddess Ningal. (Note: Eyestone, Ash. 1922.293.)

He is richly attested in the cylinder seal impressions of his minions with one (Note: On tablet MLC 2239 dated to year 20 of Ammī-ditāna, at Yale.) of his servant, Lamānum, son of Bēl-kulla, another (Note: On tablets YBC 8385 and YBC 5885 dated to Abī-Ešuḫ’s years “m” and “y,” at Yale.) of Luštāmar-Adad, son of Mār-Sipparim, another (Note: On tablet MLC 1539, at Yale.) of Nabi’um-an[dasa], son of Ilšu-ib[nīšu], another (Note: On tablet UMM 36, in the University Museum of Manchester.) ... son of Awīl-..., another (Note: Cylinder seal VA 3242, in Berlin.) Ilšu-nāṣir, diviner, son of Marduk-nāṣir, another a copy (Note: Cylinder seal BM 89101, in the British Museum.) Iddin-Šamaš, sanga priest of the goddess Ninisina, son of Ku-Ninisina, and another (Note: Cylinder seal in the Lands of the Bible Archaeology Foundation.) overseer of the merchants, Sīn-iddina[m] son of Šērum-bān[i]. The Uruk List of Kings and Sages (Note: W 20030,7 the Seleucid List of Sages and Scholars, recovered from Anu’s Bīt Rēš temple during the 1959/60 excavation.) records that "during the reign of Abī-ešuḫ, the king, Gimil-Gula and Taqis-Gula were the scholars.".

== See also ==
- Dūr-Abī-ešuḫ

== Inscriptions ==
| Preceded by Samsu-iluna | King of Babylon c. 1712 – c. 1684 BC | Succeeded by Ammi-Ditana |
