= Sutean language =

Ancient language of Syro-Mesopotamia

Sutean
- Sutû
- Region: Levant, Mesopotamia
- Ethnicity: Suteans
- Era: c. 18th–7th century BCE
- Language family: Afro-Asiatic: Semitic; (unclassified); Sutean

Language codes
- ISO 639-3: None (mis)
- Glottolog: None

The Sutean language (Sutû) is an unattested Semitic language spoken by the Suteans and mentioned in a clay tablet from the Middle Assyrian Empire, presumably originating from the city of Emar in what is now northeast Syria, among a list of languages spoken in the region. The other languages are Akkadian, Amorite, Gutian, "Subarean" (Hurrian) and Elamite. The Sutean people may have lived in the region of Suhum. Their language is only known from names, most of which are Akkadian or Amorite. The few which are neither also appear to be Semitic. According to Wolfgang Heimpel, Sutean may have been an early form of Aramaic or even Arabic, while emphasizing the former.
