= Pre-Sumerian substratum =

Hypothetical unclassified languages of late Neolithic Mesopotamia

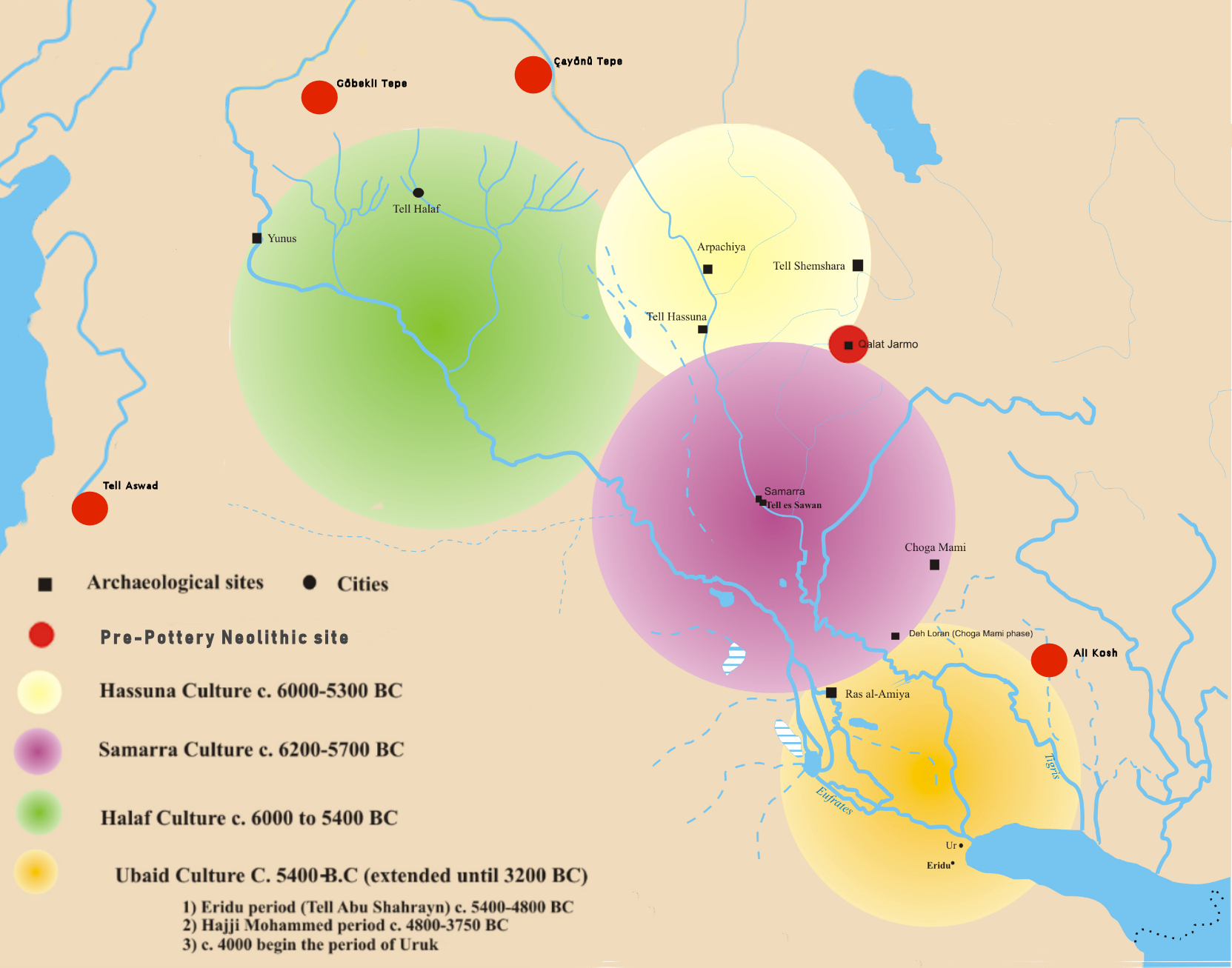
Map of the Halaf, Hassuna, Samarra and Ubaid cultures, whose languages may have contributed a substratum underlying Sumerian

The Pre-Sumerian substratum is a hypothetical unclassified language or languages which were considered by some Assyriologists (such as Samuel Noah Kramer) to be substratum languages, spoken by the people who introduced farming into Southern Iraq in the Early Ubaid period (5300–4700 BC), and preserved in the vocabulary of the Sumerian language.

Gonzalo Rubio challenged the substratum hypothesis, arguing that there is evidence of borrowing from more than one language, including Akkadian and Hurrian, and that many terms attributed to a Proto-Euphratean or Proto-Tigridic substratum are of native Sumerian origin.

== Proto-Euphratean language ==
Proto-Euphratean
- Proto-Euphratic
- Region: southern Iraq
- Era: Early Ubaid period (5500-4800 BCE)
- Language family: unclassified, hypothesized substratum

Language codes
- ISO 639-3: None (mis)
- Glottolog: None

Benno Landsberger and other Assyriologists argued that by examining the structure of Sumerian names of occupations, as well as toponyms and hydronyms, one can suggest that there was once an earlier group of people in the region who spoke an entirely different language, often referred to as Proto-Euphratean or Proto-Euphratic. The borrowings from this hypothetical language include the Sumerian names of the major Mesopotamian rivers, Idiglat (Tigris) and Buranun (Euphrates), as well as the names of Sumer's most important cities such as Eridu, Ur, Larsa, Isin, Adan, Kullab, Lagash, Nippur and Kish. Common nouns alleged to belong to this substrate include those for "farmer" (engar), "smith" (simug), "carpenter" (nangar), and even "merchant" (damgar), a word Samuel Kramer described as having "almost universally been taken to be a Semitic hallmark". Igor Dyakonov and Vladislav Ardzinba associated apparent Proto-Euphratean names recorded in the Ebla tablets with the Halaf culture.

== Proto-Tigridic languages ==
Landsberger attributed divine names, such as Dagan and Adad, to a distinct substratum spoken in northern Mesopotamia, which he referred to as Proto-Tigridic, named for the region around the Tigris and its tributaries. Dyakonov and Ardzinba associated Proto-Tigridic with a mixed population in this region which they suggested may be identical with the Samarra culture. They identified the Proto-Tigridic languages with the so-called "banana languages", named for a characteristic feature of multiple personal names attested in Sumerian texts, namely reduplication of syllables (as in the English word banana): Inanna, Zababa, Ḫuwawa, Bunene, etc. The same feature is allegedly attested by several names of Hyksos rulers, like Bnon and Apophis, (Note: As attested in later Greek sources.) which Dyakonov and Ardzinba attributed to non-Semitic origin, although the Hyksos tribes were Semitic Canaanites. However, this linguistic feature is also present in the Semitic languages, appearing in Akkadian, Assyrian and Babylonian texts, as well as in the vocabularies of the surviving West Semitic languages. Vladimir Solomatin suggests that the Proto-Tigrid substratum can be explained by borrowings from Semitic languages. The same feature was attested in some other unclassified languages, including Minoan.

== Indo-European 'Euphratic' language ==
Gordon Whittaker proposed that the language of the proto-literary texts from the Late Uruk period (c. 3350 – c. 3100 BC) is an early Indo-European language that he terms "Euphratic", although this does not have mainstream support. Sylvie Vanséveren argued that apparent evidence for "Euphratic" is better explained by reflexes of Sumerian or possibly linguistic contacts with the Proto-Indo-European language itself, though there is no evidence to suggest that such contacts would have occurred in Mesopotamia.

== See also ==
- Subarian language
- Sumerian problem
