= Arthur Ungnad =

German Assyriologist (1879–1947)

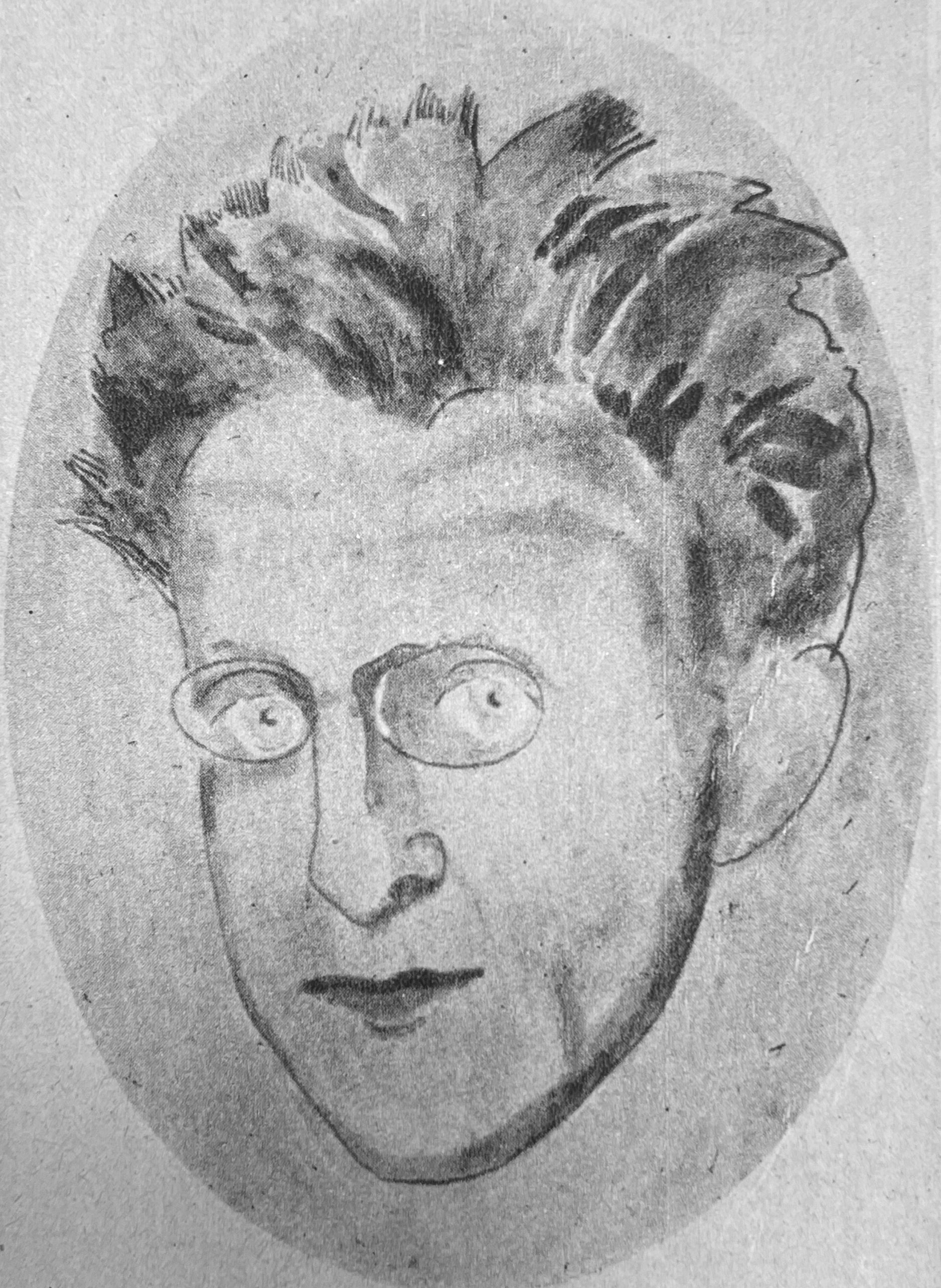
- Born: Arthur Franz Eduard Ungnad; August 3, 1879; Magdeburg, Province of Saxony, Kingdom of Prussia, German Empire
- Died: April 26, 1947 (aged 67); Falkensee, Brandenburg, Germany
- Citizenship: Germany
- Occupations: Ancient historian; Assyriologist; Orientalist; University lecturer

Academic background
- Education: Humboldt University of Berlin
- Academic advisors: Heinrich Zimmern and Friedrich Delitzsch

Arthur Franz Eduard Ungnad (3 August 1879 – 26 April 1947) was a German Assyriologist and Semitologist that focused on translations, linguistic studies, inscriptions, folklore and other parts of Ancient Mesopotamian cultures such as the Hebrews, Hurrians, Assyrians, Babylonians and Subarians.

== Biography ==
Ungnad studied Assyriology under Heinrich Zimmern and Friedrich Delitzsch and in 1903 defended his doctoral dissertation in the Humboldt University of Berlin on the syntax of the Code of Hammurabi. He worked as an assistant in the Vorderasiatisches Museum Berlin in Berlin. In 1909, Ungnad accepted an invitation from the University of Jena to the post of extraordinary professor of Oriental philology. In 1913, he was appointed full professor at the University of Pennsylvania. In 1919, Ungnad was appointed full professor at the University of Greifswald and in 1921, at the University of Wrocław. In 1930, he became professor Emeritus.

Ungnad's main area of research was the Assyrians and Babylonians, particularly their religious texts. Ungnad co-edited the collection "Assyrian Texts and Images of the Old Testament" (Altorientalische Texte und Bilder zum Alten Testament), together with Erich Ebeling, Hugo Gressmann and Hermann Ranke. Ungnad translated the Epic of Gilgamesh and published the text of the Elephantine papyri and ostraca. Since 1900, Ungnad has been developing his own theory, according to which the inhabitants of Subartu not only founded the Assyrian state but also spread throughout the territory between Anatolia and Egypt. He wrote grammar books for the Hebrew and Syriac languages.

== Essays ==
- Babylonisch-assyrische Grammatik. Beck, München 1906; 2nd Edition (= Clavis linguarum semiticarum. Band 2) 1926 (Arthur Ungnad at the Internet Archive); 3rd edition. 1949 edition as Grammatik des Akkadischen; 6th edition, completely revised by Lubor Matouš, 2007, ISBN 978-3-406-02890-8.
- Die Deutung der Zukunft bei den Babyloniern und Assyrern (= Der Alte Orient. Band 10.3). Hinrichs, Leipzig 1909.
- Aramäische Papyrus aus Elephantine. Small edition based on Eduard Sachau’s first edition, edited by Arthur Ungnad. Hinrichs, Leipzig 1911 (openlibrary.org).
- The Epic of Gilgamesh. Newly translated by Arthur Ungnad and explained in layman's terms by Hugo Gressmann. Vandenhoeck & Ruprecht, Göttingen 1911 (Arthur Ungnad at the Internet Archive).
- Hebräische Grammatik. Mohr, Tübingen 1912 (Arthur Ungnad at the Internet Archive).
- Syrische Grammatik (= Clavis linguarum semiticarum. Volume 7). Beck, München 1913, 2nd revised edition 1932; numerous reprints.
- Die Religion der Assyrer und Babylonier (= Religiöse Stimmen der Völker. Band 3). Diederichs, Jena 1921 (Arthur Ungnad at the Internet Archive).
- Die ältesten Völkerwanderungen Vorderasiens. Ein Beitrag zur Geschichte und Kultur der Semiten, Arier, Hethiter und Subaräer (= Kulturfragen. Volume 1). Self-published, Breslau 1923 (Arthur Ungnad at the Internet Archive).
- Babylonisch-assyrisches Keilschriftlesebuch (= Clavis linguarum semiticarum. Volume 8). Beck, München 1927.
- Subartu. Beiträge zur Kulturgeschichte und Völkerkunde Vorderasiens. De Gruyter, Berlin / Leipzig 1936 (Arthur Ungnad at the Internet Archive – sample reading).

== Literature ==
- Ungnad, Arthur. In: Gerhard Lüdtke (ed.): Kürschners Deutscher Gelehrten-Kalender. Founded by Joseph Kürschner. 4th edition. De Gruyter, Berlin 1931, OCLC 257208441.
- Ernst Friedrich Weidner: Arthur Ungnad. In: Archiv für Orientforschung. Band 15, 1945–1951, S. 175–176, JSTOR 41635714.
- Anke Weschenfelder: Ungnad, Arthur (Franz Eduard). In: Deutsches Literatur-Lexikon. 3. Auflage. Band 24, 2004, Sp. 565 f.
