= Gutian language =

Extinct unclassified language of the Near East

Gutian
- Native to: Gutium
- Region: Zagros Mountains?
- Ethnicity: Guti
- Era: Bronze Age (EBA IV)
- Language family: unclassified

Language codes
- ISO 639-3: None (mis)
- Glottolog: guti1235
- Near East in the 3rd millennium BCE

Gutian (/ˈɡuːtiən/) is an extinct unclassified language that was spoken by the Gutian people, who briefly ruled over Sumer as the Gutian dynasty in the 22nd century BCE. The Gutians lived in the territory between the Zagros Mountains and the Tigris. Nothing is known about the language except its existence and a list of names of Gutian rulers in the Sumerian King List, which may reflect elements of the language.

== Evidence ==
The Gutian language lacks a textual corpus and contemporary sources provide few details about the language, providing only a list of ruler names from the Gutian rule in Mesopotamia in the Sumerian King List and a single mention of ruler Sharlag in a year name of Akkadian Empire ruler Shar-kali-sharri. Different Sumerian King List manuscripts record different Gutian kings in different orders. Some names may be from other groups, and the transmission of the names is unreliable.

Thorkild Jacobsen suggested that the recurring ending -(e)š may have had a grammatical function in Gutian, perhaps as a case marker.

=== Other mentions ===
Gutian is included in a list of languages spoken in the region found in the Sag B tablet, an educational text from the Middle Babylonian period possibly originating from the city of Emar. This text also lists Akkadian, Amorite, Sutean, "Subarean" (Hurrian) and Elamite. There is also a mention of "an interpreter for the Gutean language" in a tablet from Adab.

== Tocharian theory ==
In a posthumously-published article, W. B. Henning suggested that the different endings of the king names resembled case endings in the Tocharian languages, a branch of Indo-European known from texts found in the Tarim Basin (in the northwest of modern China) dating from the 6th to 8th centuries CE. Henning also pointed to the phonological similarity of the name Guti to Kuči, the native name of the Tocharian city of Kucha. He also stated that the Chinese name Yuezhi, referring to nomadic pastoralists living in the grasslands to the northeast of the Tarim in the 2nd century BCE, could be reconstructed as Gu(t)-t'i. However, this name is usually reconstructed with an initial *ŋʷ- in Old Chinese. Henning also compared the name of a country called Tukriš, listed with Gutium and other neighbouring countries in an inscription of Hammurabi, with the name twγry found in an Old Turkish manuscript from the early 9th century CE, which is thought to refer to the Tocharians. Most scholars rejected the attempt to compare languages separated by more than two millennia.
