= Subarians =

Ancient people of west Asia

- Map of the Ancient Near East, which includes Subartu, the region where the Subarians lived in.

Regions with significant populations
- Near East

Languages
- Akkadian, Subarian (Hurrian)

The Subarians were a hypothetical ancient people that inhabited the southwestern Armenian highlands and northern Mesopotamia and was the main population of the Kingdom of Subartu. It is possible that as early as the second half of the 3rd millennium BC, the Subarians were assimilated by the Hurrians, who mass settled the region during that time.

== History ==
The Subarian tribal union established a powerful central power in northern northern Mesopotamia in the 3rd millennium BC and from there spread to eastern Asia Minor, northern Syria, and Armenia. According to some historians, the Subarians are the oldest historical people of these lands. According to historian Sydney Smith, the Subarians were a people who descended from the mountains in the northern and northeastern parts of Assyria.

They waged long wars against the Akkadian Empire to maintain their independence.

Regarding the power of Subartu, the Swiss scholar Emil Forrer states that Subartu was King Hammurabi's great rival during his reign (1955-1913 BC). From King Shamshi-Adad I (1808–1776 BC), the political destiny of Naxasia was controlled by Subartu as the kingdom of that world. During the reign of Agum I (1731-1710 BC) a great attack by Subartu took place on the land of Hatti. Although this great attack took possession of all the cities up to the interior of the Hatti state, Khantilis I (1740-1700 BC) was able to repel it. Then this wave swept towards Egypt, which fell victim to it and about 1700 BC. It remained under the rule of the Hyksos kings from 1700 to 1580. The starting point of these latter is Subartu".

The cause of the fall of the kingdom of Subartu was the continuous attacks of the Akkadian kings of Babylon, to whom the Subartu finally yielded due to internal disunity, weakened and submitted to their domination. The Akkadian kings, oppressing the population of Subartu, subjugated them. The archaeologist Sydney Smith made his observations about these events that there is no evidence that the Subarians formed a united kingdom in ancient times, in spite of the great spread and occasional successes that they had in the wars against the Sumerians. It is much more likely that as a mountain people, they lacked unity and central organization with each other, depriving themselves of any lasting significance.

== Culture ==
American archaeologist Leonard Wolley writes in his work "Carchemish": when the peaceful population of Mesopotamia lived in the Neolithic and when it was just beginning to get acquainted with copper, a new tribe arrived there who were warriors and had their own customs and high culture. These new tribes were probably the Subarians. Having settled in Mesopotamia, they subjugated the local population and created a high civilisation, which was a loanword from the Sumerian-Akkadian civilisation. The Subarians learned from the Sumerians the use of cuneiform inscriptions and for a long time used the Akkadian.

== Physical appearance ==
In Akkadian literature, the Subarians were described as a people of light complexion (ruddy or fair skinned), and in Babylon, Subarian female slaves were valued for their fair and pleasant appearance. If the Subarians were red-haired, then it may be easier to understand why the Sumerians were called "black-heads".

The assyriologist Ignace Gelb, based on Akkadian inscriptions, concluded that they were indeed described as a "light colored" and "fair-skinned" people. Ephraim A. Speiser, on the other hand, criticized the conventional translation of the Akkadian "namrum" as "light". Since he believed that the Subarians and Hurrians belonged to the Armenoid race, they could hardly have been light-complexioned. Speiser therefore proposed that namrum should instead be understood as "bright", in the sense of "intelligent". Gelb found no evidence of such an interpetation of namrum in Akkadian literature, and stated that we know in reality nothing about the racial characteristics of the Subarians.

== Language ==
Subarian
- Subarean, Subaraean, Subartian
- Native to: Subartu
- Region: Near East
- Ethnicity: Subarians
- Extinct: 3rd-2nd millennium BC
- Language family: Hurro-Urartian: Hurrian?; Subarian

Language codes
- ISO 639-3: None (mis)
- Glottolog: None

The terms referring to the language used in Subartu are known as Subarean, Subaraean, Subartian or Subarian. To this day it is uncertain what the Akkadian and Sumerian terms for Subartu refer to and it is believed it could refer to Hurrian.

It was generally believed early on by experts such as Adolf Leo Oppenheim and Arthur Ungnad that Subarian referred to Hurrian. The Hurrian language is described by the Sumerians and Babylonians as Subarian and for some modern historians, it is considered an obsolete term similar to Mitannian.

Early historians like Ignace Gelb and Ephraim Avigdor Speiser believe they were both independent of each other. Ignace also mentioned that there was not enough evidence on Subarian. The evidence we have for the language are Subarian names and possibly some words that late Assyrian syllabaries said were used in Subartu. It has been suggested that the non-Sumerian and non-Semitic languages found in southern Iraq known as Proto-Euphratean should be considered as Subarean and that the names of texts found from that age of ancient deities were later adopted by the Sumerians. It was also believed at the time that the Subarian language concealed languages like Gutian and Lullubian.

Gonzalo Rubio believes that Subarian could possibly be a term used for multiple languages spoken in Subartu, but also believes that the Subarian language hasn't been indicated to be Hurrian.

There is also a belief that Subarian was one of the Hurro-Urartian languages that was different from Hurrian as the Subarians established themselves earlier into Anatolia. This would be supported by the Subarian word for tree (sarme), which is similar to the Urartian word (sare) and the Hurrian word for garden (šahri).

== See also ==
- Lullubi
- Gutians
- Kassites
