= Sumerian problem =

Debate concerning the origins of the Sumerians

The Sumerian problem is a debate in the study of ancient Mesopotamia concerning the origins of the Sumerians and the extent to which the culture of ancient Mesopotamia can be attributed specifically to them. The problem developed from the 19th century onwards as new questions emerged. According to Jean M. Evans, "[d]ebate over the Sumerian problem permeated most aspects of early ancient Near Eastern scholarship until well into the twentieth century".

Herman L. J. Vanstiphout distinguishes three main successive "Sumerian questions":

- The first Sumerian question was about the existence of the Sumerian language. The question became particularly prominent in the late 19th century, when Joseph Halévy and other "anti-Sumerists" disputed the existence of Sumerian as a language distinct from Akkadian.
- The second Sumerian question was concerned primarily with archaeology and history and partly overlapped with the first, focusing on the origins of the Sumerians and the question of where they came from. It was the object of Henri Frankfort's Archeology and the Sumerian Problem, published in 1932.
- The third Sumerian question concerned the relationship between the Sumerians and Akkadians and the interpretation of the so-called Sumerian “Renaissance” during the Ur III period (2112–2004 BCE).

Quoting A Dictionary of Archaeology:

It seems likely that the Sumerian population actually included both Sumerian and Semitic linguistic/ethnic elements, although all may have shared the same Sumerian material culture, thus making them difficult to distinguish in archaeological terms – this quandary is usually described as the ‘Sumerian problem’. As Harriet Crawford (1991:20) points out, 'It is not possible to tell how much of this culture should be attributed to the Sumerian speakers and how much to those speaking a Semitic language, but the question hardly matters as it seems to have been the fusion of all the elements in the population which produced the distinctive [Sumerian] civilization ...'. It is clear, however, that the term Sumerian can be comfortably applied, in a general sense, to the culture that dominated Mesopotamia for two millennia, from the Uruk period to the end of the Early Dynastic phase (c. 3800–2010 BC).

== See also ==
- Pre-Sumerian substratum
