= Suteans =

Semitic people who lived throughout the Levant and Canaan c. 1350 BC

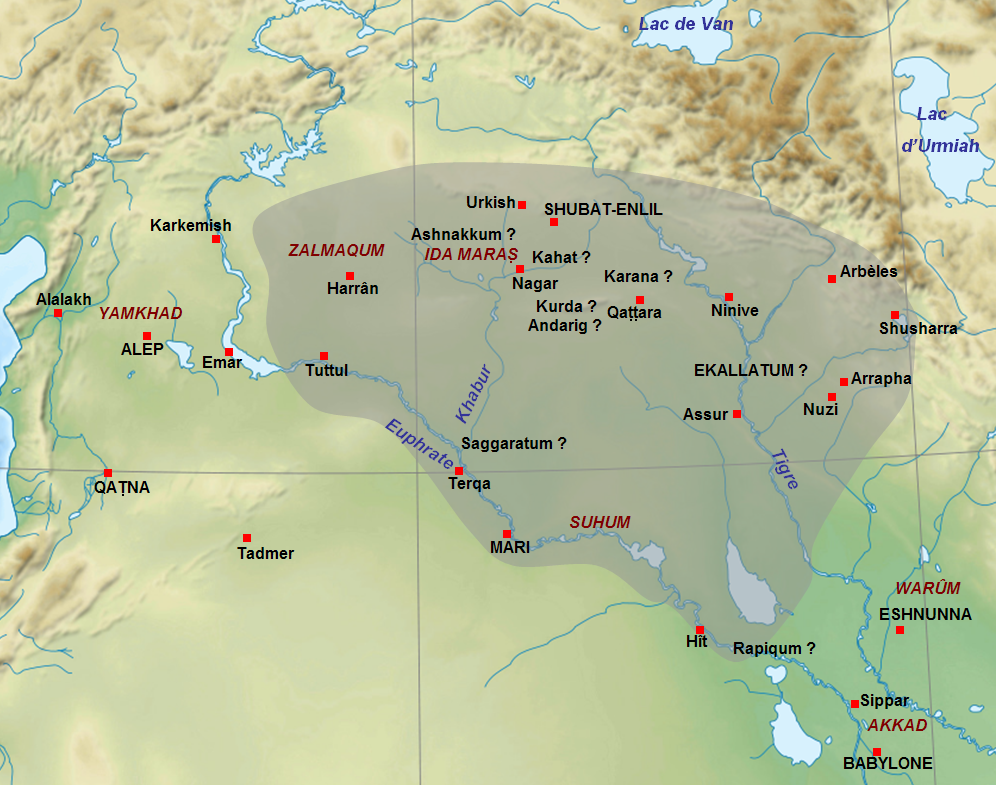
Map of Mesopotamia during the kingdom of Shamshi-Adad I showing the location of Suhum, the homeland of Suteans

The Suteans (Akkadian: Sutī’ū, possibly from Amorite: Š^{e}tī’u) were a Semitic-speaking nomadic people who were attested throughout Mesopotamia, the Levant and Canaan. They were famous in Semitic epic poetry for being fierce nomadic warriors, and like the ʿApiru, traditionally worked as mercenaries. The Suteans spoke the Sutean language, an unattested Semitic language possibly related to later Aramaic or even Arabic. They may have been part of the broader Ahlamu confederation.

== Name & etymology ==
According to Diakonoff, the name of the Suteans and the biblical name Seth (Hebrew: שֵׁת, Modern: Šēt, Tiberian: Šēṯ; "placed, appointed") derive from the same root. In the oracles of Balaam, the "sons of Seth" are cast as adversaries of the Israelites mentioned in unison with Se'īr, a role that finds a parallel in the Babylonian Erra Epic, where the Suteans are depicted as enemies of civilization.

== History ==
=== Bronze Age ===
The earliest attestations of Suteans during the Old Babylonian period place them in the region of Suhum by the Euphrates close to lower Mesopotamia. One early report mentions a Sutean raid on Qatna and Tadmor during the reign of Kingdom of Upper Mesopotamia ruler Shamshi-Adad I (c. 1808–1776 BC). They frequently attacked Mari's domains as a reprisal against what they saw as unjust Mariote hegemony over their territories in Suhum. A Sutean chieftain, Hammi-Talu, seems to have rendered services for Mari during the reign of Zimri-Lim (c. 1775–1761), where they were attested in the vicinity of Terqa (modern-day Tell Ashara, Syria). They were also utilized as couriers by Hammurabi (c. 1792–1750 BC). Following the Fall of Mari, the region was controlled by the Kingdom of Ḫana.

==== Amarna letters ====
Suteans are mentioned in 8 preserved tablets of the Amarna letters, which were written in the middle of the 14th century BC. Amarna Letter EA 195 mentions Biryawaza of Dimasqu utilizing Suteans and 'Apiru in his troops. This usage is somewhat atypical of the use of ʿApiru and external mercenary forces in the Amarna documents, since this letter quotes them and the Suteans as necessary and beneficial to Biryawaza's efforts.

They are also listed in documents from the Middle Assyrian Empire (1395-1075 BC) as being extant in the Amorite city of Emar, in what is now northeast Syria.

=== Iron Age ===
Suteans persist in the Iron Age (c. 1150–950 BC), and some Suteans seem to have partook in West Semitic movement into southern Mesopotamia alongside Chaldean, Aramean and Arab tribes. They reportedly occupied the region of Yadburu bordering Elam and the Persian Gulf, and many Suteans served as auxiliaries for the Elamite king Humban-nikash (r. 653–652 BCE). They also seem to have partook in Chaldean and Aramaean rebellions against the Neo-Assyrian Empire. When Sargon II besieged Dūr-Yakin and killed off its "Ahlamaean" inhabitants, the Suteans were fighting alongside the Aramaean Marsanu and Puqudu tribes.

There I sent my warriors flying like eagles over these canals, and they defeated him. They dyed the water of his canals red like nabasu wool. The Suteans, his allies who took his side and came to his aid, I slaughtered along with the Marsanu like sheep [...]

In 613 BCE, Babylonian king Nabopolassar led an expedition against the inhabitants of Suhum who rebelled against Babylon.

== Language ==
The Sutean language has not been attested in any written texts, but appears to have been Semitic. This is known through individual names and tribal onomastics, most of which appear to be Akkadian and Amorite, while a small percentage appear to be neither but still belonging to a Semitic language. According to Wolfgang Heimpel, the Suteans may have spoken a language close to the later Aramaic or even Arabic.

== See also ==
- Amorites
- Shasu
- Shutu
