= Ahlamu =

Group or designation of Semitic semi-nomads west of the Euphrates

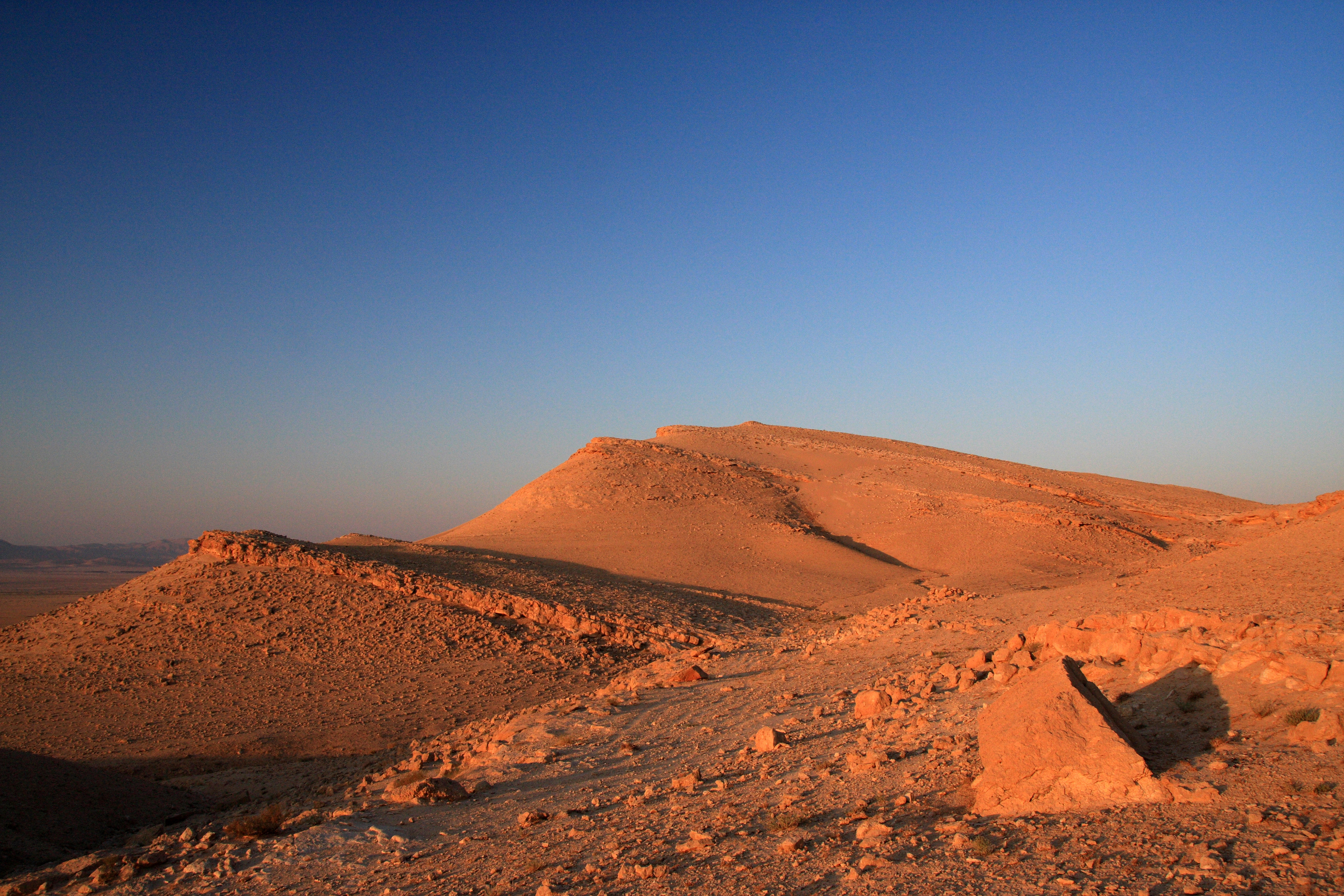
Syrian Desert, where Ahlamu nomads were active

The Ahlamu, or Aḫlamū, were a group or designation of Semitic semi-nomads. Their habitat was west of the Euphrates between the mouth of the Khabur and Palmyra.

They were first mentioned in sources of Rîm-Anum, a king of Uruk, and then in texts from Mari, and finally in the 14th century BC in Egyptian sources in one of the Amarna letters in the days of Akhenaten in which it is affirmed that the Ahlamu had advanced to the Euphrates River.

== Etymology ==
Although the etymology and the meaning are ultimately uncertain, it can safely be said to derive from a Semitic language. It was once proposed as "companion or confederate" by an error of the scholar Wayne T. Pitard, comparing it to an unrelated Semitic root in Arabic, presumably ḥlf ح ل ف, which indeed means such. The more recent proposal by Edward Lipiński, connects it instead to ġlm غ ل م, denoting a boy, lad, post-pubescent youth, a young man, a man full of virility or prowess, the prime of his life, full of testosterone, wild or lusty. The sense of puberty and hitting sexual, as well as physical maturity, can be found in the variant ḥlm ح ل م. He further compares the word form as a broken plural pattern that is found commonly in Arabic: bands of wild young men.

There is also a scholarly debate as to whether this term is a proper name for a group or instead a designation of a type of group. The significance comes in identifying possible genealogical backgrounds and connections of some groups that are given the appellation, such as the Arameans and even some tribes that had elsewhere been called Amorites. That would imply either sub-tribes of an overarching "Aḫlamite" people or, rather, as separate, distinct peoples identified as such by a similar lifestyle. That would be a nomadic designation of the roaming raiding forces that made forays and razzias to capture flocks, slaves, and food supplies from the desert regions south and west of Mesopotamia.

== History ==
In part, the Ahlamu certainly meant the Amorites. One of the tribes of the Ahlamu were the Arameans, who often acted together with the Suteans. The Ahlamu raided in the Persian Gulf and may have disrupted or interrupted trading in Dilmun.

In one of his inscriptions, Assyrian king Adad-nirari II states that his father, Ashur-dan II, defeated different peoples of the mountains including Ahlamu nomads. According to the inscription of another Assyrian king, Shalmaneser I, the Ahlamu with the Mitannian support of Shattuara II of Hanigalbat were defeated in their uprising against the Assyrians.

The Ahlamu even obstructed communication between kingdoms, as was mentioned Babylon King Kadashman-Enlil II in his relations with Hittite King Ḫattušili III in which the former complains about the interruption of sending messengers between the two courts under the pretext of the assaults by Ahlamu bandits. From the 12th century BC, the Mesopotamians increasingly referred to the same mobile groups as "Arameans."

They are also known as enemies of the Assyrians. When Assyria resurfaces again, already in the time of King Ashur-resh-ishi I, he alluded to victories over the Ahlamu and Gutians, as did his successor, Tiglath-Pileser I.

Assyrian King Arik-den-ili turned westward into the Levant (now Syria and Lebanon), where he managed to subjugate the Suteans, the Ahlamu, and the Yauru, in the region of Katmuḫi, in the middle Euphrates.

Tiglath-Pileser III mentioned in his royal inscriptions the Aḫlamu of the land Ulluba, as well as the "LÚ.aḫ-la-am-ak-ka-<di>" (the Aḫlam-Akkadî) . Sargon II wrote that in his war with Marduk-apla-iddina II he built a canal to drown Marduk-apla-iddina's vanguard and "the Aḫlamu, people of the steppe who go at his side", and then spread them out to dry them and filled with them the surroundings of his city. Sennacherib wrote he uprooted all of the Aḫlamu and the Suteans.

== Social life ==
The Ahlamu could fight on their own as they acted as mercenaries with other peoples like the Hittites or the Mitanni. For instance, the Suteans, a prominent Ahlamu group, were prized as capable and fierce warriors and were featured in the Ugaritic texts as such. In addition, because of their excellent knowledge of the Syrian desert steppes, they were sometimes hired as caravan guides or drovers, the same as the nomads Suteans for large commercial expeditions.

== See also ==
- ʿApiru
- Shasu
- Shutu
- Suteans
