= ŠEŠ =

Cuneiform sign

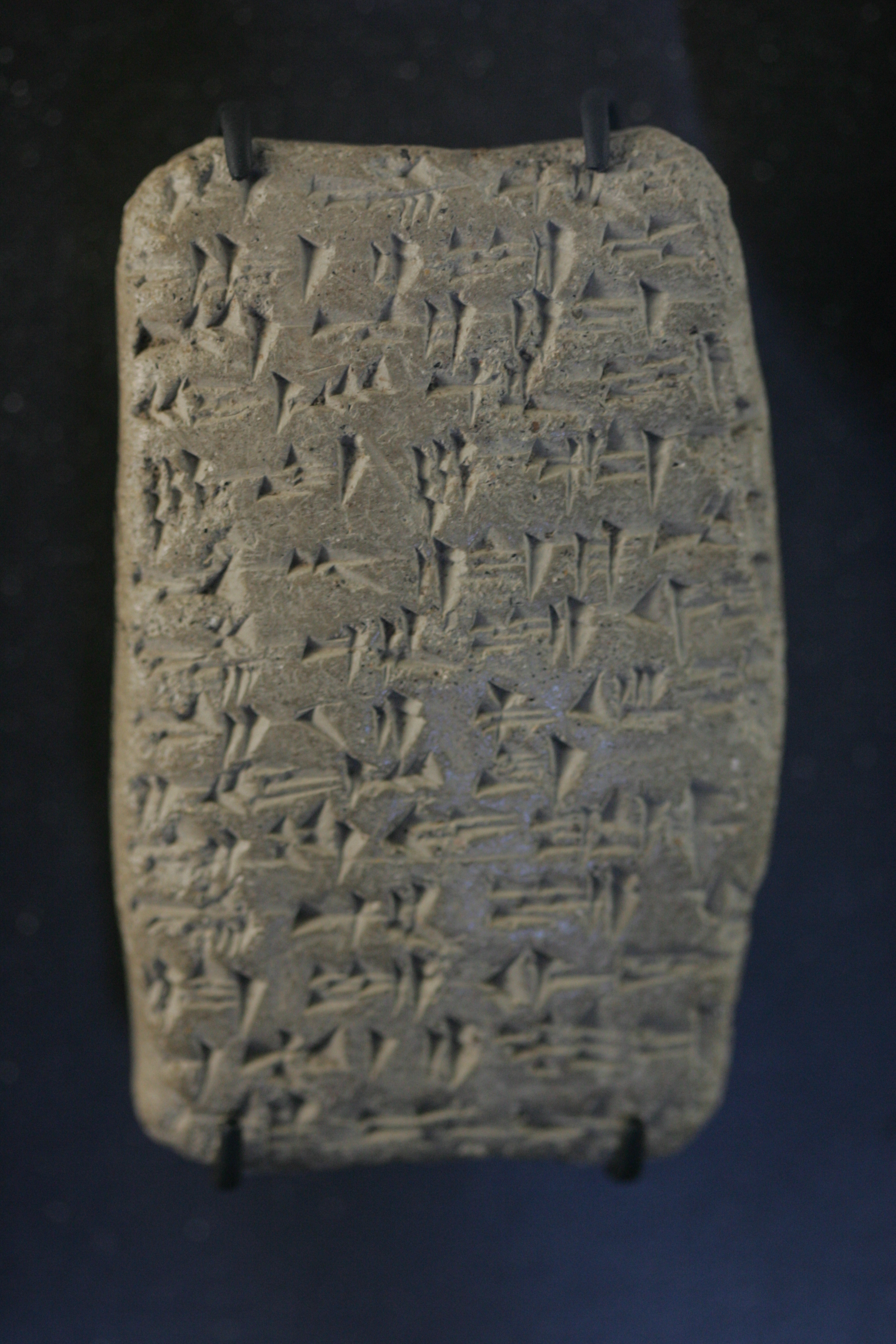
Amarna letter EA 364-(Obverse), Ayyab to Pharaoh, "Justified War". An example, short, vassal state Amarna letter, using instead of "brother", the prostration formula towards the Pharaoh. (high resolution, expandible photo)

The cuneiform ŠEŠ sign, as a capital letter (majuscule), is a Sumerogram for Akkadian language ahu, for "brother". It is the cuneiform sign for ŠEŠ, as it can be used for a variety of lower case syllabic values, using š + vowel + š, (or replacement s+vowel+s). Sumerogram ŠEŠ has a high usage in the mid-14th century BC, ~1350-1330 BC Amarna letters from the brother kingdoms to the Pharaoh's Egypt (Egypt named Mizri in the letters). The brother kingdoms were Babylon, Alashiya, and Mittanni, where King Tushratta authored 13 El Amarna letters.

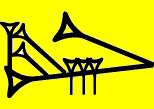

The Sumerogram ŠEŠ, and its syllabic uses (sis through šiš) are also found in the Epic of Gilgamesh, with usage numbers as follows: sis-(3 time), šes-(6), šeš-(3), šiš-(1), ŠEŠ-(6).

As an example of the high usage of sumerogramic use in the Amarna letters, Amarna letter EA 19 from Tushratta, for 13 paragraphs averages about three uses per paragraph, 40 uses of ŠEŠ in the entire letter. For letter EA 35 from the King of Alashiya, for a total of thirteen paragraphs, the Sumerogram is used 27 times.

== Construction of the sign ==
The ŠEŠ sign is constructed by the addition of two wedges (an upper wedge positioned above a lower wedge), at the end of the cuneiform sign for "man", LÚ (man Sumerogram).
