= Ammi-Saduqa =

First Dynasty king of Babylon

Ammī-ṣaduqa
- Title: King of Babylon
- Term: 21 years; 1646–1626 BC (MC); 1638–1618 BC (LMC)
- Predecessor: Ammī-ditāna
- Successor: Samsu-ditāna
- Children: Samsu-ditāna

Ammī-ṣaduqa (sometimes spelled Ammisaduqa, Ammizaduga) was a king of the First Dynasty of Babylon, who ruled in 1646–1626 BC (High Middle Chronology) or 1638–1618 BC (Low Middle Chronology).

== Family ==
He was the eldest son and successor of Ammī-ditāna, probably born of Queen Šamuḫtum.

== Reign ==
Some twenty-one year-names survive for his reign, including the first seventeen. The names indicate that these years were fairly peaceful ones for the kingdom of Ammī-ṣaduqa, who was primarily engaged in enriching and enlarging the temples, and a few other building projects, such as building a wall at the mouth of the Euphrates in his eleventh regnal year.

== Death ==
On his death, Ammī-ṣaduqa was succeeded by his son, Samsu-ditāna, the last king of the Amorite dynasty. Another son of Ammī-ṣaduqa might have been Sîn-ibnīšu.

== See also ==
- Kings of Babylon
- Venus tablets of Ammisaduqa

Regnal titles
Preceded by Ammi-Ditana	King of Babylon; 1646–1626 BC	Succeeded by Samsu-Ditana
