= Ammi-Ditana =

Ancient Babylonian king

Ammī-ditāna
- Title: King of Babylon
- Term: 37 years; 1683–1647 BC (MC); 1675–1639 BC (LMC)
- Predecessor: Abī-ešuḫ
- Successor: Ammī-ṣaduqa
- Spouse: Šamuḫtum (probably)
- Children: Ammī-ṣaduqa, etc.

Ammī-ditāna was a king of Babylon who reigned 1683–1647 BC (according to the Middle Chronology; or 1675–1639 BC according to the Lower Middle Chronology). He was the son and successor of Abī-ešuḫ.

Year-names survive for the first 37 years of his reign, plus fragments for a few possible additional years. His reign was a largely peaceful one; he was primarily engaged in enriching and enlarging the temples, and a few other building projects, although in his 37th regnal year he recorded having destroyed the city wall of Der, built earlier by King Dāmiq-ilišu of Isin.

Ammī-ditāna was succeeded by his eldest son Ammī-ṣaduqa.

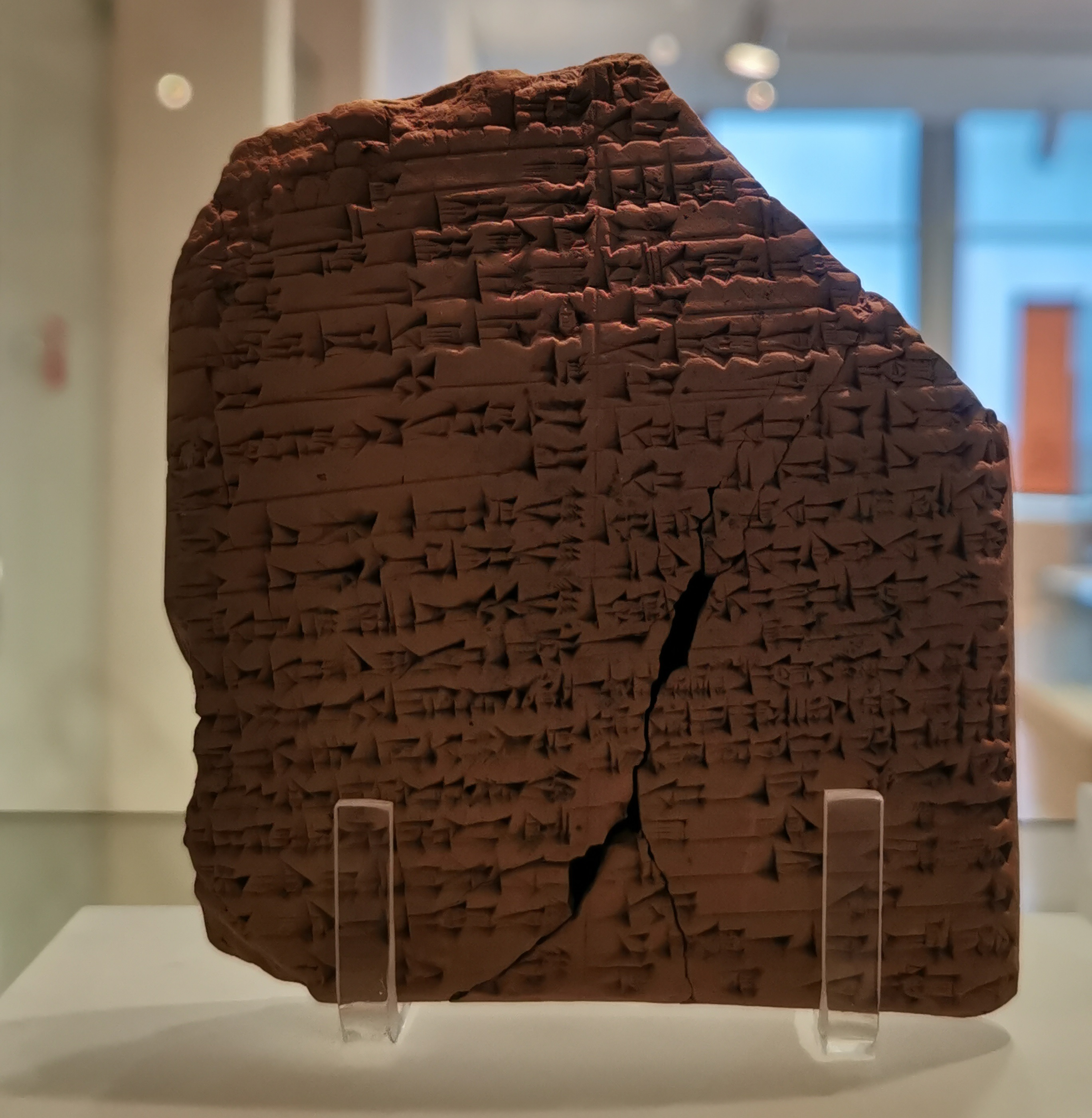
Tablet related to the king Ammi Ditana in the Hecht Museum.

== Family ==
The wife of Ammī-ditāna and mother of his successor was possibly named Šamuḫtum. At least three children of the king are attested:

- Ammī-ṣaduqa, the eldest son and his father’s successor (possibly by Šamuḫtum)
- Šumum-libši
- Unnamed female, married at the behest of her brother Šumum-libši
- Iltani, devotee (nadītum) of Šamaš, a possible daughter
- Elmēšum, a possible daughter
- Annabum, a possible daughter

== Literature ==
Ammī-ditāna is known for his association with literary works. One work is called Ammī-ditāna's hymn to Ištar. Another work is Di 1353, a letter to chief lamentation priest of Annunītum on the provision of fodder barley for livestock in Nakkamtum.

Preceded by Abi-Eshuh	Kings of Babylon; 1683–1647 BC	Succeeded by Ammi-Saduqa
