= Fertile Crescent =

Region of the Middle East

Coordinates: 36°N 40°E

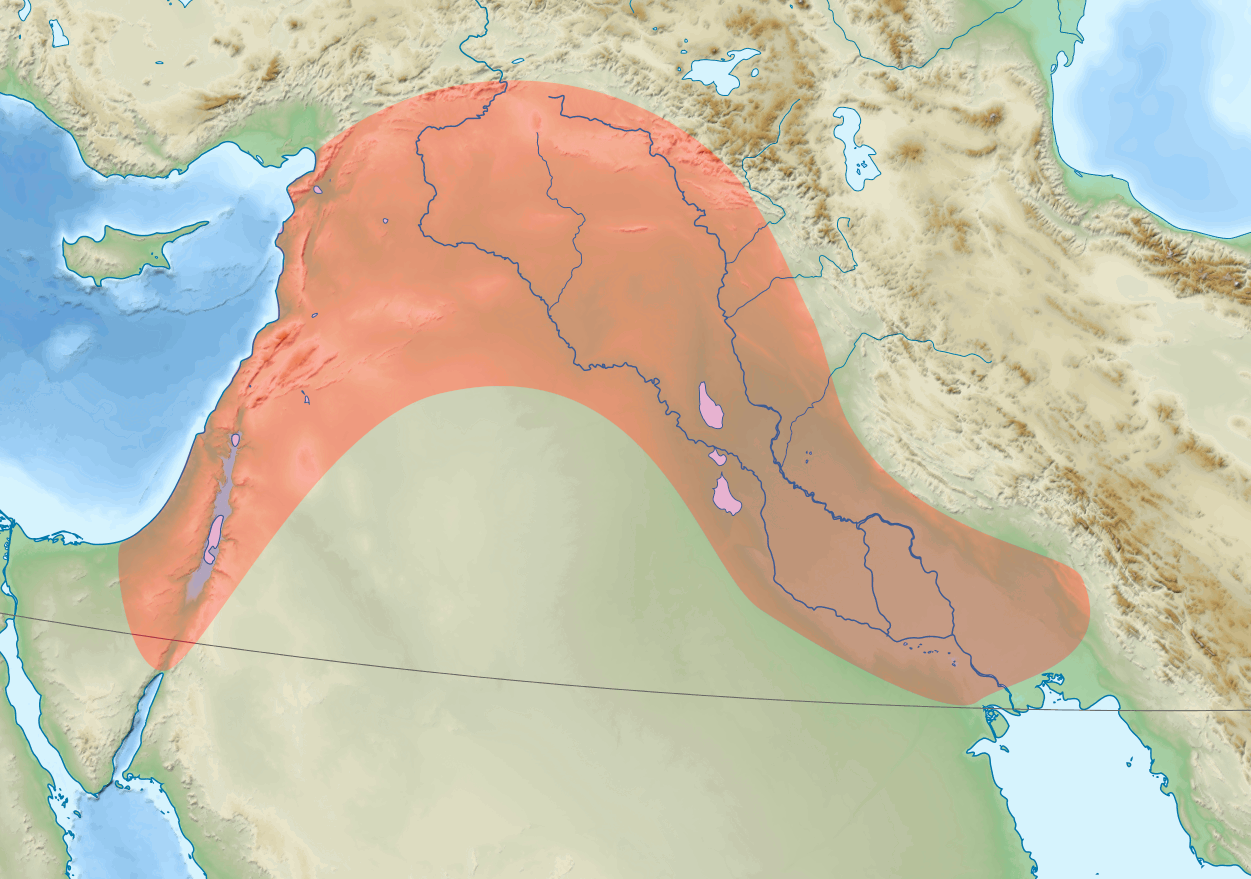
Map of the Fertile Crescent

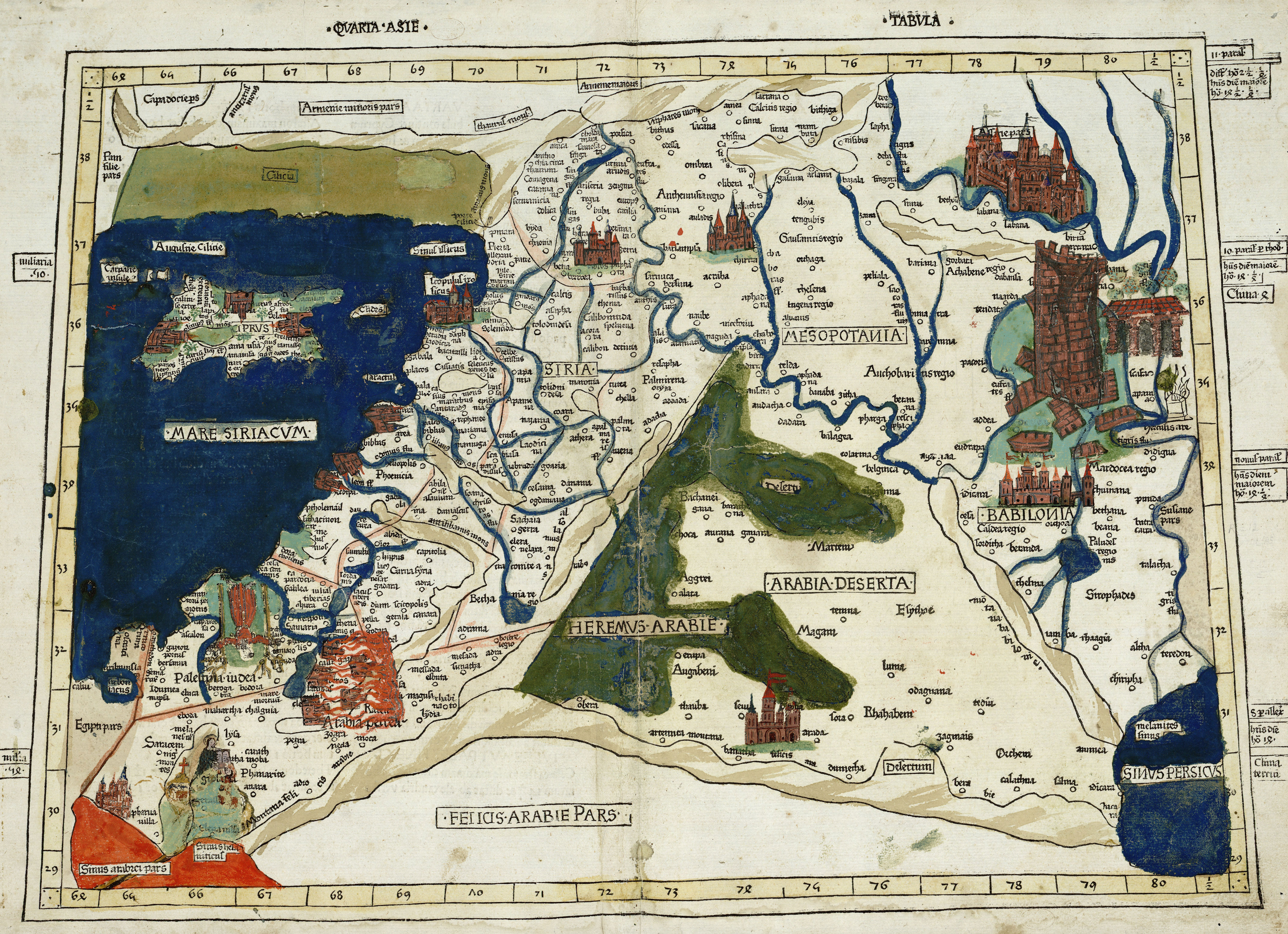
A 15th century copy of Ptolemy's fourth Asian map, depicting the area known as the Fertile Crescent

The Fertile Crescent (Arabic: الهلال الخصيب, al-hilāl al-ḵhaṣīb) is a crescent-shaped region in the Middle East, spanning modern-day Iraq, Israel, Jordan, Lebanon, Palestine, and Syria, together with northern Kuwait, south-eastern Turkey, and western Iran. Some authors also include Cyprus and northern Egypt.

The Fertile Crescent is believed to be the first region where settled farming emerged as people started the process of clearance and modification of natural vegetation to grow newly domesticated plants as crops. Early human civilizations such as Sumer in Mesopotamia flourished as a result. Technological advances in the region include the development of agriculture and the use of irrigation, of writing, the wheel, and glass, most emerging first in Mesopotamia.

== Terminology ==
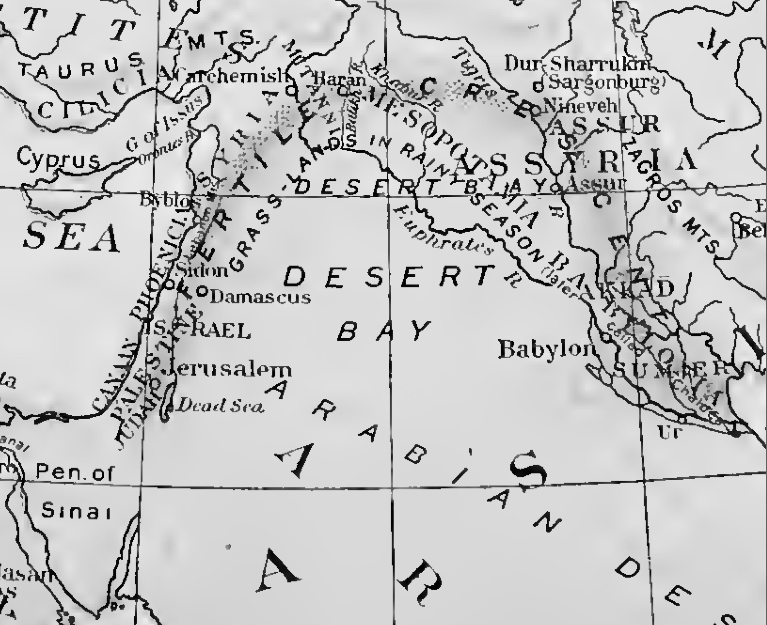
1916 map of the Fertile Crescent by James H. Breasted, who popularised usage of the phrase.

The term "Fertile Crescent" was popularized by archaeologist James Henry Breasted in Outlines of European History (1914) and Ancient Times, A History of the Early World (1916). He wrote:

It lies like an army facing south, with one wing stretching along the eastern shore of the Mediterranean and the other reaching out to the Persian Gulf, while the center has its back against the northern mountains. The end of the western wing is Palestine; Assyria makes up a large part of the center; while the end of the eastern wing is Babylonia. [...] This great semicircle, for lack of a name, may be called the Fertile Crescent.

There is no single term for this region in antiquity. Historian Thomas Scheffler has noted that Breasted was following a trend in Western geography to "overwrite the classical geographical distinctions between continents, countries and landscapes with large, abstract spaces", drawing parallels with the work of Halford Mackinder, who conceptualised Eurasia as a 'pivot area' surrounded by an 'inner crescent', Alfred Thayer Mahan's Middle East, and Friedrich Naumann's Mitteleuropa.

In current usage, the Fertile Crescent includes Israel, Palestine, Iraq, Syria, Lebanon, Egypt, and Jordan, as well as the surrounding portions of Turkey and Iran. In addition to the Tigris and Euphrates, riverwater sources include the Jordan River. The boundaries are delimited by the dry climate of the Syrian Desert to the south, the Sahara Desert to the west, the Anatolian and Armenian highlands to the north and the Iranian plateau to the east.

== Biodiversity and climate ==
Area of the fertile crescent, c. 7500 BCE, with main sites of the Pre-Pottery Neolithic period. The area of Mesopotamia proper was not yet settled by humans. Includes Göbekli Tepe, a site in modern-day Turkey that is dated circa 9000 BCE.

As crucial as rivers and marshlands were to the rise of civilization in the Fertile Crescent, they were not the only factor. The area is geographically important as the "bridge" between North Africa and Eurasia, which has allowed it to retain a greater amount of biodiversity than either Europe or North Africa, where climate changes during the Ice Age led to repeated extinction events when ecosystems became squeezed against the waters of the Mediterranean Sea. The Saharan pump theory posits that this Middle Eastern land bridge was extremely important to the modern distribution of Old World flora and fauna, including the spread of humanity.

The area has borne the brunt of the tectonic divergence between the African and Arabian plates and the converging Arabian and Eurasian plates, which has made the region a very diverse zone of high snow-covered mountains.

The Fertile Crescent had many diverse climates, and major climatic changes encouraged the evolution of many "r" type annual plants, which produce more edible seeds than "K" type perennial plants. The region's dramatic variety in elevation gave rise to many species of edible plants for early experiments in cultivation. Most importantly, the Fertile Crescent was home to the eight Neolithic founder crops important in early agriculture (i.e., wild progenitors to emmer wheat, einkorn, barley, flax, chick pea, pea, lentil, bitter vetch), and four of the five most important species of domesticated animals—cows, goats, sheep, and pigs; the fifth species, the horse, lived nearby. The Fertile Crescent flora comprises a high percentage of plants that can self-pollinate, but may also be cross-pollinated. These plants, called "selfers", were one of the geographical advantages of the area because they did not depend on other plants for reproduction.

== History ==
As well as possessing many sites with the skeletal and cultural remains of both pre-modern and early modern humans (e.g., at Tabun and Es Skhul caves), later Pleistocene hunter-gatherers, and Epipalaeolithic semi-sedentary hunter-gatherers (the Natufians); the Fertile Crescent is most famous for its sites related to the origins of agriculture. The western zone around the Jordan and upper Euphrates rivers gave rise to the first known Neolithic farming settlements (referred to as Pre-Pottery Neolithic A (PPNA)), which date to around 9,000 BCE and includes very ancient sites such as Göbekli Tepe, Chogha Golan, and Jericho (Tell es-Sultan).

Map of the ancient Fertile Crescent

This region, alongside Mesopotamia (Greek for "between rivers", between the rivers Tigris and Euphrates, lies in the east of the Fertile Crescent), also saw the emergence of early complex societies during the succeeding Bronze Age. There is also early evidence from the region for writing and the formation of hierarchical state level societies. This has earned the region the nickname "The cradle of civilization".

From ancient times empires arose and fell in the Tigris–Euphrates river basin, including Sumer, Akkad, Assyria, and Babylonia, .

It is in this region where the first libraries appeared about 4,500 years ago. The oldest known libraries are found in Nippur (in Sumer) and Ebla (in Syria), both from c. 2500 BCE.

Both the Tigris and Euphrates start in the Taurus Mountains of what is modern-day Turkey. Farmers in southern Mesopotamia had to protect their fields from flooding each year. Northern Mesopotamia had sufficient rain to make some farming possible. To protect against flooding they made levees.

Since the Bronze Age, the region's natural fertility has been greatly extended by irrigation works, upon which much of its agricultural production continues to depend. The last two millennia have seen repeated cycles of decline and recovery as past works have fallen into disrepair through the replacement of states, to be replaced under their successors. Another ongoing problem has been salination—gradual concentration of salt and other minerals in soils with a long history of irrigation.

=== Early domestications ===
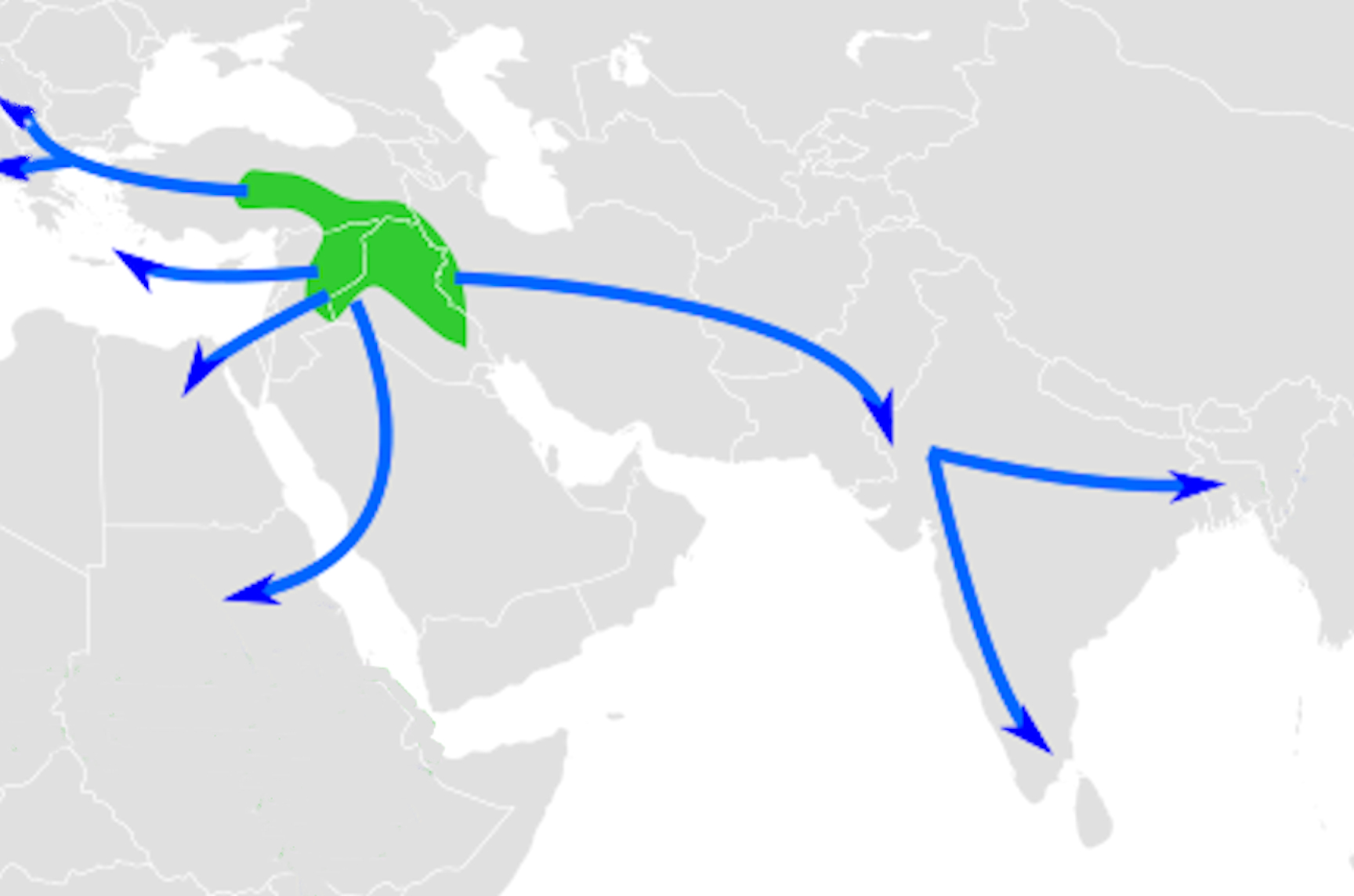
Diffusion of agriculture from the Fertile Crescent after 9000 BCE

Prehistoric seedless figs were discovered at Gilgal I in the Jordan Valley, suggesting that fig trees were being planted some 11,400 years ago. Cereals were already grown in Syria as long as 9,000 years ago. Small cats (Felis silvestris) also were domesticated in this region. Also, legumes including peas, lentils and chickpea were domesticated in this region.

Domesticated animals include the cattle, sheep, goat, domestic pig, cat, and domestic goose.

== Cosmopolitan diffusion ==
Maunsell's map, a Pre-World War I British Ethnographical Map of the Fertile Crescent area

Modern analyses comparing 24 craniofacial measurements reveal a relatively diverse population within the pre-Neolithic, Neolithic and Bronze Age Fertile Crescent, supporting the view that several populations occupied this region during these time periods. Similar arguments do not hold true for the Basques and Canary Islanders of the same time period, as the studies demonstrate those ancient peoples to be "clearly associated with modern Europeans". Additionally, no evidence from the studies demonstrates Cro-Magnon influence, contrary to former suggestions.

The studies further suggest a diffusion of this diverse population away from the Fertile Crescent, with the early migrants moving away from the Near East—westward into Europe and North Africa, northward to Crimea, and northeastward to Mongolia. They took their agricultural practices with them and interbred with the hunter-gatherers whom they subsequently came in contact with while perpetuating their farming practices. This supports prior genetic and archaeological studies which have all arrived at the same conclusion.

Consequently, contemporary in situ peoples absorbed the agricultural way of life of those early migrants who ventured out of the Fertile Crescent. This is contrary to the suggestion that the spread of agriculture disseminated out of the Fertile Crescent by way of sharing of knowledge. Instead, the view now supported by a preponderance of evidence is that it occurred by actual migration out of the region, coupled with subsequent interbreeding with indigenous local populations whom the migrants came in contact with.

A 2005 craniometric study found that not all present-day Europeans share strong affinities to the Neolithic and Bronze Age inhabitants of the Fertile Crescent; the closest ties to the Fertile Crescent rest with Southern Europeans. The same study further demonstrates all present-day Europeans to be closely related. Genetics research finds that most present-day Europeans, across Europe, derive from at least three ancient populations, including the Early European Farmers, who descended from the Near Eastern migrants that brought agriculture to Europe. This ancient farmer population was genetically distinct from European hunter-gatherers and close to present-day Near Easterners.

== Languages ==
Linguistically, the Fertile Crescent was a region of great diversity. Historically, Semitic languages generally prevailed in the modern regions of Iraq, Syria, Jordan, Lebanon, Israel, Palestine, Sinai and the fringes of southeast Turkey and northwest Iran, as well as the Sumerian (a language isolate) in Iraq, whilst in the mountainous areas to the east and north a number of generally unrelated language isolates were found, including; Elamite, Gutian and Kassite in Iran, and Hattic, Kaskian and Hurro-Urartian in Turkey. The precise affiliation of these, and their date of arrival, remain topics of scholarly discussion. However, given lack of textual evidence for the earliest era of prehistory, this debate is unlikely to be resolved in the near future.

The evidence that does exist suggests that, by the third millennium BCE and into the second, several language groups already existed in the region. These included:

- Proto-Euphratean language: a hypothetical non-Semitic language previously hypothesized to be the substratum language of the people that introduced farming into Southern Iraq in the Early Ubaid period. (5300–4700 BCE) The linguistic consensus today is that multiple unknown substrata contributed to the formation of the artifacts in Sumerian names that motivated the Proto-Euphratean substrate hypothesis, including fossilized archaic elements from earlier stages of Sumerian itself.
- Sumerian: a non-Semitic language isolate that displays a Sprachbund-type relationship with neighbouring Semitic Akkadian
- Elamite language: a non-Semitic language isolate
- Semitic languages: Akkadian (aka Assyrian and Babylonian), Eblaite, Amorite, Aramaic, Ugaritic, Canaanite languages (including Hebrew, Moabite, Edomite, Phoenician/Carthaginian)
- Hattic: a language isolate, spoken originally in central Anatolia
- Indo-European languages: generally believed to be later intrusive languages arriving after 2000 BCE, such as Hittite, Luwian and the Indo-Aryan material attested in the Mitanni civilization, but recent evidence suggests that the language family emerged from the Fertile Crescent as early as 6000 BCE
- Egyptian: a stand-alone branch of the Afroasiatic languages confined to Egypt
- Hurro-Urartian languages, a small family. The Kassite language spoken in the northern part of the region may have belonged to this family.

Links between Hurro-Urartian and Hattic and the indigenous languages of the Caucasus have frequently been suggested, but are not generally accepted.

== See also ==
- Beth Nahrain – Areas between and surrounding the Euphrates and Tigris rivers
- Hilly Flanks – Area around the Fertile Crescent of West Asia
- History of agriculture
- History of Mesopotamia
- Hydraulic empire – Government by control of access to water
- Fertile Crescent Plan
- Syria (region)

== Bibliography ==
- Jared Diamond, Guns, Germs and Steel: A Short History of Everybody for the Last 13,000 Years, 1997.
- Anderson, Clifford Norman. The Fertile Crescent: Travels In the Footsteps of Ancient Science. 2d ed., rev. Fort Lauderdale: Sylvester Press, 1972.
- Deckers, Katleen. Holocene Landscapes Through Time In the Fertile Crescent. Turnhout: Brepols, 2011.
- Ephʻal, Israel. The Ancient Arabs: Nomads On the Borders of the Fertile Crescent 9th–5th Centuries B.C. Jerusalem: Magnes Press, 1982.
- Kajzer, Małgorzata, Łukasz Miszk, and Maciej Wacławik. The Land of Fertility I: South-East Mediterranean Since the Bronze Age to the Muslim Conquest. Newcastle upon Tyne, UK: Cambridge Scholars Publishing, 2016.
- Kozłowski, Stefan Karol. The Eastern Wing of the Fertile Crescent: Late Prehistory of Greater Mesopotamian Lithic Industries. Oxford: Archaeopress, 1999.
- Potts, Daniel T. (21 May 2012). Potts, D. T (ed.). A Companion to the Archaeology of the Ancient Near East. Vol. 1. John Wiley & Sons. p. 1445. doi:10.1002/9781444360790. ISBN 978-1-4051-8988-0.
- Steadman, Sharon R.; McMahon, Gregory (15 September 2011). The Oxford Handbook of Ancient Anatolia: (10,000-323 BCE). OUP. p. 1174. ISBN 978-0-19-537614-2.
- Thomas, Alexander R. The Evolution of the Ancient City: Urban Theory and the Archaeology of the Fertile Crescent. Lanham: Lexington Books/Rowman & Littlefield Publishers, 2010.
