= Alarodian languages =

Proposed language family

Alarodian
- (controversial)
- Geographic distribution: Caucasus, Anatolia
- Linguistic classification: Proposed language family
- Subdivisions: Hurro-Urartian †; Northeast Caucasian

Language codes
- Glottolog: None

The Alarodian languages are a proposed language family that encompasses the Northeast Caucasian (Nakh–Dagestanian) languages and the extinct Hurro-Urartian languages.

== History ==
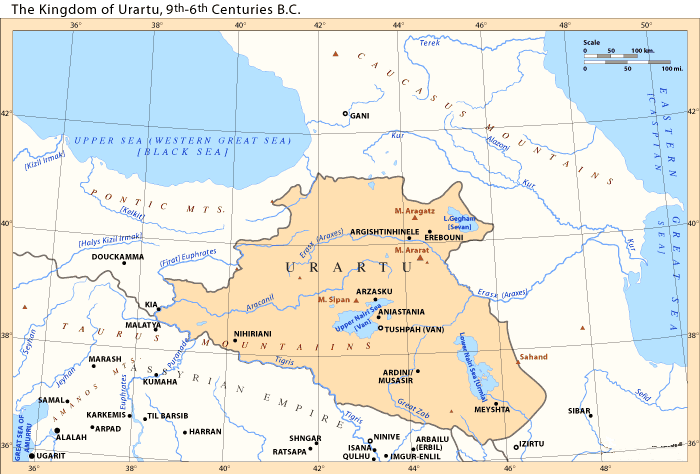
The state of Urartu in the 9th to 6th centuries BCE

The term Alarodian is derived from Greek Ἀλαρόδιοι (Alarodioi), the name of an ethnic group mentioned by Herodotus that has often been equated with the people of the kingdom of Urartu, although this equation is considered doubtful by modern scholars. A leading Urartologist, Paul Zimansky, rejects a connection between the Urartians and the Alarodians. Almost nothing is known about the Alarodians except that they "were armed like the Colchians and Saspeires," according to Herodotus. The Colchians and Saspeires are generally associated with the Kartvelians and/or Scythians, neither of whom spoke a Hurro-Urartian or Northeast Caucasian language.

Historically, the term "Alarodian languages" was employed for several language family proposals of various sizes. Sayce (1880) employed the name for a small group that comprised Urartian (then called "Vannic") and the Kartvelian languages (Georgian, Laz, Mingrelian, and Svan). In 1884, the German orientalist Fritz Hommel further included all languages of the Caucasus and the ancient Near East which did not belong to the Indo-European, Semitic, and the now obsolete Ural–Altaic language families, e.g. Elamite, Kassite. Later, he extended the Alarodian family to include the pre-Indo-European languages of Europe, e.g. Lemnian, Etruscan, Ligurian. Karel Oštir's (1921) version of Alarodian included all aforementioned languages, further Basque, Sumerian, Egyptian, the Cushitic and Berber languages. The historical Alarodian proposal – especially Oštir's maximal extension – was not well-received by the majority of scholars ("Ce petit livre donne le vertige"—"This little book makes one dizzy", A. Meillet), and eventually abandoned.

The distribution of Northeast Caucasian languages in the modern day.

The term "Alarodian languages" was revived by I. M. Diakonoff for the proposed language family that unites the Hurro-Urartian and Northeast Caucasian languages. Work by I. M. Diakonoff and Starostin (1986) asserted the connection between "Nakh-Dagestanian" (NE Caucasian) and Hurro-Urartian on the basis of a comparison of their reconstruction to Proto-Nakh-Dagestanian, later published in 1994 with Nikolayev.

=== Proposed relation to Tyrsenian ===
The inclusion of Etruscan and the related Tyrsenian languages has also been proposed, first by Orel and Starostin in 1990, on the basis of sound correspondences. Facchetti has argued that there is a "curious" set of isoglosses between Etruscan and Hurrian, while Pliev proposed instead that Etruscan had a Nakh substrate. In 2006, Robertson further developed the hypothesis of including Tyrsenian based on proposed Etruscan/Nakh sound correspondences and reconstructions for the numerals.

== Reception ==
The validity of the Alarodian hypothesis remains fairly controversial. Many scholars doubt that the Hurro-Urartian and Northeast Caucasian languages are related, or believe that, while a connection is possible, the evidence is far from conclusive. The Nostraticist Allan R. Bomhard argues instead for a genetic relationship between Hurro-Urartian and Indo-European (most experts exclude a close genetic relationship between Northeast Caucasian and Indo-European, making the two hypotheses probably exclusive). The Caucasian language specialist Johanna Nichols grounds her skepticism about the Alarodian theory in that "neither Diakonoff and Starostin, nor Nikolayev and Starostin, take on the burden of proof and discuss whether the incidence of resemblances exceeds chance expectation, nor do they present examples of the kind of shared morphological paradigmaticity that would strongly support genetic relatedness".

Nevertheless, Petri Kallio, a Uralicist and Indo-Europeanist, argues that from the perspective of what relationships are most likely for Northeast Caucasian, the Alarodian theory is the most promising, more so than the attempts to link Northeast and Northwest Caucasian, let alone attempts to link Northeast Caucasian to Indo-European, Kartvelian, Etruscan, Burushaski, or "Dene-Caucasian". A major obstacle to progress on the question (and any other questions about relationships with or within Northeast Caucasian) is the lack of consensus about the reconstruction of Proto-Northeast Caucasian itself.

== See also ==
- Hurrian language
- Urartian language
- Caucasian Albanian language

== Literature ==
- A. Svanidze. "Materials for history of Alarodian tribes" (a monograph), Tbilisi, 1937 (in Russian)
- G.A. Melikishvili. Questions of the oldest population of Georgia, Caucasus and the Near East (a monograph), Tbilisi, 1965 (in Georgian, Russian summary)
- I. Diakonoff, S. Starostin. "Hurro-Urartian as an Eastern Caucasian Language".- Münchener Studien zur Sprachwissenschaft, Beiheft, N.F., 12, 1986 (in English)
- Alarodian languages.- Encyclopedia "Sakartvelo", vol. I, Tbilisi, 1997, pp. 90 (in Georgian)
