= Mitanni Letter =

Cuneiform tablet

The Mitanni Letter is a term used in historiography to refer to a document written in the Hurrian language by the Mitanni king Tushratta, dating from the first half of the 14th century BCE. The letter was discovered in 1887 in Amarna. Originally, it consisted of 494 lines, but only 466 lines have been preserved either in whole or in fragments. The content of the letter pertains to matters related to the marriage of Tushratta's daughter, Tadukhipa, to Amenhotep III. The Mitanni Letter is one of the primary sources for the analysis of the Hurrian language.

== Research status ==
The document was discovered during excavations at Tell el-Amarna in 1887. Alongside it, archives of the pharaohs Amenhotep III and Akhenaten were found, containing diplomatic correspondence. Several letters originated from Mitanni's King Tushratta. They were written in Akkadian, which was commonly used as the diplomatic language at the time. An exception was a document whose language was initially unidentified, so it was preliminarily referred to as Mitanni – from the name of the state ruled by the author of the letter. The term Hurrian came into use several decades later, after the discovery of documentation from Hattusa, although earlier the language of Tushratta's letter was also suggested to be called Subartian, derived from Subartu – the Babylonian term for Upper Mesopotamia, inhabited by Hurrian peoples. The document itself was named the Mitanni Letter.

Even before the concept of Hurrians entered historiography, the presence of foreign words was noted in Akkadian texts. Friedrich Delitzsch, in his Akkadian synonym list, annotated these words with su(-bir_{4}^{ki}), speculating that they contained a variation of the name of the land of Subartu. The Mitanni Letter was published by Hugo Winckler and Ludwig Abel two years after its discovery. In 1890, Henry Sayce published the results of research on non-Semitic and non-Sumerian proper names and common words found in Akkadian texts in correspondence from Tell el-Amarna and Tunip. He correctly assumed that they bore similarity to the texts of rock inscriptions from Lake Van and probably belonged to the same linguistic group (later this group was named the Hurro-Urartian languages).

The Mitanni Letter was studied by scholars such as Peter Jensen, Rudolph E. Brünnow, Ludwig Messerschmidt, and Ferdinand Bork. Peter Jensen observed that the text contained words identical to those marked with the su(-bir_{4}^{ki}) note from Delitzsch's list. He documented his findings in a work from 1891. Ludwig Messerschmidt in 1899 and Henry Sayce a year later published analyses of one of the Akkadian documents from Tunip, dating from the Amarna period and containing foreign glosses. The researchers noted their similarity to the words marked by Delitzsch and classified them as belonging to the Mitanni language. In 1906, Ferdinand Bork added numerous proper names to this group, discovered in texts from Old and Middle Babylonian periods.

During the study of the Mitanni Letter, most scholars employed a combinatory method. They compared the text to other documents of Tushratta written in Akkadian and found in Tell el-Amarna alongside the Mitanni Letter. All the letters from the Mitanni king followed a consistent pattern, using identical phrases, and addressed similar matters. This facilitated the creation of a quasi-bilingual Akkadian-Hurrian dictionary.

The Mitanni Letter under the designation VAT 422 (EA 24) is housed in the Amarna collection of the Egyptian Museum of Berlin. Since its discovery, depending on the publication, it has been numbered as WA 27, VS 12 or Kn 24. In 1902, the first transcription of the text was published by Jørgen Alexander Knudtzon, with a reissue in 1964. In 1915, Otto Schroeder published the cuneiform autograph of the Mitanni Letter in his work Die Tontafeln von El-Amarna, assigning it the number 200. According to Maciej Popko, the copy made by the researcher is considered the best in the scholarly community, although Johannes Friedrich considered it not very good. In 1932, Johannes Friedrich published a transcription of the letter in his work Kleinasiatische Sprachdenkmäler. In 1982, Gernot Wilhelm included fragments of the letter's translation into German in his publication Grundzüge der Geschichte und Kultur der Hurriter. Ten years later, William L. Moran translated the document into English.

Autography of the Mittani Letter, published by Otto Schroeder in 1915

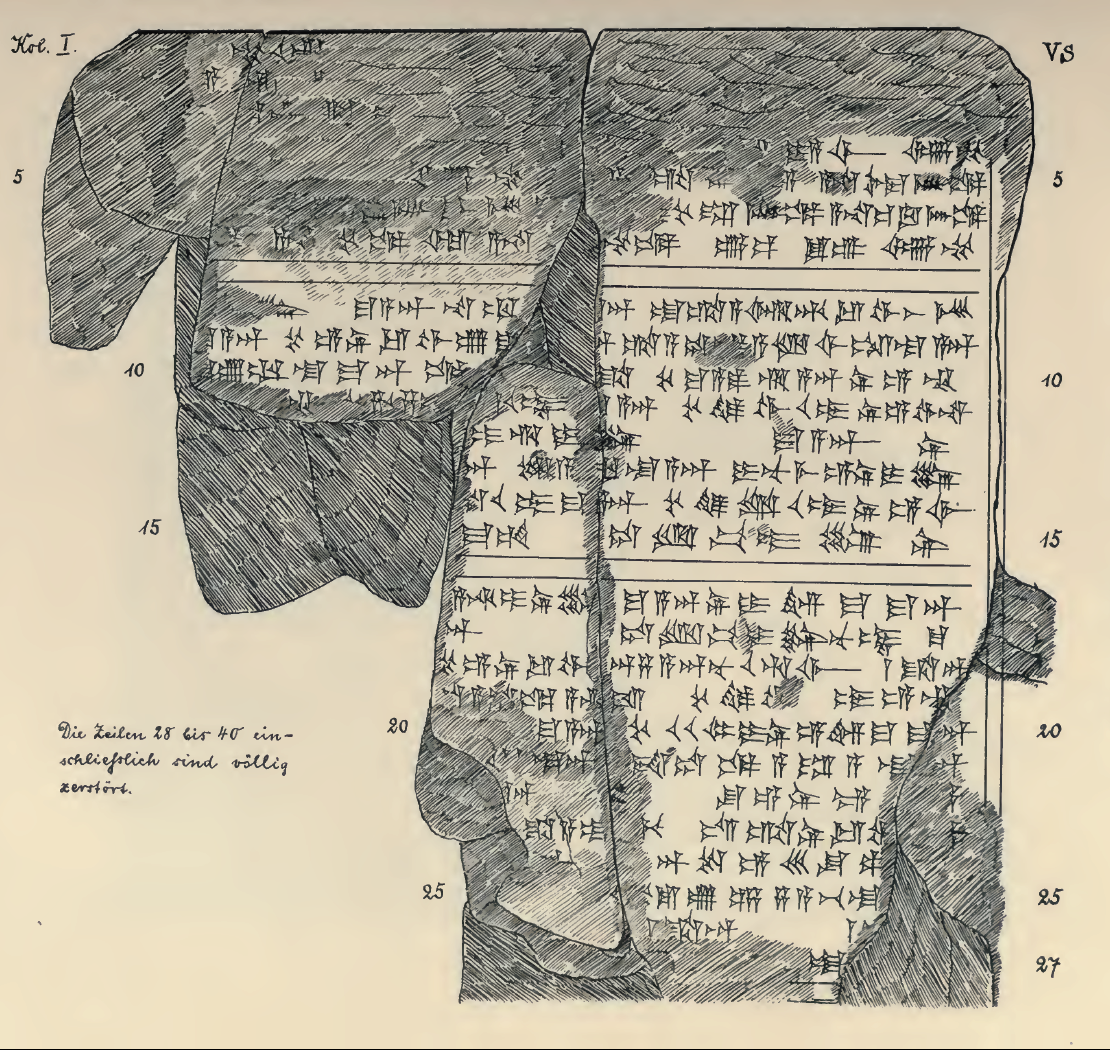
Column I, lines 1–27 (28–40 destroyed)

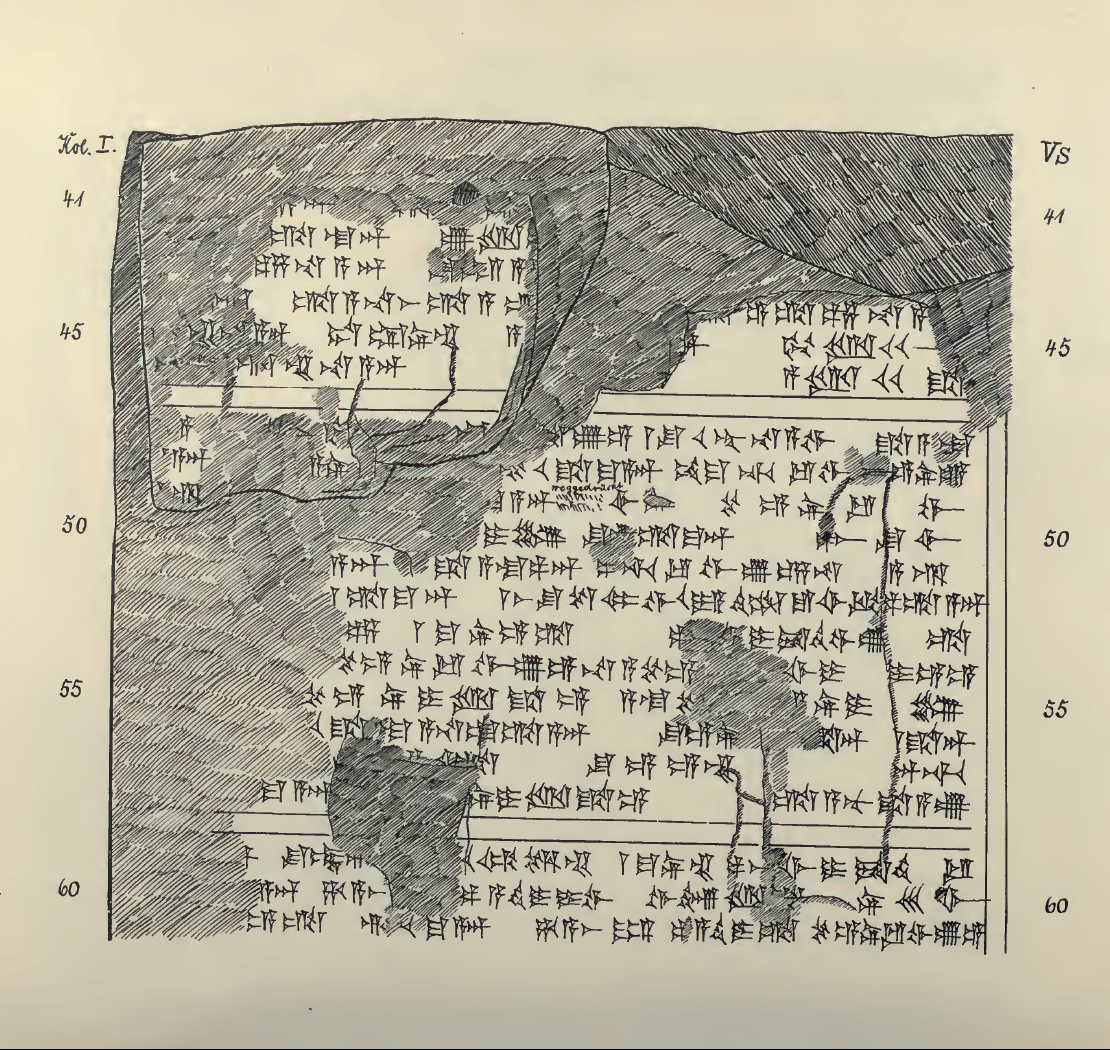
Column I, lines 41–61

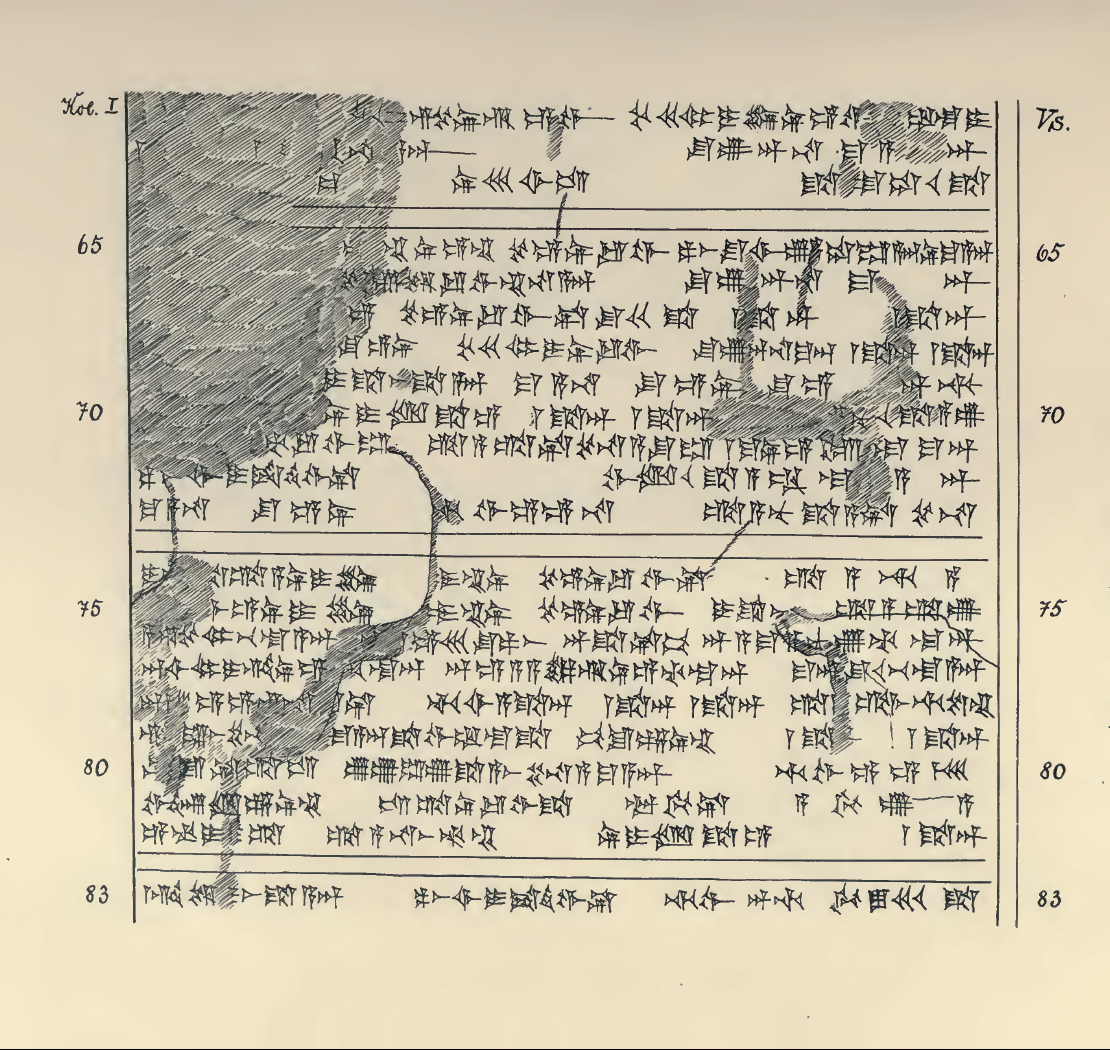
Column I, lines 62–83

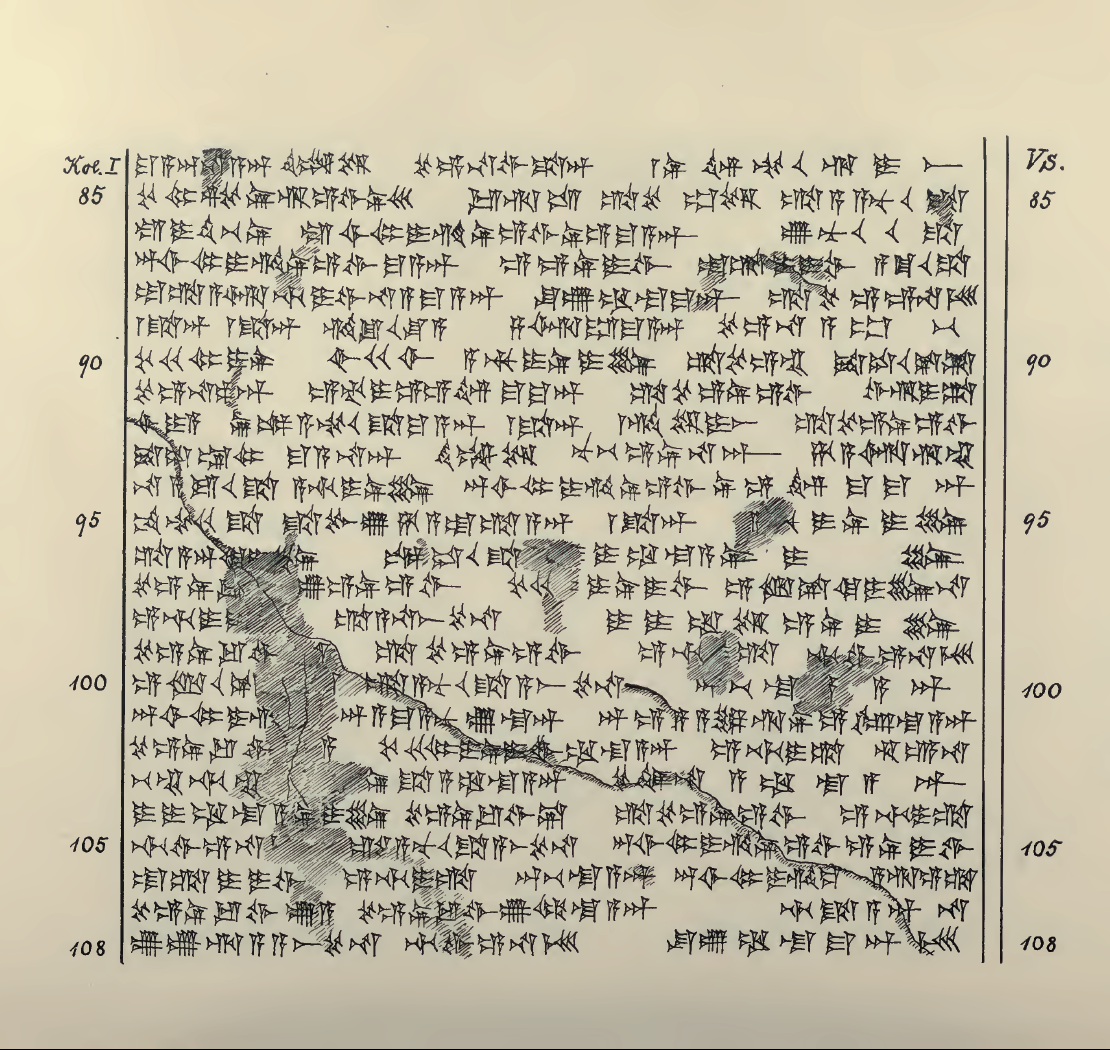
Column I, lines 84–108

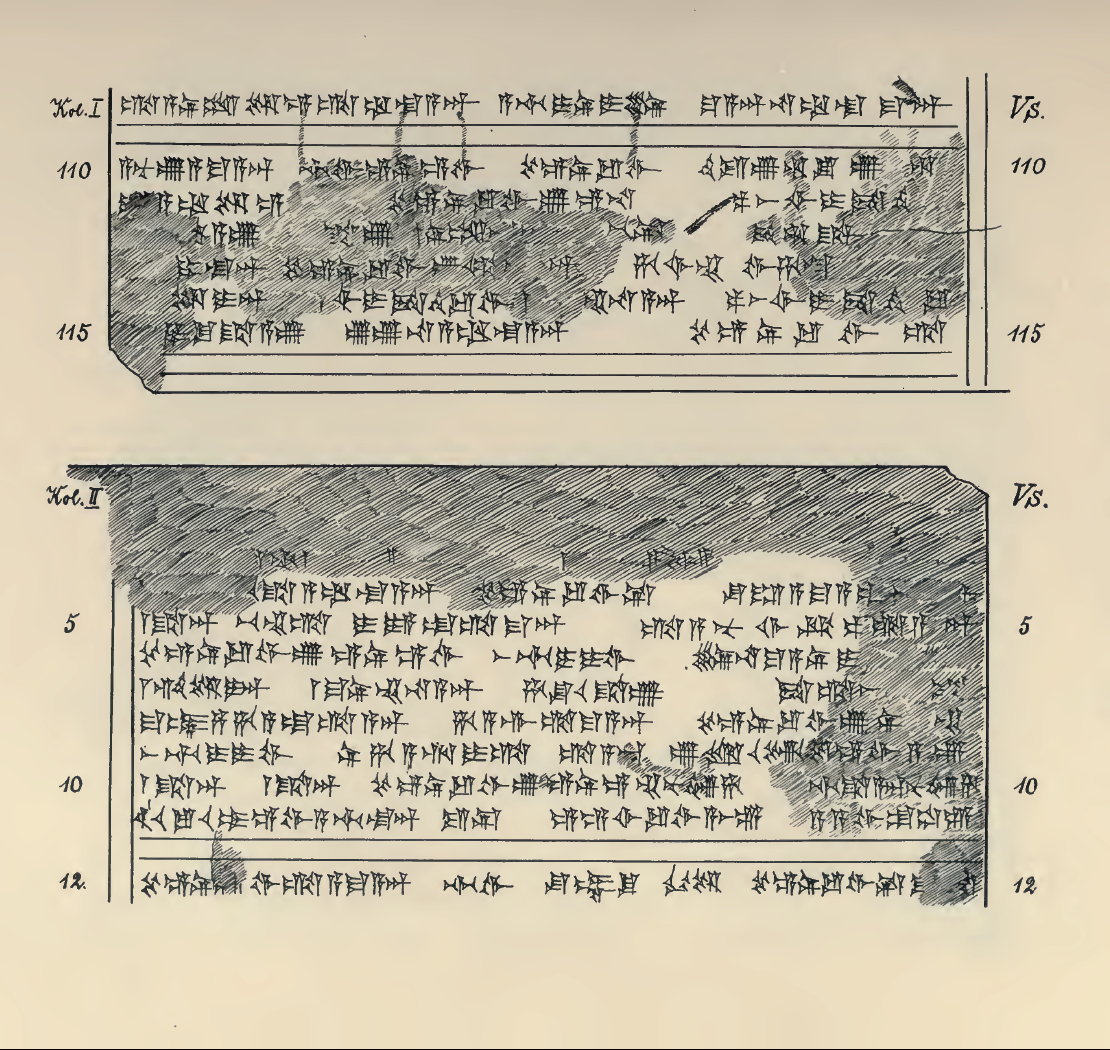
Column I, lines 109–115 and column II, lines 3–12 (1–2 destroyed)

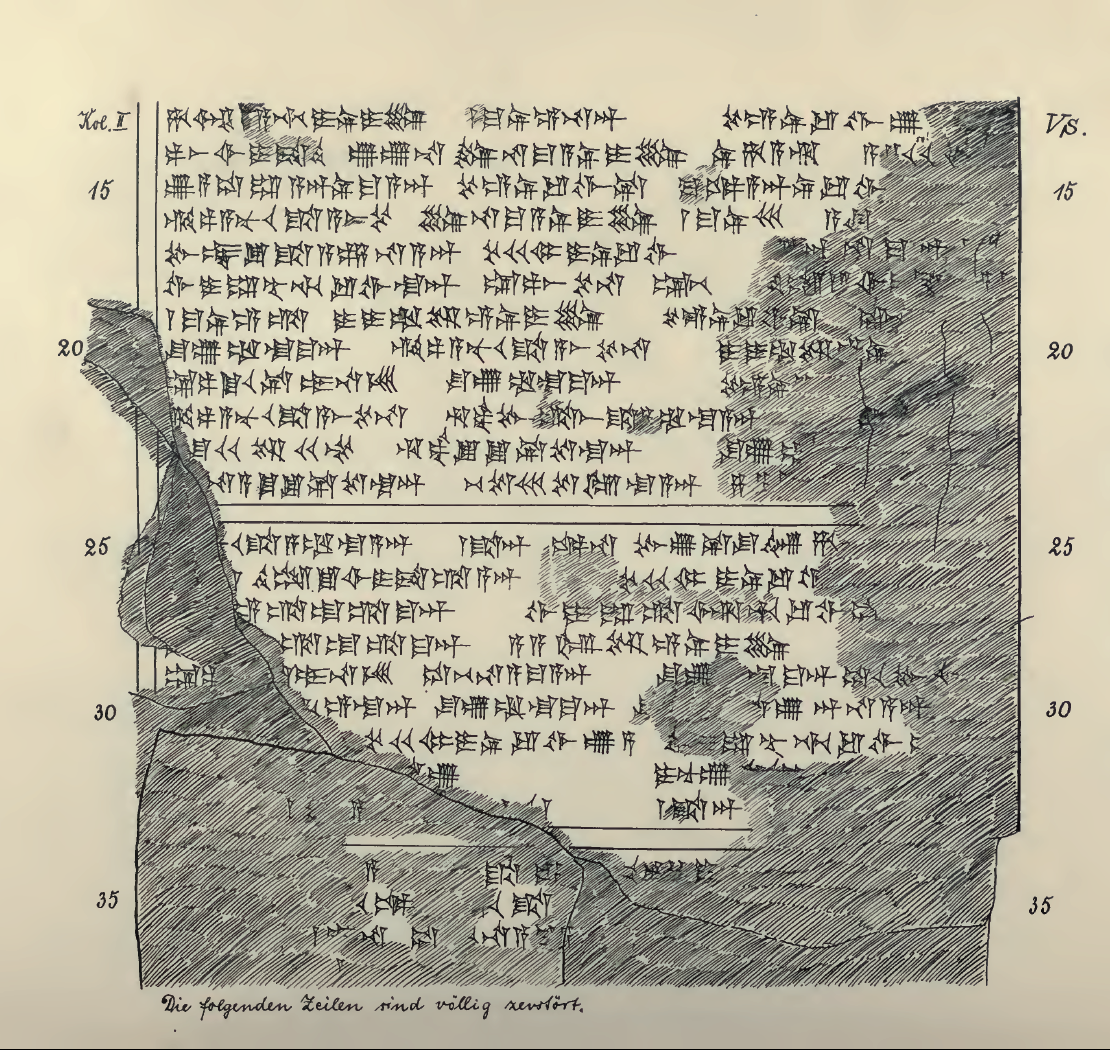
Column II, lines 13–36 (37–48 destroyed)

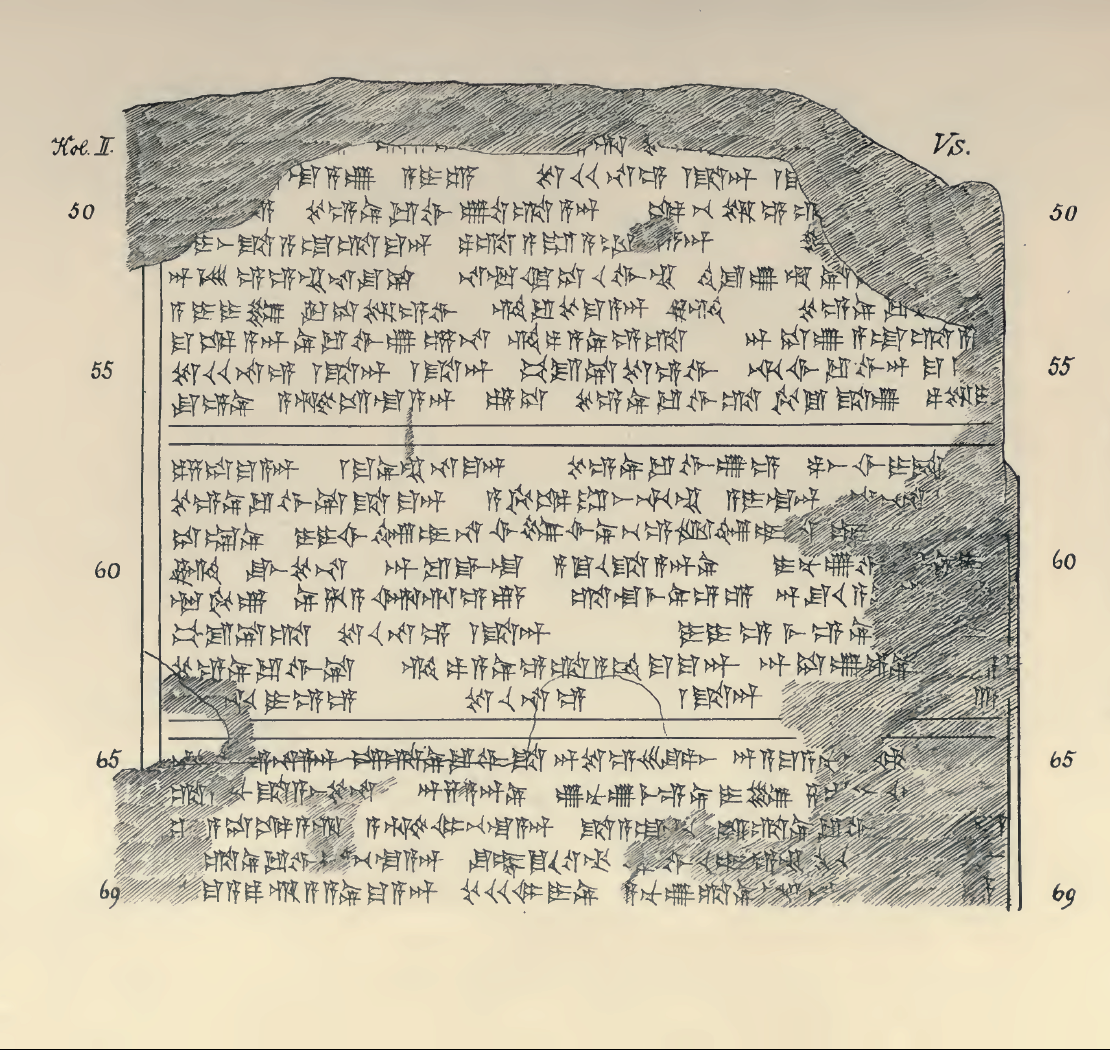
Column II, lines 48–69

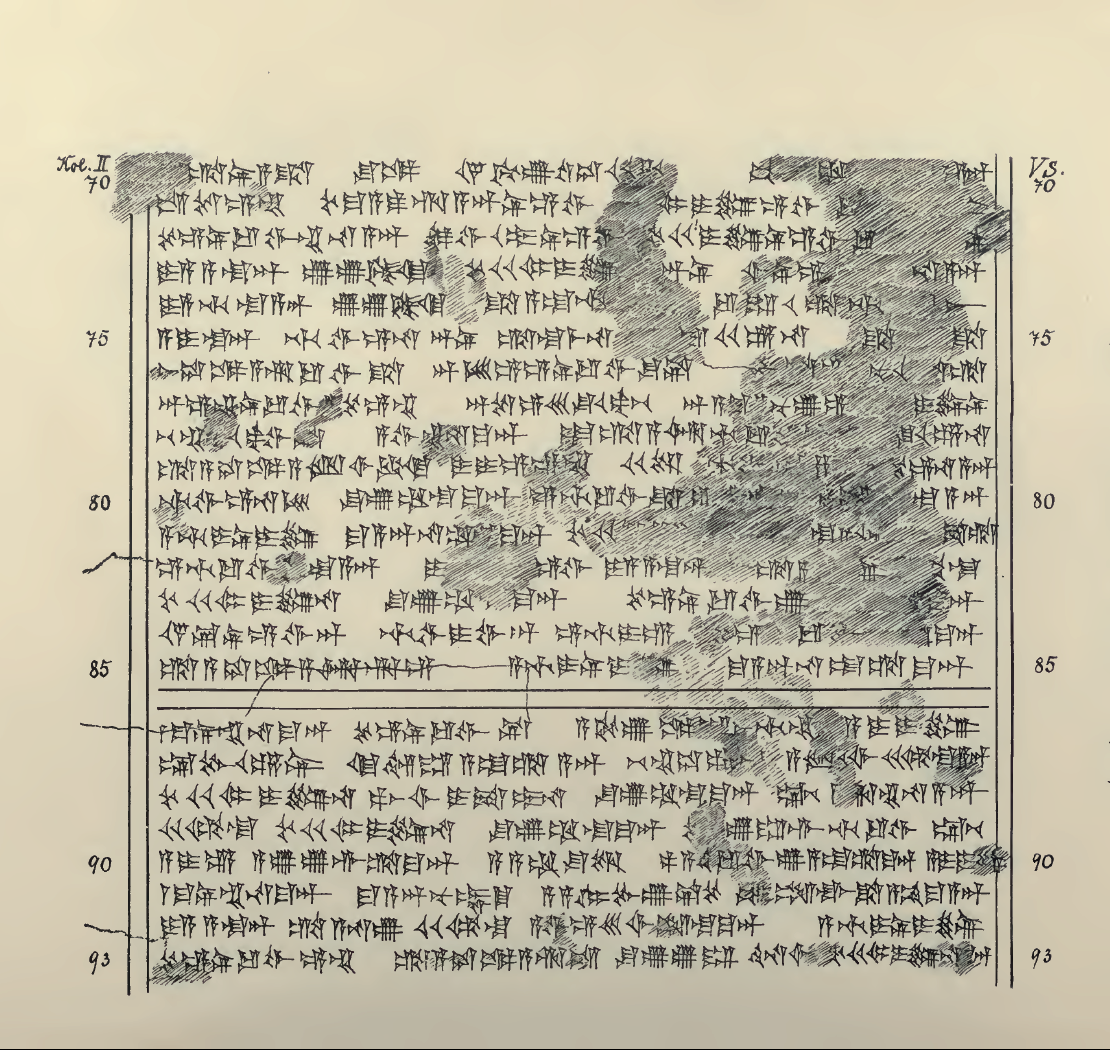
Column II, lines 70–93

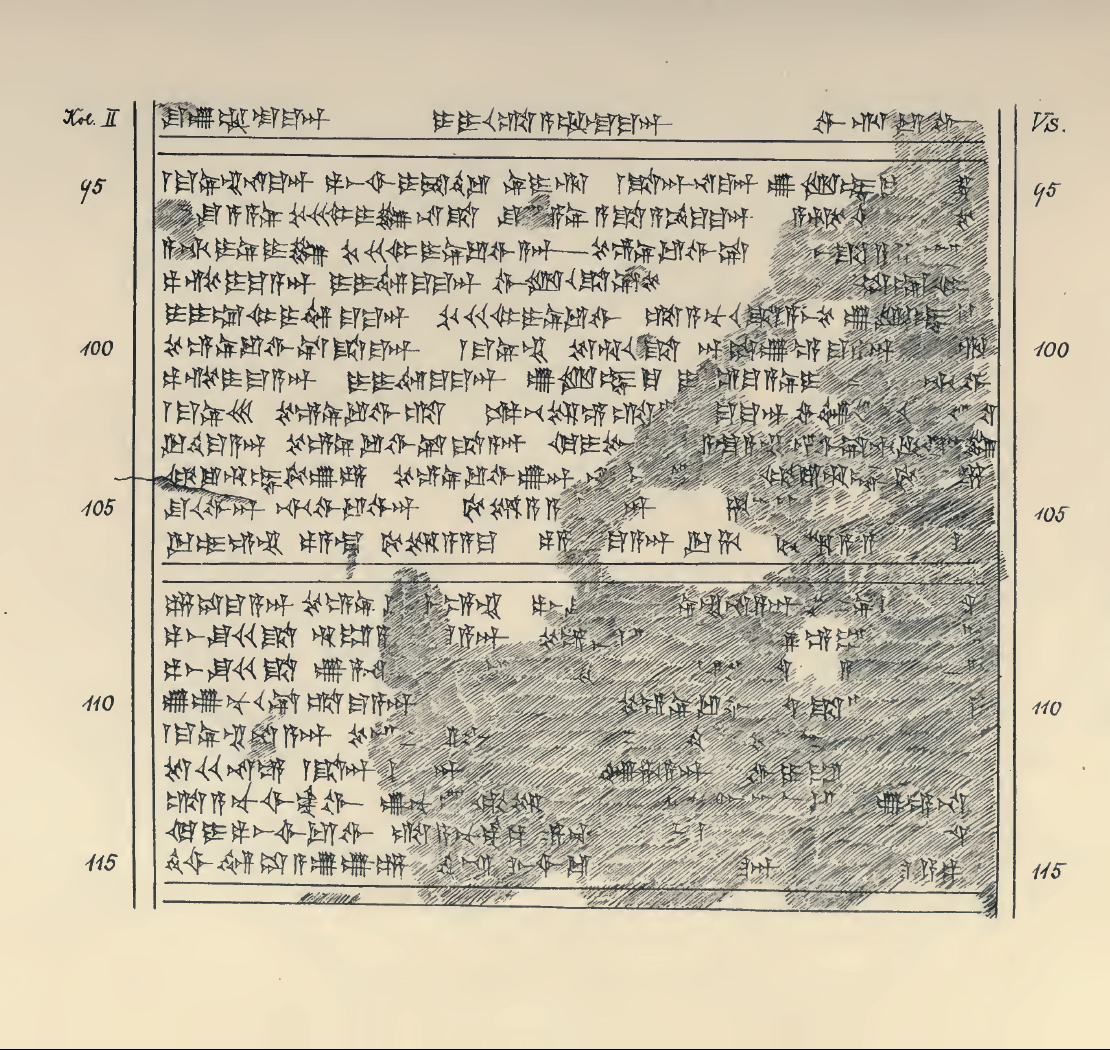
Column II, lines 94–115

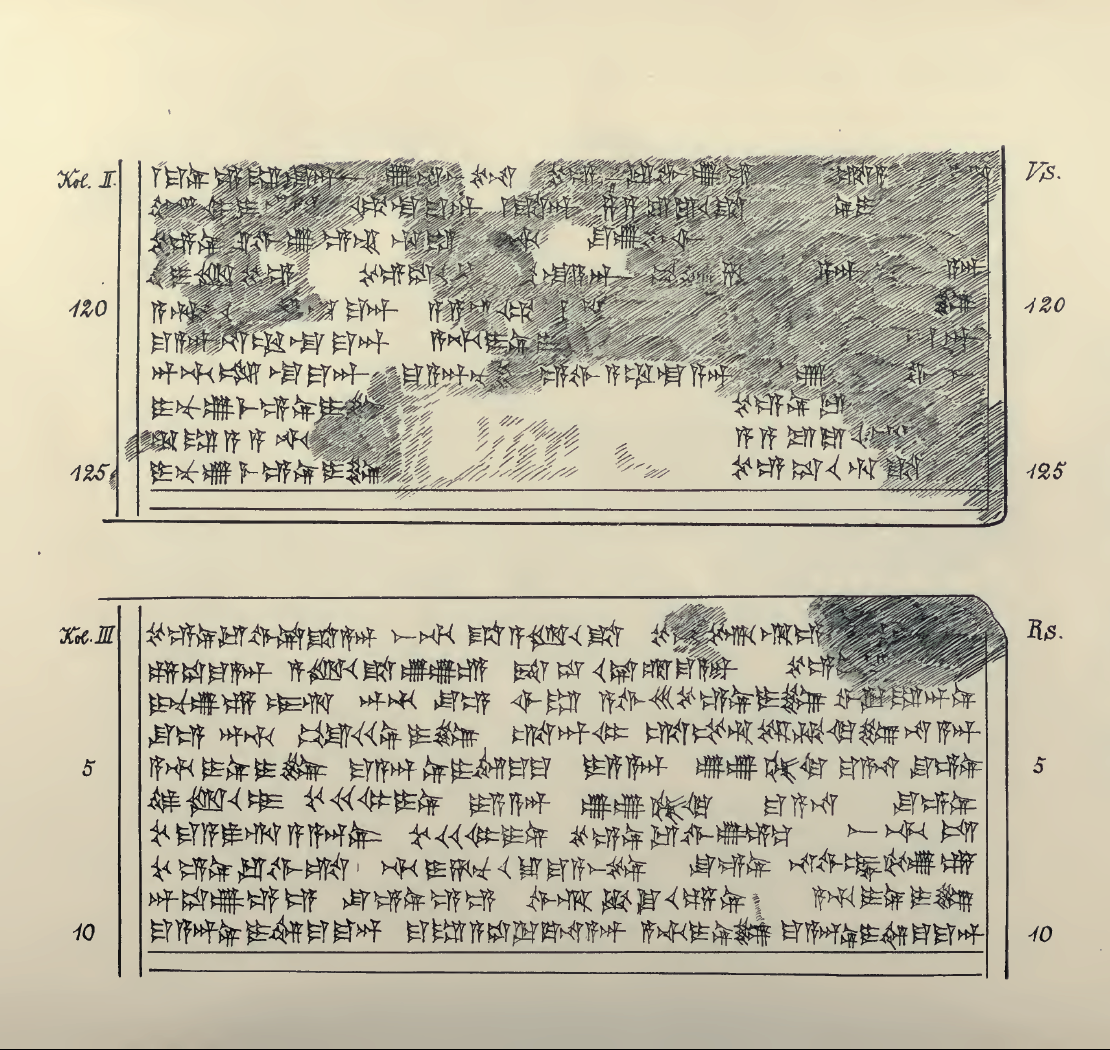
Column II, lines 116–125 and column III, lines 1–10

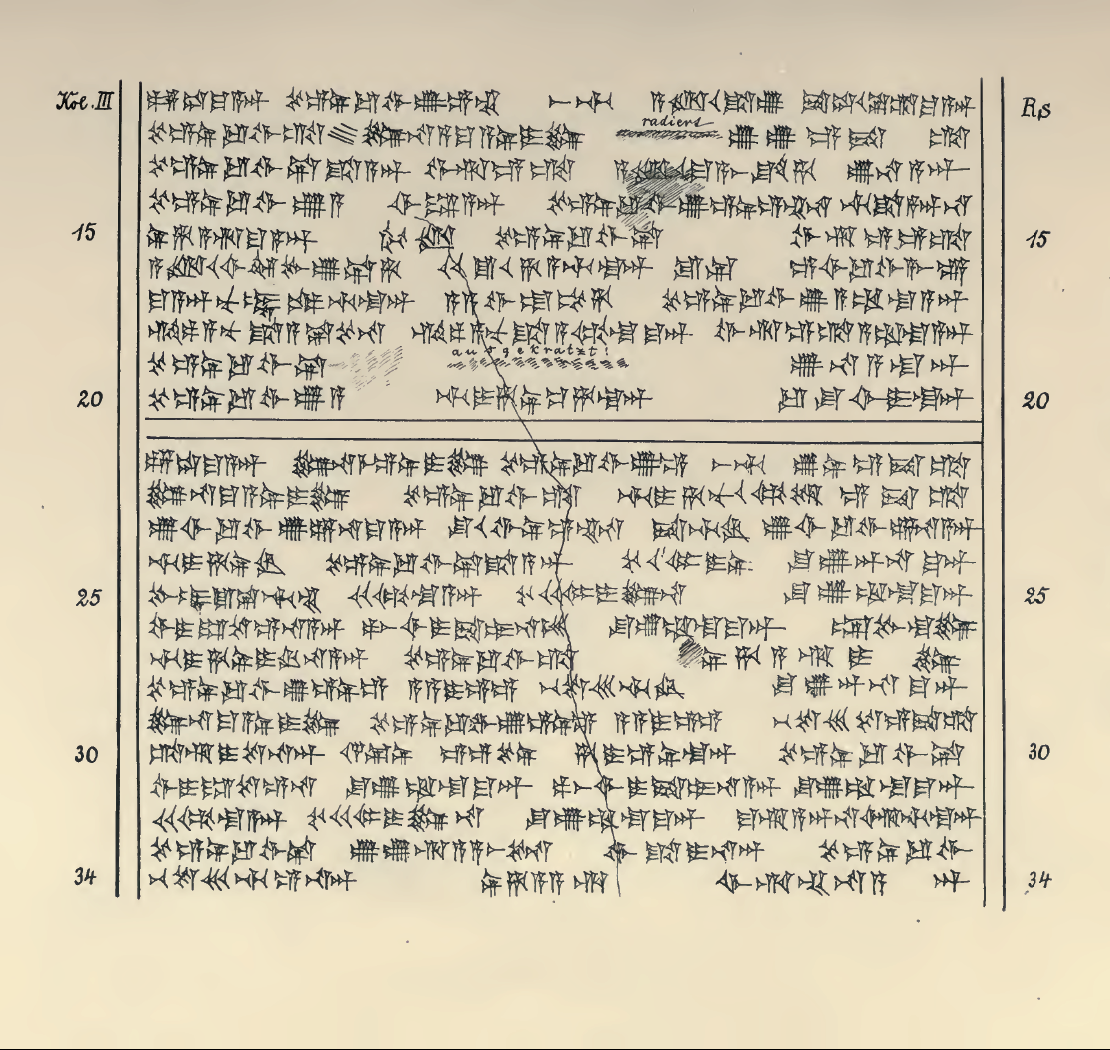
Column III, lines 11–34

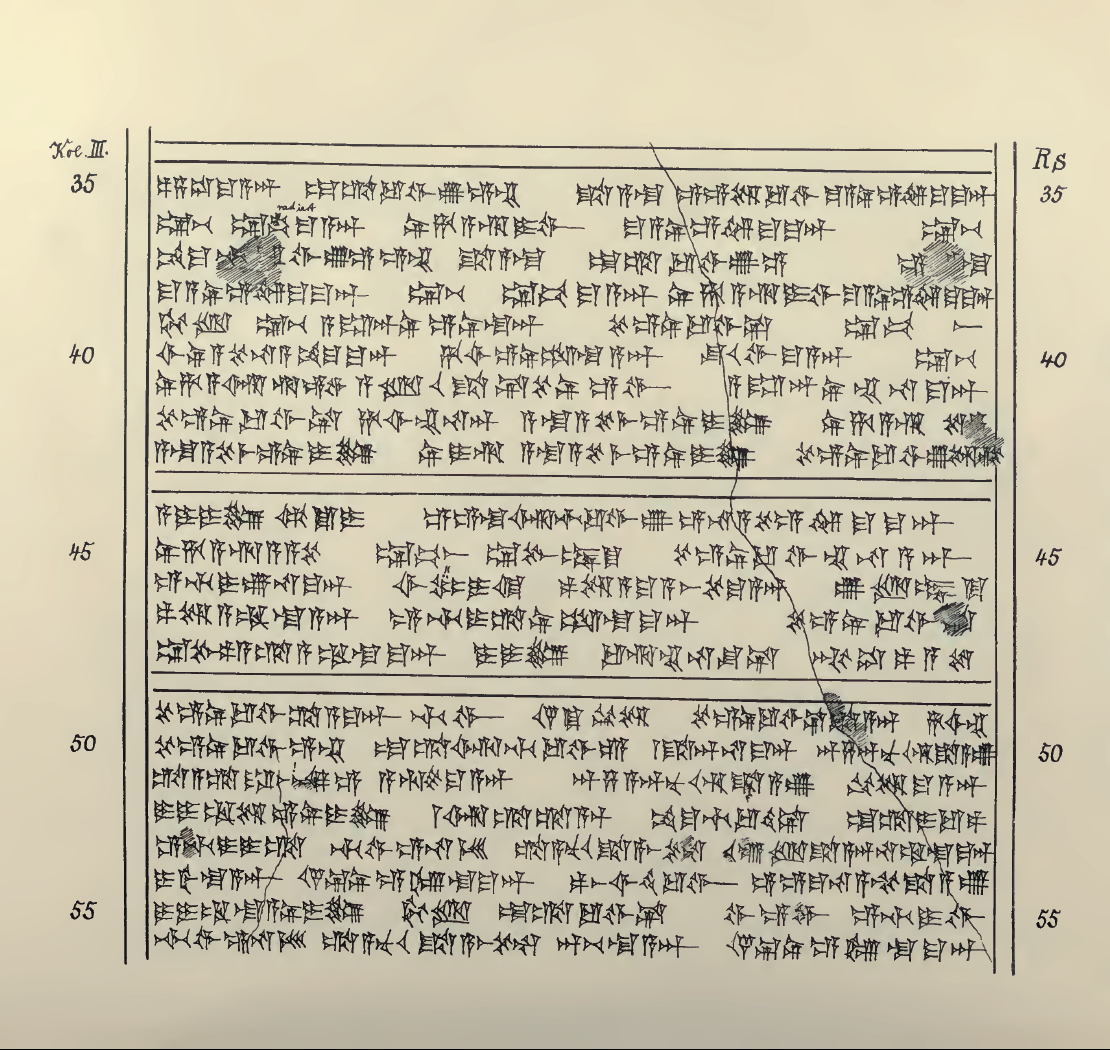
Column III, lines 35–56

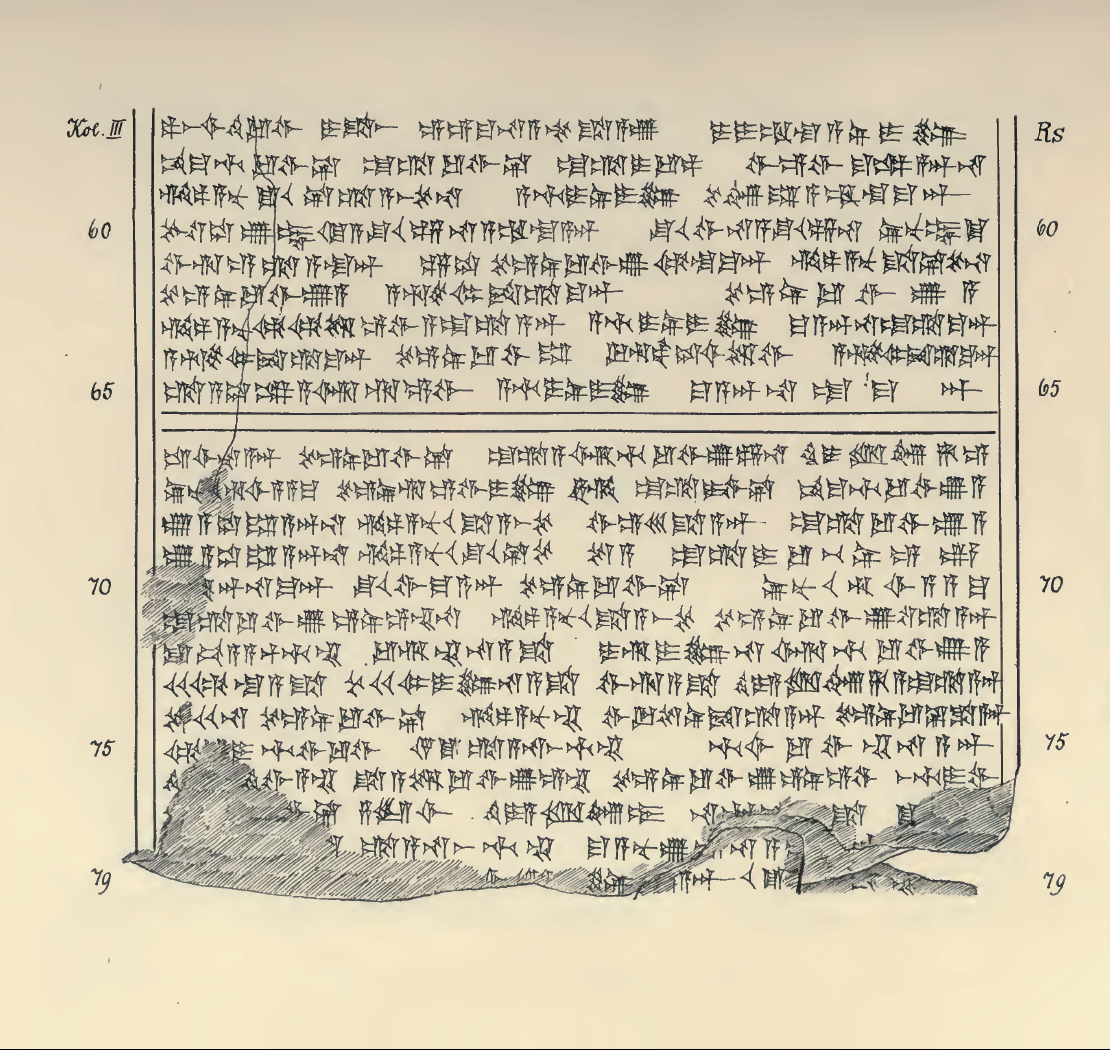
Column III, lines 57–79

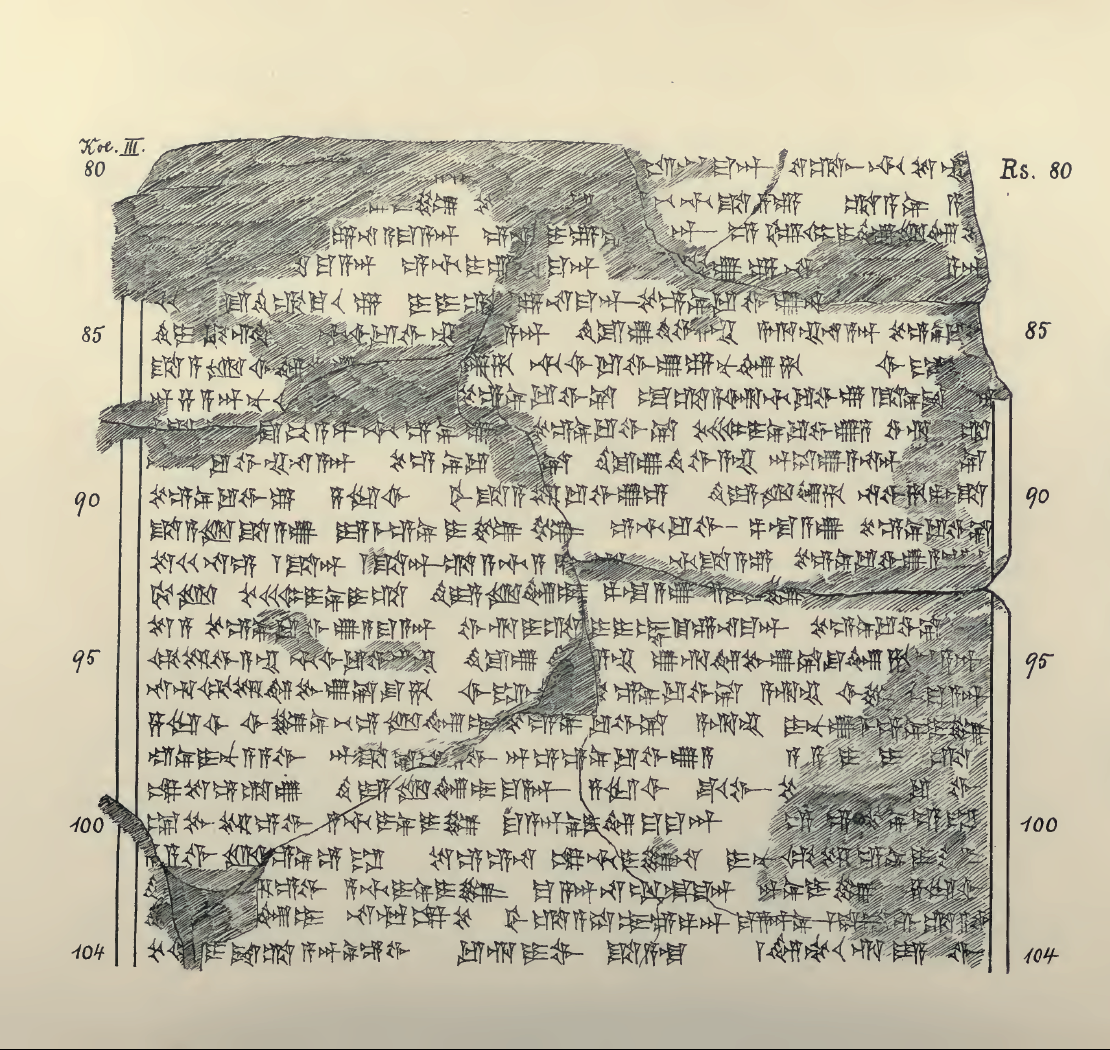
Column III, lines 80–104

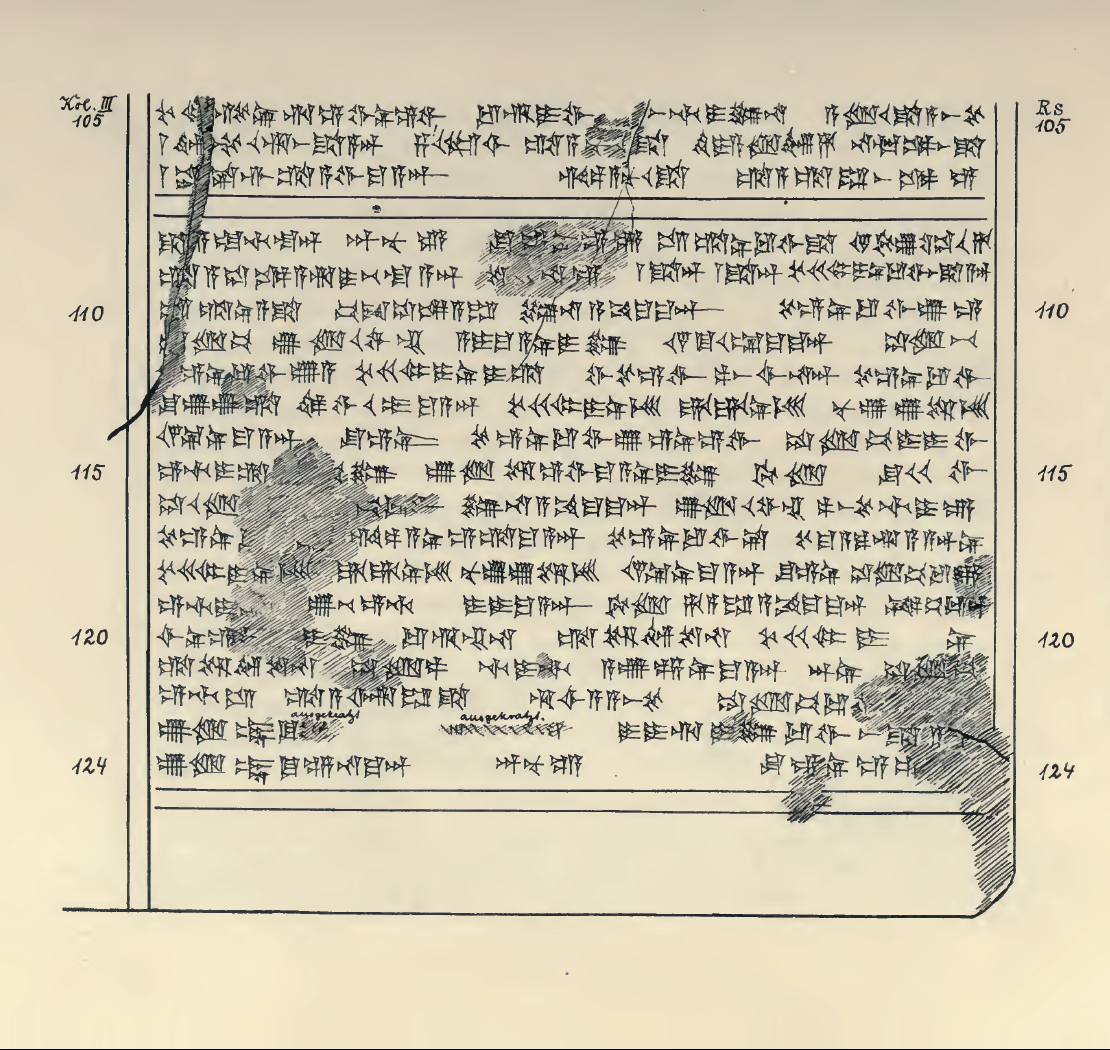
Column III, lines 105–124

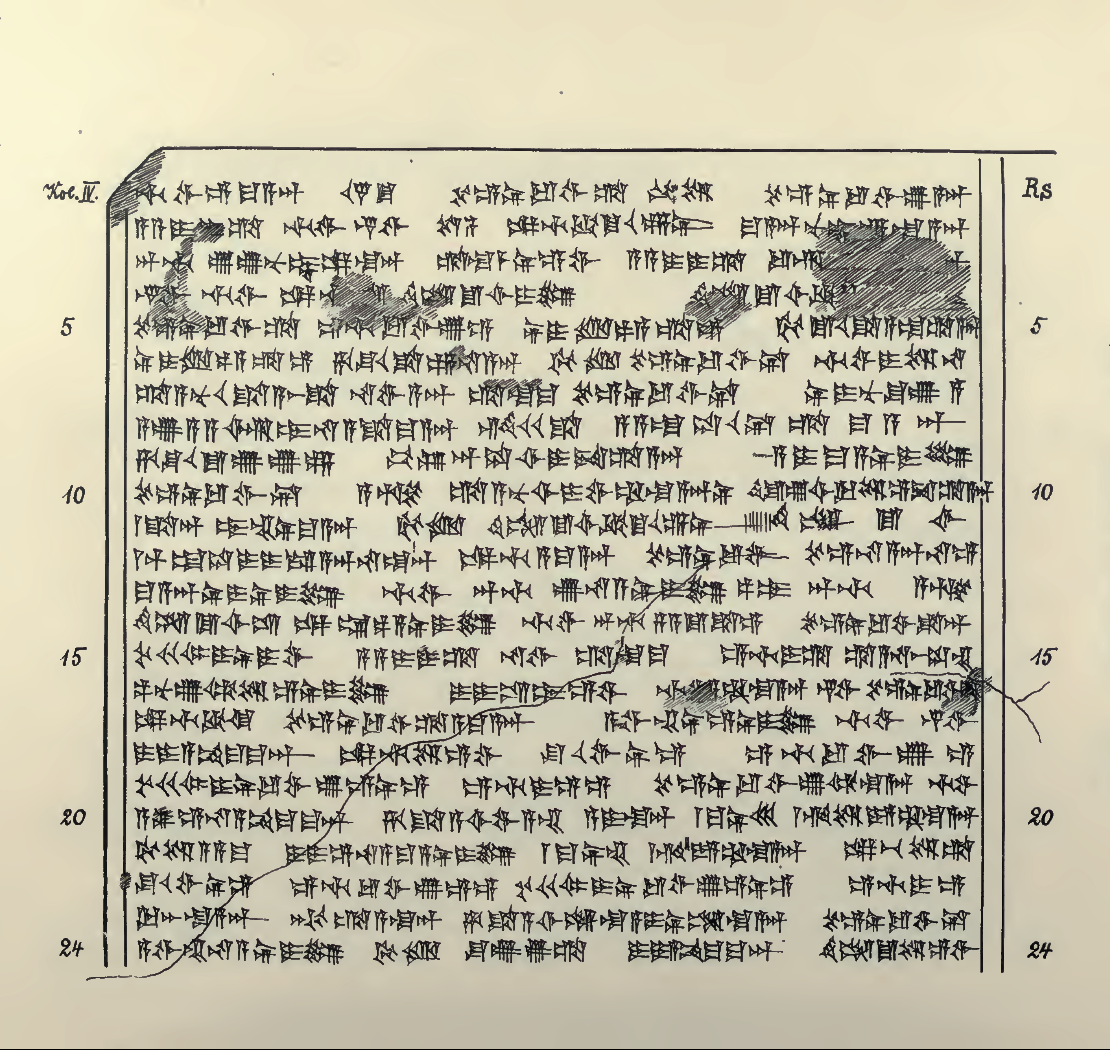
Column IV, lines 1–24

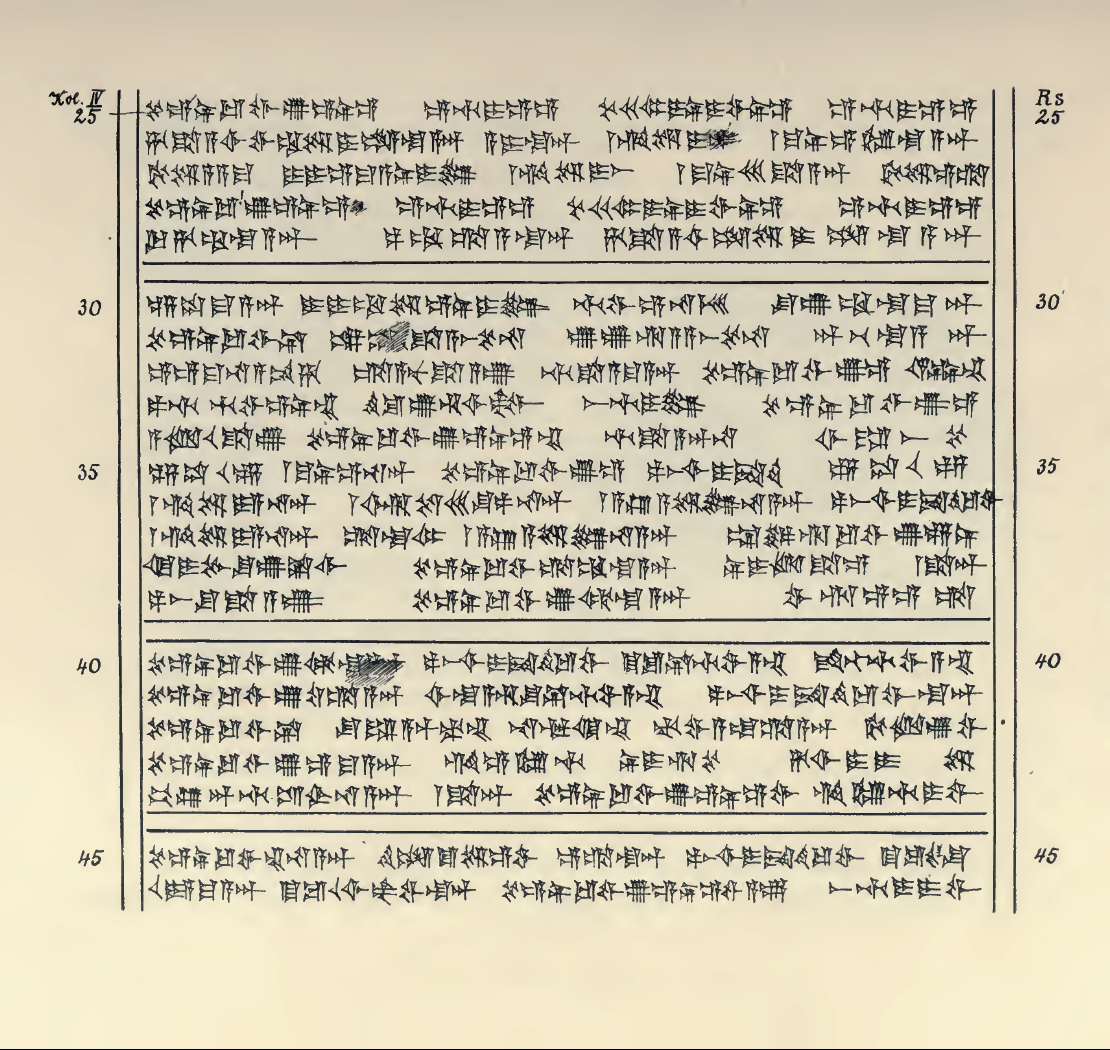
Column IV, lines 25–46

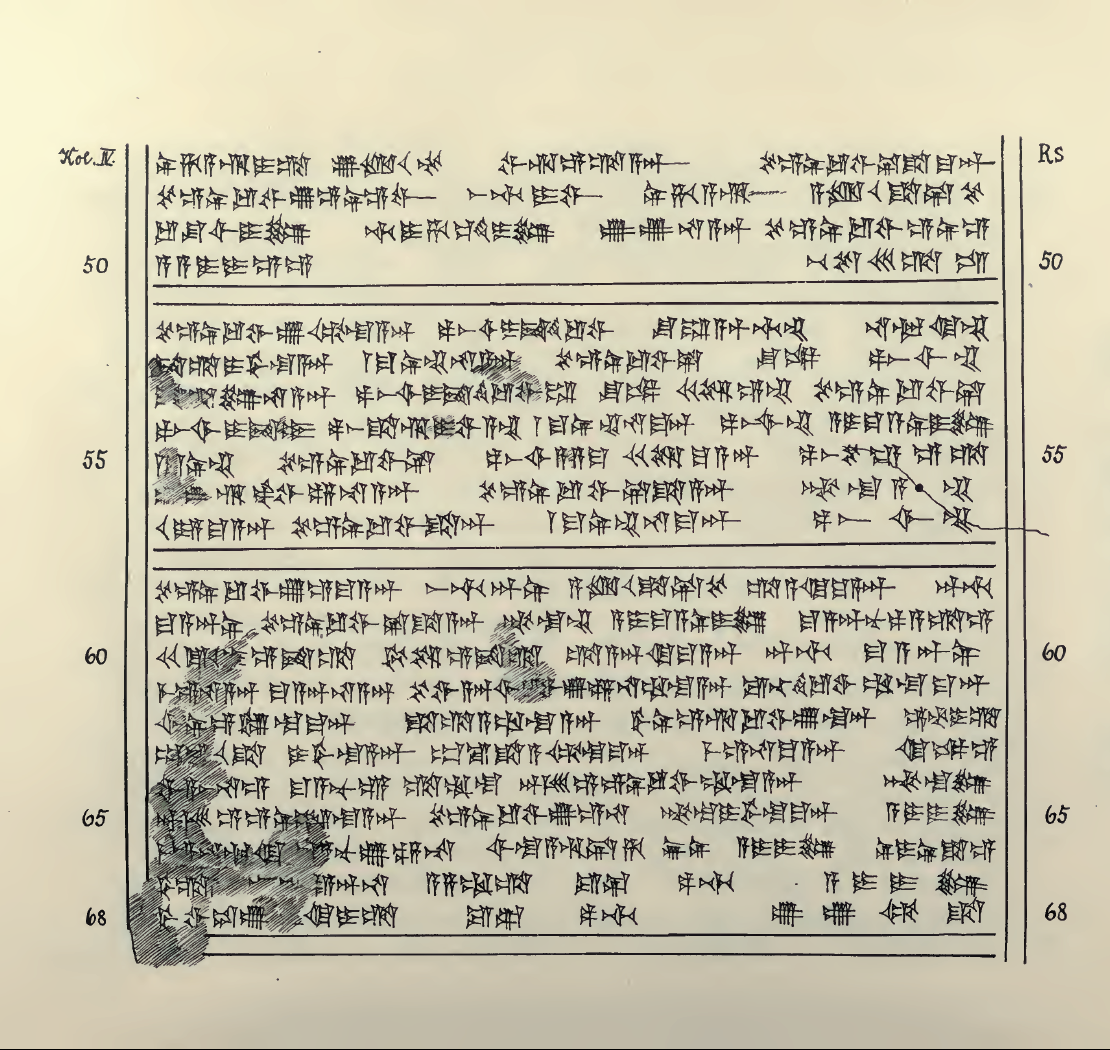
Column IV, lines 47–68

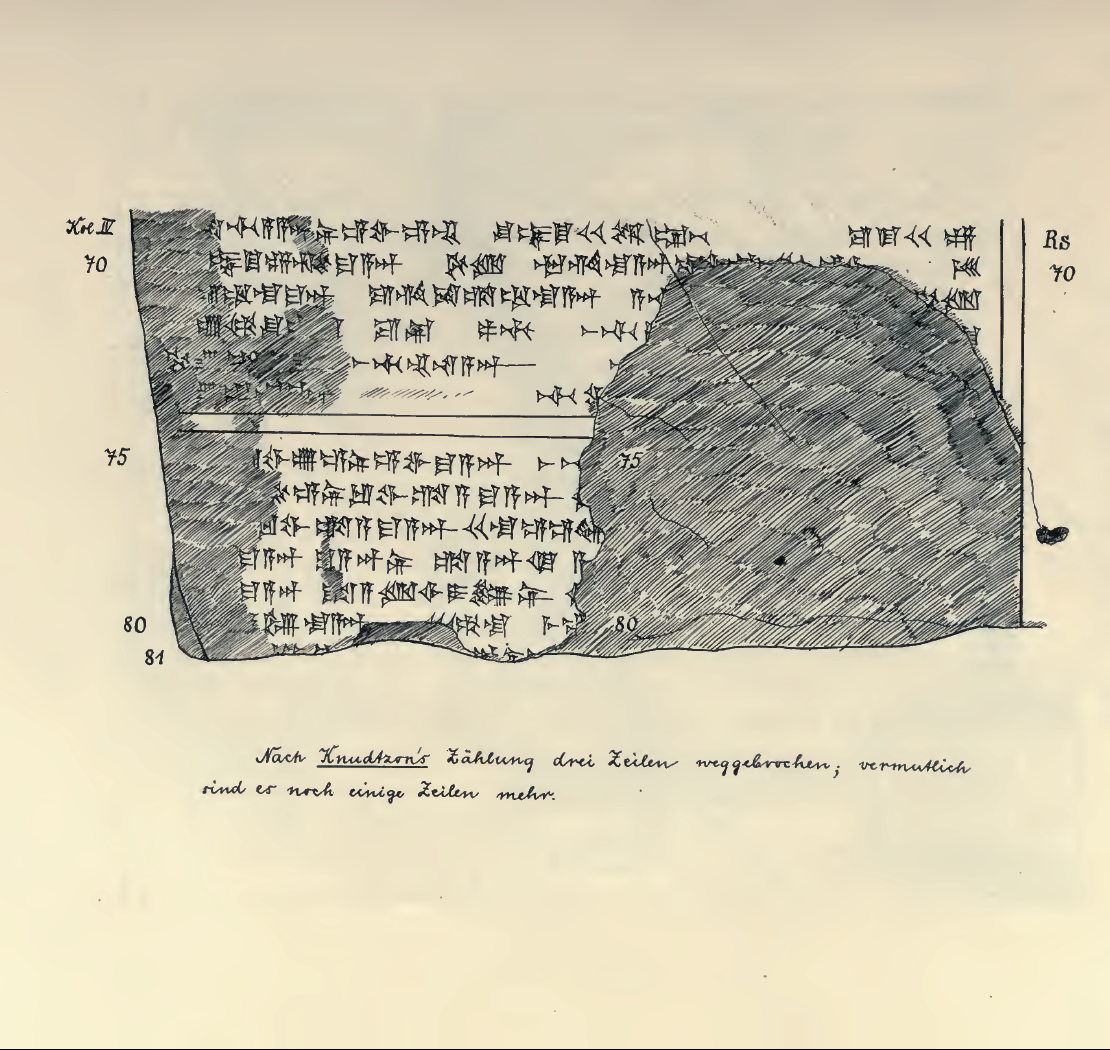
Column IV, lines 69–81 (82–84 destroyed)

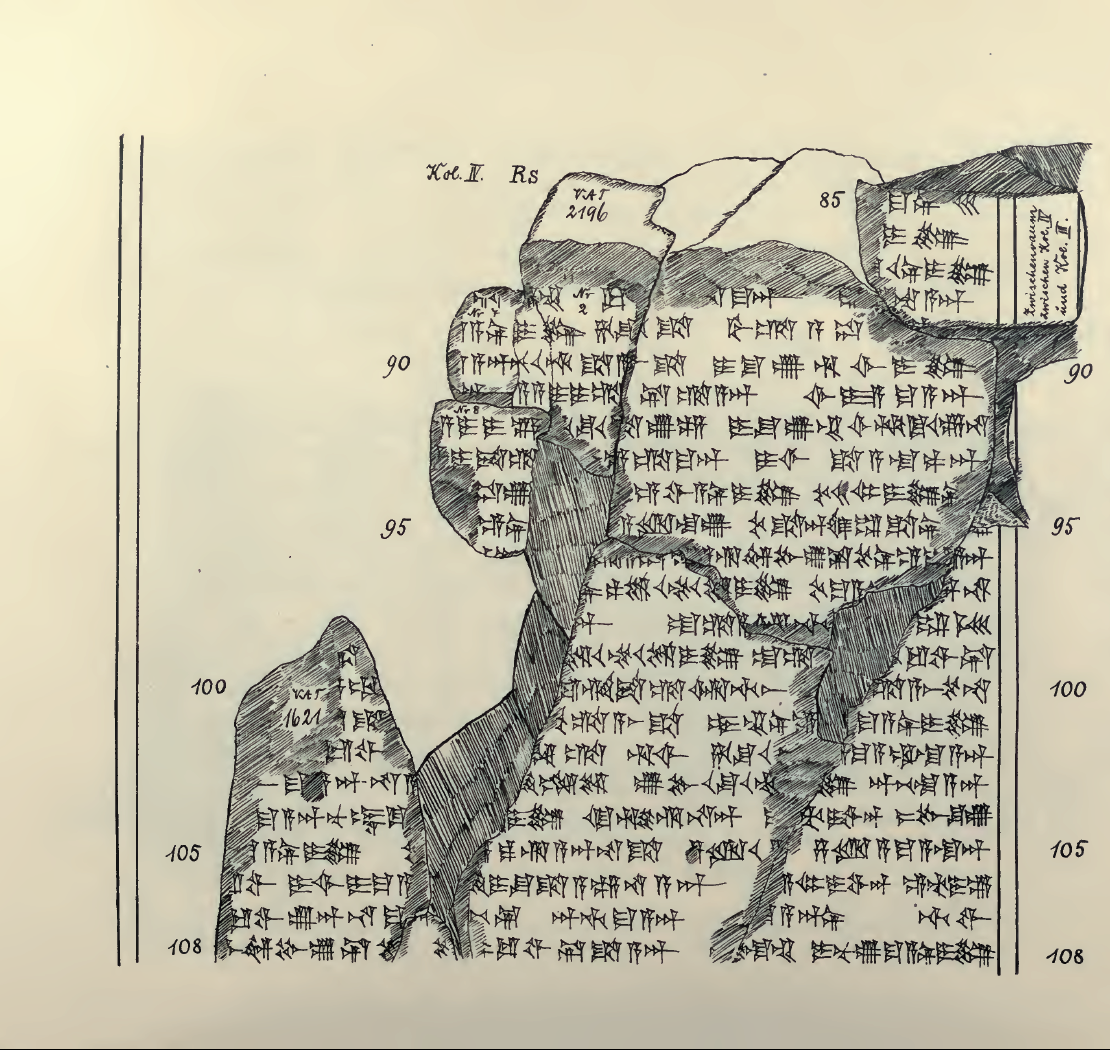
Column IV, lines 85–108

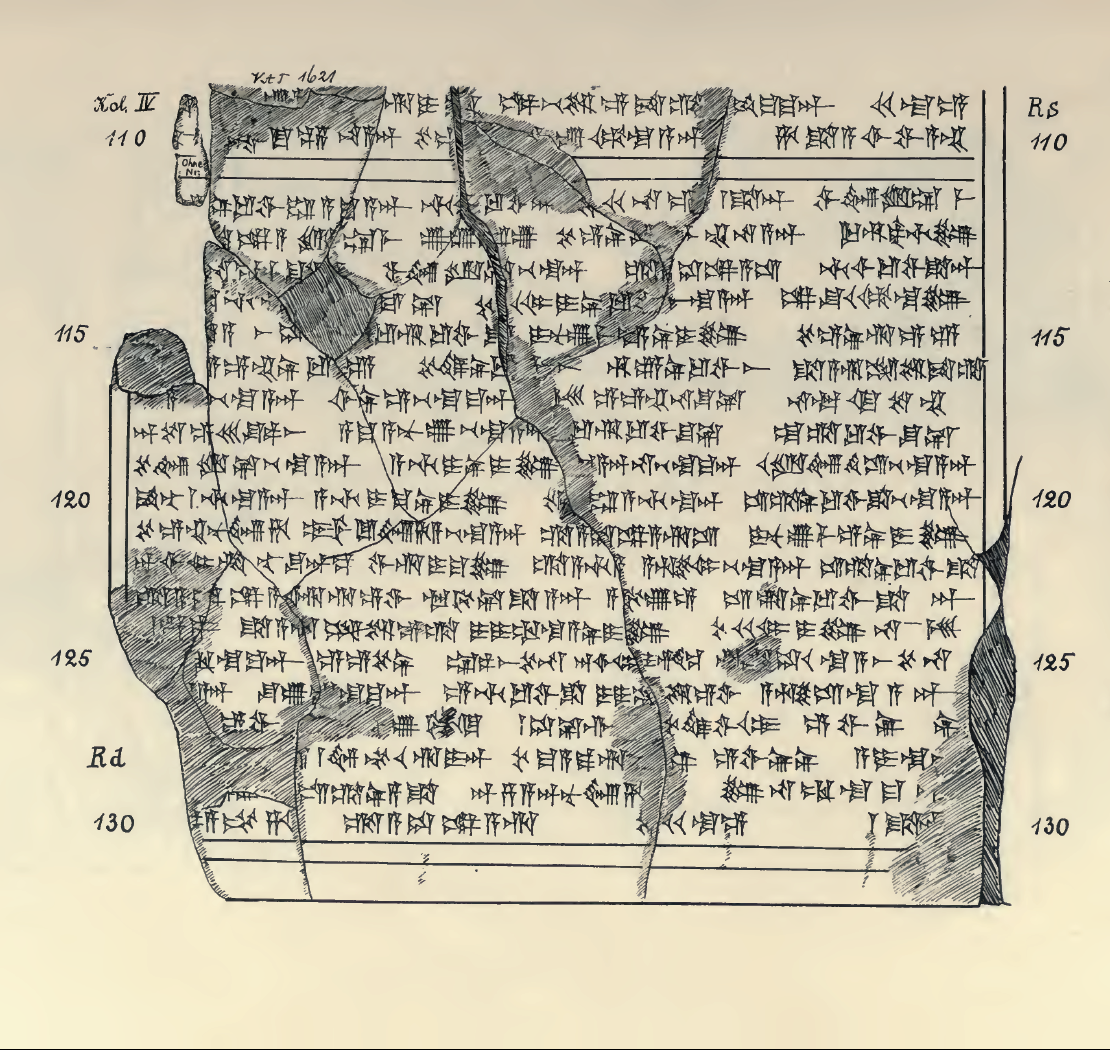
Column IV, lines 109–130

== Historical context ==
At the end of the 15th century BCE, Thutmose IV, seeking an ally in the Near East to support his control over Syria, established political relations with Artatama I, the ruler of Mitanni. These were sealed by the marriage of the pharaoh to Princess Mutemwiya. The alliance was also beneficial for Artatama I, who feared the growing power of the Hittites. The successors of both rulers – Amenhotep III and Tushratta – continued the policies of Thutmose IV and Artatama I. Two marriages of the pharaoh served as guarantees of good relations: with the Mitanni princess Gilukhipa – Tushratta's sister, and later in his life, with Tadukhipa – the daughter of the king of Mitanni. Agreements between the two states were preceded by the exchange of diplomatic correspondence. Shortly after Tadukhipa's arrival in Egypt, Amenhotep III passed away. Therefore, the princess became the wife of Akhenaten.

The passive approach of Amenhotep III's successor to Asian politics contributed to the weakening of Mitanni. Assyria and Hattusa took advantage of this situation. The rulers of both cities formed a military alliance against Mitanni. Tushratta perished as a result of the conflict with Šuppiluliuma I, and his successors acknowledged the supremacy of the Hittite kings.

== Description ==
The document was written on a clay tablet in cuneiform script. The text is divided into four columns and originally contained 494 lines. Apart from the Akkadian introductory formulas, it was written in the western dialect of the Hurrian language: the text in Hurrian comprised 478 lines, while in Akkadian – 16. Most fragments of the text are well preserved.

The first column contains 115 lines. 13 lines – from 28 to 40 inclusive – are completely destroyed. The second column contains 125 lines, with 12 lines destroyed – from 37 to 48 inclusive. Columns 3 and 4 are on the reverse side of the document. The third column consists of 124 lines. None are destroyed, but several are fragmented. The last column contains 127 lines, preserved in whole or in part. After line 81, three (though possibly more) lines are broken off. At the level of line 85, the space between the fourth and third columns is filled with loose fragments. In total, 466 lines have been preserved in whole or in fragments: 102 in the first column, 113 in the second, 124 in the third, and 127 in the fourth.

The recipient of the letter is Amenhotep III. The letter contains matters concerning the marriage of Tadukhipa to Amenhotep III, mentions of her dowry, with references to previous letters listing items given to Tadukhipa as dowry, references to building good political relations between Egypt and Mitanni, information about the exchange of envoys along with their names – the Egyptian Mane and the Mitannian Keliya, assurances of friendship between the two states, and Mitanni's loyalty to Egypt.

== Bibliography ==
- Friedrich, J. (1969). "Churritisch". In Spuler, B. (ed.). Altkleinasiatische Sprachen (in German). Leiden–Köln: Brill.
- Kuhrt, A. (2003). The ancient Near East. C. 3000–330 BC. From c. 3000 BC to c. 1200 BC. Vol. 1. New York: Routledge. ISBN 0-415-01353-4.
- Mynářová, Jana (2007). Language of Amarna – language of diplomacy. Perspectives on the Amarna letters. Prague: Czech Institute of Egyptology. ISBN 978-80-7308-191-1. OCLC 229031894.
- Popko, Maciej (2005). Huryci (in Polish). Warsaw: Państwowy Instytut Wydawniczy. OCLC 749506212.
- Saggs, H. W. F. (1989). Civilization Before Greece and Rome. New Haven: Yale University Press. ISBN 0-300-04440-2.
- Schroeder, O. (1915). "Die Tontafelm von El-Amarna" (PDF). Vorderasiatische Schriftdenkmäler der Königlichen Museen zu Berlin (in German). 12 (2). Leipzig.
- Szczudłowska, A., ed. (1978). Starożytny Egipt (in Polish). Warsaw: Wydawnictwo Naukowe PWN.
- Zabłocka, J. (1982). Historia Bliskiego Wschodu w starożytności (od początku osadnictwa do podboju perskiego) (in Polish). Wrocław: Ossolineum. ISBN 83-04-00710-X.
