= Hurro-Urartian languages =

Extinct language family

Hurro-Urartian
- Geographic distribution: Armenian Highlands, Anatolia, Levant, Mesopotamia, Zagros Mountains
- Extinct: 6th century BCE (Urartian)
- Linguistic classification: One of the world's primary language families
- Proto-language: Proto-Hurro-Urartian
- Subdivisions: Hurrian; Urartian; ? Gutian; ? Kassite; ? Lullubian; ? Mannaean; ? Subarian

Language codes
- Glottolog: hurr1239

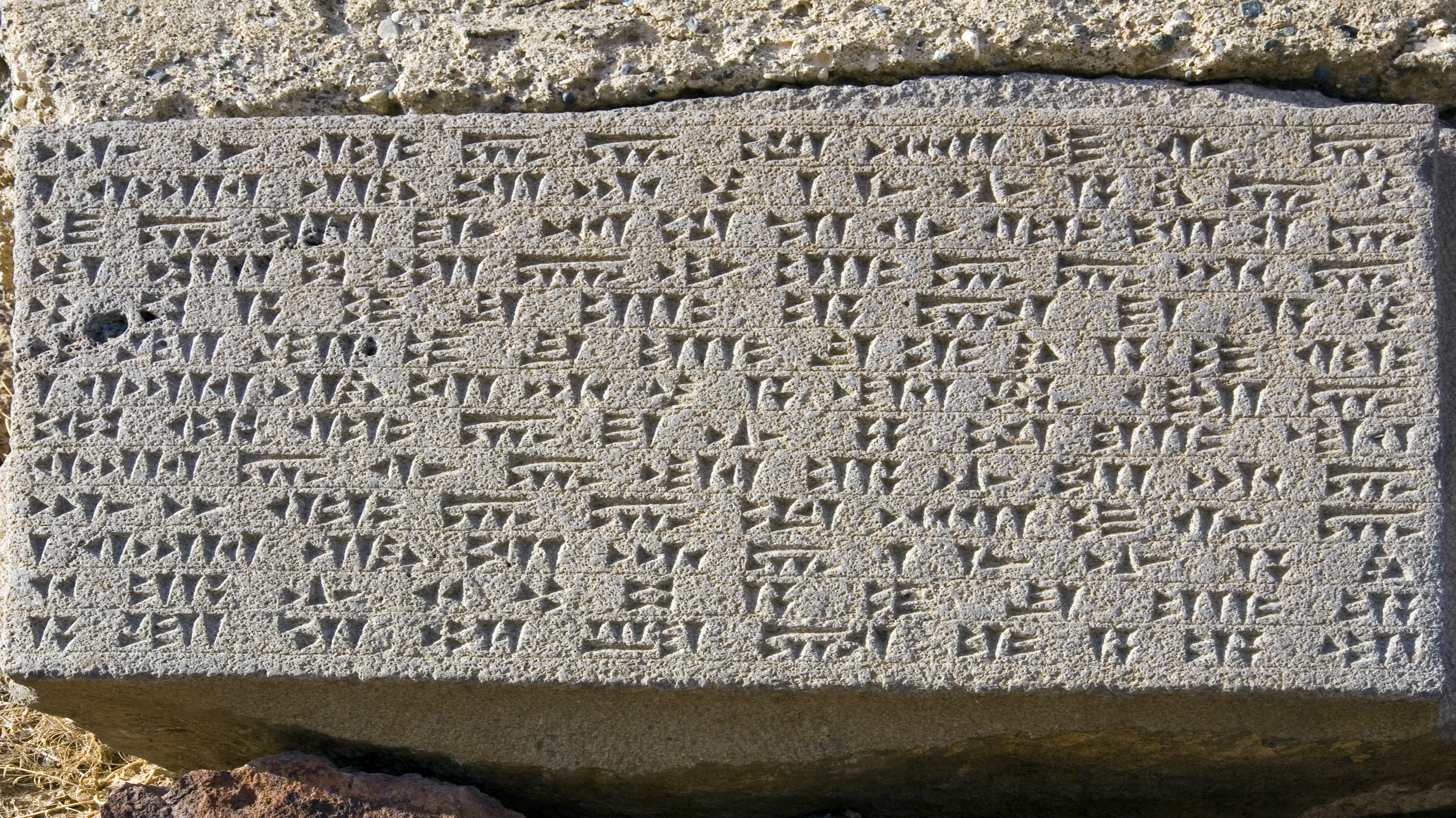
Urartian text

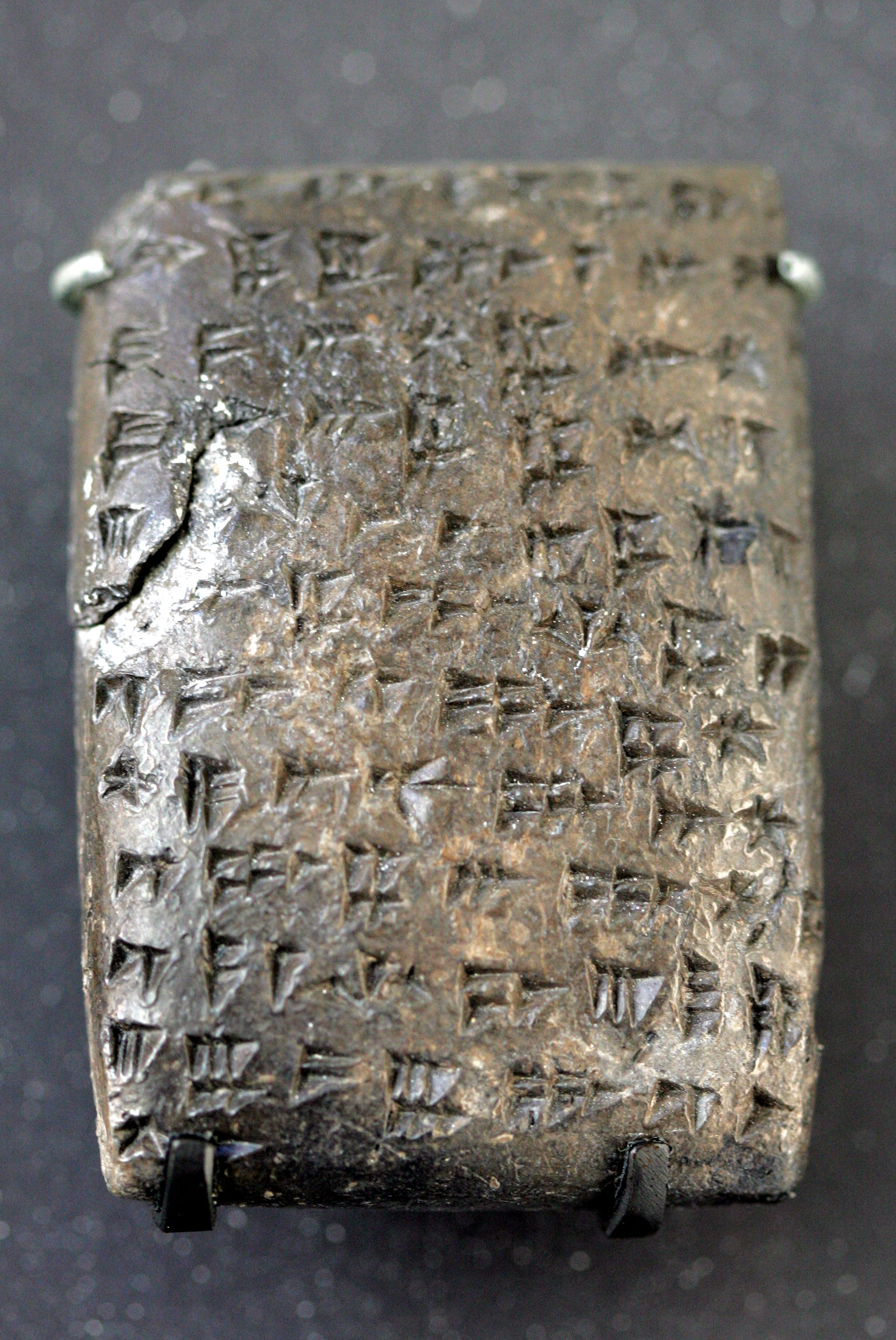
Hurrian text

Hurro-Urartian is an extinct language family of the Ancient Near East, comprising only two known languages: Hurrian and Urartian.

== Origins ==
One model projects that Proto-Hurro-Urartian, the pre-split Hurro-Urartian language family, was originally spoken by people of the Kura-Araxes culture which existed in Eastern Anatolia, the Caucasus, northwestern Iran, Upper Mesopotamia and northern Levant from the late 5th millennium BC to late 3rd millennium BC.

== External classification ==
While the genetic relation between Hurrian and Urartian is undisputed, the wider connections of Hurro-Urartian to other language families are controversial. After the deciphering of Hurrian and Urartian inscriptions and documents in the 19th and early 20th century, Hurrian and Urartian were soon recognized as not related to the Semitic or later arriving Indo-European languages, Kartvelian languages, nor to language isolates of the region such as Sumerian, Elamite, Gutian and Hattian. At present, the consensus view of linguists is the most conservative view: Hurro-Urartian is a primary language family not demonstrably related to any other language family.

Since the discovery of the familial links between Hurrian and Urartian, various researchers have proposed potential genetic relationships of the Hurro-Urartian languages to other language families. Early proposals for an external genetic relationship of Hurro-Urartian variously grouped them with the Kartvelian languages, Elamite, and other non-Semitic and non-Indo-European languages of the region.

More modern proposals attempt to link the Hurro-Urartian family with either the Northeastern Caucasian language family (via Igor Diakonoff and Sergei Starostin's proposed Alarodian language family) or with Indo-European languages (via Arnaud Fornet and Allan R. Bomhard). Neither proposal has gained much traction within mainstream historical linguistics, with some scholars raising doubts regarding the arguments advanced in favour of a genetic relationship between the language families, or at least maintaining that the evidence is as yet inconclusive.

The poorly-attested Kassite language is not a member of the Semitic or Indo-European families, and it may instead have been a Hurro-Urartian language or a language isolate. However, only approximately 100 words of Kassite are known.

== Contacts with other languages ==
Hurrian was the language of the Hurrians, occasionally called "Hurrites". It was spoken in the northern parts of Mesopotamia and Syria and the southeastern parts of Anatolia between at least the last quarter of the third millennium BC and its extinction towards the end of the second millennium BC. There were various Hurrian-speaking states, of which the most prominent one was the kingdom of Mitanni (1450–1270 BC), and also partly those of Lullubi and the Turukkaeans, the latter two also showing East Semitic Akkadian influence. It has been proposed that two little known groups, the Nairi of southeast Anatolia and the Mannae of northwestern Iran, might have been Hurrian speakers. As little is known about them, it is hard to draw any conclusions about what languages they spoke.

The Kassite language was possibly related to Hurro-Urartian. Francfort and Tremblay on the basis of the Akkadian textual and archaeological evidence from Assyria and Babylonia, proposed to identify the kingdom of Marhashi and Ancient Margiana. The Marhashite personal names seem to point towards an Eastern variant of Hurrian, or another language of the Hurro-Urartian language family rather than to Semitic or Indo-European, the latter of which had not yet appeared in the region.

There was a strong Hurrian influence on the Hittite culture in ancient times, so many Hurrian texts are preserved from Hittite political centres. The Mitanni variety is chiefly known from the so-called "Mitanni letter" from Hurrian Tushratta to pharaoh Amenhotep III surviving in the Amarna archives. The "Old Hurrian" variety is known from some early royal inscriptions and from religious and literary texts, especially from Hittite centres.

Urartian is attested from the late 9th century BC to the late 7th century BC as the official written language of the state of Urartu and was probably spoken by the majority of the population in the mountainous areas around Lake Van and the upper Zab valley. It branched off from Hurrian at approximately the beginning of the second millennium BC. Scholars, such as Paul Zimansky, contend that Urartian was only spoken by a small ruling class and was not the primary language of the majority of the population.

Although Hurro-Urartian languages gradually became extinct with the collapse of the Urartu empire following its subjugation by Assyria in the 8th and 7th centuries BC, Diakonoff and Greppin suggested that traces of its vocabulary survived in a small number of loanwords in Old Armenian, a later arriving Indo-European language. More recent scholarship by Arnaud Fournet, Hrach Martirosyan, Armen Petrosyan, and others has proposed more extensive contacts between the languages, including vocabulary, grammar, parts of speech, and proper nouns loaned into Armenian, such as Urartian "eue" ("and"), attested in the earliest Urartian texts (compare to Armenian "yev" (և, եվ), ultimately from Proto-Indo-European *h₁epi). Other loans from Urartian into Armenian includes personal names, toponyms, and names of deities.

There are some lexical matches between Hurro-Urartian and Sumerian, which was a language isolate, indicating an early contact.

== Characteristics ==
Besides their fairly consistent ergative alignment and their generally agglutinative morphology, despite a number of not entirely predictable morpheme mergers, Hurrian and Urartian are both characterized by the use of suffixes in their derivational and inflectional morphology, including ten to fifteen grammatical cases, and postpositions in syntax. Both are considered to have the default order subject–object–verb, although there is significant variation, especially in Urartian.

In both languages, nouns can receive a peculiar "anaphoric suffix" comparable, albeit apparently not identical, to a definite article. Nominal modifiers are marked by Suffixaufnahme, i.e. they receive a "copy" of the case suffixes of the head. In verbs, the type of valency, intransitive vs transitive, is signalled by a special suffix, the so-called "class marker".

The complex morpheme "chains" of nouns and verbs follow roughly the same morpheme sequences in both languages. In nouns, the sequence in both languages is stem – article – possessive suffix – plural suffix – case suffix – agreement (Suffixaufnahme) suffix. In verbs, the portion of the structure shared by both languages is stem – valency marker – person suffixes. Most morphemes have fairly similar phonological forms in the two languages.

Despite this structural similarity, there are significant differences. In the phonology, written Hurrian only seems to distinguish a single series of phonemic obstruents without any contrastive phonation distinctions; the variation in voicing, though visible in the script, was allophonic. In contrast, written Urartian distinguishes as many as three series: voiced, voiceless and "emphatic", perhaps glottalized. Urartian is characterized by the apparent reduction of some word-final vowels to schwa, e.g. Urartian ulə vs Hurrian oli "another", Urartian eurišə vs Hurrian evrišše "lordship", Hurrian 3rd person plural enclitic pronoun -lla vs Urartian -lə. As the last two examples shows, the Hurrian geminates are absent in Urartian.

In the morphology, there are differences. Hurrian indicates the plural of nouns through a special suffix -až-, which only survives in fossilized form merged into some case endings in Urartian. Hurrian clearly marks tense or aspect through special suffixes, the unmarked form is the present tense. Urartian has not been shown to do so in the attested texts. The unmarked form functions as a past tense. Hurrian has special negative verbal suffixes that negate a verb and are placed before the ergative person agreement suffixes. Urartian has no such thing, and instead uses negative particles that are placed before the verb.

In Hurrian, only the person of the ergative subject is marked obligatorily through a suffix in a verb form. The absolutive subject or object is optionally marked with a pronominal enclitic that need not be attached to the verb, and can also be attached to any other word in the clause. In Urartian, the ergative suffixes and the absolutive clitics have merged into a single set of obligatory suffixes, that express the person of both the ergative and the absolutive participant and are an integral part of the verb. In general, the profusion of freely moving pronominal and conjunctional clitics that characterize Hurrian, especially that of the Mitanni letter, has few parallels in Urartian.

Urartian is closer to the so-called Old Hurrian variety, mostly attested in Hittite documents, than to the Hurrian of the Mitanni letter. For example, both use -o-/-u- (rather than -i-) as the marker of transitive valency and both display the plural suffix -it-, expressing the number of the ergative subject and occupying a position before the valency marker.

== Cognates ==
Below are some Hurrian and Urartian lexical cognates, as listed by Kassian (2010).

gloss	Hurrian	Urartian
all	šua=lla	šui=ni-
to burn (tr.)	am-	am-
come	un-	nun=a-
to give	ar-	ar-
hand	šu=ni	šu-
to hear	haš-	haš-
heart	tiša	tiš=ni
I	iš-/šu-	iš-/šu-
mountain	pab=ni	baba=ni
name	tiye	ti=ni
new	šuhe	šuhi
not	=u	u=i, =u=ri
one	šu=kki	šu=sini
road	hari	hari
to go	ušš-	uš-
year	šawali	šali
