= Kassite language =

Extinct ancient language of the Kassite people

Kassite
- Cassite
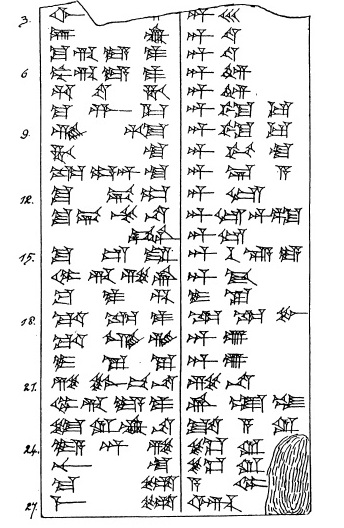
- Tablet BM 93005, with Kassite terms on the left and Akkadian equivalents on the right.
- Native to: Babylon
- Region: Near East
- Ethnicity: Kassites
- Era: 18th–4th century BC
- Language family: unclassified (Hurro-Urartian?)

Language codes
- ISO 639-3: None (mis)
- Glottolog: kass1244

Kassite (also Cassite) was a language spoken by the Kassites in Mesopotamia from approximately the 18th to the 7th century BC. From the 16th to 12th centuries BC, kings of Kassite origin ruled in Babylon until they were overthrown by the Elamites. As only a few dozen words are known, none of which have been demonstrably linked to any living or dead language family, Kassite is considered an unclassified language at present, possibly an isolate or belonging to the Hurro-Urartian languages.

== Vocabulary ==
In the area known to have been inhabited by the Kassites the East Semitic Akkadian language was used, with the Sumerian language used for monumental and literary compositions. Traces of the Kassite language are few:

- a Kassite-Babylonian vocabulary with 48 entries, listing bilingual equivalents of god names, common nouns, verbs, and adjective(s), such as dakaš "star", hašmar "falcon", iašu "country", janzi "king", mašḫu "deity", miriaš "nether world", simbar "young", and šimdi "to give";
- the translations of 19 Kassite personal names on the fourth column of a neo-Assyrian era name list, which occasionally contradicts information given in the Kassite-Babylonian vocabulary;
- scattered references in Akkadian lexical lists to Kassite equivalents of divine names, plants, etc.; for example, the plant names included in the four-tablet Babylonian Pharmacopoeia, uru.an.na = maštakal, such as ḫašimbur, kuruš, pirizaḫ and šagabigalzu, and terms in the eight-tablet synonym list Malku = šarru, such as allak "rim" (of a wheel), and ḫameru "foot";
- many proper names in a variety of Akkadian language documents, principally from Babylonia (especially in the period 1360–850 BC), from Nuzi and from Iran; giving names of deities, people, places and equids;
- technical terms relating to animal husbandry, including marks and color designations of horses and asses, found in Akkadian documents, such as those found on a list of Kassite horse names, sambiḫaruk, meaning unknown, and alzibadar, ḫulalam, lagaštakkaš, pirmaḫ, šimriš, and timiraš, color and marking designations of equids; iškamdi, "bit" for a horse; akkandaš, "spoke" of a wheel; kamūsaš and šaḫumaš for bronze parts of a chariot, in contemporary texts;
- scattered Kassite words, such as the title bugaš; dardaraḫ, "small metal ornament"; and baziḫarzi, a leather object, in an Akkadian context.

A lack of Kassite texts makes the reconstruction of Kassite grammar impossible at present.

Genetic relations of the Kassite language are unclear, although it is generally agreed that it was not Semitic; a relation with Elamite is doubtful.

Relationship with or membership in the Hurro-Urartian family has been suggested, based on a number of words.

== Corpus ==
The small corpus of Kassite words and vocabulary is collected and published by Balkan (1954) and Fournet (2011).

== See also ==
- Kassite Dynasty

== Sources ==
- Ancilotti, A. La lingua dei Cassiti. Milan, 1980.
- Balkan, K. Kassitenstudien. I. Die Sprache der Kassiten. New Haven, 1954.
- Jaritz, Kurt (1957). "Die Kassitischen Sprachreste". Anthropos (in German). 52 (5/6): 850–98. JSTOR 40453114.
