= Tuxcacuexco =

Tuxcacuexco was a state in modern Jalisco in the general area of the modern municipality of Tuxcacuesco prior to the Spanish invasion. It was inhabited by speakers of a Western Otomi language. The relation between this language and the language of the Otomi people of Hidalgo is not known.

In the early 16th-century Tuxcacuexco and its neighboring states, such as Amole and Cozolapa, resisted attempts to conquer them by the Purépecha. These states were conquered by the Spanish in 1523.

== Sources ==
- Gerhard, Peter. Guide to the Historical Geography of New Spain. Cambridge: Cambridge University Press, 1972. p. 46.
