= Ambermo =

Ambermo may be,

- the Mamberamo River
- the supposed 'Ambermo' language
