= Ranch =

Large area of land for raising livestock

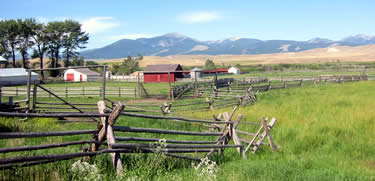
View of the Grant-Kohrs Ranch near Deer Lodge, Montana, U.S.

A ranch (from Spanish: rancho/Mexican Spanish) is an area of land, including various structures, given primarily to ranching, the practice of raising grazing livestock such as cattle and sheep. It is a subtype of farm. These terms are most often applied to livestock-raising operations in Mexico, the Western United States and Western Canada, though there are ranches in other areas. (Note: For terminologies in Australia and New Zealand, see Station (Australian agriculture) and Station (New Zealand agriculture).) People who own or operate a ranch are called ranchers, cattlemen, or stockgrowers. Ranching is also a method used to raise less common livestock such as horses, elk, American bison, ostrich, emu, and alpaca.

Ranches generally consist of large areas, but may be of nearly any size. In the western United States, many ranches are a combination of privately owned land supplemented by grazing leases on land under the control of the federal Bureau of Land Management or the United States Forest Service. If the ranch includes arable or irrigated land, the ranch may also engage in a limited amount of farming, raising crops for feeding the animals, such as hay and feed grains.

Ranches that cater exclusively to tourists are called guest ranches or, colloquially, "dude ranches". Most working ranches do not cater to guests, though they may allow private hunters or outfitters onto their property to hunt native wildlife. However, in recent years, a few struggling smaller operations have added some dude ranch features such as horseback rides, cattle drives, and guided hunting to bring in additional income. Ranching is part of the iconography of the "Wild West" as seen in Western movies and rodeos.

== Etymology ==
The term ranch comes from the Spanish term rancho, itself from the term rancharse, which means “to get ready, to settle in a place, to pitch camp”, itself from the military French term se ranger (to arrange oneself, to tidy up), from the Frankish hring, which means "ring" or "circle". It was, originally, vulgarly applied in the 16th century to the provisional houses of the indigenous peoples of the Americas.

The term evolved differently throughout the Spanish speaking world:

In Mexico, it evolved to mean a cattle farm, station or estate, a pasturing land or agricultural settlement where cattle are raised. Originally used to refer to a hamlet or village where cattle is raised and where the land is sowed; and to a small independent cattle farm, or to a cattle station, an area of land for cattle raising, that is dependent of a hacienda, a large cattle estate.

In Spain it retained its military origin, being defined as: the group of people, typically soldiers, who eat together in a circle; a mess hall. “Rancho” in Spain is also the: “food prepared for several people who eat in a circle and from the same pot.” It was also defined as a family reunion to talk any particular business. While “ranchero” is defined as the: “steward of a mess”, the steward in charge of preparing the food for the “rancho” or mess-hall.

In South America, specifically in Argentina, Uruguay, Chile, Brazil, Bolivia and Paraguay, the term is applied to a modest humble rural home or dwelling, a cottage; while in Venezuela it’s an improvised, illegal dwelling, generally poorly built or not meeting basic habitability requirements; a shanty or slum house.

== Ranch occupations ==
The person who owns and manages the operation of a ranch is usually called a rancher, but the terms cattleman, stockgrower, or stockman are also sometimes used. If this individual in charge of overall management is an employee of the actual owner, the term foreman or ranch foreman is used. A rancher who primarily raises young stock sometimes is called a cow-calf operator or a cow-calf man. This person is usually the owner, though in some cases, particularly where there is absentee ownership, it is the ranch manager or ranch foreman.

The people who are employees of the rancher and involved in handling livestock are called a number of terms, including cowhand, ranch hand, and cowboy. People exclusively involved with handling horses are sometimes called wranglers. Generally, ranch employees have also been referred to as hands or ranch-hands. This stems from 1500 English terminology that referred to manual labor workers as the same name and accentuated the employee's physical job priorities.

== Origins of ranching ==
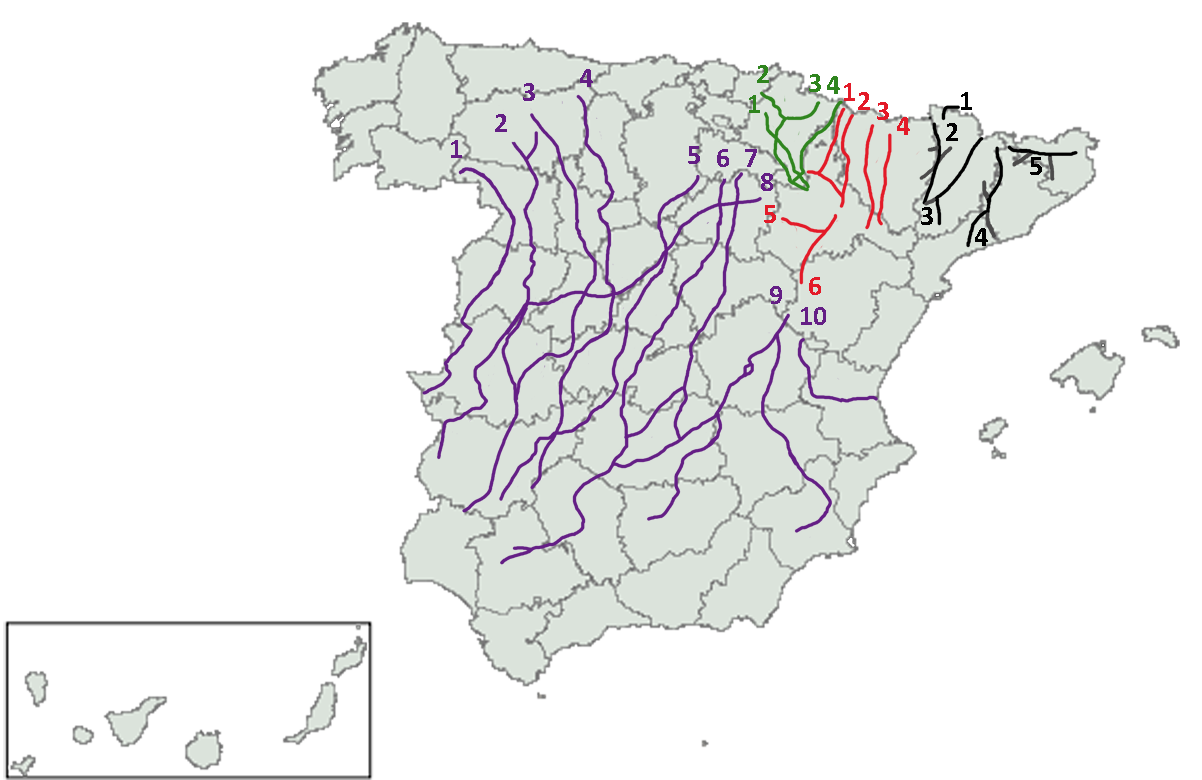
Main transhumance routes in Spain

The most remote origins of a form of ranching, date back to the 1100s in Spain where livestock raising had developed mainly around the raising of sheep and, by the 1200s, the establishment of a system of transhumance being regulated by the powerful Mesta, an association of sheep barons and shepherds created by King Alfonso X of Castile. Although other livestock species, like cattle, existed, their importance, value and herd sizes were lesser than sheep, even before Roman times. The importance of sheep was such that, even in the accounting books for payment of livestock taxes, the serviciadores (servicemen) reduced cows to sheep for accounting purposes, typically six sheep for every cow or horse; because there were so few cows and horses, they did not detract from the value of the figures. Sheep were also used as currency, and currency itself, like the silver solidus, had the equivalency of one sheep. Sheep and sheepherding had such a cultural and economic impact on the culture of Spain that the country was known as un pais de pastores ("a country of shepherds").

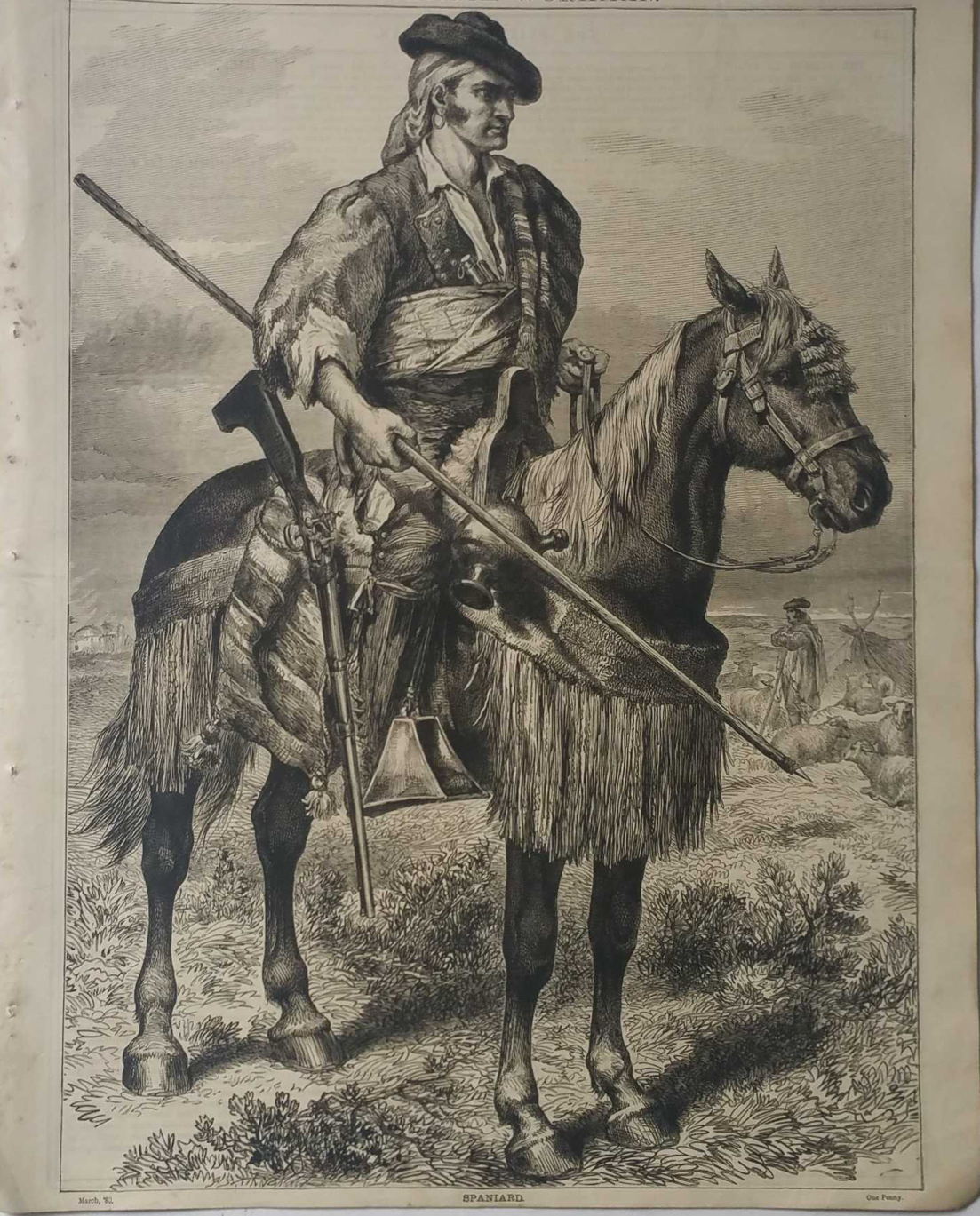
Spanish Shepherd on horseback herding sheep in Murcia (1880).

During the Reconquista, the lands being reclaimed by the Christians had been depopulated. Because these lands were still prone to raids and attacks by the Muslims even after being reconquered, agriculture was out of the question. Instead, livestock raising, predominantly sheep, became the solution to repopulate the land as the animals could easily be moved to a safer place in case of an attack. This led to the emergence of the “pastor a caballo” or horse-mounted shepherd. Called caballeros villanos (knights-villein) or pastores guerreros (warrior shepherds), these were the highest class of peasants and were allowed to have a horse. They, on horseback, could defend the frontier from attacks, easily herd the animals to a safer place, and could do their own raids on Muslim lands.

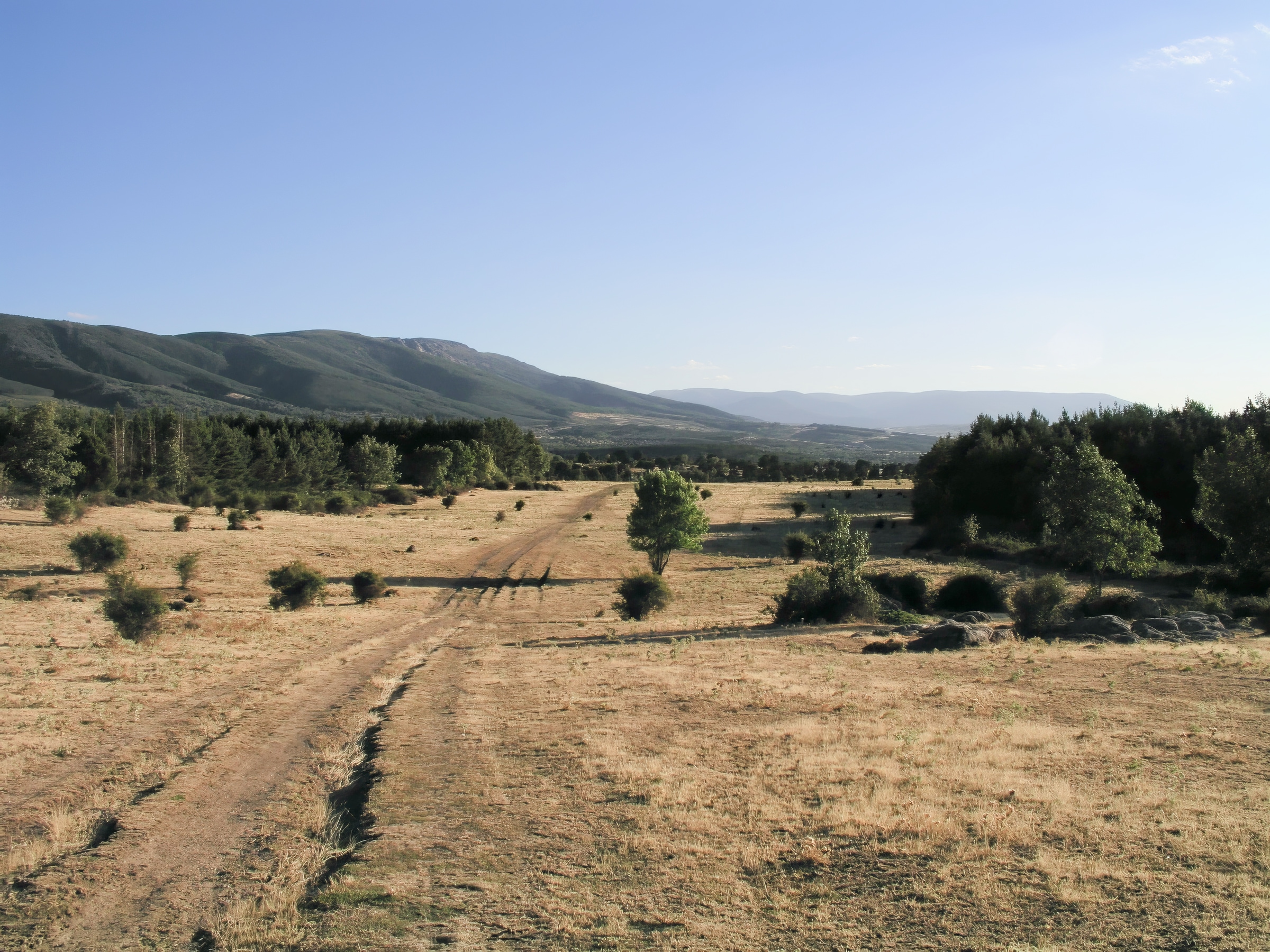
Royal cañada trail through Old Castile (Segovia, Spain)

As for the land itself, it was organized and highly regulated into various types due to a scarcity of pasturelands. There were: pastos comunales (communal lands), private lands, baldíos (vacant wooded areas) and dehesas, or fenced lands that could be privately owned. All these pasturelands could be used for a fee or tribute, unless used by the surrounding villagers in the case of communal lands, or could be rented to livestock owners. Most Spanish ganaderos (livestock owners) did not own their own land, having to rent or lease the land by paying tribute or rent. Most pasturelands had restrictions on the amount of livestock that could enter, or even the type of species, as in the dehesas boyales, or dehesas used only for oxen. A montazgo, a tribute or tax paid for the transit of livestock through villages, towns, lands or mountains, was also paid.

== History in North America ==
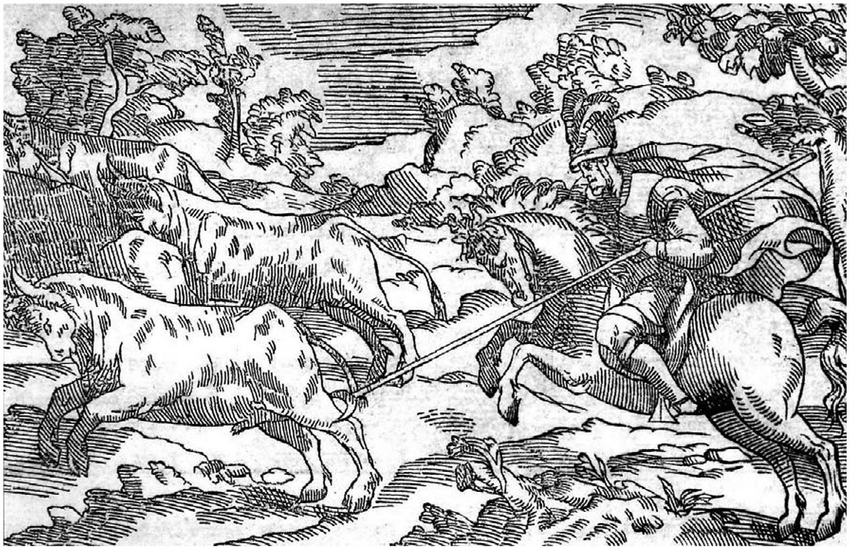
Cacería del Toro Cimarron (Hunting Wild Bulls in Colonial Mexico, 1582)

The origins of what we know today as ranching in North America date back to the 16th century when the Spaniards introduced cattle and horses to Mexico. Livestock raising had diverged in Mexico from what it had been in Spain due to an over abundance of land and, because of the rapid multiplication of livestock, an over abundance of cattle and horses. In a letter to the King of Spain in 1544, Cristóbal de Benavente, prosecutor of Mexico (fiscal de audiencia), wrote that livestock of all species were multiplying rapidly, almost double every 15 months.

Although all livestock species took root and multiplied rapidly, there was a preponderance of cattle, so much so that, soon after, there was more cattle in Mexico than in Spain. According to Spanish army captain, Bernardo de Vargas Machuca, out of all the kingdoms, Mexico was where cattle were the most abundant. Cattle had multiplied so much that, just in the Sotavento region of Veracruz alone, cattle had quintupled to around 2.5 million head in 1630 from half a million in 1570.

The Franciscan friar, Antonio de Ciudad Real, who accompanied friar Alonso de Ponce to New Spain in 1584, argued that the reason why cattle was so abundant in the Province of Mexico was because it was easier to produce and raise, at less cost and with less work, because pasturelands were abundant, the climate was temperate and there were no wolves or other predators to prey upon them as in Spain, multiplying so much that it seemed to be native to the land, that many men were able to brand more than 30 thousand calves a year.

Because it was a much greater territory, land was plentiful, thus, any Spanish laws that were applied back in Spain regarding pasturelands and land ownership were never applied. Initially, a generalized common grazing regime was established, in which all vacant land was free and open to all, as was the stubble after the harvest. This regime allowed cattle to multiply in a semi-wild state, with minimal intervention from man, diverging, once again, from Spanish tradition.

However, over time, the authorities were forced to recognize a somewhat stable occupation of the land by the first cattle barons. The first sites or sitios intended for cattle and other livestock were called Estancias (stays, stations), and were given in the form of grants upon verification of the occupation or "purchase" made from the Indians. These grants did not grant ownership, but rather the usufruct of the land, and were revocable if the beneficiary was absent. Thus, the cattle-barons reserved the exclusive use of the land, without actually owning it.

There were two types of estancias: estancias de ganado mayor (cattle and horse estancias) and estancias de ganado menor (sheep & goat estancias). Both types had to be square in shape, going from east to west. Cattle estancias had to be 1 league in length, on each side, or 5000 varas or 1750 hectares, approximately 4400 acres. While sheep and goat estancias had to measure 3333 varas in length or 780 hectares, approximately 2000 acres. The caballeria, the piece of land allotted to a Caballero and his mount, while not defined as estancia, had to be 43 hectares or approximately 110 acres. The Estancias de labor were the ones that combined livestock raising with agriculture. However, the estancias far exceeded the established limits, since fencing the land was prohibited (unlike in Spain), allowing the cattle to graze freely in the intermediate spaces and, thus, allowing the cattle-barons to annex the land. Most Cattle barons usually possessed a set of estancias that were situated side by side, encompassing a vast area. Estancia was also the name of the houses or “cottages” where the vaqueros (cowherds) would gather.

By 1554, there were 60 estancias de ganado mayor in the Valley of Toluca in central Mexico, with more than 150,000 head of cattle and horses. It’s estimated that just in central Mexico, there were around 1.3 million head of cattle by 1620. Between 1550 and 1619, 103 cattle estancias (+444,789 acres), 118 sheep estancias (approximately 200,000 acres); 42 mare estancias (186,000 acres) and 130 caballerías (approximately 14000 acres) were granted in the Huasteca region of San Luis Potosí.

The earliest cattle estancias were located in the highlands of Central Mexico and in the lowlands along the Gulf of Mexico. Because the lands in central Mexico were beginning to be insufficient, the cattle barons were forced to relocate. According to Franciscan friar, Juan de Torquemada, cattle barons began to move operations north of Central Mexico, to the valleys and lands stretching for more than 200 leagues (500 miles), from Querétaro in the Bajío region, passing through Zacatecas, to the valley of Guadiana (Durango). By 1582 there were more than 100,000 head of cattle, 200,000 sheep and 10,000 horses grazing in the San Juan del Río valley in Querétaro. In 1576 there were around 30,000 head of cattle in Nueva Vizcaya and by the end of the 18th century, just in the Bolsón de Mapimí alone, there were 325,000 head of cattle, 230,000 horses, 49,000 mules, 7,000 donkeys, 2 million sheep and 250,000 goats. In the early 17th century, prior to the Tepehuán uprising of 1616, there were in the vicinity of the city of Durango, capital of Nueva Vizcaya, more than 200,000 head of cattle and horses, from where thousands of steers were driven to Mexico City. By the late 18th century and early 19th century, there were more than 5 million head of cattle in the province of Xalisco in the Intendancy of Guadalajara, the greatest cattle ranching region of all New Spain, producing between 300,000 and 350,000 calves a year. From both regions, Guadalajara and Durango, more than 50,000 head of cattle were taken out and driven each year to New Spain, to the cattle markets of Mexico City, Puebla and surrounding areas in the 18th century. The province of Sonora had 121,000 head of cattle in 1783, the province of California had 68,000 head of cattle and 2187 horses in 1802, up from 25000 cattle in 1792.

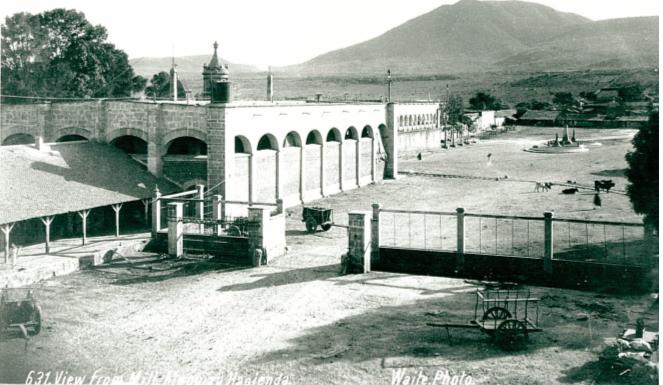
Atequiza Hacienda in Jalisco, a major hacienda de labor that combined farming and cattle raising. It contained its own theater

Prior to the establishment of rancho as a cattle-farm, the term seems to have been used to refer to provisional houses, like those of the indigenous people, or a camping site. Similarly, the term “estancia” appears to have been used originally to denote a point where herdsmen and their herds finally came to rest, or as the Spanish-Mexican horseman and historian, Don Juan Suárez de Peralta, described it in 1580: “the houses where the vaqueros gather or assemble, where they have corrals to enclose some cattle to brand and mark.”

The rancho under the Mexican definition, as we know it today, would emerge sometime in the 17th century, being defined as: “A small hacienda, with a small amount of land for cultivation, a small workforce, and a proportionate amount of tools and equipment; different from the estancia or big hacienda which has more land, a bigger workforce, more oxen, and more tools and equipment.” This definition from 1687, shows that both terms, estancia and hacienda, were synonymous; apparently the term estancia begins to fall into disuse in the country, being replaced by the term hacienda, sometime in the early 18th century. The French historian, François Chevalier, states that the terms estancia and caballería were gradually divested of their original meanings and ultimately restricted to units of measurement, in favor of the term hacienda which had become popular. Ultimately, according to Chevalier, a hacienda was just a combination of cattle estancias and caballerías into one huge rural estate.

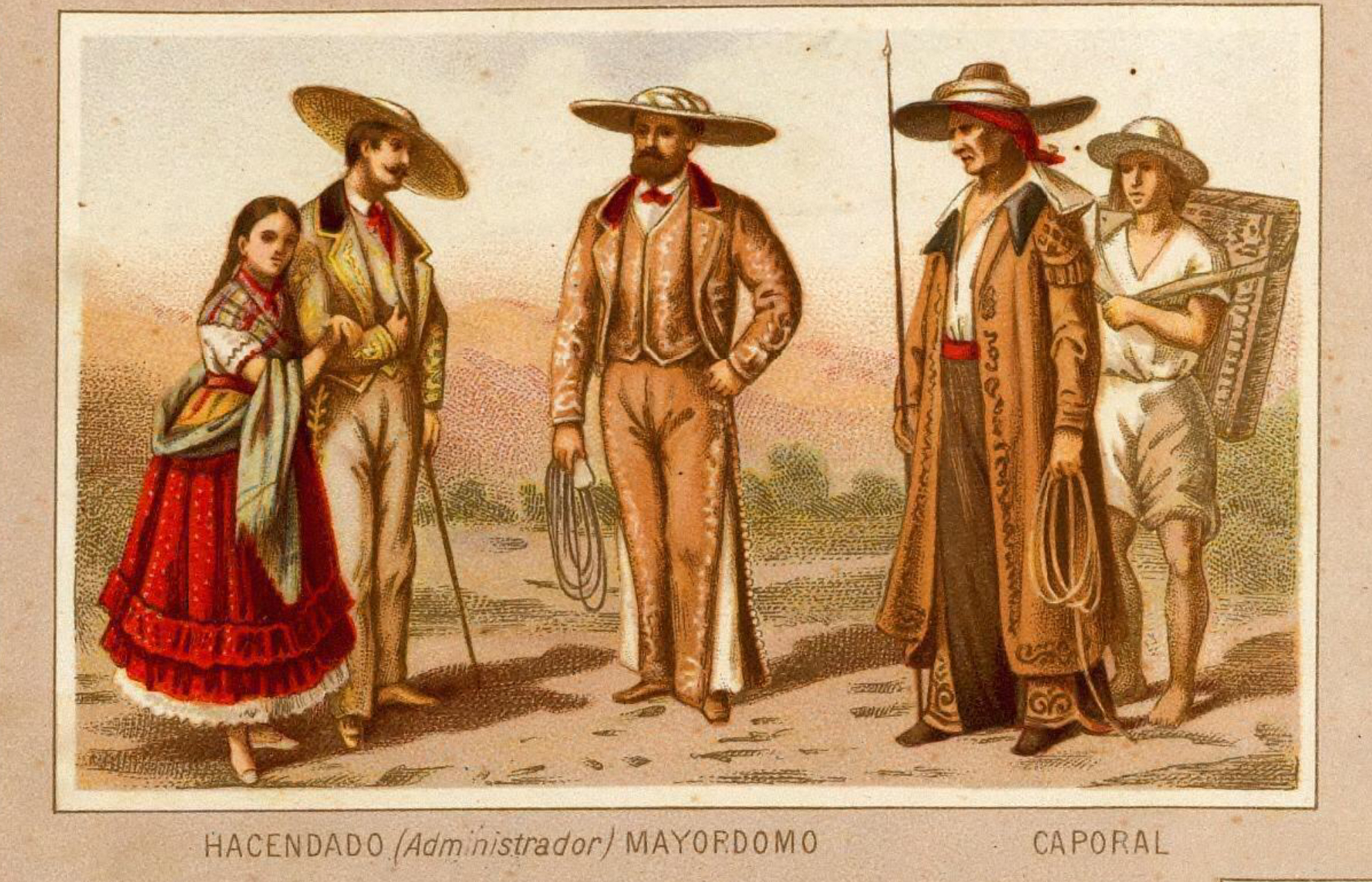
Hierarchy of a Mexican cattle hacienda: The Hacienda Administrator or Hacienda owner, the Mayordomo, and the Caporal, the captain of the vaqueros (cowherds)

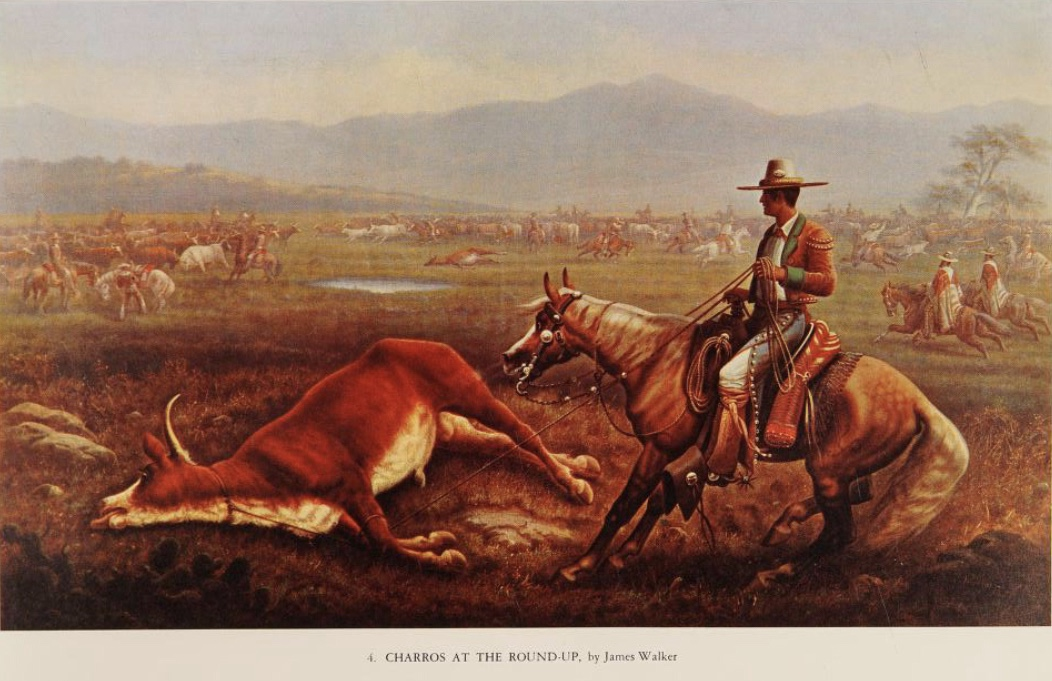
Mexican Vaquero (cowherd or cattle-herder)

Towards the 19th century, ranchos were either small independent cattle farms or were dependent of a hacienda. Both haciendas and ranchos were divided according to type. In the case of haciendas, there were two types, the “hacienda de beneficio” and the “hacienda de campo”. The “hacienda de beneficio” were mining operations, typically silver. The “haciendas de campo” were the landed estates, and were divided into two types: the hacienda de labor (agricultural estate) and the hacienda de ganado (livestock estate); the latter was divided into two types, the hacienda de ganado mayor (cattle estate) and the hacienda de ganado menor (sheep and goat estate). Ranchos were either “de ganado mayor” (cattle), “de caballada o mulada” (horses or mules), or “de ganado menor” (sheep and goats). The inhabitants of haciendas and ranchos of the high-lands and interior of the country were called rancheros, and were tenants or worked for the landowner; rancheros who took care of the livestock were vaqueros, while those who lived and worked as vaqueros in the haciendas of Veracruz, in the low-lands, were called Jarochos.

The largest hacienda/ranch in the world during Colonial times was the Sanchez Navarro estate with more than 16 million acres. The hacienda “San Ignacio del Buey” owned by the friar Don Juan Caballero in the Huasteca region of San Luis Potosi had, at its height, 600,000 hectares or 1.5 million acres. The hacienda “San Juan Evangelista del Mezquite” owned by Felipe de Barragán in the same region was 450,000 hectares or 1.2 million acres at its height in the 18th century. One of the largest cattle-barons in 16th century Mexico was Don Diego de Ibarra, governor of Nueva Vizcaya, who in the year 1586 had branded more than 33,000 calves at his Trujillo hacienda in Zacatecas where, at the time of his death in 1600, owned more than 130,000 head of cattle and more than 4000 horses. His successor as governor, Don Rodrigo del Rio de la Loza, had branded at his Poanas hacienda more than 42,000 calves that same year.

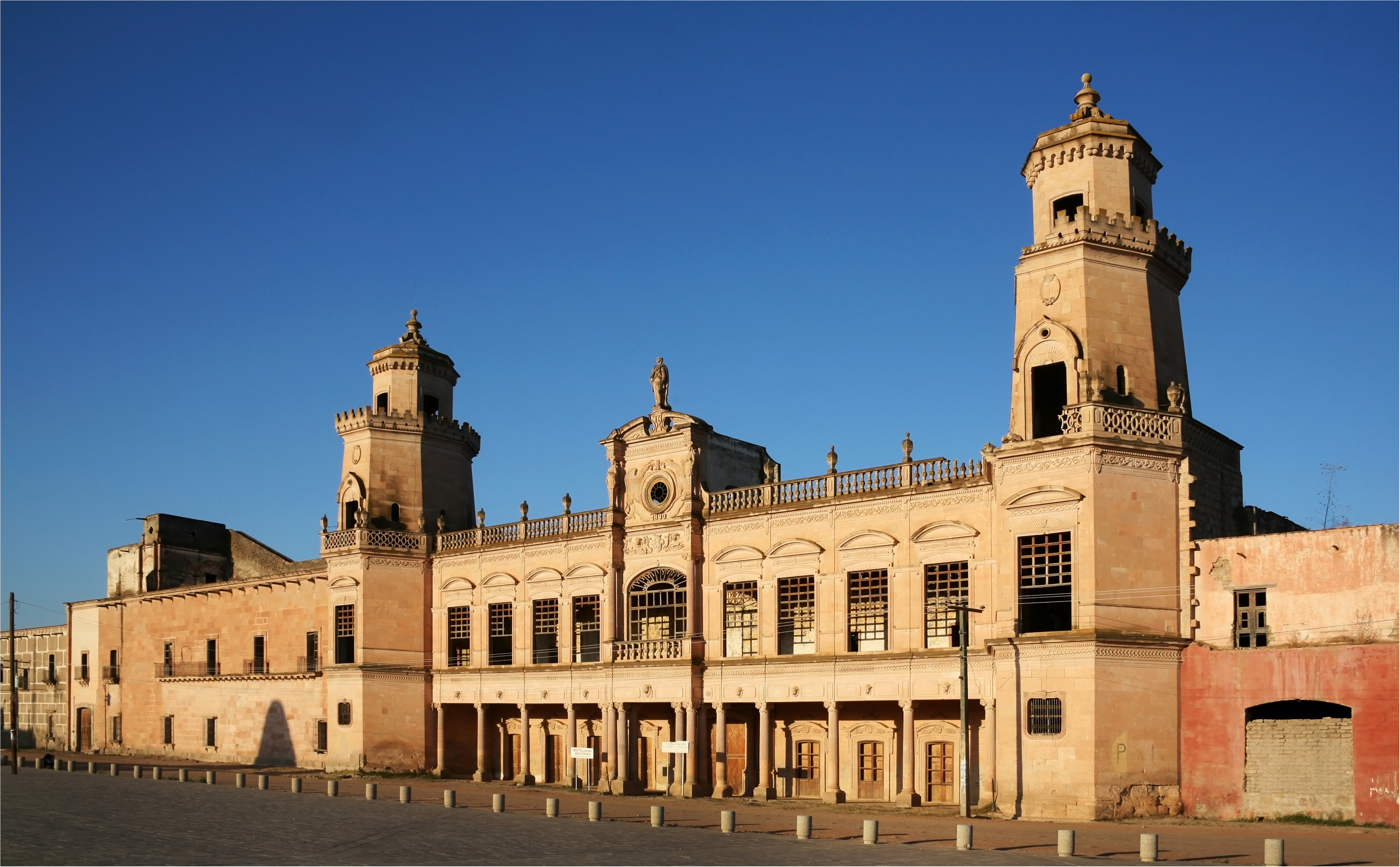
Jaral de Berrios, probably the most important and wealthiest hacienda in Mexico in Colonial times and early 19th century.

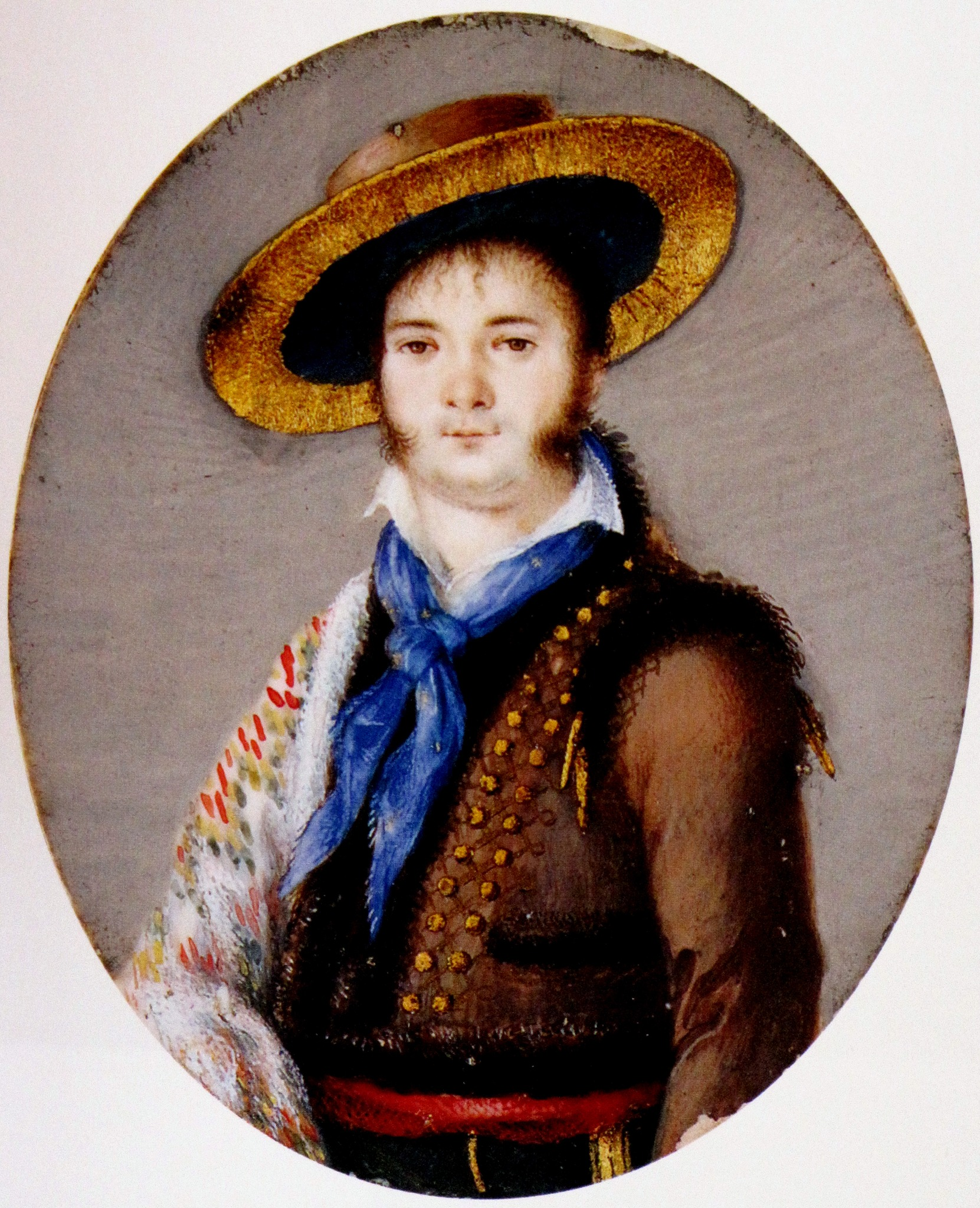
The Count and Marquis, Don Juan Nepomuceno de Moncada y Berrio (1781–1859).

The wealthiest, most important and renowned hacienda was the “Jaral de Berrio”. It was owned by the Count and Marquis Juan Nepomuceno de Moncada y Berrio in Guanajuato, considered the wealthiest man in Mexico in the 1830s and possibly the largest landowner in the world at the time. His stretched for more than 200 miles from Guanajuato to Zacatecas. Included in his holdings were more than 3 million head of livestock of cattle, horses, sheep and goats. El Jaral was an influential hacienda, of which songs, poems, and proverbs were written. The horses and fighting bulls of El Jaral de Berrio were renowned in New Spain-Mexico, leading to the Mexican ranchero proverb: Pa’ los Toros del Jaral los Caballos de allá mesmo (For the Bulls of Jaral, only the Horses from there too).

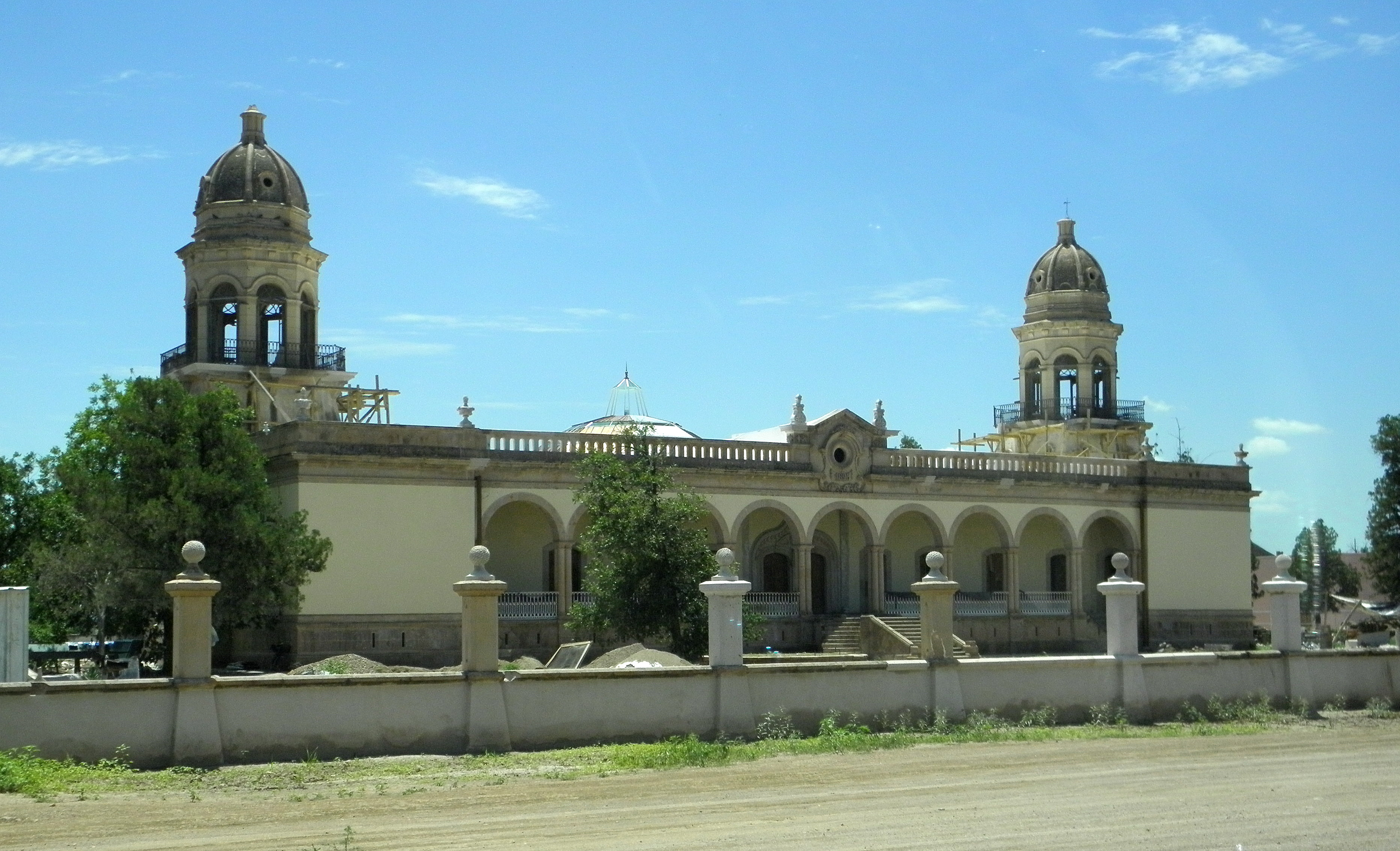
Quinta Carolina: the Main Manor House of the Terrazas family in Chihuahua.

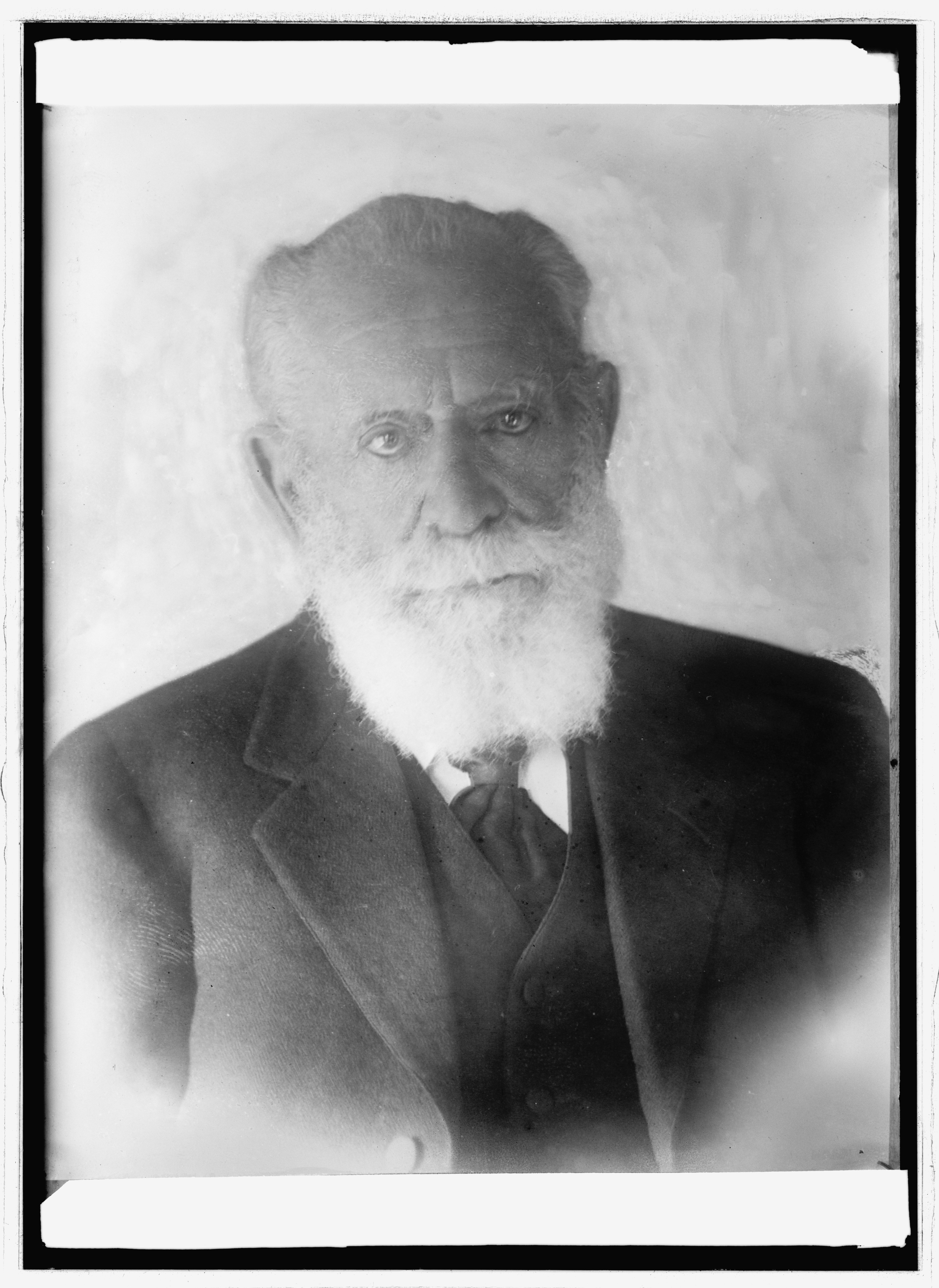
Don Luis Terrazas, hacendado from Chihuahua (state).

The largest hacienda/ranch in the world, prior to the Mexican Revolution of 1910, was the Terrazas family estate headed by Don Luis Terrazas in the state of Chihuahua, with more than 8 million acres in size (some sources say 15 million acres) stretching for more than 160 miles north to south and 200 miles east to west. At its height in the early 1900s, Terrazas owned more than 1 million head of cattle, 700,000 sheep, and 200,000 horses. It employed more than 2000 workers of which 1000 were vaqueros. It was the only ranch in the world that had its own slaughtering and packing plant at the time.

=== United States ===
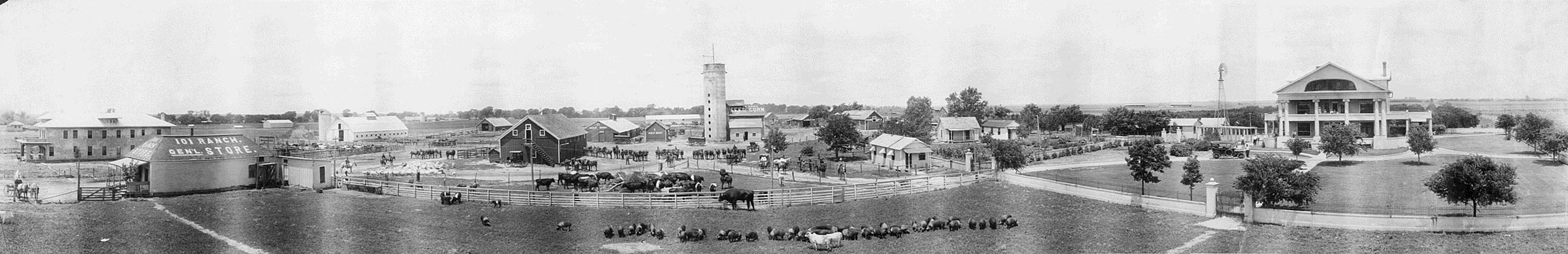
The historic 101 Ranch in Oklahoma showing the ranchhouse, corrals, and out-buildings

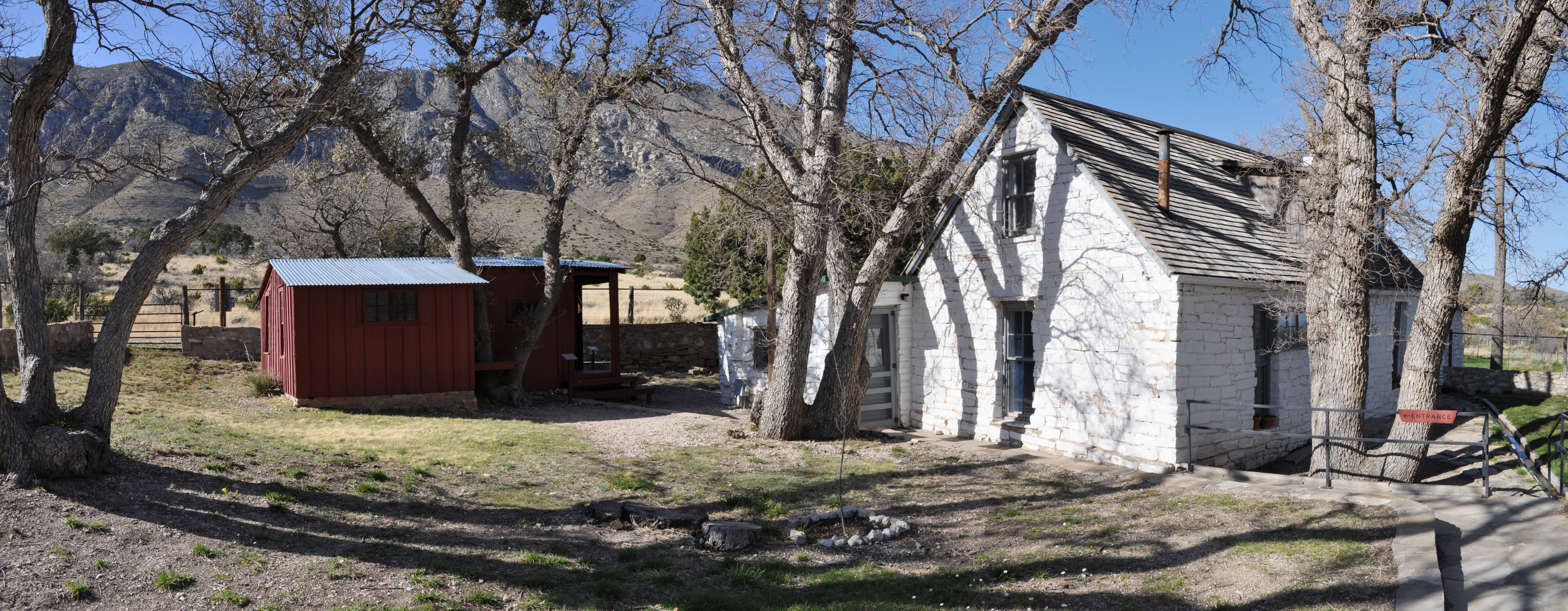
Frijole Ranch (c. 1876) is part of Guadalupe Mountains National Park in west Texas, United States.

As settlers from the United States moved west, they brought cattle breeds developed on the east coast and in Europe along with them, and adapted their management to the drier lands of the west by borrowing key elements of the Spanish vaquero culture.

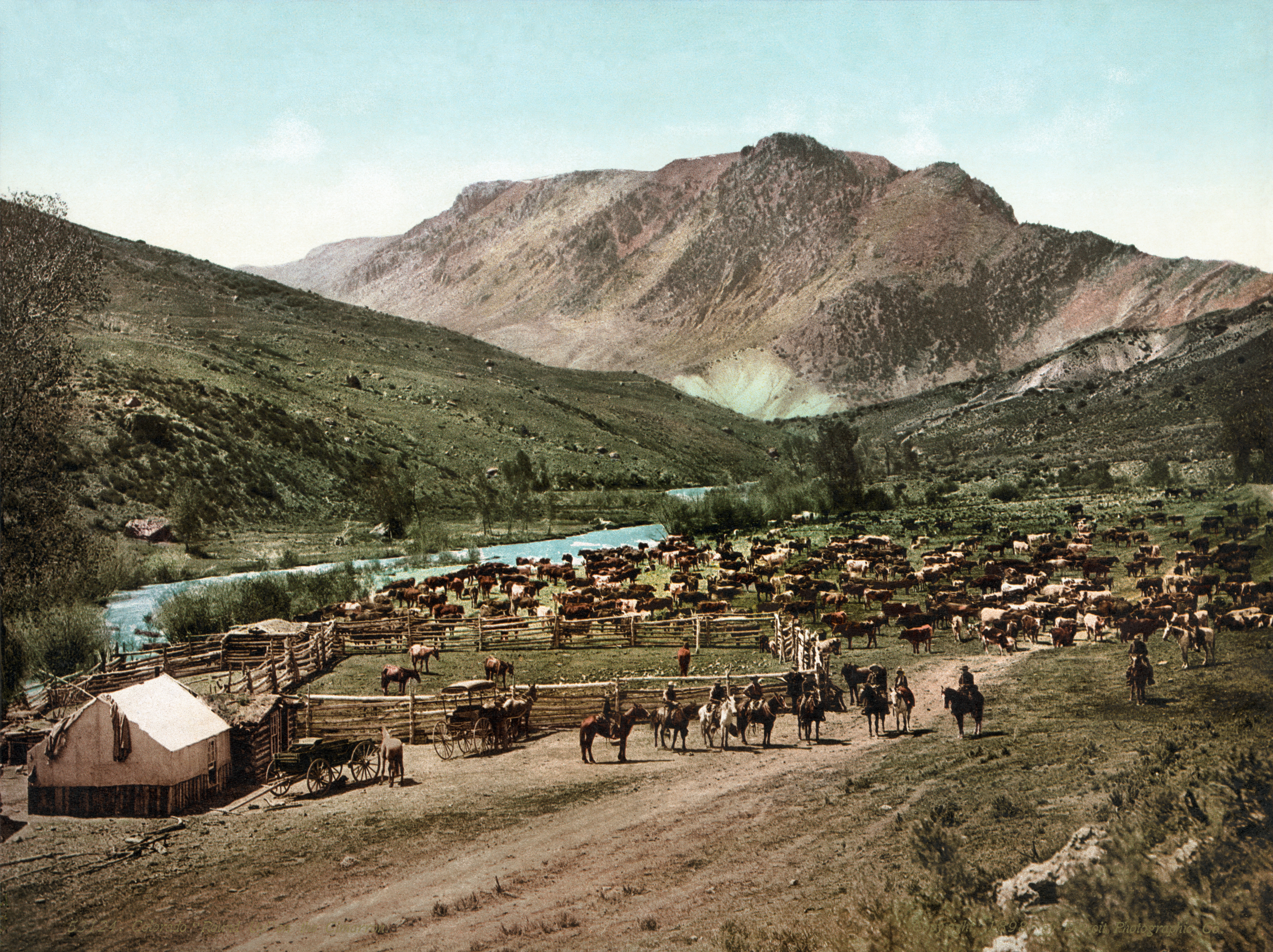
An 1898 photochrom of a round-up in or near the town of Cimarron, Colorado

However, there were cattle on the eastern seaboard. Deep Hollow Ranch, 110 miles (180 km) east of New York City in Montauk, New York, claims to be the first ranch in the United States, having continuously operated since 1658. The ranch makes the somewhat debatable claim of having the oldest cattle operation in what today is the United States, though cattle had been run in the area since European settlers purchased land from the Indian people of the area in 1643. Although there were substantial numbers of cattle on Long Island, as well as the need to herd them to and from common grazing lands on a seasonal basis, the cattle handlers actually lived in houses built on the pasture grounds, and cattle were ear-marked for identification, rather than being branded. The only actual "cattle drives" held on Long Island consisted of one drive in 1776, when the island's cattle were moved in a failed attempt to prevent them from being captured during the Revolutionary War, and three or four drives in the late 1930s, when area cattle were herded down Montauk Highway to pasture ground near Deep Hollow Ranch.

=== The open range ===
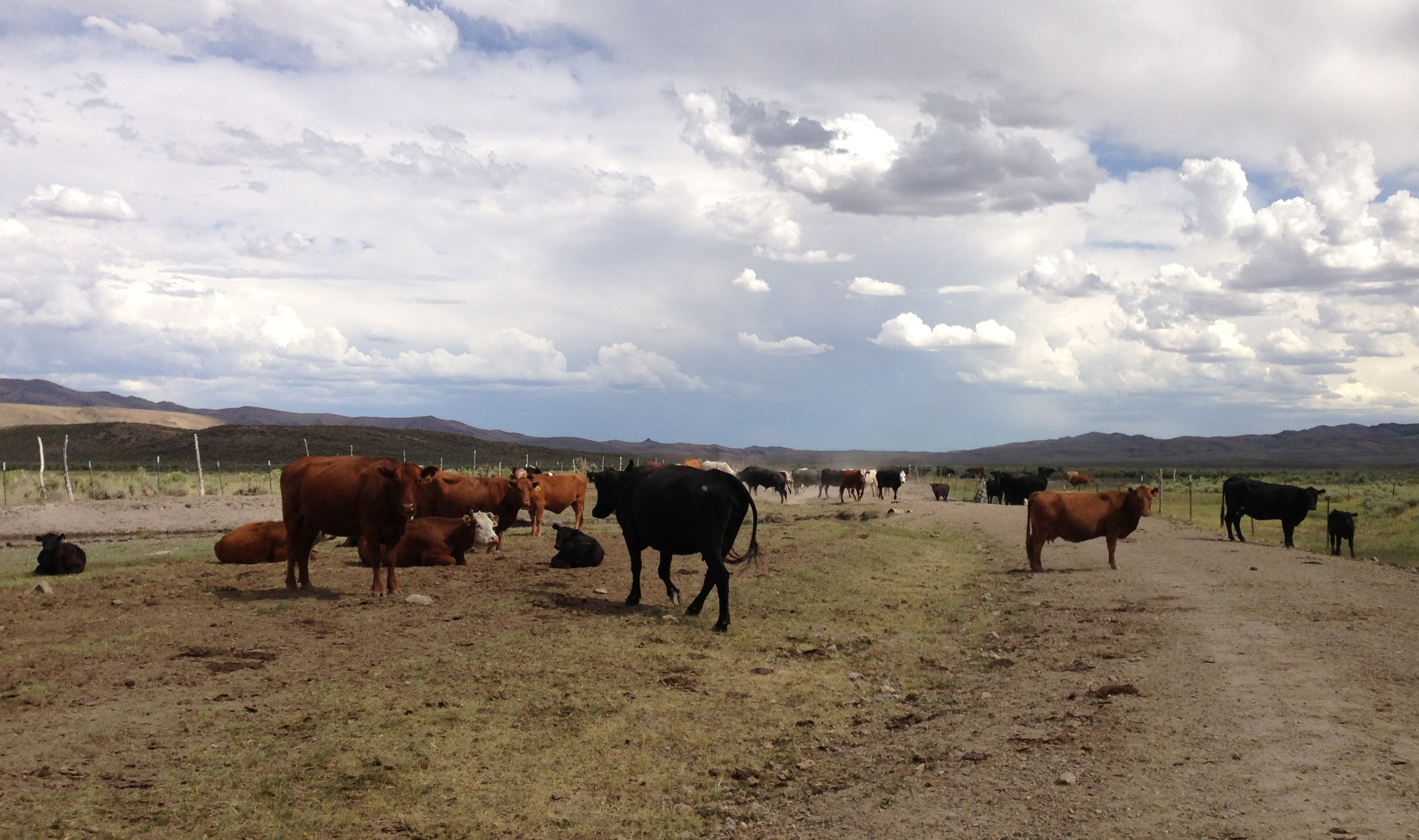
Cattle near the Bruneau River in Elko County, Nevada

The prairie and desert lands of what today is Mexico and the western United States were well-suited to "open range" grazing. For example, American bison had been a mainstay of the diet for the Native Americans in the Great Plains for centuries. Likewise, cattle and other livestock were simply turned loose in the spring after their young were born and allowed to roam with little supervision and no fences, then rounded up in the fall, with the mature animals driven to market and the breeding stock brought close to the ranch headquarters for greater protection in the winter. The use of livestock branding allowed the cattle owned by different ranchers to be identified and sorted. Beginning with the settlement of Texas in the 1840s, and expansion both north and west from that time, through the Civil War and into the 1880s, ranching dominated western economic activity.

Along with ranchers came the need for agricultural crops to feed both humans and livestock, and hence many farmers also came west along with ranchers. Many operations were "diversified", with both ranching and farming activities taking place. With the Homestead Act of 1862, more settlers came west to set up farms. This created some conflict, as increasing numbers of farmers needed to fence off fields to prevent cattle and sheep from eating their crops. Barbed wire, invented in 1874, gradually made inroads in fencing off privately owned land, especially for homesteads. There was some reduction of land on the Great Plains open to grazing.

=== End of the open range ===
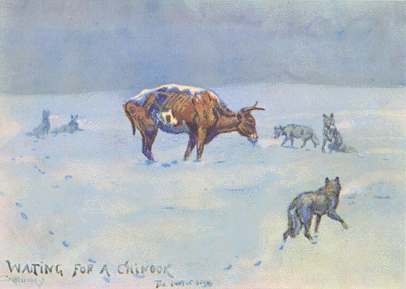
The severe winter of 1886–87 brought an end to the open range. Waiting for a Chinook, by C.M. Russell.

The end of the open range was not brought about by a reduction in land due to crop farming, but by overgrazing. Cattle stocked on the open range created a tragedy of the commons as each rancher sought increased economic benefit by grazing too many animals on public lands that "nobody" owned. However, being a non-native species, the grazing patterns of ever-increasing numbers of cattle slowly reduced the quality of the rangeland, in spite of the simultaneous massive slaughter of American bison that occurred. The winter of 1886–87 was one of the most severe on record, and livestock that were already stressed by reduced grazing died by the thousands. Many large cattle operations went bankrupt, and others suffered severe financial losses. Thus, after this time, ranchers also began to fence off their land and negotiated individual grazing leases with the American government so that they could keep better control of the pasture land available to their own animals.

=== Ranching in Hawaii ===
Ranching in Hawaii developed independently of that in the continental United States. In colonial times, Capt. George Vancouver gave several head of cattle to the Hawaiian king, Pai`ea Kamehameha, and by the early 19th century, they had multiplied considerably, to the point that they were wreaking havoc throughout the countryside. About 1812, John Parker, a sailor who had jumped ship and settled in the islands, received permission from Kamehameha to capture the wild cattle and develop a beef industry.

The Hawaiian style of ranching originally included capturing wild cattle by driving them into pits dug in the forest floor. Once tamed somewhat by hunger and thirst, they were hauled out up a steep ramp, and tied by their horns to the horns of a tame, older steer (or ox) and taken to fenced-in areas. The industry grew slowly under the reign of Kamehameha's son Liholiho (Kamehameha II). When Liholiho's brother, Kauikeaouli (Kamehameha III), visited California, then still a part of Mexico, he was impressed with the skill of the Mexican vaqueros. In 1832, he invited several to Hawaii to teach the Hawaiian people how to work cattle.

The Hawaiian cowboy came to be called the paniolo, a Hawaiianized pronunciation of español. Even today, the traditional Hawaiian saddle and many other tools of the ranching trade have a distinctly Mexican look, and many Hawaiian ranching families still carry the surnames of vaqueros who made Hawaii their home.

== Ranching in South America ==
In the colonial period, from the pampas regions of South America all the way to the Minas Gerais state in Brazil, including the semi-arid pampas of Argentina and the south of Brazil, were often well-suited to ranching, and a tradition developed that largely paralleled that of Mexico and the United States. The gaucho culture of Argentina, Brazil and Uruguay are among the cattle ranching traditions born during the period. The importation of cattle was fundamental to Iberian colonialism and led to a “civilization of leather.” There were major consequences from importing livestock, such as ecological and landscape changes. However, in the 20th century, cattle raising expanded into less-suitable areas of the Pantanal. Particularly in Brazil, the 20th century marked the rapid growth of deforestation, as rain forest lands were cleared by slash and burn methods that allowed grass to grow for livestock, but also led to the depletion of the land within only a few years. These nutrient deficient lands attract ranchers, and this will cause the area to stay desolate because the livestock will generally graze and keep foliage low to nonexistent.

Many indigenous peoples of the rain forest opposed the slash and burn form of cattle ranching and protested the forest being burnt down. This is due to factors like the cheaper slash and burn technique replacing chemical fertilizers or environmentally friendly methods, resulting in the soil losing nutrients within 2-3 years and the land becoming less inhabitable due to mass clearings of the rain forests for agricultural and livestock usage as mentioned before. An alternative agricultural method practiced by indigenous peoples is sustainable shifting cultivation. This method does not result in the soil losing nutrients but has longer fallow times (10-20 years as opposed to the slash and burn fallow time, which is 3-5 years or even less) and will not sustain large populations. This conflict is still a concern in the region today and is a key point in discussions about carbon emission levels and pollution.

== Ranches outside the Americas ==
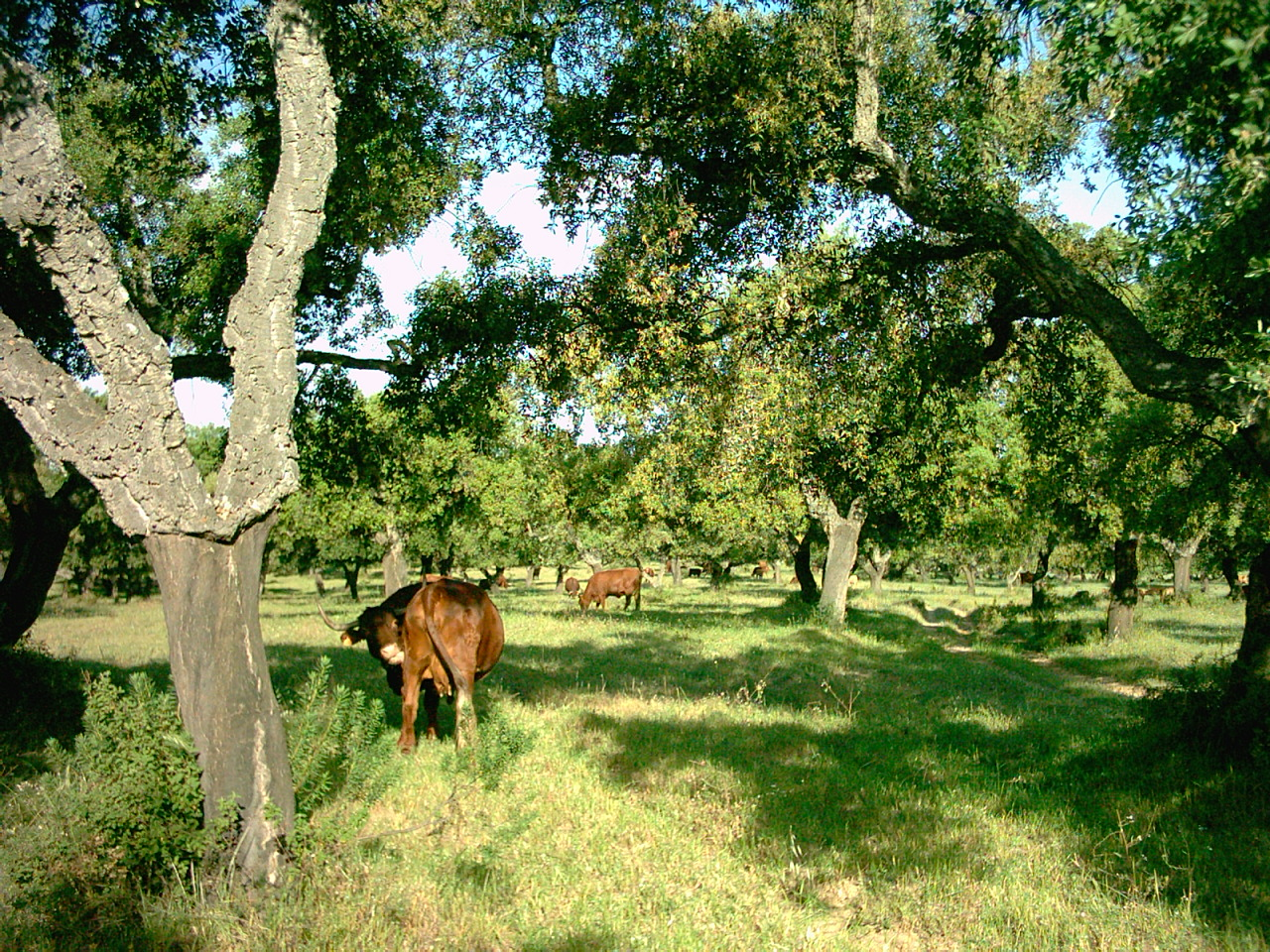
Cattle in a dehesa in Bollullos Par del Condado, Spain

In Spain, where the origins of ranching can be traced, there are ganaderías operating on dehesa-type land, where fighting bulls are raised. However, ranch-type properties are not seen to any significant degree in the rest of western Europe, where there is far less land area and sufficient rainfall allows the raising of cattle on much smaller farms.

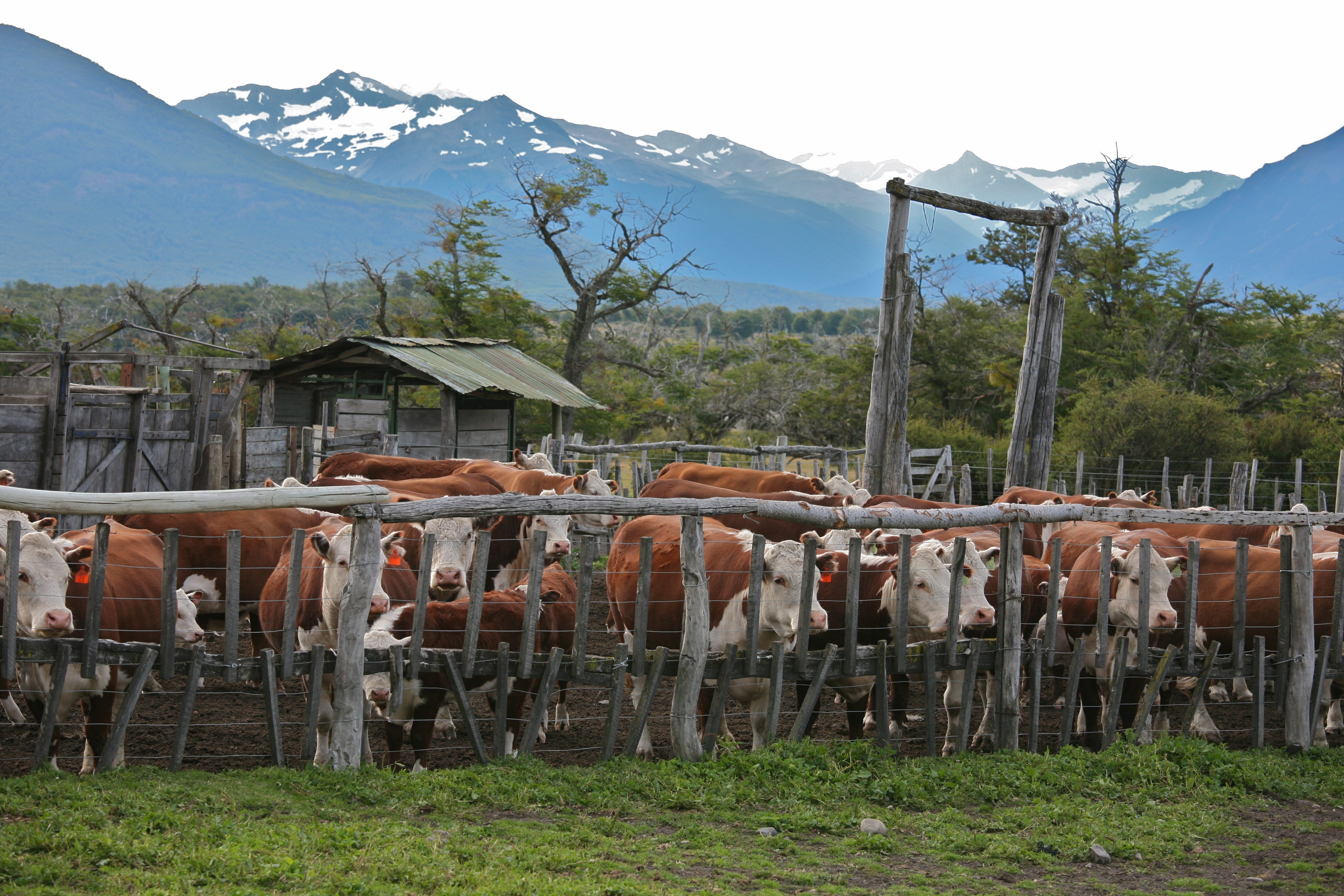
Aike Ranch, El Calafate

In Australia, a rangeland property is a station (originally in the sense of a place where stock were temporarily stationed). In almost all cases, these are either cattle stations or sheep stations. The largest cattle stations in the world are located in Australia's dry outback rangelands. Owners of these stations are usually known as graziers or pastoralists, especially if they reside on the property. Employees are generally known as stockmen/stockwomen, jackaroos/jillaroos, and ringers (rather than cowboys). Some Australian cattle stations are larger than 10,000 km^{2}, with the greatest being Anna Creek Station which measures 23,677 km^{2} in area (approximately eight times the largest US Ranch). Anna Creek is owned by S Kidman & Co.

The equivalent terms in New Zealand are run and station.

In South Africa, similar extensive holdings are usually known as a farm (occasionally also ranch) in South African English and plaas in Afrikaans.

== See also ==
- Animal husbandry
- Cattle station
- Garden tools
- Estancia
- Holistic management
- Homestead (buildings)
- Intensive animal farming § Cattle
- List of Ranches and Stations
- Movie ranch
- Pastoralism
- Ranch school
- Ranch-style house
- Sheep station
