= Otomi language (Jalisco) =

Extinct language spoken in Jalisco, Mexico

Otomi
- Native to: Mexico
- Region: Jalisco
- Extinct: (date missing)
- Language family: unclassified

Language codes
- ISO 639-3: None (mis)

Otomi is an extinct, unclassified Mesoamerican language formerly spoken in the state of Jalisco, Mexico.

It is uncertain if the Otomi language of Jalisco is related to the Otomi language spoken elsewhere in Mexico, or if it is an unrelated language with the same name. One possible explanation is that Otomi allies of the Spanish, hailing from central Mexico, were settled here as a buffer against the Chichimeca.

== Geographic distribution ==
Otomi was spoken in the province of Amula, in the communities of Cuzalapa (now in the municipality of Cuautitlán de García Barragán), Tuxcacuesco, and Zapotitlán de Vadillo. Nahuatl was also spoken in these communities.

People known as "Otomíes" are historically attested in parts of what is now the state of Nayarit, particularly around Ahuacatlán and Xalisco. However, Peter Gerhard suggests that this was another name for the Tecuales, who spoke a language closely related to Huichol.

== Sources ==
The use of the Otomi language was described in a relación geográfica made in 1579 by Francisco de Agüero, alcalde mayor of the province of Amula. The relación also mentions an Otomi name, Ercape, said to mean "a flea that itches greatly".

The language is also mentioned, though not named, by Antonio de Ciudad Real, who visited Tuxcacuesco and Zapotitlán with Alonso Ponce in 1587. He called it "a unique language" (Spanish: una lengua particular).

== Extinction ==
Otomi became extinct due to the community shifting from using Otomi to using Nahuatl as their primary language. Nahuatl had become a lingua franca in the pre-Columbian era, being used as the administrative language of the Aztec Empire and as a trade language beyond the empire's borders, and was subsequently also promoted by the Spaniards after the Spanish conquest. Nearby languages that went extinct in similar circumstances include Cochin, Tiam (both spoken around Tuxpan), Tamazultec (spoken in Tamazula de Gordiano), Sayultec, and Zapotec. Sayultec and Tamazultec might have been varieties of Nahuatl. Peter Gerhard and Donald Brand considered Zapoteco to be an Otomi dialect, along with Bapame, Pino, and Amultec.
