= Amula =

Amula may refer to:

- Amula, Estonia, a village in Estonia
- Amula, New Spain, a county-level jurisdiction in colonial New Spain
