= Zapotitlán de Vadillo =

- Municipality and town
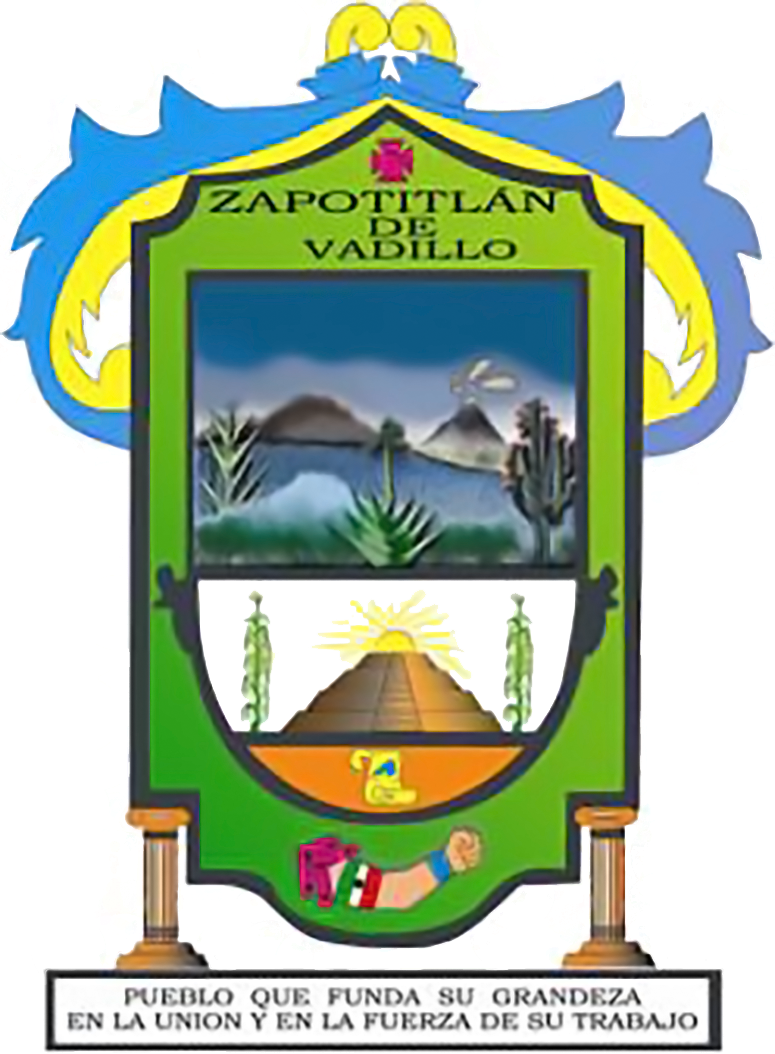
- Coat of arms

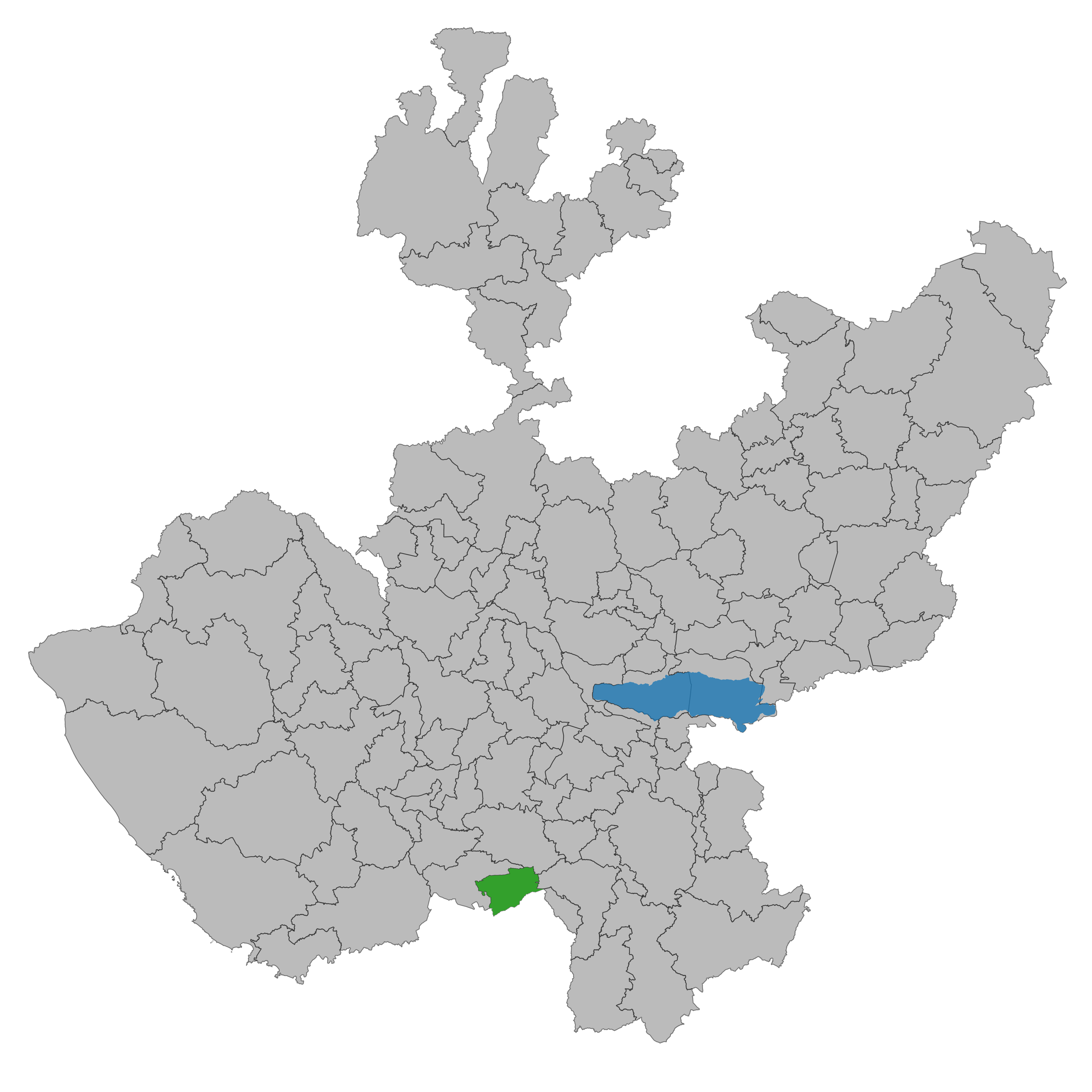
- Location of the municipality in Jalisco

- Location in Mexico
- Coordinates: 19°25′N 103°36′W
- Country: Mexico
- State: Jalisco

Area
  - Total: 305.8 km^{2} (118.1 sq mi)
  - Town: 1.31 km^{2} (0.51 sq mi)

Population (2020 census)
  - Total: 7,466
  - Density: 24.41/km^{2} (63.23/sq mi)
  - Town: 4,214
  - Town density: 3,220/km^{2} (8,330/sq mi)
- Time zone: UTC-6 (Central Standard Time)

Zapotitlán de Vadillo is a town and municipality, in Jalisco in central-western Mexico. The municipality covers an area of 305.8 km^{2}.

As of 2005, the municipality had a total population of 6,345.

The indigenous inhabitants of this area originally spoke the extinct, unclassified Zapoteco and Otomi languages. During the colonial era it was part of the province of Amula.
