= Amula, New Spain =

Amula was a colonial province of New Spain from the mid-16th century until 1821. It corresponded with the modern municipalities of Zapotitlán de Vadillo, Tuxcacuesco, Cuautitlán de García Barragán and Tolimán.

Prior to the Spanish incursion the area was split between the states of Amole, Cozolapa, Tuxcacuexco and possibly Tzapotitlan. Amole also had two dependent states, Copalla and Teotitlan.

The indigenous inhabitants primarily spoke languages of the western Otomi group which was distinct from the language of the Otomi people of modern Hidalgo although it may have been related. The main languages were Amultecan, Bapame, Pino and Zapoteco (not to be confused with the Zapotec languages of Oaxaca). Amole and its neighboring states defeated Purépecha attempts to invade the area early in the 16th century.

The Spanish took over the area in 1523. By the early 1530s it was formed into the province of Amyla y Tuscacuesco although the name was shortened to just Amula. Religious change in the area was slower with the Franciscans first arriving in the 1540s but no permanent church organization formed until 1579.

== Sources ==
- Gerhard, Peter. Guide to the Historical Geography of New Spain. Cambridge: University Press, 1972. p. 46-48.
