= Vittorio Bottego =

Italian army officer and explorer of Africa

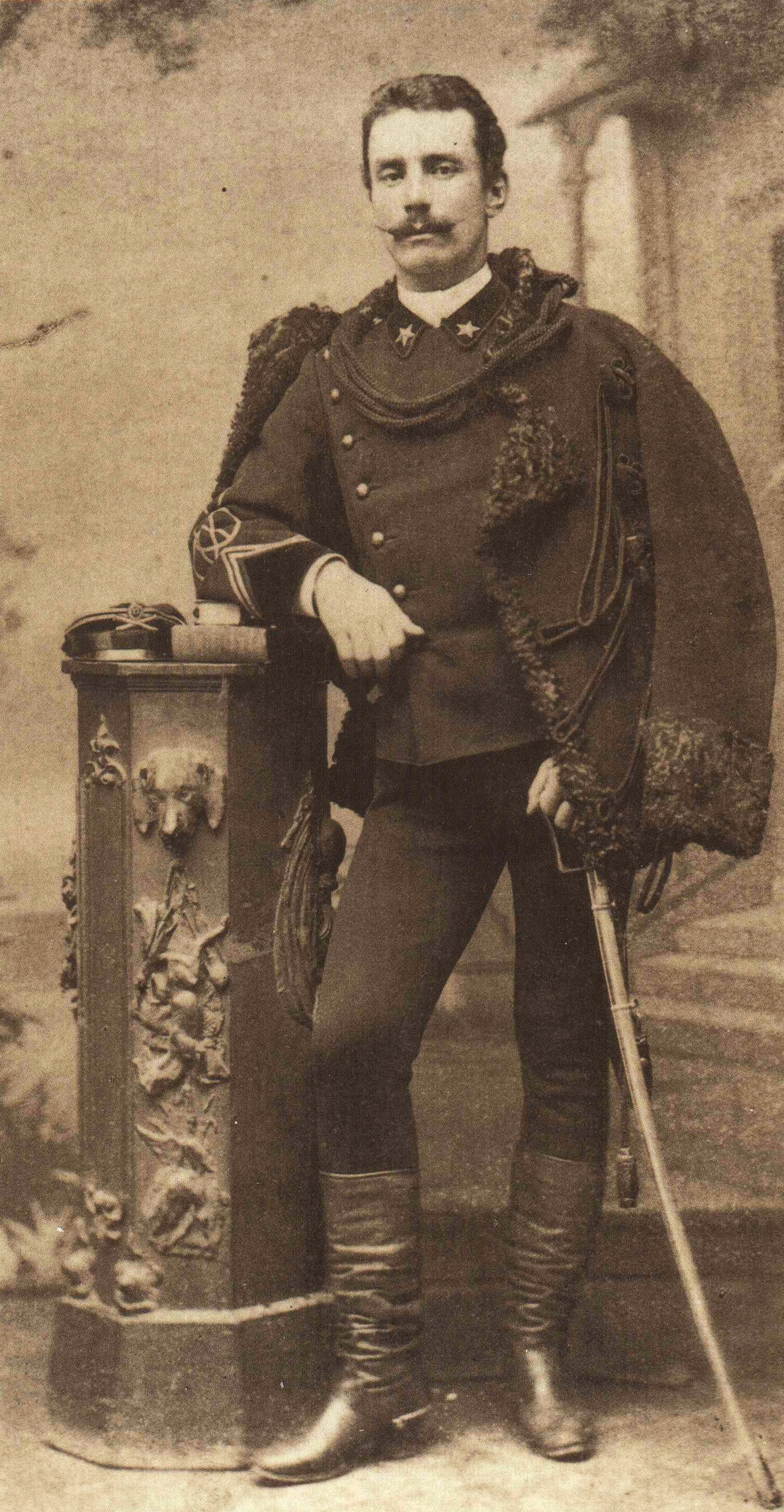
- Vittorio Bottego in 1889
- Born: 29 July 1860; Parma, Duchy of Parma
- Died: 17 March 1897 (aged 36); Dhaga Roba, Ethiopian Empire
- Occupations: Army officer; Explorer
- Known for: Being one of the first Western explorers of Jubaland in the Horn of Africa
- Parent(s): Agostino Bottego and Maria Bottego (née Asinelli)
- Awards: Gold Medal of Military Valor
- Military career
- Allegiance: Kingdom of Italy
- Branch: Royal Italian Army
- Service years: 1887–1897
- Rank: Capitano

Vittorio Bottego (Italian pronunciation: [vitˈtɔːrjo ˈbɔtteɡo]; Parma, 29 July 1860 – Dhaga Roba, 17 March 1897) was an Italian army officer and one of the first Western explorers of Jubaland and southern Ethiopia, where he led two expeditions. He was the first European explorer to follow the course of the lower Omo River to its confluence with Lake Turkana and to reach Lake Abaya, which he called Lake Margherita after Queen Margherita of Savoy, the wife of King Humbert I of Italy.

== Expeditions ==
In his first expedition Bottego concentrated on tracing the channels of the tributaries of the Ganale Doria, which he named after the Italian biologist Giacomo Doria. With Captain Matteo Grixoni, Bottego left Bardere on 30 September 1892, with one hundred and twenty-four men. They reached the Shebelle River at Imi on 7 November. After eight days they crossed the river, entering the country of the Arsi Oromo, who proved hostile to Bottego. He passed through Arkebla and reached the Ganale Guracha ("Black Ganale") on 11 December, along whose banks he led his men upstream for 20 days.

Concluding that this was not the main stream of the river, Bottego left the river in a west-south-western direction until he reached the Ganale Doria, or the main fork of the Ganale, on 16 January 1893. Sick with fever, here Bottego was left by Grixoni who marched for the coast on 15 February with 30 men. Four days after Grixoni left, Bottego pushed inland as far as Mount Fakes, but unwilling to encounter raiding parties of the Ethiopians, he returned to the camp where Grixoni had left him. Bottego then crossed the tract separating him from the Dawa, and ascended that river until lack of provisions compelled him to retrace his steps. His party reached the Ganale Doria once more after six forced marches, in the course of which eleven men died of hunger. Two more died in camp from exhaustion, and two were drowned while hunting hippopotamuses.

In his second expedition (1895–1897), Bottego ventured into the then unknown region of the upper Juba, Lake Turkana and the Sobat. He was the first European explorer to follow the course of the lower Omo River to its confluence with Lake Turkana. He reached and first found Lake Abaya, which he renamed Lake Margherita after Queen Margherita of Savoy wife of King Umberto I of Italy.

He then tried to return through Ethiopia, unaware that the country was at war with Italy, let alone that there had been a recent Ethiopian victory at Adwa. He was killed in the Ahmar Mountains near Daga Roba when he was attacked by an Oromo tribe. His body was never recovered, and the account of his demise was told years later by two of his companions, Vannutelli and Citerni, who survived but were kept in prison for two years by Menelik II, emperor of Ethiopia.

== Species named after Bottego ==
Bottego is commemorated in the scientific names of two species of lizards as well as one subspecies of turtle: Agama bottegi, Chalcides bottegi, and Pelusios sinuatus bottegi.

Bottego is commemorated in the scientific names of two species of fishes: Neobola bottegoi and Labeo bottegi.

== Selected writings ==
- Bottego, Vittorio (1892). "Nella terra dei Danakil: giornale di viaggio". Bollettino della Società geografica italiana. XXIX: 403–318, 480–494.
- Bottego, Vittorio (1895). Viaggi di scoperta nel cuore dell'Africa: il Giuba esplorato. Turin: E. Loescher.

== See also ==
- Dima-Bottego language

== Bibliography ==
- Ravenstein, E. G. (1894). "Italian Explorations in the Upper Basin of the Jub". The Geographical Journal. 3 (2): 134–138. doi:10.2307/1774030.
- Bianchedi, Luca (2010). Un destino africano. L'avventura di Vittorio Bottego. Rome: Pagine. ISBN 978-8-87-557393-5.
- Finaldi, Giuseppe (2016). A History of Italian Colonialism, 1860–1907: Europe’s Last Empire. Taylor & Francis. ISBN 978-1138697973.
- Taddei, L.; Bui, A., eds. (2022). L'esploratore perso nell'oblio. Vittorio Bottego tra mito, storia e rimosso coloniale. Pgreco.
