= Wawu language =

Obscure language from West Africa

Wawu
- Vavu
- Region: West Africa (Ghana?)
- Era: attested late 18th century
- Language family: unclassified

Language codes
- ISO 639-3: None (mis)
- Glottolog: wavu1234

Wawu (or perhaps Vavu; Russian transcription Вавуски) is an obscure language formerly spoken in West Africa that has not been classified. The only evidence for this language, assuming it is not spurious, is published in a late 18th-century source that includes two languages called "Wawu", the other being a dialect of Ewe. The consultant for the unclassified language called "Wawu" identified his people's neighbors as the Fra (Kasena), Bente, Naena, Gui, Guraa (Anyi), Guaflee and No (= Nejo, Bete).

== Data ==
A few words of Wawu are recorded. Numerals are as follows, with ⟨y⟩ substituted for German ⟨j⟩.

1 baba
2 bauli
3 yanna
4 tofla
5 guena
6 brong
7 yegra
8 khiboa
9 boafri
10 magro
11 tobno
12 donu

A sentence has also been recorded:

[Christ] esoaree, amboaree anyembo
'[Christ] loves me, has washed me with blood'
