= Gomba language =

Unclassified language of Ethiopia

Gomba
- Native to: Ethiopia
- Language family: unclassified

Language codes
- ISO 639-3: None (mis)
- Glottolog: None

Gomba is an extinct unclassified language of Ethiopia. The language is reported as having been spoken a few generations ago in the village of Labok in Southern Omo Zone, with their speakers having since then assimilated to the Nyangatom people. Possible affiliation in Afro-Asiatic has been floated.
