= Dima language (Ethiopia) =

Extinct unclassified language of Ethiopia

Dima
- Native to: Ethiopia
- Region: Lake Turkana
- Ethnicity: Dima
- Era: attested 1897
- Language family: unclassified

Language codes
- ISO 639-3: None (mis)
- Glottolog: dima1246

The Dima language (Doqo Dimā) is an extinct language formerly spoken in Ethiopia by the Dima people, who lived to the east of the Omo River north of Lake Turkana, as described by Vittorio Bottego in an expedition to Ethiopia in 1897. It is known by only a few numerals, which do not obviously resemble another language.

== Vocabulary ==
Only the Dima numerals 1–10 are recorded.

1. ekkā
2. ekkinā
3. dāsā
4. dꬰndāsā
5. osā
6. osꬰkꬰr
7. fāṣā
8. orongo
9. kēriri
10. kēpēs

6 osꬰkꬰr appears to be composed of 5 osā+1 ekkā.
