= Ambermo language =

Unclassified Papuan language

Ambermo
- Native to: Indonesia
- Region: Mamberamo, Papua Province
- Era: attested 1855
- Language family: unclassified

Language codes
- ISO 639-3: None (mis)
- Glottolog: ambe1246

Ambermo is an unclassified Papuan language of Papua province, Indonesia.

== Vocabulary ==
In 1855, G. J. Fabritius collected numerals from around Geelvink Bay. At the 'Ambermo' (Mamberamo) River at the eastern extent of his coverage, he collected tenama '1' and bisa '2' from an unnamed language. However, he notes that the people only 'count' by means of singular and plural, so it is doubtful whether tenama and bisa are actually numerals. In any case, these words do not resemble the numerals in any language of the area, so the language Fabritius encountered remains unidentified.
