= Antonio de Ciudad Real =

Antonio de Ciudad Real was a Franciscan friar, born 1551, in Castilla La Nueva, Spain. At the age of 15, he joined the Convent of San Francisco, in Toledo, Spain. In 1573, he accompanied Diego de Landa, on his second trip to Yucatán, in the Viceroyalty of New Spain. Between 1584 and 1589, he accompanied Alonso Ponce, the commissary general of the Franciscan Order, on his trip from Mexico to Nicaragua, visiting the Franciscan convents of New Spain. A record of this long trip is contained in his work Tratado curioso y docto de las grandezas de la Nueva España. He was also the author of the 1577 Motul Dictionary, which translates words of Yucatec Maya into Spanish. In 1603 he was elected provincial of the Franciscan order. He died on July 5, 1617, in Mérida, Yucatán, Nueva España.
