= Zapotec language (Jalisco) =

Extinct language of Jalisco, Mexico

Zapotec
- Native to: Mexico
- Region: Ciudad Guzmán, Jalisco
- Extinct: (date missing)
- Language family: unclassified

Language codes
- ISO 639-3: None (mis)
- Location of Ciudad Guzmán in Jalisco
- Coordinates: 19°42′N 103°28′W

Zapotec (Spanish: zapoteco) is an extinct, unclassified Mesoamerican language formerly spoken in Ciudad Guzmán, Jalisco, Mexico. It may have been a dialect of the nearby Otomi language.

== Name ==
The name "Zapotec" is derived from Zapotlán, the former name of Ciudad Guzmán, where the language was spoken. Zapotlán was renamed Ciudad Guzmán in 1857.

Despite sharing the same name, Zapotec has no known relationship to the Zapotec languages of Oaxaca.

== Evidence ==
The existence of Zapotec is known from a relación geográfica made in 1580 by Gerónimo Flores, alcalde mayor of the province of Tuspa, Tamatzula and Zapotlán (now Tuxpan, Tamazula de Gordiano and Ciudad Guzmán, respectively). According to Flores:

[In Zapotlán] they have four languages which they formerly used and use, which are called Mechoacan [Purépecha], Zayulteca, Zapoteca, and Naguas, which is Mexican [Nahuatl], which they all generally speak. (Note: Spanish: tienen quatro lenguas de que antiguamente vsaban y vsan, que se llaman: mechoacan y çayulteca y çapoteca y naguas, ques mexicana, en la qual hablan todos en jeneral.)

== Extinction ==
Zapotec became extinct due to the community shifting from using Zapotec to using Nahuatl as their primary language. Nahuatl had become a lingua franca in the pre-Columbian era, being used as the administrative language of the Aztec Empire and as a trade language beyond the empire's borders, and was subsequently also promoted by the Spaniards after the Spanish conquest. Nearby languages that went extinct in similar circumstances include Sayultec (which was also spoken in Ciudad Guzmán alongside Zapotec), Cochin, Otomi, Tiam, and Tamazultec.
