= Tuxcacuesco =

- Municipality and town
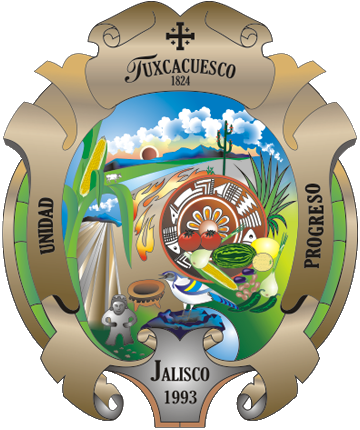
- Coat of arms

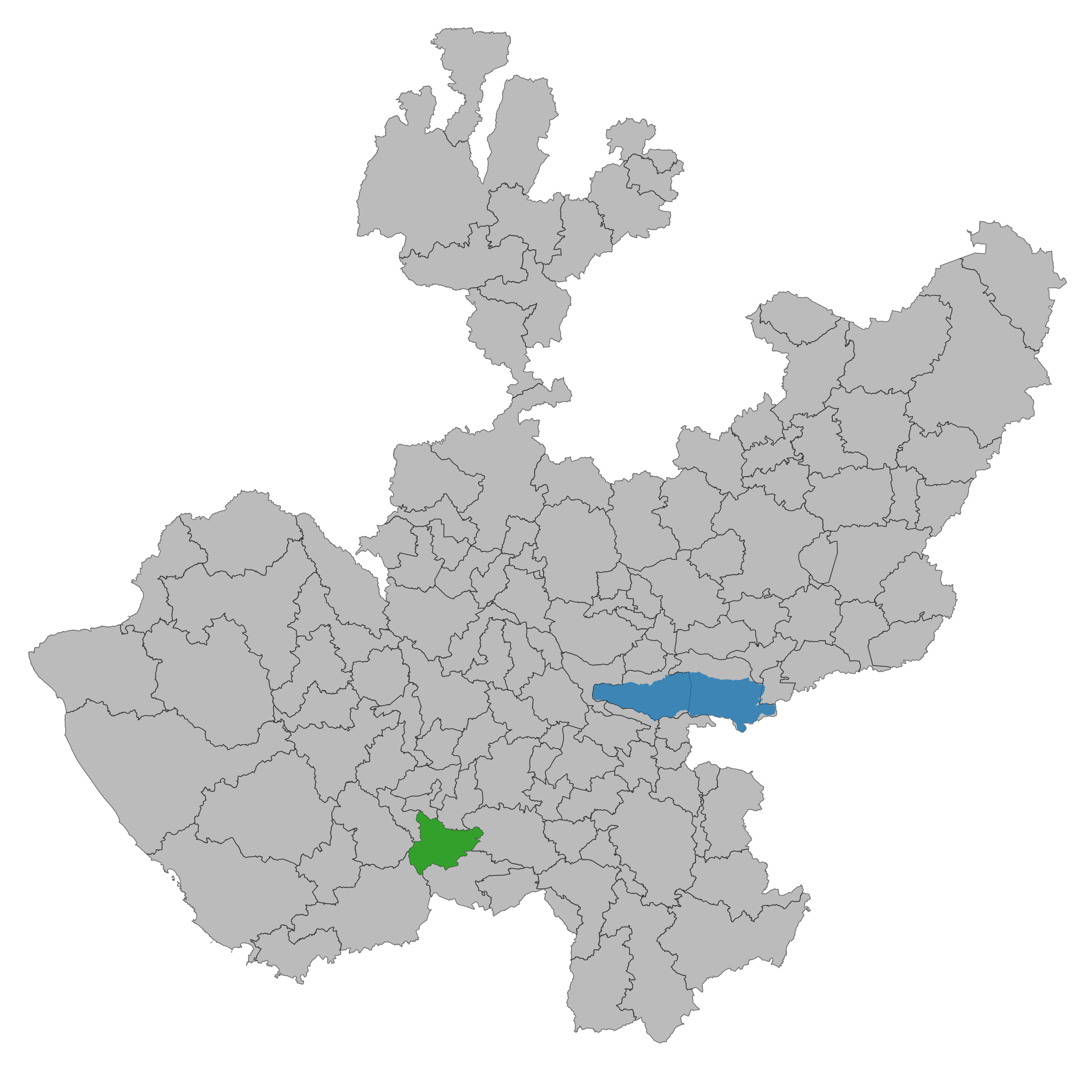
- Location of the municipality in Jalisco

- Location in Mexico
- Coordinates: 19°41′55″N 103°59′05″W
- Country: Mexico
- State: Jalisco

Area
  - Total: 430 km^{2} (170 sq mi)
  - Town: 0.88 km^{2} (0.34 sq mi)

Population (2020 census)
  - Total: 5,482
  - Density: 13/km^{2} (33/sq mi)
  - town: 1,674
  - town density: 1,900/km^{2} (4,900/sq mi)
- Time zone: UTC-6 (Central Standard Time)

Tuxcacuesco is a town and municipality, in Jalisco in central-western Mexico. The municipality covers an area of 430 km^{2}. As of 2005, the municipality had a total population of 3,770.

== Economy ==
Tuxcacuesco is home to "Tuxca Corona", a factory started by the Corona family which produces a 100% pure distilled agave liquor.

== History ==
Tuxcacuesco was a separate state prior to the Spanish incursion. It was conquered by the Spanish in 1523. During the colonial period it was part of the province of Amula.

Novelist Juan Rulfo was born in the town of Apulco in the northeast part of the municipality in 1917.
