= Amarna letter EA 245 =

14th-century BCE Egyptian clay tablet

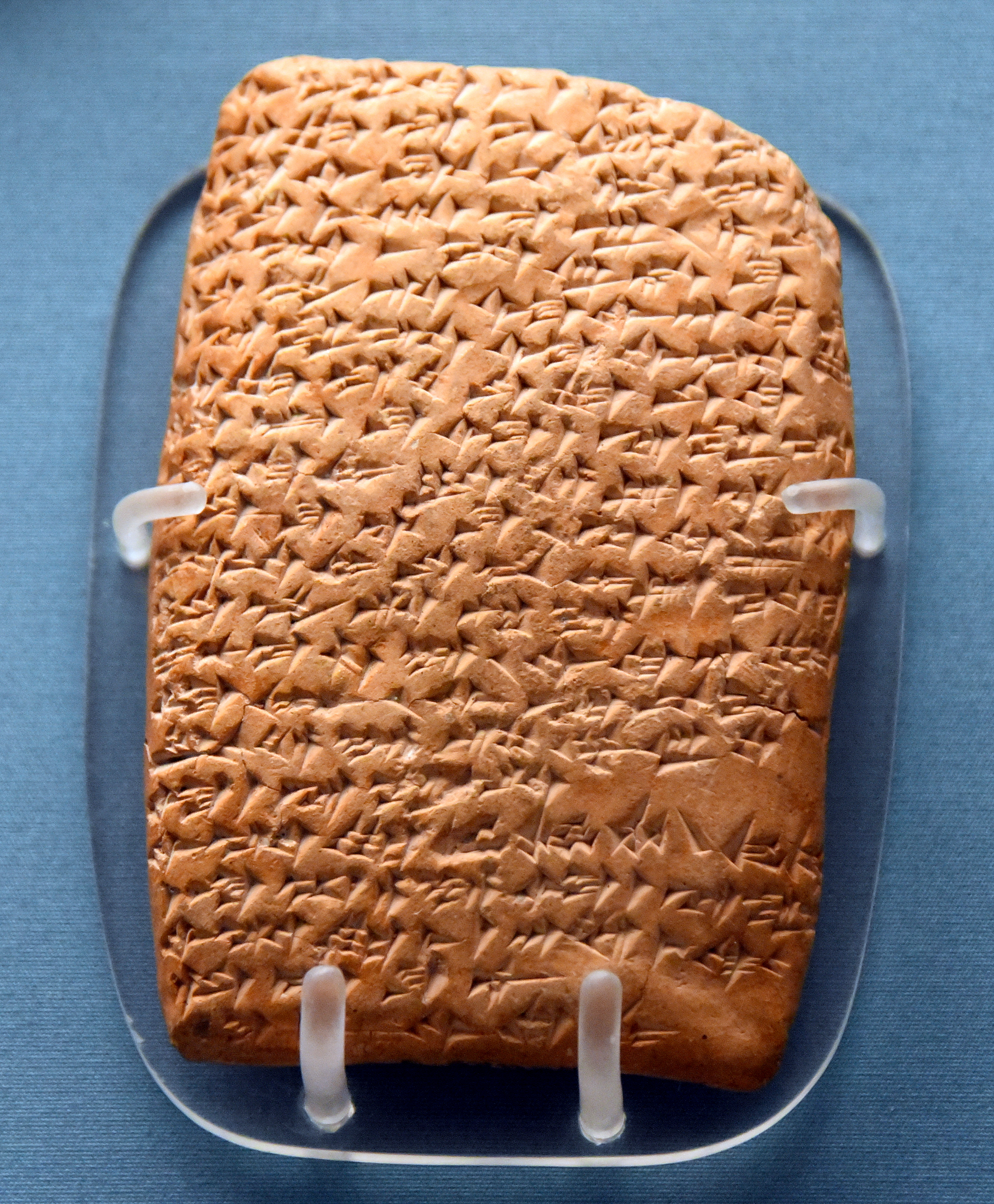
Amarna letter EA 245, (Reverse). Letter from Biridiya, King of Megiddo, to the Egyptian Pharaoh Amenhotep III or his son Akhenaten. 14th century BCE. From Tell el-Amarna, Egypt. British Museum. ME 29855.

Amarna letter EA 245, titled: "Assignment of Guilt," is a medium length clay tablet Amarna letter from Biridiya the governor-'mayor' of Magidda. It is letter number four of five from Biridiya.

The letter is in pristine condition except for a missing flake (lower-right, obverse) causing a lacuna at the end of a few lines. The cuneiform characters are finely inscribed, with some photos that can even show the individual strokes of the cuneiform characters (the stroke sequence). The letter is 47-lines long, and about 5-in tall. Letter EA 245 (see here-(Obverse): ), is numbered BM 29855, at the British Museum.

The Amarna letters, about 300, numbered up to EA 382, are a mid 14th century BC, about 1350 BC and 20–25 years later, correspondence. The initial corpus of letters were found at Akhenaten's city Akhetaten, in the floor of the Bureau of Correspondence of Pharaoh; others were later found, adding to the body of letters.

== The letter ==
=== EA 245: "Assignment of Guilt" ===
EA 245, letter four of five. (Not a linear, line-by-line translation, and English from French.)

(Obverse, see here )

(Lines 1-7)--Moreover,^{1} I urged my brothers, "If the god of the king, our lord, brings it about^{2} that we overcome Lab'ayu, then we must bring him alive :–(gloss) ha-ia-ma to the king, our lord."
(8-14)--My mare, however having been put out of action :–-(gloss) tu-ra (having been shot), I took my place behind him :–(gloss) ah-ru-un-ú and rode with Yashdata.^{3} But before my arrival they had struck him down :–(gloss) ma-ah-ṣú-ú.
(15-23)--Yašdata being truly your servant, he it was that entered with me into batt[le]. May [ ... ] [ ... ] the life^{4} of the king, my [lord], that he may br[ing peace to ever]yone^{5} in [the lands of] the king, [my] lord.

(Reverse, see here )

(24-35)--It had been Surata that took Labaya from Magidda. and said to me, "I will send him to the king by boat :–(gloss) a-na-yi "^{6} Surata took him, but he sent him from Hinnatunu to his home, for it was Surata that had accepted from him :–(gloss) ba-di-ú his ransom.
(36-47)--Moreover, what have I done to the king, my lord, that he has treated me with contempt :–(gloss) ia_{8}-qí-ìl-li-ni and honored :–(gloss) ia_{8}-ka-bi-id my less important brothers?^{7} It was Surata that let Lab'ayu go, and it was Surata that let Ba'l-mehir go, (both) to their homes. And may the king, my lord, know.--(complete Obverse & Reverse, EA 245, minor, restored lacunae, (and a small corner of clay tablet missing), total ines 1-47)

== Akkadian text ==
The Akkadian language text:

Akkadian:

Obverse (see here: )

(Line 1)--Ša-ni-tam dabābu--(..Furthermore,.. to expound upon (to talk))
(2)--UGU ŜEŠ-HI.A-ia--(upon Brothers-Mine,.. )
(3)--šumma epēšu--(..If .. to make happen)
(4)--^{D}MEŠ-nu ša LUGAL-ri(=ŠÀRru) ^{EN}Bēlu-nu--( "the God"-ours,.. 'which of' King-Lord-Ours.. )
(5)--ù kašādu--(..and Defeat–!.. )
(6)--1.^{diš}-La-aB-A-iYa ù til-la-nu-um-ma :-(gloss) ha-ia-ma--(1.^{diš}-Labaya,.. and "bodily" : (–gl–) "alive",.. )
(7)--nu-abālu ana LUGAL-ri(=ŠÀRru) ^{EN}Bēlu-nu--(..Bring 'unto'(to) King-Lord-Ours–!... )
segue:
(8)--Ù tu-sà-ah-mi(=tazzimtu) : (–gl–) tu-ra(tarû)--(..But "bad luck" :-(gloss) "returned"?('my horse was "shot"')..)
(9)--ANŠE.KUR.ra :-(gloss) MUNUS-ia ù uzuzzu--(Horse- :-(gloss) mine,..and "to be present",.. )
(10)--EGIR.ERIM-šu : (–gl–) harānnú--(..BEHIND.ARMY-his :-(gloss) "expeditioning"(=road, journey) )
(11)--ù erēbu--(..and "to encamp"(to set),.. )
(12)--itti 1.^{diš}-Ya((=pi))-aŠ-Da-Ta--(with Yashdata–!... )
segue:
(13)--Ù adi kašādu--(..But before "conquering"(reaching/vanquishing),.. )
(14)--ù dâku :-(gloss) mahāṣ(ú)u--(and "killed" : (–gl–) 'fighting'–!.. )
(15)--ù elû-mì(+šamû(heaven)?) 1.^{diš}-Ya(=pi)-aŠ-Da-Ta--(and "ascended-up" 1.^{diš}-Yashdata,.. )
(16)--Ardu-ka ù š-ût--(Servant-yours,.. and "who of",.. )
(17)--erēbu itti--(-(always)-"to enter" with,.. )
(18)--ina ^{MÈ}ERIM(=tāhāzu) tāhāzu--(..into ^{BATTLE}-War-Battle–!.. )
(19)--ù lū nâ[-du ana šâšu ]--(and "may it be" 'to (have)-praise' for him,.. )
(20)--til-la-aṭ(tillu) LUGAL-ri(=ŠÀRru) ^{EN}Bēlu-ia--(.."warriors"(workers)-(of),. King-Lord-Mine,.. )
(21)--[ ù ] epē[-šu ]--(..and "to treat"... [ .. ])-(lacuna)
(22)--gabbu ina [ ... ]--(..everyone in [ ..?.. ] )-(lacuna)
(23)--LUGAL-ri(=ŠÀRru) ^{EN}Bēlu-ia--(.., King-Lord-Mine–! .. )
segue:

Reverse (see here: )

(24)--Ù 1.^{diš}-Sú-Ra-Ta--(But,.. 1.-Surata.. )
(25)--yi(=pi)-il_{5}-qû(leqû) 1.^{diš}-La-aB-A-iYa--(..took Labaya.. )
(26)--ištu ^{URU}Ma-GID_{6}-Da^{ki}--(from Magidda,.. )
(27)--ú yi(=pi)-qabû ana iā-[ ši ](iāši)(--(and "said" to me:— )
(28)--enūma ša ^{GIŠ}MÁ : (–gl–) a-na-yi--(.."Now 'that by' BOAT :-(gloss) 'ship'... )
(29)--uššuru-šu--(..Send (issue)!..(i.e. Labaya)..)
(30)--ana LUGAL-ri(=ŠÀRru),.. ù (pi)leqû--(to (the) King,.." ..But 'taken'..)
(31)--1.^{diš}-Sú-Ra-Ta ù (pi)tarû--(..(by) 1.-Surata,.. and "returned"-him..)

== Cuneiform score, Akkadian, English ==
Cuneiform score (per CDLI, Chicago Digital Library Initiative), and Akkadian, and English.

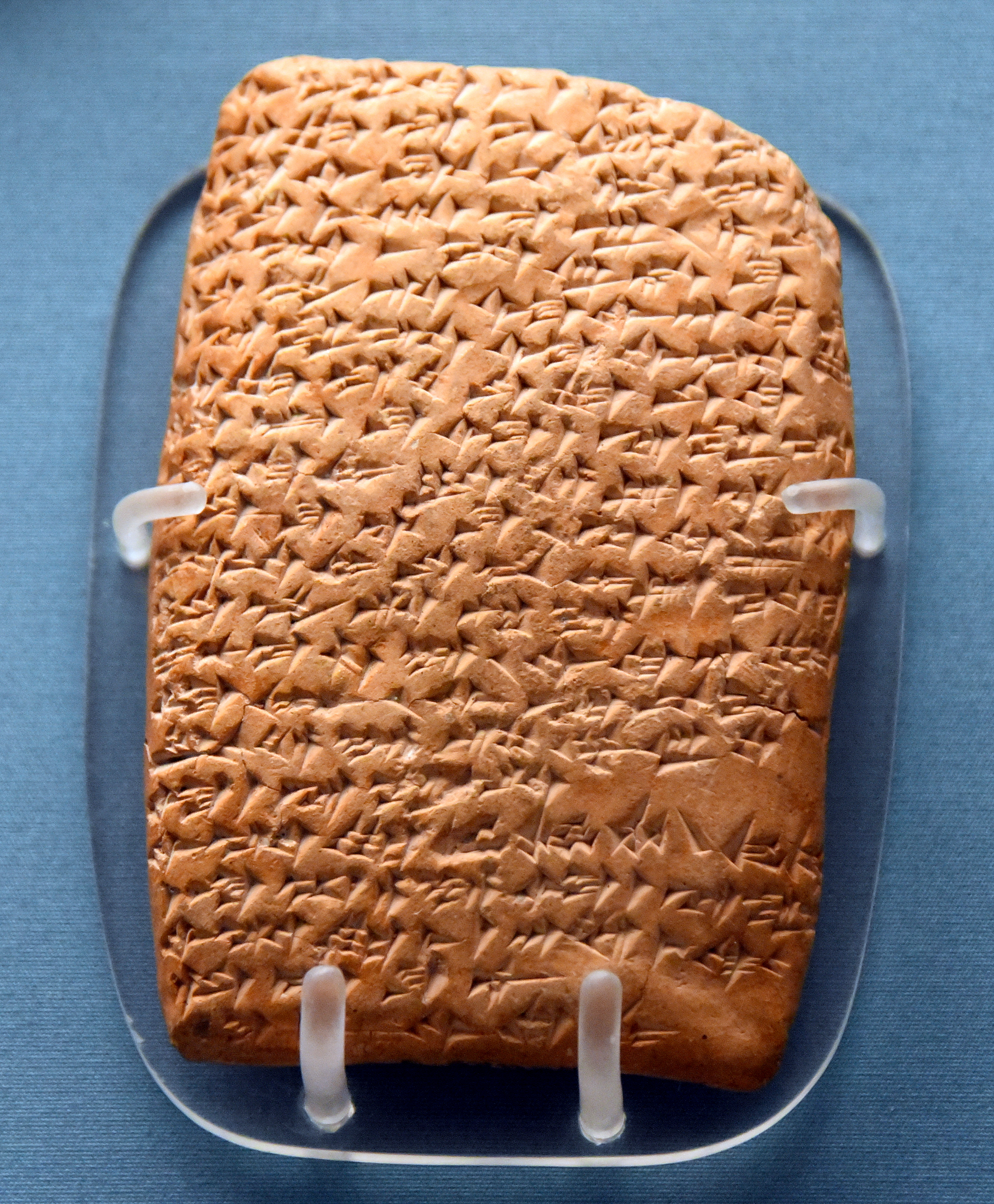
EA 245, (Reverse) Obverse, (lines 1-23) (See here; )

=== Obverse ===
==== Paragraph I (lines 1-7) ====
1.(P. I of IV) Ša-ni-tam du-ub-bu-ba-ku-mì
___Šanitam, — dabābu
___Furthermore, — I urged
2. _UGU-ŠEŠ^{hi-a}_-ia
___ _UGU-ŠEŠ^{hi-a}_-ia–!
___(with) Compatriots^{pl.}-mine (my Brothers)–!

==== Sub-paragraph ====
3.Šum-ma-mi yi-pu-šu-mi
___Šumma epēšu
___^{Quote}If (they)bring
4. _^{dingir}-meš_-nu ša (Šàrru)_Šàr_-ri _EN_-nu
___ilu^{pl.}-nu, — ša (Šàrru)_Šàr_-ri _EN_-nu, —
___gods^{pl.}-our, — which(are-of) King-Lord-ours, —
5.ù ni-ik-šu-du-um-mi
___u kašādu–!
___and defeat–!
6.^{1=diš}La-ab-a-ia ù _til-la_nu-um-ma
Note: on Reverse, line 42.:– ma : (–gl–) ha-ia-ma
___^{1=diš}Labaya, — _tillu_-nu-um-ma
___^{1=diš}Labaya, — (equipment)-nu-um-ma : (–gl–) ha-ia-ma (by boat)(land carriage?)
7.nu-ub-ba-lu-uš-šu a-na (Šàrru)_Šàr_-ri _EN_-nu
___abālu ana (Šàrru)Šàr-ri EN-nu –!
___bring (him alive) to King Lord-ours –!
^{EndQuote}

==== Paragraph II (lines 8-23) ====
8.(P. II of IV) Ù tu-sà-ah-mì : (–gl–) tu-ra
___U tu-sà-ah-mì(tazzimtu) : (–gl–) tu-ra
___But "bad luck"(lamentation) : (–gl–)(the horse was disabled, "shot")
9.x?-pa? _ANŠE-KUR-RA:MUNUS_-ia ù iz-zi-iz-mì
___x?-pa? _ANŠE-KUR-RA:MUNUS_-ia,– u uzzuzu
___/+-x?-pa?-+/ horse-mine,– and (rode-behind)("stood-behind")
10. _EGIR_-šu : (–gl–) uh-ru-un-ú
___ _EGIR_-šu : (–gl–) harrānu —!
___behind (troops)-His : (–gl–) expedition-ing —!
11.Ù ir(wrong, =sa) sa-ka-ap-mi
___u sakāpu-mi
___and en-camped-Myself
12.it-ta ^{1=diš}-Ya-aš-da-ta
___itti ^{1=diš}-Ya-aš-da-ta
___with ^{1}Yashdata.

==== Segue ====
13.Ù a-di ka-ša-di-ia
___U adi kašādu
___But before "conquering"-(in-battle) (("arriving"-(into battle)-))
14.ù da-ku-šu : (–gl–) ma-ah-ṣú-ú
___u dâku-šu, – : (–gl–) mahāṣu, —!
___and "death-us", – : (–gl–) "struck-down", —!
15.ù al lu-ú-mì ^{1=(diš)} Ya-aš-da-ta
___u elû lū ^{1=(diš)}Ya-aš-da-ta
___and ascended, "let-it-be", ^{1}Yashdata, –
16. _ÁRAD_-ka ù šu-ú-te(~~ut!~~-no)
___ _ÁRAD_-ka, – u šu-ú-te
___Servant-yours, – but ?straight-away?
17.yi-ru-ub-mi it-ti^{#} [ x ]^{##}
___erēbu-mi, – itti-[ x ]^{##}
___entered-Myself, – with [ them ? ]^{##}
18.i-na MÈ (me3=tāhāzu) ta-ha^{#}-zi^{##}
___ina (MÈ = tāhāzu) - tāhā^{#}zu^{##}
___into BATTLE, battle
19.ù lu-ú yi-na- -[ -di-nu a-na ša-šu ]
___u lū nâ[du ana šâšu ]
___and "may-it-be" pr[aise for Him ]
20. _til-la-aṭ _ŠÀRRU_-ri^{#} [ _EN_ ]-ia
21.[ ù ] li-pa-aš^{#}-[ ši-ih ]

==== Bottom ====
22.gáb-bá i-na [ .... ]
23. _Šàr_-ri _EN_-ia
24.ù ^{1=diš}Sú-ra-ta^{#}

==== Paragraph III (lines 24-35) ====
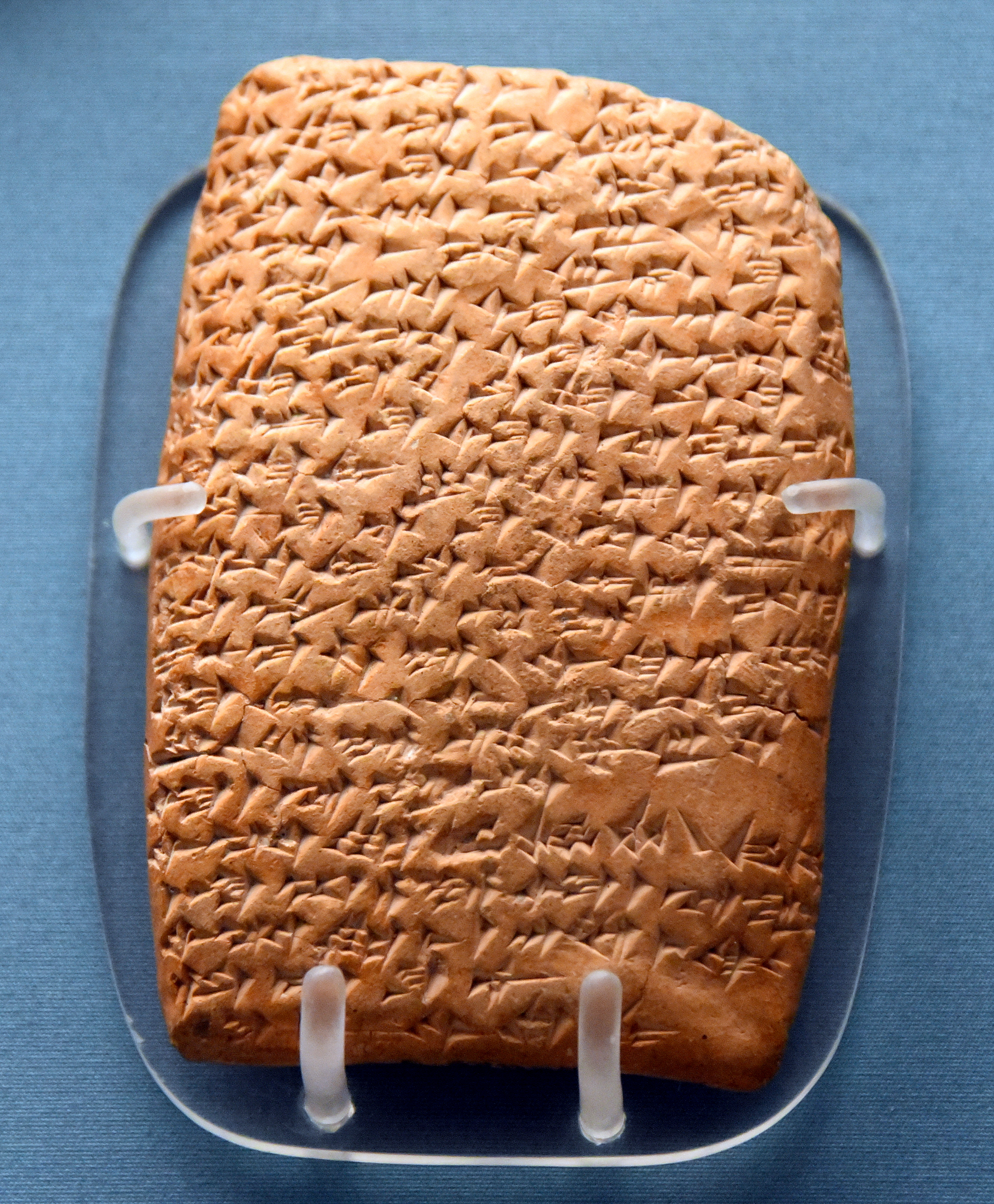
EA 245, Reverse Paragraph III, (lines 25-35) Paragraph IV, (36-47) Obverse, (See here; )

24.(ù ^{1=diš}Sú-ra-ta^{#} )
___u ^{1=diš}Sú-ra-ta^{#}
___and ^{1}Surata

=== Reverse ===
==== Paragraph III (lines 24-35) ====
25.(P. III of IV) yi-il_{5}-qé-mì 1-diš-La-[ ab-a-ia ]
___laqû 1-diš-La-[ ab-a-ia ]
___took...^{1}Labaya
26.iš-tu _IRI_ Ma-gid_{6}-da^{ki}
___ištu _URU_ Me-gid_{6}-da^{ki}
___from _city_ Megiddo
27.ù yi-iq-bi a-na ia-a- [ ši ]
___u qabû ana iāši —
___and said to me —
28.^{Quote}Ina-mí ((No))~~šà~~-~~geš~~-_MÁ_ giš-ru((yes)) : (–gl–) a-na-yi
___^{Quote}i-na-mí _MÁ_ giš-ru : (–gl–) a-na-yi
___^{Quote}By boat ....(?by land carriage)
29.ú-ta-aš-ša-ru-uš-šu
___uššuru
___(I will) send
30.a-na (_lugal_)_Šarru_-ri ù yi-ìl-qé-šu
___ana (_lugal_)_Šarru_-ri,— ù
___to King,—
30.5--------------ù yi-ìl-qé-šu
___-----------------u leqû
___-----------------and take
31.^{1=diš}Sú-ra-ta ù yu-ta-šar-šu
___^{1=diš}Sú-ra-ta
___^{1}Surata
31.5-------------ù yu-ta-šar-šu
___----------------u uššuru
___----------------and send (Him)
32.iš-tu _IRI_ He-na-tu-na^{ki}
___ištu _URU_ He-na-tu-na^{ki}
___from _city_ Hannathon
33.a-na _É_-šu ù ^{1=diš}Sú-ra-ta
___ana _É_-šu,^{EndQuote} — ù ^{1=diš}Sú-ra-ta
___To _house_his^{EndQuote} — and ^{1}Surata

==== Segue ====
33.5-------------ù ^{1=diš}Sú-ra-ta
___---------------u ^{1=diš}Sú-ra-ta
___---------------and ^{1}Surata
34.la-qí-mi _kù-BABBAR^{hi-a}_ ip-țì-ir-ri-šu
___leqû _kù-BABBAR^{hi-a}_
___took silver, – returning
34.6-------------ip-țì-ir-ri-šu
___----------------târu
___----------------returning
35.i-na _ŠU_-ti-šu : (–gl–) ba-di-ú
___ina _ŠU_-ti-šu : (–gl–) ba-di-ù
___in "Hand"-his — : (–gl–) ba-di-ù–! (the ransom—!) (the Silver—!)

==== Paragraph IV (lines 36-47) ====
36. (P. IV) Ša-ni-tam, – mi-na-am-mi ep-ša-ku-mì
___Šanitam, — mīnu epēšu
___Furthermore, — what (have I) done
36.3----------mi-na-am-mi ep-ša-ku-mì
___------------- — Mi-na-am-mi ep-ša-ku-mì
___------------- — ^{Quote}What (have I) done
37.a-na (Šàrru)_Šàr-ri_ _EN_-ia
___ana (Šàrru)_Šàr-ri_ _EN_-ia—?
___to (Šàrru) _King(-ri)_ _Lord_-mine—?
38.i-na-mí _sig_-ia : (–gl–) ya-qí-ìl-li-ni
___inuma-(enūma), — _sig_-ia : (–gl–) ya-qí-ìl-li-ni —!
___Now, — (I am) contempted —!
39. — Ù _DUGUD_ : (–gl–) yu-ka-bi-id
___ — U : (–gl–) yu-ka-bi-id (kabta)
___ — But are honored
40. _ŠEŠ_^{HI-A}-ia șé-eh-ru-ta_{5}
___ _ŠEŠ_^{HI-A}-ia,— șehēru, —!
___(compatriots)(Brothers)^{pl.}-mine,— less important, —!^{EndQuote}

==== Segue ====
41.Ù ^{1=diš}Sú-ra-ta
___U ^{1=diš}Sú-ra-ta
___But ^{1}Surata
42.yu-ta-šir9
Note: the rest, (majority), of line 42, is the up-side-down cuneiform from Obverse, Line 6
nu-um-ma : (–gl–) ha-ia-ma

42.yu-ta-šir9
___aṣû
___brought
43.^{1=diš}La-ab-a-ia ù
___^{1=diš}La-ab-a-ia ù
___^{1}Labaya
43.7--------------ù
___----------------u
___----------------and
44.yu-ta-šir_{9}-mì ^{1=diš, d}iškur-me-her
___aṣû ^{1=diš, d}iškur-me-her
___brought ^{1}Ba'al-Mehir
45.a-na _É_-šu-ni
___ana _bītu_-šu, –!
___to _house_-his, –!

==== Sub paragraph ====
46.Ù lu-ú yi-de-mi
___U, — lū idû, –
___And, — "may-it-be" proclaimed (& recognized), –
("may you know ")
47.(Šàrru)Šàr-ru EN-ia–!
___(Šàrru)Šàr-ru EN-ia–!
___King Lord-mine–!

== See also ==
- Biridiya
- Labaya
- Tel Megiddo
- Glossenkeil (Amarna letters)
- Amarna letters–phrases and quotations
