= Amarna letter EA 147 =

14th-century BCE Egyptian clay tablet

Amarna letter EA 147, titled A Hymn to the Pharaoh, is a moderate length clay tablet Amarna letter (mid 14th century BC) from Abimilku of Tyre-(called Ṣurru in the Abimilku letters, and an island, until the time of Alexander the Great, 330 BC). The letter is a twin letter to EA 149, which is identical in length, and complexity, and EA 147 appears to precede EA 149.

== General overview ==
The letter concerns the intrigues of neighboring city-states and their rulers; however the letter is a missive on the religious setting of Tyre, and the personal explanation of the view of the Pharaoh of Egypt, in a religious, and righteous 'way of life' of the people of Tyre towards Egypt, and the Pharaoh, as the Sun God.

The clay tablet letter is written on the Obverse, Bottom, Reverse, Top (which is bottom of Reverse), and Left Side, leaving no spaces, not inscribed. The British Museum website for the EA 147 letter (with photo of Reverse), gives the approximated dimensions as: 3 1/4 × 2 1/4 in (3.25 inches (83 mm) / 2.25 inches (57 mm), or 8.3 cm × 5.7 cm).

EA 147 is located at the British Museum, no 29812.

The Amarna letters, about 300, numbered up to EA 382, are mid-14th century BC, about 1360 BC and 35? years later, correspondence. The initial corpus of letters were found at Akhenaten's city Akhetaten, in the floor of the Bureau of Correspondence of Pharaoh; others were later found, adding to the body of letters.

== Categorization and characteristics ==
Amarna letter EA 147 is a missive (a letter sent), but more accurately, a treatise or essay, on the Role of the Pharaoh as Sun-God, and "Protector", etc.

Letter 147 is in the category of Amarna letters, which has the following specifics:

1. EA 147 is undamaged (with few minor surface scrapes).
2. It is of moderate length, a single clay tablet (not part of a series, ex 2-tablet letter, or a listing like EA 13, 14 or 22).
3. It has clarity of cuneiform characters, probably for two reasons: A–The execution of the scribe; and B–The preparation of a clay mixture (probably with added ingredients), which caused a hardened clay tablet. (The scribe's story, demanded a higher performing clay tablet.(?))
4. The Letter 147 story contains: Obverse:—Introduction & Clause 1;
  Bottom—An ending to the Obverse, and transition to Reverse;
  Reverse-(Clause 2 & 3), which begins (line 30), with the Akkadian word for "Help!" (and standing alone, with the next 2-words of line 30 beginning the start of Clause 2), and with the Reverse ending with two glossenkeils (line 56, only 2 words), translated as ':gl "I am at rest"; and :gl "I am confident" (end of line). (Note: there are multiple paragraphs and sub-paragraphs in EA 147, a 4-section letter, & see the Akkadian cuneiform section.)
5. The story of EA 147, is that it is a missive (or treatise or essay), on A Hymn to the Pharaoh (in 3 "duplicating clauses"). Clause 4 is the information to the Pharaoh, and the EA 147 ending. (Note: one would have to predict whether the layout of the letter was totally planned. The actual information in the letter (to the Pharaoh, or his post office—Bureau of Correspondence), only begins after the Reverse Side (beginning of the closing-(tablet ending) Clause 4 section), continuing from lines 57-60, and then continuing to the Left Side, for 8 lines, lines 64-71, (longer lines, due to the tallness of the tablet). The very last line (71), the Scribe writes: Enūma idû, "Now (at this time), know!" ("Now, be informed!").
6. The reverse (Clauses 2 – 3), is separated by an Exclamation, (an Interjection), line 40: [line 39: "Upon front-mine, upon (glossenkeil):back-mine!], "I carry (bring), the Causes (intentions) (Akkadian: amatu (word, matter)), King-Lord^{Li}-mine!" (Almost certainly, the scribe—(or Abimilku):–A, intended to get to the reverse side in the manner that he did; B, had to get through "Clause 3" to the ending of the Reverse, with its 2 closing glossenkeils). How he continued to the end of the letter would have to be speculation. And,.. remembering whether Abimilku played a part in the formation of this great story, letter 147.
  (Another minor Exclamation occurs on line 24.6: "Look at this!" [the start of Paragraph 2-c])
7. Because Letter 147 contains 3-duplicating clauses, Akkadian language words, and some phrases, are repeated. For example 3 times for the phrase day-by-day ("day and day", in the letter). It is used twice in Clause 1, Obverse (paragraph I-b) & the Bottom transition to the Reverse (the ending of Clause 1). The third usage is in the letter's ending, (Clause 4).
  Other repeated words are for example: "returns" (Akkadian sahāru, (3 times)), "breath" (hašû, (5)), "emerges/returns" (aṣû, (5)), and "now" (enūma, (numerous)).
8. Letter 147 uses 7 glossenkeils (a high number usage).

== Summary of glossenkeils used ==
Amarna letter EA 147	EA 147 Glossenkeil	EA 147 Akkadian language	translation
Amarna letter EA 147	Glossenkeil #1 line 12 Obverse	ha-ap-si	arm "power of his arm"
Amarna letter EA 147	Glossenkeil #2 line 28, Bottom	a-ru-u	"he is satisfied"
Amarna letter EA 147	Glossenkeil #3 line 36, Reverse	ku-na (exclamation) ku	"Prepare!"
Amarna letter EA 147	Glossenkeil #4 line 38, Reverse	ia-a-ia-ia (exclamation)	"yes, yes, yes!" (Yay!!)
Amarna letter EA 147	Glossenkeil #5 line 39, Reverse	su-ri-ia	"my back"
Amarna letter EA 147	Glossenkeils #6,7 line 56, Reverse	nu-uh-ti	"I am at rest"
Amarna letter EA 147	Glossenkeils #6,7 line 56, Reverse	ba-ti-i-ti	"I am confindent"

== Text (minus obverse and reverse (hymn omitted)) ==
Reverse
bottom to side:

(57-60) I indeed said to the Sun, the father of the king, my lord, "When shall I see the face of the king my lord?"

Side (left)

(61-71) I am indeed guarding Tyre, the principal city,^{11} for the king, my lord, until the powerful arm of the king comes forth over me, to give me water to drink and wood to warm myself. Moreover, Zimredda, the king of Sidon, writes daily to the rebel Aziru, the son of 'Abdi-Ašratu, about every word he has heard from Egypt. I herewith write to my lord, and it is good that he knows.^{12} (end of letter (few, or no lacunae))

== Text: A Hymn to the Pharaoh ==
EA 147, letter two of ten from Abimilku. (Not a linear, line-by-line translation.)

Obverse

(Lines 1-8) the king, my lord, my god, my Sun: Message of Abi-Milku, your servant. I fall at the feet of the king, my lord, 7 times and 7 times. I am the dirt under the sandals (and "shoes") of the king, my lord. My lord is the Sun who comes forth over all lands day by day,^{1} according to the way (of being) of the Sun, his gracious father.
(9-15) who gives life by his sweet breath and returns with his north wind;^{2} who establishes the entire land in peace, by the power of his arm :(gl–𒃵) ha-ap-ši; who gives forth his cry in the sky like Baal,^{3} and all the land is frightened^{4} at his cry.
(16-21) The servant herewith writes to his lord that he heard the gracious messenger of the king who came to his servant, and the sweet breath that came forth from the mouth of the king, my lord, to his servant—his breath came back!
(22-28) Before the arrival of the messenger of the king, my lord, breath had not come back; my nose was blocked.^{5}

(Obverse)-Bottom

(25-29) Now that the breath of the king has come forth to me, I am very happy and :(gl–𒃵) :ha-ru-u (he is satisfied), day by day.^{6}
(29-38) Because I am happy, does the earth not pr[osp]er?^{7} (i.e. (minus 3 cuneiform characters for "Help!"), "Don't worry, just be happy")

Reverse^{7-(minus 3 cuneiform characters)}

(30-30.4) Help—! (i.e: "Help—!, us now, please")

(30.4-38) When I heard the gracious me[sse]nger from my lord, all the land was in fear of my lord, when I heard the sweet breath and the gracious messenger who came to me. When the king, my lord, said :(gl–𒃵) ku-na "(Prepare)^{8} before the arrival of a large army," then the servant said to his lord :(gl–𒃵) ia-a-i—ia ("Yes, yes, yes"__(( Yaaay ! )) )^{9}
(39-51) On my front and on sú-ri-ia (my back) I carry the word of the king, my lord. Whoever gives heed to the king, his lord, and serves him in his place, the Sun com(e)s forth over him, and the sweet breath comes back from the mouth of his lord. If he does not heed the word of the king, his lord, his city is destroyed, his house is destroyed, never (again) does his name exist in all the land. (But) look at the servant who gives heed to ((to)) his lord. His city prospers, his house prospers, his name exists forever.
(52-60) You are the Sun who comes forth over me, and a brazen wall set up for him,^{10} and because of the powerful arm :nu-uh—ti (I am at rest) : ha-ti-i-ti (I am confident).

== Cuneiform score, Akkadian, English ==
Cuneiform score (per CDLI, Chicago Digital Library Initiative), and Akkadian, and English.

Obverse
Introduction and start of Obverse

1. A-na _lugal_^{lí}-ia _dingir-meš_-ia _^{dingir}utu_-ia
___Ana Šarru^{lí}-ia, dingir-meš-ia, ^{dingir}utu-ia
___To King-mine, (of) gods^{pl.}-mine, ^{d}Sun-god-mine
2. um-ma A-Bi-_lugal ARAD2_-ka
___umma A-Bi-_lugal ARAD2_-ka
___message (of) Abimilki-(servant)-yours
3. (7) u (7) a-na _giri3^{meš} Šarru EN_^{lí}-ia
___(7) u (7) ana GIRI3^{meš}, Šarru EN^{lí}-ia, — maqātu – !
___7-and-7 (times) at feet^{pl.}, —King Lord-mine, — I bow – !
4. A-na-ku ip-ru iš-tu šu-pa-li
___Anāku (Abimilki), eperu ištu šupalû
___I (Abimilki), the dirt(dust) from "the feet"-((two))
5. ši-ní EN-lí-ia be-li
___šina, —EN-ia, bēlu, –
___(two), —Lord-mine, Lord, –
6. _^{dingir}utu_ ša it-ta-ṣí i-na _UGU_-hi
___^{d}-utu ša aṣû ina UGU-hi
___(the) ^{(god)}Sun-God, Who Emerges ("returns") "Upon"
7. _KUR_ ma-ta-ti i-na _u_{4}_-mi ù _u_{4}_-mi-ma
___mātu immatima? ina _u_{4}_-mi ù _u_{4}_-mi-ma
___(the) Land (+Matching?), for Day-by-Day-(daily,-!)(day-and-day)
8. ki-ma ši-ma-at _^{d}utu_ a-bu-šu _SAGA_
___kīma Šīmtu ^{d}utu abu-šu SAGA
___"As-Like",-- "Way of Being"(Fate, Destiny),-- (the) ^{d}Sun-God,- Father-His, "Gracious" !
9. ša i-ba-li-it i-na še-hi-šu _du_{10}-ga_
___ša abālu ina še-hi-šu du_{10}-ga –!
___who brings(arrives), by Breath-His-Sweet –!
10.ù i-sà-hír i-na ṣa-pa-ni-šu
___u sahāru ina ṣa-pa-ni-šu – !
___and "Returns" by "North-wind"-His – !

segue
11. ša it-ta ṣa-ab
___ša itti ṣābu –
___who with troops –
11.5------------------gáb-bi _kur_-ti
___---------------------gabbu māti
___---------------------all land
12. i-na pa-ša-hi i-na du-ni-zà : (gl)–𒃵) :ha-ap-ši
___ina pašāhu ina dannu(=danānu) : (gl)–𒃵) :ha-ap-ši
___into "Submission"("relenting"),.. By "Strength"(power) : (gl)–𒃵) :(of his) "arm" !!
13. ša id-din ri-ig-ma-šu i-na ša10-me
___ša idû, rigmu-šu ina ša10-me
___who "makes known", Voice-his, in "the Sky"
14. ki-ma ^{d}iškur ù tar-gu_{5}-ub gáb-bi
___kīma ^{d}iškur u tar-gu_{5}-ub(eṭēru) gabbu – !
___Like ^{god}Baal – and (eṭēru) "Finds and saves" All – !

Bottom: (lines 26-30.3)

26.še-hu _Ŝarru_ a-na _ugu_-hi^{#}-ia^{#}
___še-hu Ŝarru ana _ugu_-hi^{#}-ia^{#}
___"breath" (of) King "upon us"
27.ù ha-ad-ia-ti ma-gal
___u, – hadû — ma-gal—!
___and-("then"), – "to be Happy"(to be glad=hadû) — great—!
28.ù : (gl)–𒃵) :a-ru-ú i-na _u_{4}_-mi u _u_{4}_-[ mi ]-ma
___u, — : (gl)–𒃵) a-ru-ú, — ina _u_{4}_-mi u _u_{4}_-[ mi ]-ma
___And, — : (gl)–𒃵) "He-is-satisfied, — for "Day-by-Day" —! (day-and-day)
29.aš-šum ha-dì-ia-ti la-a ti-[ ši ]-ir^{#}
___aššum hadû, — lā
___"because of" "to-be-happy", — NOT sad

segue
Reverse
30.3 er-ṣé-tum
___rēṣūtu
___Help — ! (rēṣūtu)

== See also ==
- Amarna letter EA 149
- Glossenkeil (Amarna letters)
- List of Amarna letters by size
