= Amarna letter EA 75 =

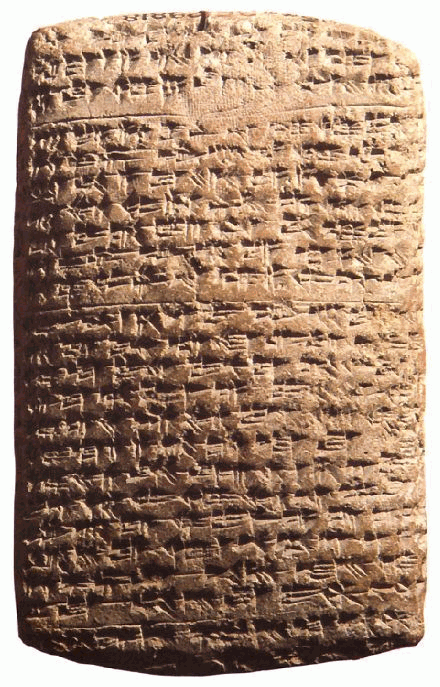
EA 161, Obverse (slightly out-of-focus)

Amarna letter EA 75, titled: "Political Chaos", is a short to moderate length letter from Rib-Hadda, who wrote the largest number of Amarna letters in a sub-corpus, from the city-state of Byblos; Byblos contained an Ancient Egyptian colony, and was aligned with a few neighboring townsites.

EA 75 is damaged with a few lines missing on the Bottom, Obverse, and parts of line endings, and beginnings, but the topic of the letter is extensive — explaining the conflict with 'Apiru/Habiru and also major Great King states of the region (Hatti(Hattusa) and Mitanni).

After a short Introduction to the Pharaoh, the dire straits of the city-state are related. Possessions are sold in Yarimuta to stay alive, and the Habiru warfare has reduced the town's people to conduct daily life: "...My field is "a wife without a husband", lacking in cultivation."

The Amarna letters, about 300, numbered up to EA 382, are a mid 14th century BC, about 1360 BC and 30–35 years later, correspondence. The initial corpus of letters were found at Akhenaten's city Akhetaten, in the floor of the Bureau of Correspondence of Pharaoh; others were later found, adding to the body of letters.

Note: there are two missing lines at the letter's Bottom, Obverse. Also at the letter's end, but final sentences are made at the tablet's left edge, partially damaged. (see here: )

Letter EA 75 (also see here-(Obverse & Reverse, etc.): ), is numbered C 4757 (12191), from the Cairo Museum.

== Cuneiform and Akkadian ==
The cuneiform of EA 75, and the Akkadian text.

Obverse (see here: )

Paragraph Ia

(Line 1)—[ ^{Diš} ]-Ri-iB-aD-Da [ iq-bi ]–.–.–.–(.. ^{(m)(Male)}Rib-Hadda .. Speaking ! )
(2)—[ a ]-na EN-šu lugal -/- ["kur-kur lugal gal" ]–.–( to Lord-his .. King (of) Lands ! )
(3)—^{d}nin ša ^{iri} [ GUB-La ]–.–.–.–.–.–( --///-- Mistress "which of" ^{City-state}Byblos (Gubla) --//-- )
(4)—ti-din kal-ga a-[-na lugal EN-ia ]–.–( ... "Proclaim"(Know) Strength(Power) For(To) Lord-mine !,... )
(5)—a-na GÌRI-MEŠ -//- EN-ia ^{d}utu-ia–.–(.. at Feet(S) -//- Lord-mine ^{God}Sun-mine,.. )
(6)—7(diš)-šu 7diš-a-an am-qú-ut {{ [?? lu-ú ??] }}—.—( 7 (times and) 7 times,.. -/- "I bow" ! ("I address you"?) )

Paragraph Ib

(7)—[ i-]-de lugal EN-li -//- i-nu-[ ma .. ]—/—( .. Know,.. King Lord-(li) --//-- Now(Now, at this time)... )
(8)—šal-ma-at ^{iri}GUB-LA géme-ka–.–.–.–(.. "is Peaceful" ^{City}Gubla .. "Handmaid"-yours )
(9)—ìš-tu da-ri-it u4-kàm-meš–.–.–.–( .. From Forever - "Time" ! )

Paragraph Ic

(10)—ša-ni-tam ga-kal nu-kúr ša ^{erìn}-GAZ-MEŠ–.–.–( However, (the) "warfare" "which of" ^{ARMY}'Apiru (Habiru) ... )

== Akkadian ==
Obverse (see here: )

Paragraph Ia

(Line 1)—[ ^{Diš} ]-Rib-Hadda [ qabû ]
(2)—[ a ]-na Bēlu-šu lugal [kur-kur(mâtâti) lugal gal ]
(3)—^{d}nin ša ^{iri} [ GUB-LA ]
(4)—idû kal-ga(=dannu) a[na lugal EN-ia ]
(5)—ana GÌRI-MEŠ(šêpê) -//- Beli-ia ^{d}utu-ia
(6)—7(diš)-šu 7diš-a-an maqātu [?? lu-ú ??]

Paragraph Ib

(7)—[ i ]-dû lugal EN-li -//- inü[ ma .. ]
(8)—šalāmu ^{iri}GUBLa géme-ka
(9)—ìštu dār u4-kàm-meš

Paragraph Ic

(10)—šanitam ga-kal nukurtu ša erìn-GAZ-MEŠ

== The Habiru/'Apiru ==

The mention of the Habiru shows the conflict of the time, as the takeover of city-states or regions by the Habiru. The map shows various cities and regions, and their respective dealings with the Habiru. (There are only 3 letters from Labaya of Šakmu/Shechem.) The next closest mention of the Habiru is from the Jerusalem letters of Abdi-Heba, directly south at Jerusalem, letters EA 286, 287, 288, 289, and EA 290.

=== Spellings for Habiru in the Amarna letters ===
- EA 75, l. 10—šanitam ga-kal nukurtu ša ^{erìn}-GAZ-MEŠ–.–( However, "warfare" "which of" ^{"ARMY"}'Apiru (Habiru) ... )
- EA 100, l. 26—KUR,.. ša ìl-qú LÚ.MEŠ GAZ,.. [ ištu ]–.]–( LÚ-MEŠ GAZ )
- EA 271, l. 16—..lú-meš Sa-GaZ-meš .. ( Men (pl), SA.GAZ^{MEŠ(pl)}
- EA 290, l. 24—..Ha-Pí-Ri .. ( Hapiru ( 'Apiru ))
- EA 299, l. 18—..da-an-nu LÚ-SA-GAZ-meš .. ( "Strengthening" - LÚ.SA.GAZ.MEŠ ..( "Strengthening Habiru" )
- EA 366, l. 21—.. {LÚ} SA-GAZ .. ( ^{LÚ}SA-GAZ (Habiru))

== See also ==
- Rib-Hadda
- Byblos
- Amarna letters–phrases and quotations
