= Amarna letter EA 299 =

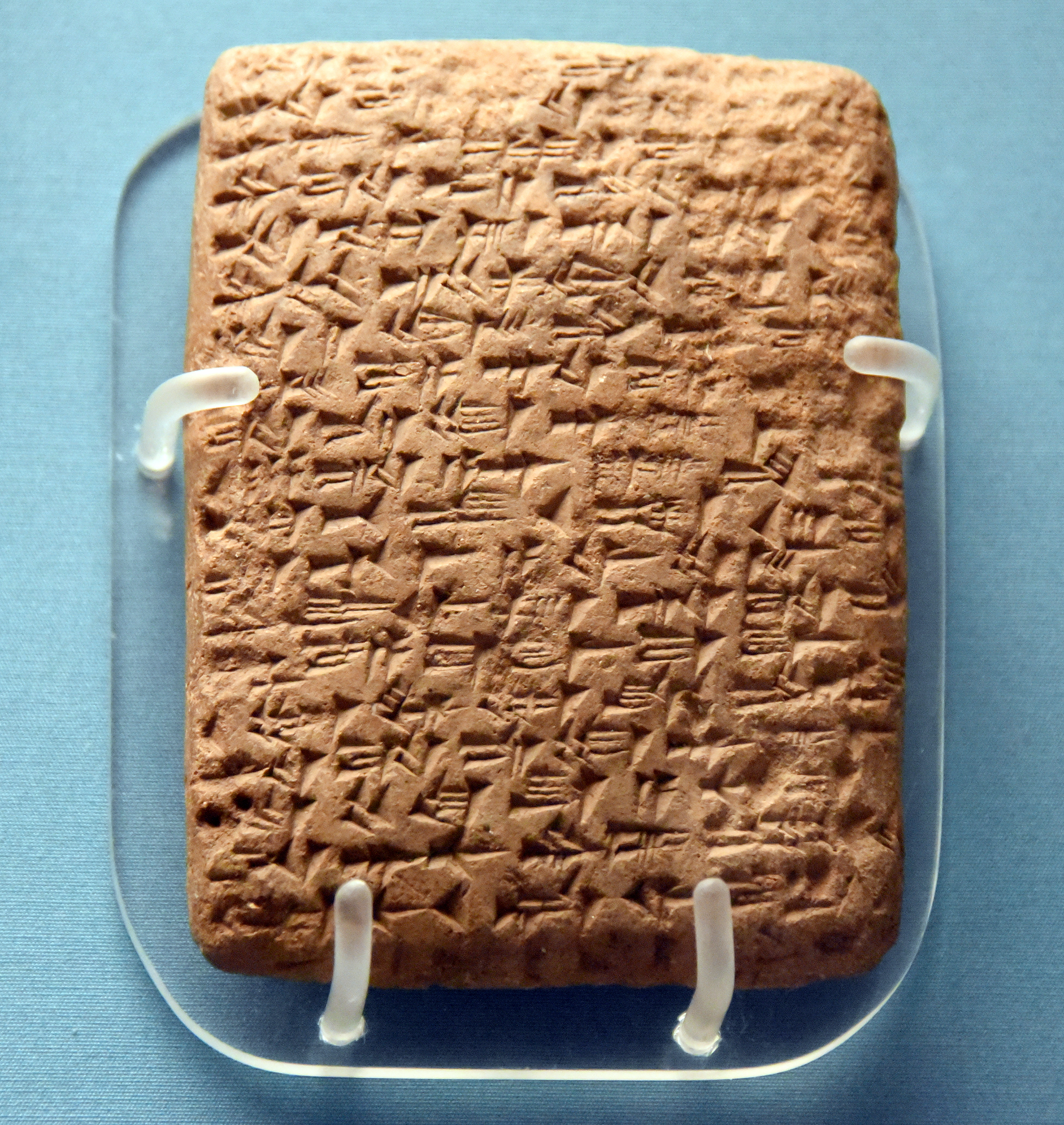
- ME 29832
- Material: Clay
- Height: 12 cm
- Width: 8.5 cm
- Created: c. 1360 BC
- Discovered: Minya, Egypt
- Present location: London, England, United Kingdom

Amarna letter EA 299, titled: "A Plea for Help", is a fairly short clay tablet Amarna letter from "governor" Yapahu of city-state Gazru. The clay tablet surface has been partially eroded, but the cuneiform is still mostly legible.

The tablet is medium in color (lt tan—medium lt chocolate: (see here: )) and is about 12 cm tall, and a wide tablet, about 8.5 cm. The tablet is located in the British Museum, no. 29832.

The Amarna letters, about 300, numbered up to EA 382, are a mid 14th century BC, around 1360 BC and 30–35 years later, correspondence. The initial corpus of letters were found at Akhenaten's city Akhetaten, in the floor of the Bureau of Correspondence of Pharaoh; others were later found, adding to the body of letters.

== The letter ==
=== EA 299: "A Plea for Help" ===
EA 299, letter number three of four from Yapahu of Gazru. (Not a linear, line-by-line translation.)

Obverse (See here: ) (or High Def: )

Paragraph I

(Lines 1-11)—To the king, my lord, my god, the Sun, the Sun [f]rom the sky: Message of Yapahu, the ruler of Gazru, your servant, the dirt at your feet, the groom of your horses. Truly I fall at the feet of the king, my lord, my god, my Sun, the Sun from the sky, 7 times and 7 times, on the stomach and on the back.

Paragraph II

(12-21)—I have listened to the words of the messenger of the king, my lord, very carefully. May the king, my lord, the Sun from the sky, take thought for his land. Since the 'Apiru-(Habiru) are stronger than we, may the king, my lord, (g)ive^{1} me his help,..

Bottom Edge & Reverse (See here: )

(22-26)—..and may the king, my lord, get me^{2} away from the 'Apiru lest the 'Apiru destroy us.–(complete EA 299, with minor lacunae restored, lines 1-26)

== Akkadian & Cuneiform text ==
Paragraph I

(Line 1)—A-na diš-lugal-EN-ia dingir-meš-ia–( To ^{Diš}-King-Lord-mine, (of) ^{d}God(S)-mine.. )
(2)—^{{d}}-meš-ia ^{{d}}-utu ša iš-tu–.–.–.–.–.–.–( ^{d}God{S}-mine, ^{d}Sun-God, .. Which .. From .. )
(3)—an-{ša10-me} um-ma diš-Ya-Pa-iYa–.–(..^{{d}}-Sky; --///-- Message ^{1}-Yapahu ! ..)
(4)—LÚ ša ^{iri}-GaZ-Ri-^{ki}–.–.–.–.–.–( Man(Governor), .. "Which-(of)" ^{iri}-GaZRu-^{ki} !! ) ( ^{Town}-GaZRu-^{ki} )
(5)—ARAD2-ka ep-ri ša giri3-meš-ka–(.. Servant-yours, .. "The Dirt" Which-(at) Feet(S)-yours .. )
(6)—LÚ-ku8-sí anše-KUR-ra-meš
(7)—a-na 2(diš) giri3-meš Lugal-EN-ia
(8)—dingir-meš-ia {d}-utu-ia {d}-utu
(9)—ša iš-tu an-{ša10-me} 7(diš)-šu
(10)—u 7(diš)-ta-a-an lu-ú am-qut-ma
(11)—ka-bat-tum u s,e-ru-ma

Paragraph II

(12)—iš-te-me a-wa-ti7-meš
(13)—LÚ-dumu-ší-ip-ri ša Lugal
(14)—EN-ia ma-gal ma-gal
(15)—u li-im-li-ik Lugal-EN-ia
(16)—{d}-utu ša iš-tu an-{ša10-me}
(17)—a-na kur-^{{ki}}-šu a-nu-ma
(18)—da-an-nu LÚ-SA-GAZ-meš

=== Akkadian ===
(1)—Ana 1-lugal-EN-ia dingir-meš-ia
(2)—^{{d}}-meš-ia ^{{d}}-utu ša ištu
(3)—an-{ša10-me}, .. --///-- umma ^{diš}-YaPaiYa-(Yapahu) !
(4)—LÚ, .. ša ^{iri}-GaZ-Ri-^{ki}-(Gazru) !!

== Cuneiform score, Akkadian, English ==
Cuneiform score (per CDLI, Chicago Digital Library Initiative), and Akkadian, and English.

Obverse

Paragraph I, (lines 1-11)

1.A-na ^{1=diš}lugal _EN_-ia _DINGIR-MEŠ_-ia
___Ana ^{1=diš}ŠÀR-ru Bēlu-ia, – _DINGIR-MEŠ_-ia
___To ^{1=}King Lord-mine, – (of) Gods^{pl.}-mine
2. _^{{d}}UTU_-ia _^{{d}}UTU_ ša iš^{#}-tu
___^{{d}}dingir-ia, —
___^{{d}}God-mine, —
2.4.------------ _^{{d}}UTU_ ša iš^{#}-tu
___---------------^{{d}}Dingir, – ša iš^{#}tu
___---------------God, – which from
3.an-{ša10-me} um-ma diš-Ya-Pa-iYa
___^{dingir}-{ša10-me}
___(the)-Sky
3.4.-------------um-ma ^{1=diš}Ya-Pa-'i3
___-------------umma ^{1=diš}Ya-Pa-'i3
___---------------message ^{1}Yapahu
4.LÚ ša ^{iri}-GaZ-Ri-^{ki}

== The Habiru/'Apiru ==

The mention of the Habiru shows the conflict of the time, as the takeover of city-states or regions by the Habiru. The map shows various cities and regions, and their respective dealings with the Habiru. (There are only 3 letters from Labaya of Šakmu/Shechem.) The next closest mention of the Habiru is from the Jerusalem letters of Abdi-Heba, directly south at Jerusalem, letters EA 286, 287, 288, 289, and EA 290.

=== Spellings for Habiru in the Amarna letters ===
- EA 100, l. 26—KUR,.. ša ìl-qú LÚ.MEŠ GAZ,.. [ ištu ]–.]–( LÚ-MEŠ GAZ )
- EA 271, l. 16—..lú-meš Sa-GaZ-meš .. ( Men (pl), SA.GAZ^{MEŠ(pl)}
- EA 290, l. 24—..Ha-Pí-Ri .. ( Hapiru ( 'Apiru ))
- EA 299, l. 18—..da-an-nu LÚ-SA-GAZ-meš .. ( "Strengthening" - LÚ.SA.GAZ.MEŠ ..( "Strengthening Habiru" )
- EA 366, l. 21—.. {LÚ} SA-GAZ .. ( ^{LÚ}SA-GAZ (Habiru))

== See also ==
- Amarna letters–phrases and quotations
- List of Amarna letters by size
