= Amarna letter EA 365 =

Babylonian clay tablet

Amarna letter EA 365 (Titled Furnishing Corvée Workers)
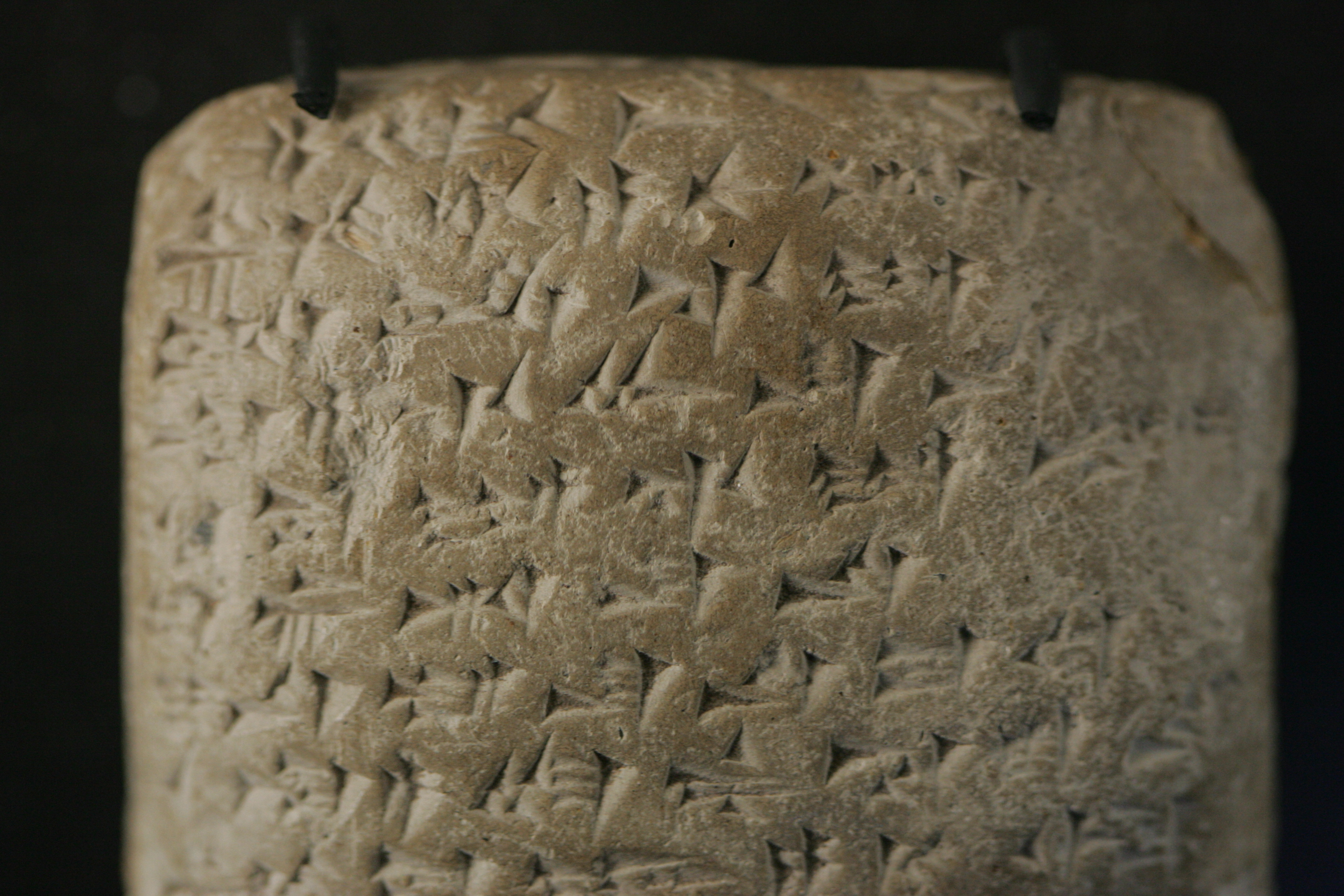
- Reverse, Upper & Lower views

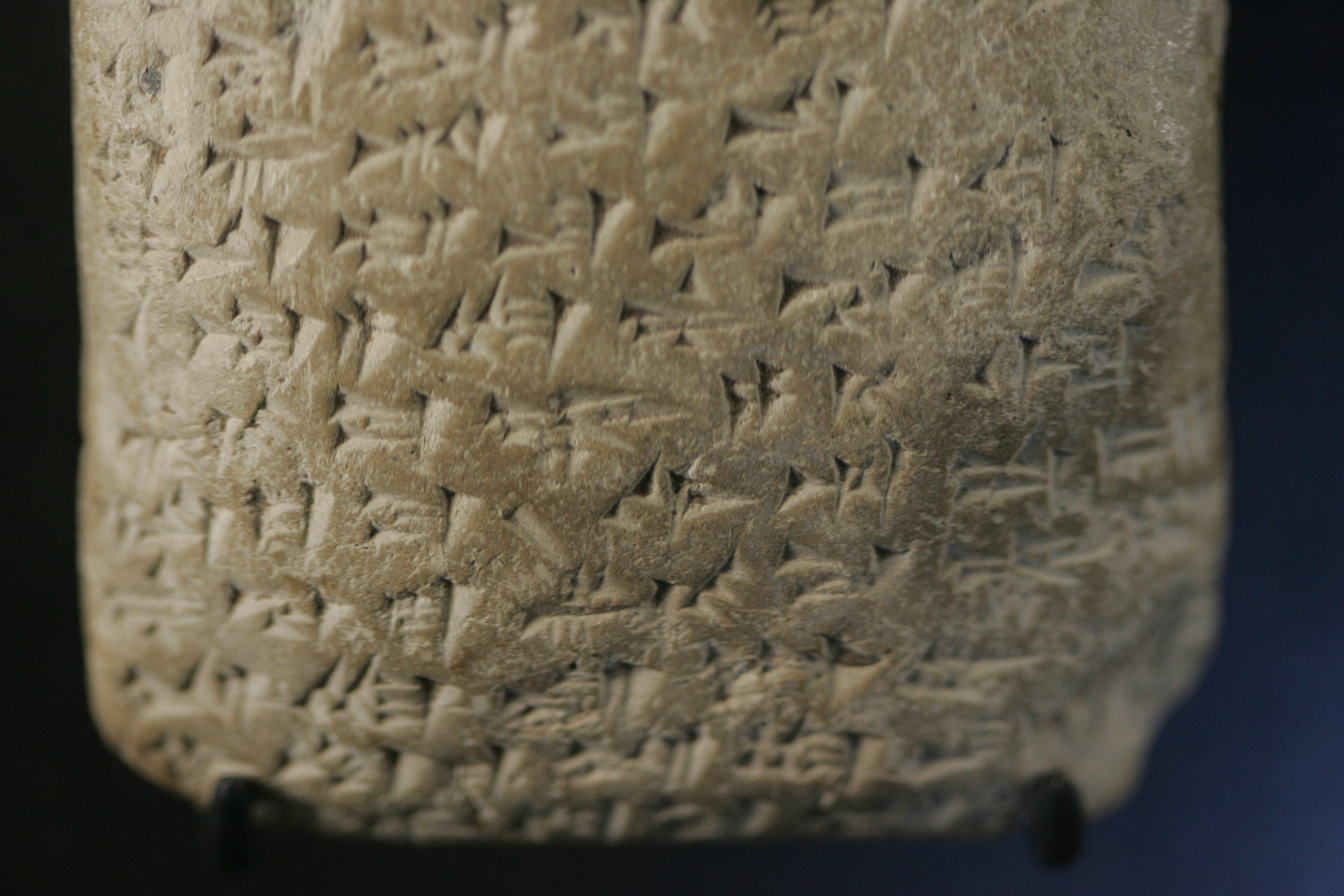
- Material: Clay
- Size: Height: 6.5 cm (2.6 in); Width: 6.0 cm (2.4 in)
- Writing: cuneiform (Akkadian language)
- Created: ~1360-1335 BC (Amarna Period)
- Period/culture: Middle Babylonian
- Place: Akhetaten & Megiddo
- Present location: Louvre (Antiquités orientales AO 7098)

Amarna letter EA 365, titled Furnishing Corvée Workers, is a squarish, mostly flat clay tablet, but thick enough (pillow-shaped), to contain text that continues toward the right margin, the right side of the obverse side, and also to the right side of the reverse side of the tablet.

The text is continuous, such that a final line (line 31) is needed, and is written on a final available edge of the tablet – thus text is found upon 5 sections — Obverse, Bottom Edge, Reverse, Top Edge, and Side.

Letter EA 365 is authored by Biridiya of Megiddo and is written to the Pharaoh of Egypt (in the 14th century BC, Egypt referred to as Mizri/Miṣri). The letter's subject is the harvesting of crops by corvée (forced) labor men/women.

The Amarna letters, about 300, numbered up to EA 382, are mid 14th century BC, about 1360 BC and 35? years later, correspondence. The initial corpus of letters were found at Akhenaten's city Akhetaten, in the floor of the Bureau of Correspondence of Pharaoh; others were later found, adding to the body of letters.

== Text of EA 365, reverse ==
=== Reverse, top half ===
(Start of Reverse)

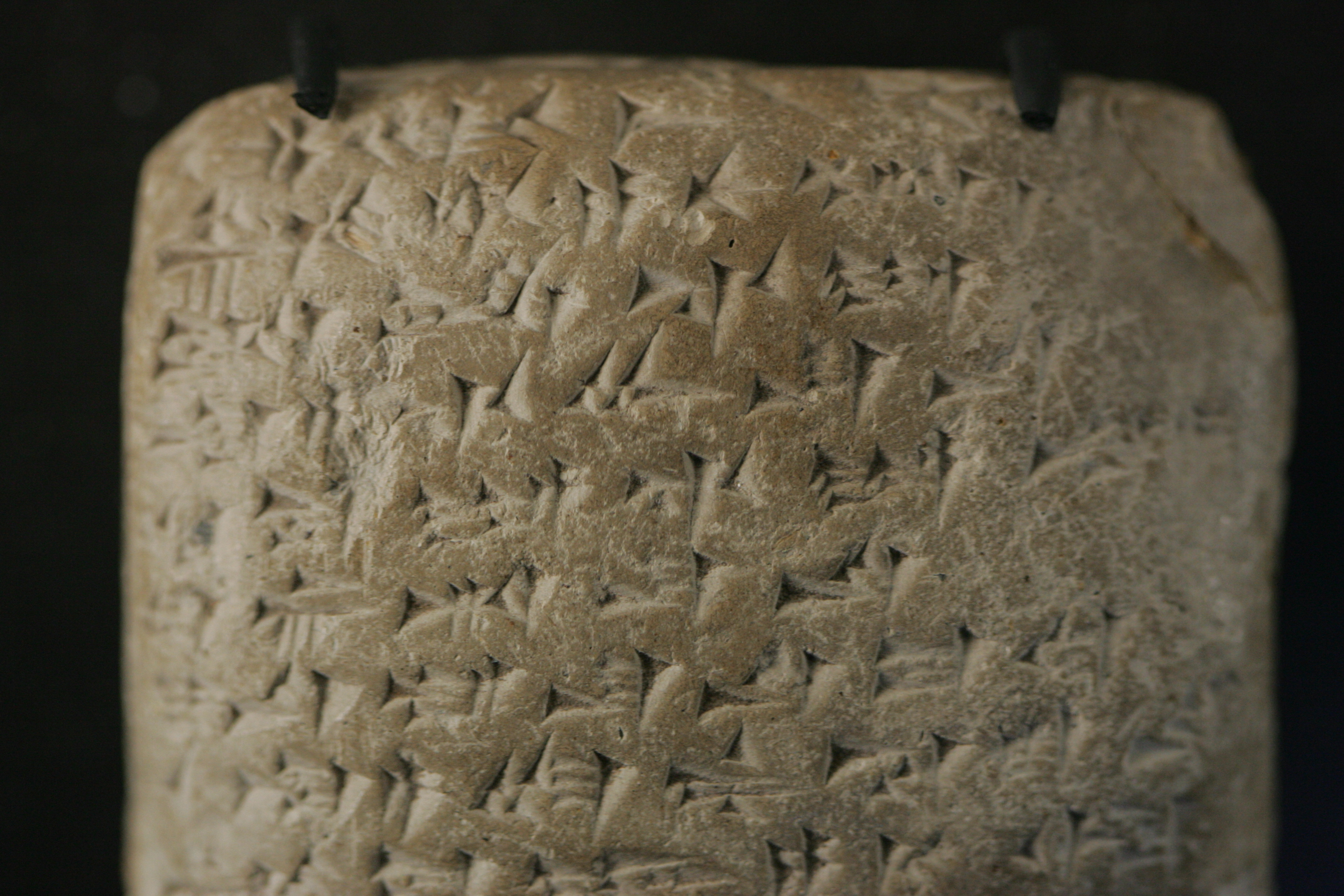
Reverse Top Half

The following English language text, and Akkadian is from Rainey, 1970, El Amarna Tablets, 359-379:

(Line 15)--But-(=and) see! (But Look!, the major topic segue)
(16)--The city rulers
(17)--who are with me
(18)--are not doing
(19)--as I. They are not
(20)--cultivating
(21)--in Šunama ("(city)-Šunama-(yours)")
(22)--and they are not furnishing
(23)--corvée workers; and
(end photo top half)
(24)--as for me, (gl (AL) (:"))..i.e. (all by myself),
(25)--I am furnishing corvée workers.
(26)--From Yapû ("(city)-Yapu-(yours)")
(27)--they have come, from th[em]
(28)--(as well as) from here, and fro[m]
(29)--Nuribta
(Side-Lines 30-31)--And may the King, my Lord, be apprised concerning his city.

Reverse, top half, Akkadian:

(Bottom half of Reverse)

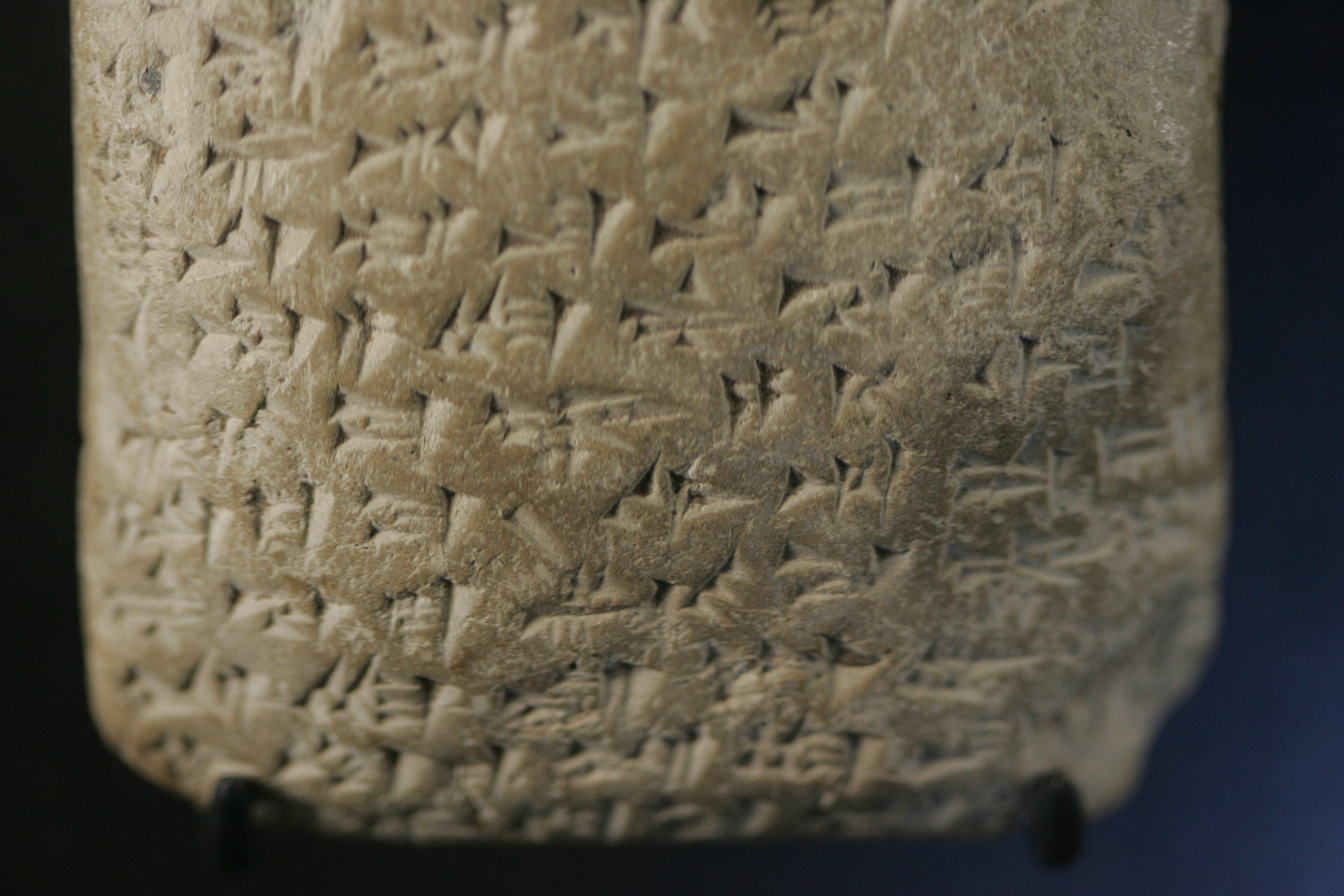
Reverse Bottom Half

(15)--u-(Note:-slightly visible) a-mur-me
(16)--LÚ.MEŠ-(meš--note:biotic plant material in clay)-ha-za-na-tu-meš
(17)--ša it-ti-ia
(18)--la-a- ti-pu-šu-na
(19)--ki-(damaged/+ on tablet edge)-ma ia-ti-ia
(20)--te-er-ri-šu-na
(21)--i-na URU-Šu-Na-Ma-ki
(22)--u la-a tu-ub-ba-lu-na
(23)--LÚ.MEŠ-ma-as-sà-meš Ù
(end photo top half)
(24)--a-na-ku-ma gl (AL) (:") ya-hu-du-un-ni
(25)--ub-ba-lu LÚ.MEŠ-ma-as-sà-meš
(26)--iš-tu URU-iYa-Pu-ki
(27)--(yi(=pi)), yi-la-ku iš-tu šu-nu
(28)--an-ni-ki-ma iš-t[u ]
(29)--[ URU ] Nu-Ri-iB-Tá-ki
(30)--[ u ] li-di-mi
(Side of clay tablet)
(31)--LUGAL-EN-ia a-na URU-ki-("city-yours")/ šu-("-His")

== Reverse, bottom half, and Moran translation (lines 15-31) ==
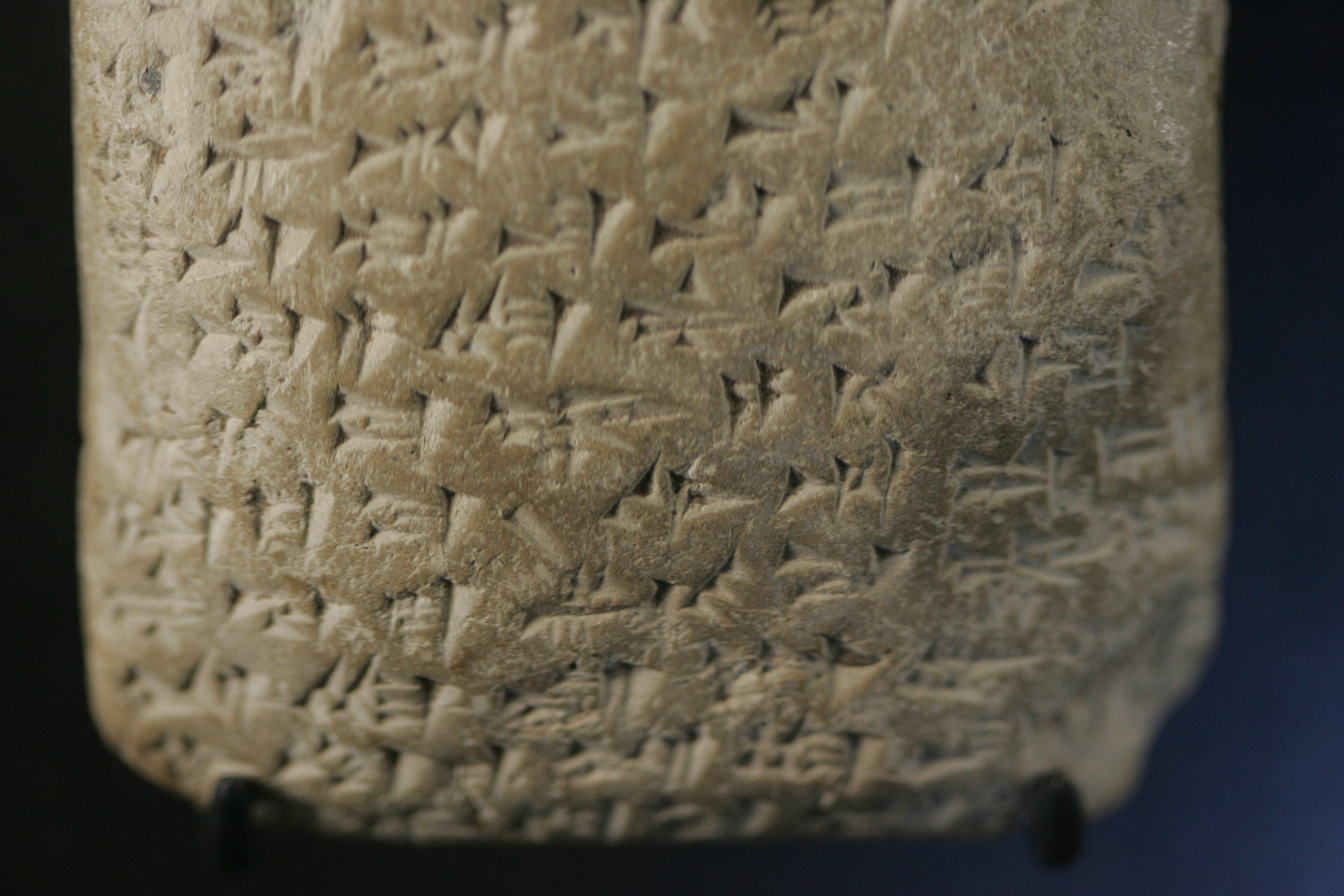
EA 365, Reverse, (bottom half). (high resolution expandible photo)

Moran's non-linear letter English language translation (translated from the French language):

(Lines 1-7)--"Say [to the ki]ng, my lord and my [Su]n: Message of Biridiya, the loyal servant of the king. I fall at the feet of the king, my lord and my Sun, 7 times and 7 times.
(8-14)--May the king, my lord, take cognizance of his servant and his city. In fact only I am cultivating: (gl (AL)} ah-ri-šu in Šunama, and only I am furnishing corvée workers.

EA 365, Reverse:

(15-23)--But consider the mayors that are near me. They do not act as I do. They do not cultivate in Šunama ("City-ŠuNaMa-(His)") and they do furnish corvée workers.
(24-31)--Only I: (gl (AL)} ia_{8}-hu-du-un-ni (by myself) furnish corvée workers. From (City) Yapu they come, from [my] resources here, (and) from (City)-Nuribta-(Nu-Ri-iB-Ta). And may the king, my lord, take cognizance of his city. --(complete EA 365, with minor lacunae, lines 1-31)

== Gallery ==
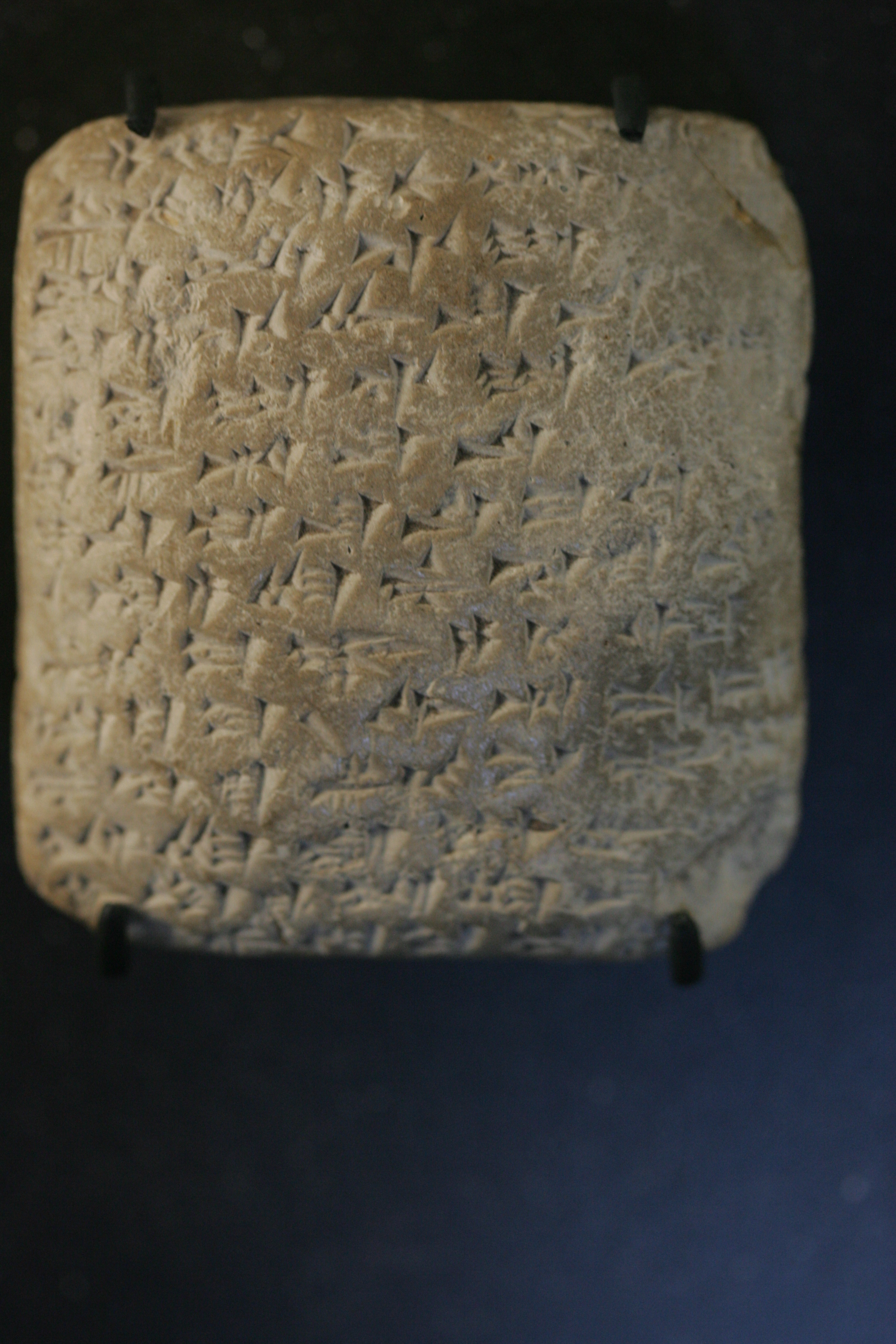
Full EA 365, Reverse

== See also ==
- Amarna letters–phrases and quotations
- Biridiya
- Corvée (Forced labor)
- Glossenkeil (Amarna letters)
- List of Amarna letters by size
  - Amarna letter EA 5, EA 9, EA 15, EA 19, EA 26, EA 27, EA 35, EA 38
  - EA 153, EA 161, EA 288, EA 364, EA 365, EA 367
