= Zu (cuneiform) =

Cuneiform sign

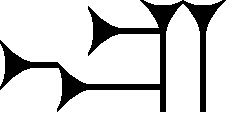
Digitized form of cuneiform zu, sú, ṣú, or Sumerogram ZU.

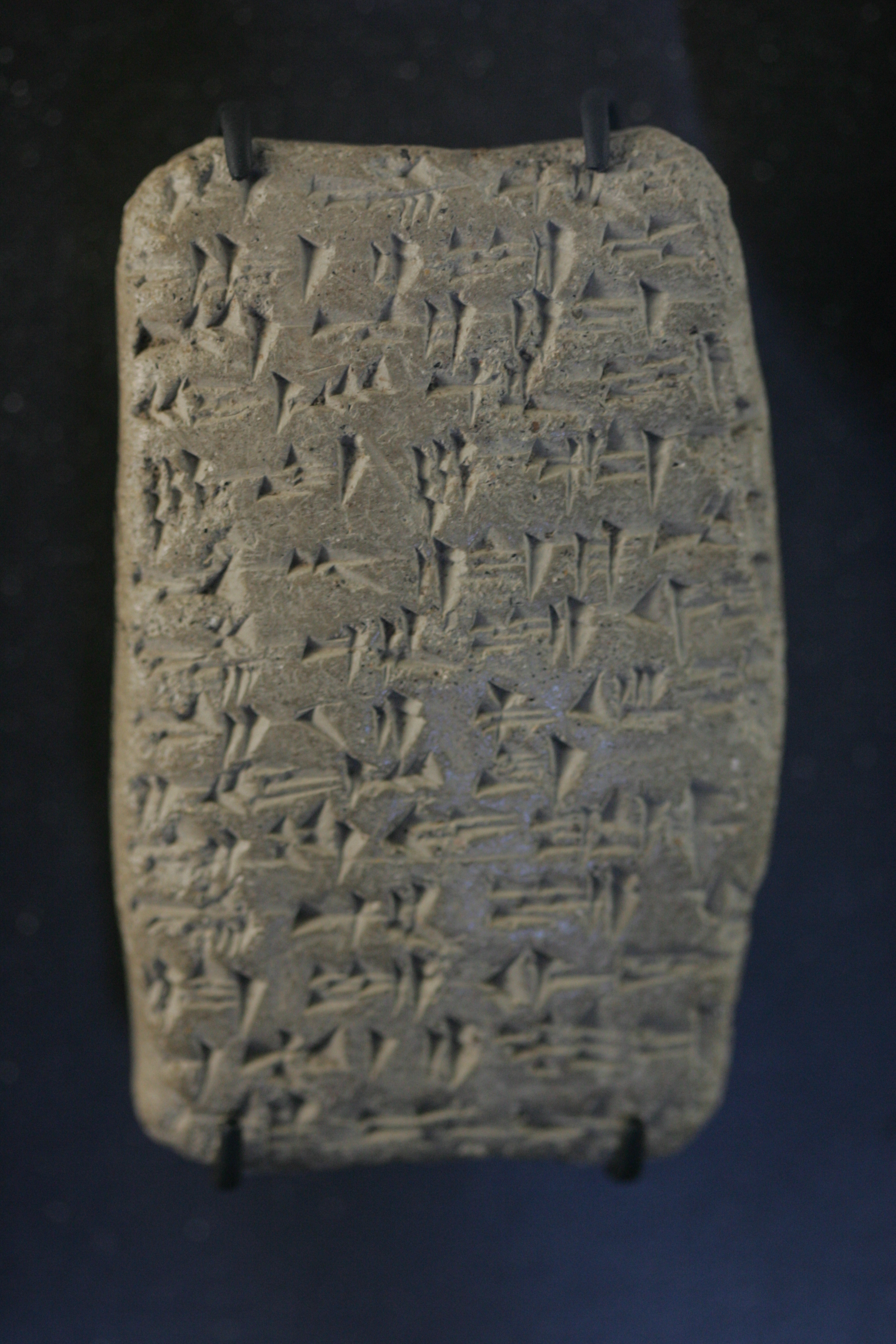
EA 364, Obverse. Line 18, city Hazor: (Ha-sǘ-ra) (high resolution expandible photo)

Cuneiform zu, (also sú, ṣú, and Sumerogram ZU (capital letter majuscule)), is an uncommon-use sign in the 1350s BC Amarna letters, the Epic of Gilgamesh, and other cuneiform texts. Alphabetically, it could conceivably be used for letters z, s, ṣ, or u; however in the Amarna letters it is used mostly for personal names or geographical names.

In the Epic of Gilgamesh, Sumerogram ZU is used to spell the name of god Ninazu, (a name of god Tammuz, two times, Chapter XII, 28, 47). In the Epic, ZU is also used as a logogram, ZU.AB, for Akkadian language "apsû", English language "abyss"; it is used twice in Chapter VIII, and twice in Chapter XI, the Gilgamesh flood myth. It was also used to name Giant Squid Studios' game, Abzû.

== Uses of zu ==
=== Epic of Gilgamesh ===
The usage numbers for zu in the Epic of Gilgamesh are as follows: sú-(1) time, ṣú-(0), zu-(41), and ZU-(7) times.

=== Partial list of uses in Amarna letters ===
- EA 100, ^{City}Subaru, (Sú-ba-ru),
- EA 245, Surata, (Sú-ra-ta), -ra- (personal name)
- EA 364, ^{City}Hazor, (Ha-sú-ra), Ha--ra
