= Giš =

Cuneiform sign

A common form of giš, is, iz, iṣ, and sumerogram GIŠ, etc.

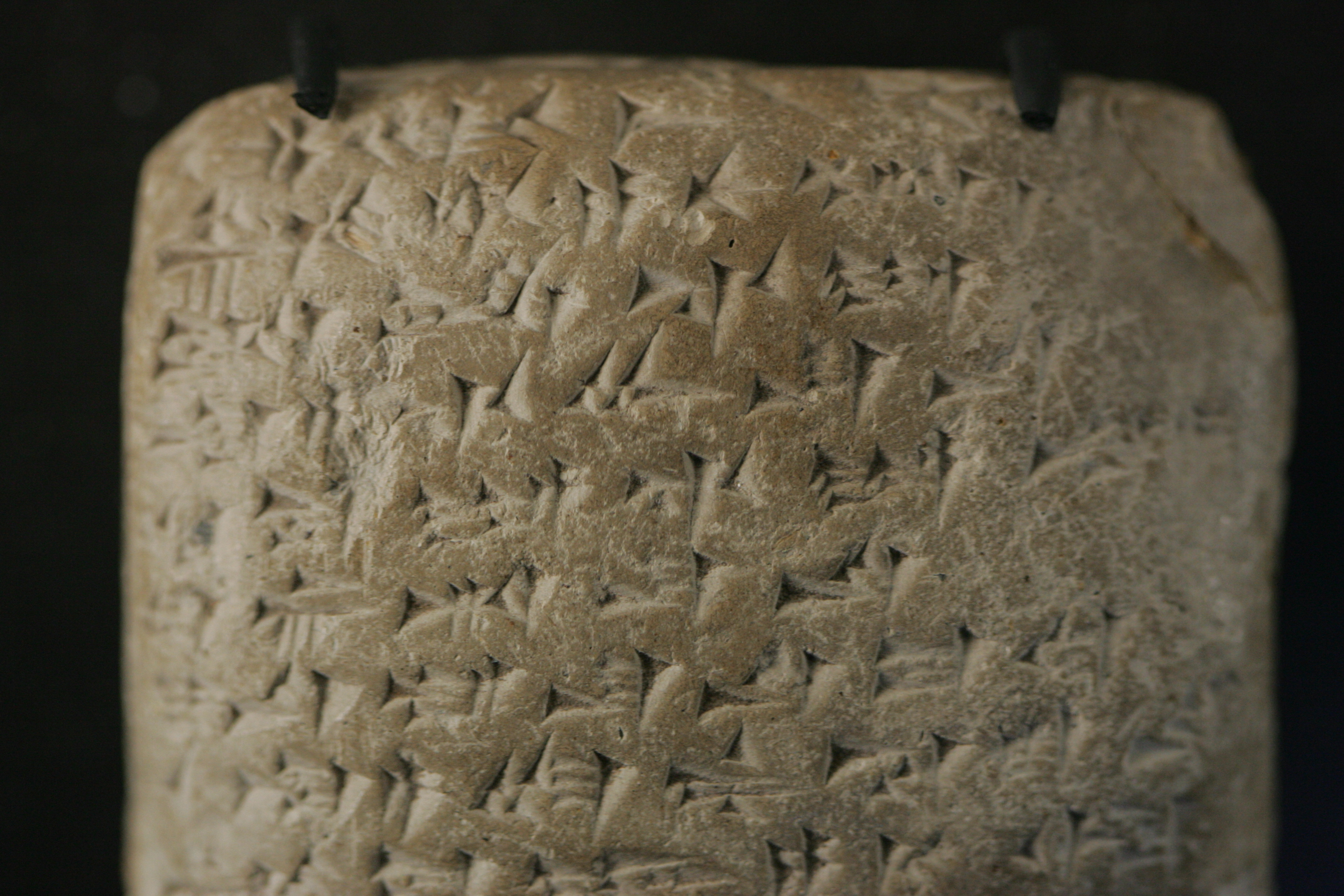
(A typical Amarna letter.) Amarna letter EA 365-(Reverse), by Biridiya of Magiddo, title: "Furnishing Corvee Workers"; (Very high resolution expandable photo.)

The cuneiform giš sign, (also common for is, iṣ, and iz), is a common, multi-use sign, in the Epic of Gilgamesh, the Amarna letters, and other cuneiform texts. It also has a major usage as a sumerogram, GIŠ, (capital letter (majuscule)) for English language "wood", and is used as a determinative at the beginning of words, for items made of wood. The 12 Chapters (Tablets) of the Epic of Gilgamesh lists 16 named items beginning with "GIŠ".

For giš/(is/iz/iṣ) in the construction of words it is used syllabically for giš, and syllabically for the three other constructs; also for eṣ/ez. Besides "giš", it can alphabetically be used for: e, i, s, ṣ, or z.

== Epic of Gilgamesh sign usage ==
The usage numbers for giš in the Epic of Gilgamesh are as follows: eṣ-(2) times, ez, (3), giš, (1), is, (46), iṣ, (77), iz, (17), and GIŠ (355) times.

=== Epic words with determinative GIŠ ===
The following list of Akkadian language words are from the sumerograms used in the Epic of Gilgamesh.

- --GIŠ.APIN, epinnu ("plow")
- --GIŠ.BAN, qaštu (?)
- --GIŠ.BANŠUR, paššūru ("table")
- --GIŠ.ERIN, erēnu ("cedar")
- --GIŠ.GAG, sikkatu ("flask (of perfume)")
- --GIŠ.GIGIR, mugirru (?)
- --GIŠ.GU.ZA, kussû ("throne", "seat")
- --GIŠ.IG, daltu ("door")
- --GIŠ.MÁ, eleppu ("boat, ship")
- --GIŠ.NIM, baltu ("thornbush")
- --GIŠ.SAR, kirû ("garden", "orchard")
- --GIŠ.ŠEM.GIR, asu ("myrtle")
- --GIŠ.ŠUR.MÌN, šurmenu ("cypress")
- --GIŠ.TIR, qištu ("forest")
- --GIŠ.TUKUL, kakku ("weapon")
- --GIŠ.Ú.GIR, ašagu ("thistle", "thorn bush")
