= Glossenkeil (Amarna letters) =

Cuneiform sign

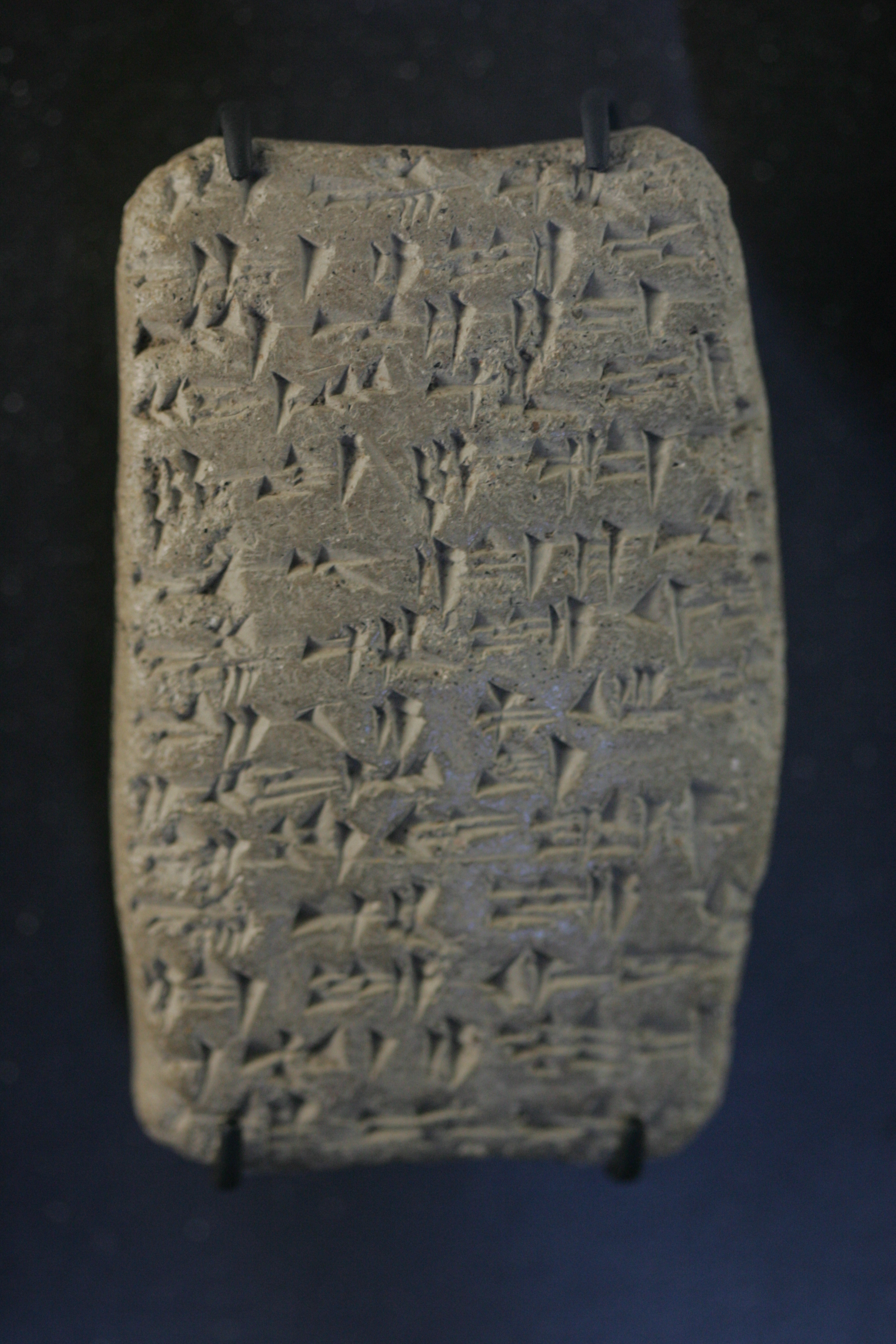
EA 365, a good example of the glossenkeil (Amarna letters), (line 8). (very high-resolution expandable photo)

The Glossenkeil (Amarna letters), is a form of the common glossenkeil—𒃵 used in the history of cuneiform texts. It is also named a winkelhaken; however the distinct "U" character in cuneiform–-(for the winkelhaken), has multiple uses (see u (cuneiform)), and winkelhakens are composed of the single "u", or a doubled version, one "u" above a second "u".

The glossenkeil (Amarna letters)– is a foreshortened version of the vertical diš (cuneiform)–, and is inscribed at a 45-degree angle.

Because the scribe's stylus is being used at an angle, (almost any corner of a stylus end could be used); if a scribe had two styli, of differing sizes, and both ends shaped for inscribing, that automatically implies at least four types of stylus tip impressions that could be made (from the two, double-ended styli). As an example of the stroke of a stylus, the Jerusalem scribe, in EA 287, has created a 4–stroke ri (cuneiform) sign from the 5–stroke, "ri" sign, by sweeping the left horizontal stroke, as the beginning of 2 strokes, and finishing the sweep of the stylus at the small angled intermediate stroke; (the Jerusalem scribe's stroke could easily be started in reverse order).

== See also ==
- Amarna letter EA 245
- Amarna letter EA 252
- Amarna letter EA 282
- Amarna letter EA 287
- Amarna letter EA 364
- Amarna letter EA 365
- Amarna letter EA 147—(which uses the Winkelhaken glossenkeil)
