= MÁ =

Cuneiform sign

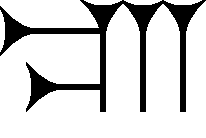
Digital rendering of the sign MÁ. In the variant found in the Amarna letters, the lower horizontal crosses all three verticals.

The cuneiform sign MÁ denotes a ship or boat. It is used in Sumerian and as a Sumerogram for the Akkadian word eleppu (also 'ship'/'boat'). MÁ is usually preceded by the determinative for items made of wood, namely GIŠ: GIŠ.MÁ, or ^{GIŠ}.MÁ,.

== Examples ==
The Epic of Gilgamesh lists sixteen wood-related words written with the GIŠ determinative, among them GIŠ.MÁ/eleppu. The epic also uses the 'ship'/'boat' Sumerogram in Tablet XI (the Gilgamesh flood myth), and elsewhere when Gilgamesh is taken by boat.

Some of the Amarna letters using the Sumerogram are EA 86, EA 153, EA 149, EA 245, and EA 364.

== See also ==
- Amarna letter EA 86
- Amarna letter EA 153
- Amarna letter EA 245

== Bibliography ==
- Simo Parpola; Kalle Fabritius (1997). Simo Parpola; Mikko Luukko; Kalle Fabritius (eds.). The standard Babylonian Epic of Gilgamesh : cuneiform text, transliteration, glossary, indices and sign list. Translated by Simo Parpola. Neo-Assyrian Text Corpus Project (Contributor). Helsinki: Neo-Assyrian Text Corpus Project. ISBN 951-45-7760-4. OCLC 38502035. (Volume 1) in the original Akkadian cuneiform and transliteration; commentary and glossary are in English
