= É (cuneiform) =

Cuneiform sign

Cuneiform en; also EN.

The cuneiform sign É, is a common-use sign of the Amarna letters, the Epic of Gilgamesh, and other cuneiform texts (for example Hittite texts). its most common usage is for the logogram "É", which in the Akkadian language is bītu, (for English: "house"), (and why bit / pit is listed in the alphabetic usages.)

Linguistically, it has the alphabetical usage in texts for bit, pit, pet, in the Epic of Gilgamesh. In Amarna letter EA 290 for Bit^{d}NIN.URTA.

== Epic of Gilgamesh usage ==
The É sign usage in the Epic of Gilgamesh is as follows: bit, 11 times, pet, 1 time, pit, 7 times, and É, 64 times.
