= Suratá =

- Municipality and town
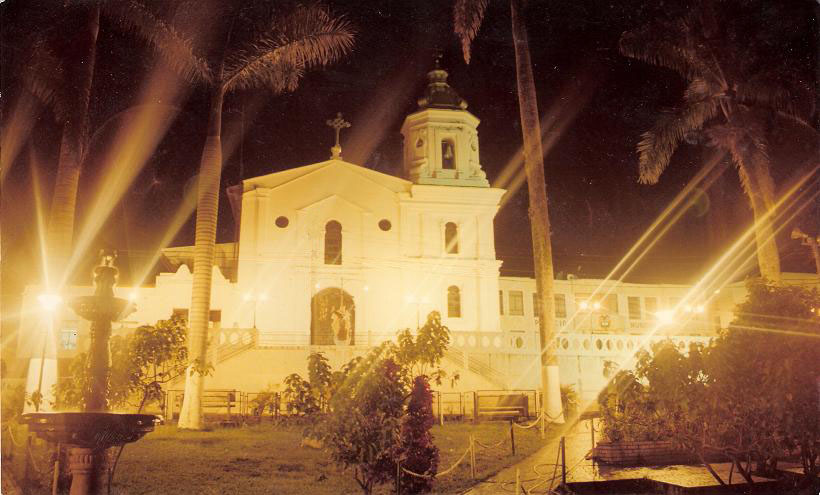

- Flag

- Location of the municipality and town of Suratá in the Santander Department of Colombia
- Coordinates: 7°22′N 72°59′W
- Country: Colombia
- Department: Santander Department
- Time zone: UTC-5 (Colombia Standard Time)

Suratá is a town and municipality in the Santander Department in northeastern Colombia.

== Climate ==
Climate data for Suratá (Vivero Surata), elevation 1,725 m (5,659 ft), (1981–2010)
Month	Jan	Feb	Mar	Apr	May	Jun	Jul	Aug	Sep	Oct	Nov	Dec	Year
Mean daily maximum °C (°F)	22.7 (72.9)	23.1 (73.6)	23.2 (73.8)	22.8 (73.0)	22.6 (72.7)	22.8 (73.0)	22.9 (73.2)	23.0 (73.4)	22.4 (72.3)	21.9 (71.4)	21.9 (71.4)	22.2 (72.0)	22.6 (72.7)
Daily mean °C (°F)	17.5 (63.5)	18.0 (64.4)	18.0 (64.4)	17.8 (64.0)	17.9 (64.2)	18.0 (64.4)	17.8 (64.0)	17.8 (64.0)	17.4 (63.3)	17.2 (63.0)	17.3 (63.1)	17.4 (63.3)	17.7 (63.9)
Mean daily minimum °C (°F)	12.4 (54.3)	13.0 (55.4)	13.3 (55.9)	13.6 (56.5)	13.9 (57.0)	13.8 (56.8)	13.3 (55.9)	13.5 (56.3)	13.3 (55.9)	13.2 (55.8)	13.0 (55.4)	12.7 (54.9)	13.2 (55.8)
Average precipitation mm (inches)	18.1 (0.71)	31.0 (1.22)	58.9 (2.32)	143.4 (5.65)	157.4 (6.20)	72.8 (2.87)	52.0 (2.05)	89.2 (3.51)	147.2 (5.80)	200.8 (7.91)	110.7 (4.36)	36.3 (1.43)	1,117.8 (44.01)
Average precipitation days	5	7	10	16	17	12	13	16	20	20	15	8	159
Average relative humidity (%)	81	80	82	86	87	85	83	84	85	88	88	84	85
Mean monthly sunshine hours	210.8	177.8	170.5	132.0	133.3	144.0	167.4	155.0	132.0	124.0	141.0	182.9	1,870.7
Mean daily sunshine hours	6.8	6.3	5.5	4.4	4.3	4.8	5.4	5.0	4.4	4.0	4.7	5.9	5.1
Source: Instituto de Hidrologia Meteorologia y Estudios Ambientales

Climate data for Suratá (Cachiri), elevation 1,850 m (6,070 ft), (1981–2010)
Month	Jan	Feb	Mar	Apr	May	Jun	Jul	Aug	Sep	Oct	Nov	Dec	Year
Mean daily maximum °C (°F)	24.7 (76.5)	25.3 (77.5)	25.0 (77.0)	24.3 (75.7)	23.7 (74.7)	23.6 (74.5)	24.1 (75.4)	24.2 (75.6)	24.3 (75.7)	23.7 (74.7)	23.4 (74.1)	23.7 (74.7)	24.2 (75.6)
Daily mean °C (°F)	18.6 (65.5)	18.7 (65.7)	18.7 (65.7)	18.5 (65.3)	18.5 (65.3)	18.5 (65.3)	18.6 (65.5)	18.7 (65.7)	18.5 (65.3)	18.2 (64.8)	18.3 (64.9)	18.4 (65.1)	18.5 (65.3)
Mean daily minimum °C (°F)	13.1 (55.6)	13.3 (55.9)	13.8 (56.8)	14.3 (57.7)	14.6 (58.3)	14.4 (57.9)	14.1 (57.4)	14.2 (57.6)	14.1 (57.4)	14.1 (57.4)	14.1 (57.4)	13.5 (56.3)	14.0 (57.2)
Average precipitation mm (inches)	30.4 (1.20)	45.4 (1.79)	80.9 (3.19)	150.3 (5.92)	145.7 (5.74)	66.8 (2.63)	39.2 (1.54)	72.7 (2.86)	126.4 (4.98)	180.4 (7.10)	135.1 (5.32)	49.2 (1.94)	1,122.7 (44.20)
Average precipitation days	6	8	11	17	17	12	10	14	18	20	15	8	155
Average relative humidity (%)	81	81	81	84	84	84	83	82	83	85	85	83	83
Mean monthly sunshine hours	207.7	175.0	164.3	129.0	124.0	129.0	158.1	155.0	138.0	130.2	150.0	179.8	1,840.1
Mean daily sunshine hours	6.7	6.2	5.3	4.3	4.0	4.3	5.1	5.0	4.6	4.2	5.0	5.8	5.0
Source: Instituto de Hidrologia Meteorologia y Estudios Ambientales
