= Hi (cuneiform) =

Cuneiform sign

Cuneiform sign for hi/he. Also DǛG, HI, and ŠÁR.

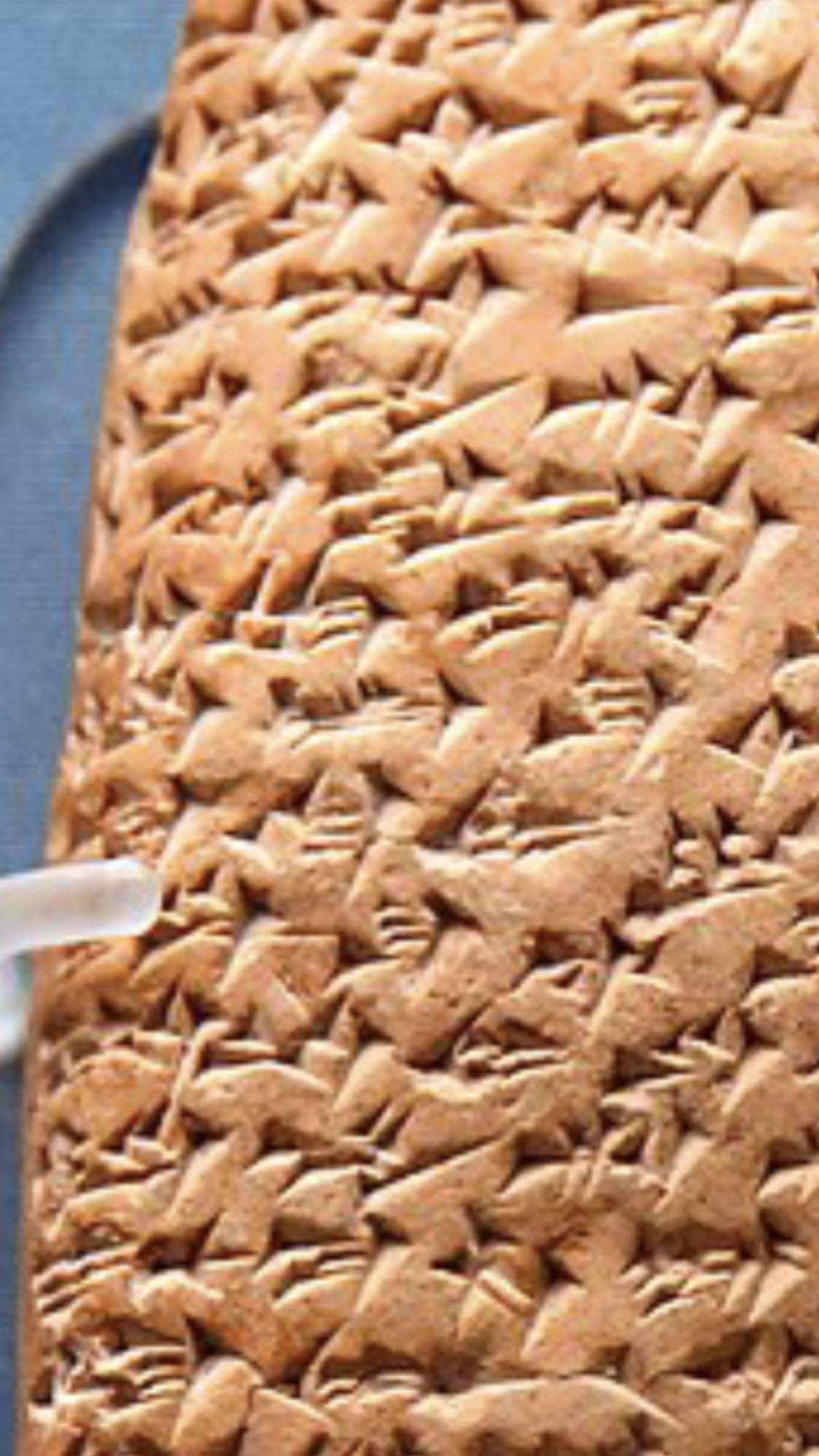
Crop of (Reverse) of Amarna letter EA 245, showing cuneiform hi, beginning of spelling of city-state Hannathon. (7th line from top, last sign) Spelled on line 32, Hi-na-tu-na. (very high resolution, expandible photo)

The cuneiform hi/he sign, (and its Sumerograms), has many uses in both the 14th century BC Amarna letters and the Epic of Gilgamesh; also other texts, for example Hittite texts. It is also used to form a second usage of the plural HI.A,. The more common plural is Meš, found in sub-varieties of the sign, a vertical (left), and a horizontal, with 3 wedges, in various position(right); (a digital form)-.

The alphabetic/syllabic uses and Sumerograms of the 'hi' sign from the Epic of Gilgamesh:

he
hi
DÙG (Sumerogram)s
HI
ŠÁR, = Akkadian šar, (3600), (area of land).

Its usage numbers from the Epic of Gilgamesh are as follows: he-(5), hi-(86), DǛG-(3), HI-(6), and ŠÁR-(13).
