= Diš =

Cuneiform sign

Cuneiform for ana, diš, tiš and 1.

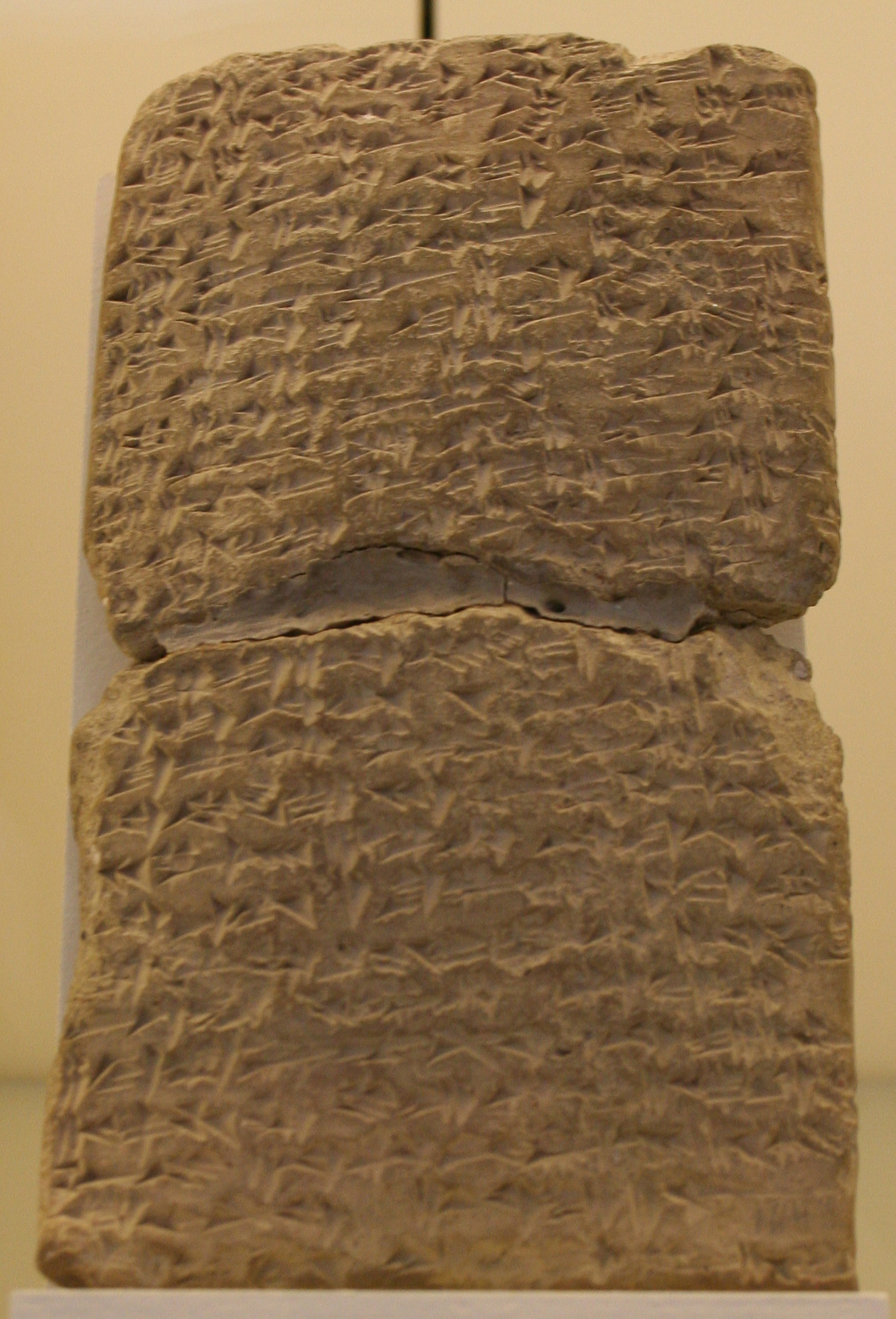
Amarna letter EA 288 which uses cuneiform diš.

Diš is a cuneiform sign represented by 𒁹 or. It has many uses in cuneiform texts, including in the Epic of Gilgamesh.

== Description ==
𒁹 is a cuneiform sign. In Unicode, it is represented by U+12079 (DISH)

== Use of the vertical sign ==
In the Amarna letters, it is commonly used to denote Male individuals. (Women are denoted by sal (cuneiform),. )

The sign is also used to denote "numbers of items". The sign is used for 1. Examples of multiple uses in the Amarna letters, is to address the Pharaoh, often as "servant-yours, at 2 Feet, .. I bow." An example of multiple uses in the Amarna letters, often the bowing down is done: " .. 7 and 7 times (I bow) !", with seven small strokes as units of number "1".

== Epic of Gilgamesh usage ==
In the Epic of Gilgamesh, there are also uses for "diš", and "tiš". (In the Akkadian language, "d" & "t", are interchangeable (voiced vs unvoiced). The ana, (diš) sign usage in the Epic of Gilgamesh is as follows: ana-(151 times); diš-(6); tiš-(6); and 1-(87 times).

== The glossenkeil usage of the angled sign ==
Many of the Amarna letters use glossenkeils, of two varieties: type 1: 𒃵, and type 2: (gl (AL)). Type 2 is found in example letters: EA 364, EA 245, and EA 287. (In CDLI listings (Chicago Digital Library Initiative), it is represented in transcription as ":". Likewise in the Moran, William L. translations.) Type 1 can be found in Amarna example letter EA 147.

The type 2 glossenkeil, is a shortened version of the large-angled-stroke, type 2; (the long stroke of the sign is slightly, or majorly, foreshortened. In the Amarna letters, often down to 50% of the "full stroke".). The high quality photo of EA 364, line 8, shows the length about 3/4 of a full stroke-length.

== See also ==
- Glossenkeil (Amarna letters)
