= En (cuneiform) =

Cuneiform sign

Cuneiform en; also EN.

Some forms of cuneiform en show a large vertical stroke in the median of the horizontal stroke.

The cuneiform sign en, is a common-use sign of the Amarna letters, the Epic of Gilgamesh, and other cuneiform texts (for example Hittite texts). It has a secondary sub-use in the Amarna letters for ka4.

Linguistically, it has the alphabetical usage in texts for n, e, or en, and also a replacement for "e", by vowels, a, or i, or u.

== Epic of Gilgamesh usage ==
The en sign usage in the Epic of Gilgamesh is as follows: (en, 32 times, and EN, 184 times). EN in the Epic of Gilgamesh is used for Akkadian, adi (English "until, plus", and Akkdian bēlu), for "lord, owner".
