= Di (cuneiform) =

Cuneiform sign

The common form of di/de, and sumerograms, DI and SÁ.

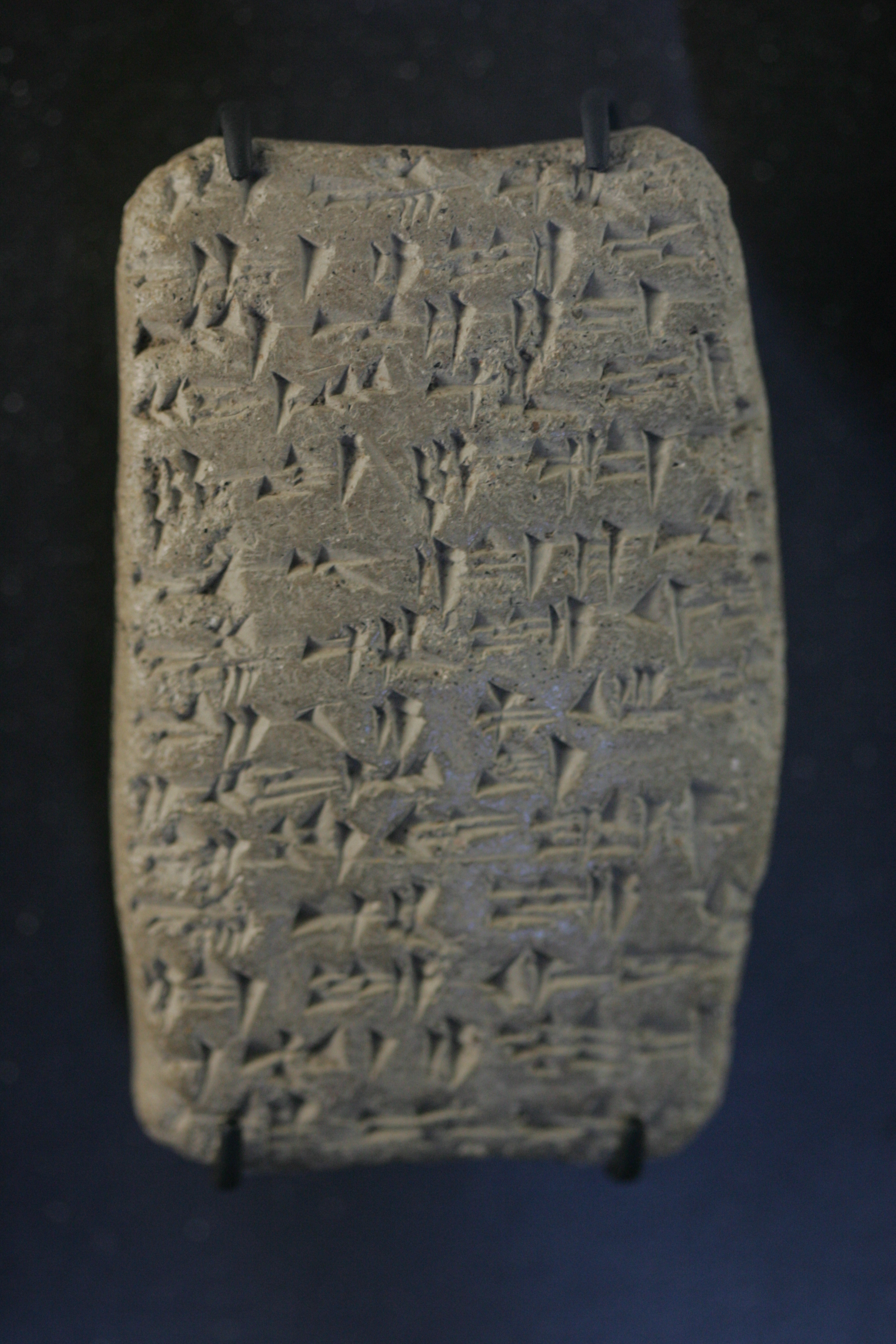
Amarna letter EA 364-(Obverse), by Ayyab to Pharaoh, "Justified War"; (Last line, 1st 2-cuneiform characters: a-di,, reads left-to-right, (slightly out-of-focus on image edge)). (Very high resolution expandable photo.)

The cuneiform di sign, also de, ṭe, ṭi, and sumerograms DI and SÁ is a common-use sign of the Epic of Gilgamesh, the 1350 BC Amarna letters, and other cuneiform texts. In the Akkadian language for forming words, it can be used syllabically for: de, di, ṭe, and ṭi; also alphabetically for letters d, ṭ, e, or i. (All the four vowels in Akkadian are interchangeable for forming words (a, e, i, u), thus the many choices of scribes is apparent for composing actual 'dictionary-entry' words.) Some consonant-pairs (d/t), are also interchangeable (for example the d, t, and ṭ).

== Epic of Gilgamesh usage ==
The usage numbers for di/de in the Epic of Gilgamesh are as follows: de-(8) times, di-(161), ṭe-(7), ṭi-(19), DI-(1), SÁ-(2) times.

Besides ša usage in word components of verbs, nouns, etc., it has a major usage between words. In Akkadian, for English language "who", it is an interrogative pronoun; in the Akkadian language as ša, (as "that", "what"; ("that (of)", "which (of)"), in English it used for who, what, which, etc..

== Ša, and Ka, the stroke differences ==
The difference in the construction of the signs ka and ša are as follows: "ka" when scribed in the Amarna letters often shows the distinctiveness of the right section of the sign, versus the left section. For ša, the right section is constructed with two wedge strokes (one scribed above the other), between the two verticals, at right. For ka, the right side mostly, in the Amarna letters has two verticals, with two horizontals that cross both of them; (the right side is like a two-step ladder shape—(for Hittite ka:—)). A good example of ša, is shown for EA 365, Reverse (top half), where the 2-wedge strokes of ša between the 2-right verticals is clear. (Note, the ša of EA 365 appears to have 3-horizontals at left (differing lengths), then the 2-verticals with the 2-wedge strokes, at right.)

== Ša usage numbers ==
=== Epic of Gilgamesh ===
The usage numbers for ša in the Epic of Gilgamesh are as follows: ša-(66) times. There are no other sub-uses or sumerogramic uses for ša in the Epic of Gilgamesh.

=== Amarna letters ===
Cuneiform ša is common in the Amarna letters, found easily between words (as the pronoun), and especially in word constructs. Since it is similar in appearance to cuneiform ka, the large difference is that ka can easily be found as a suffix to words, for example in the Canaanite sub-corpus of letters as "Servant-Yours",, (ARAD-ka).
