= An (cuneiform) =

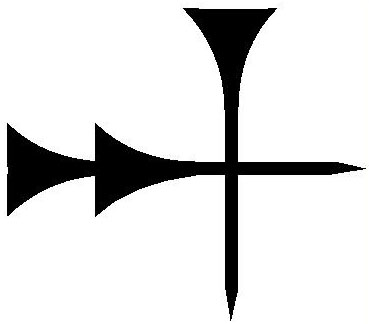
Digitized cuneiform sign for an

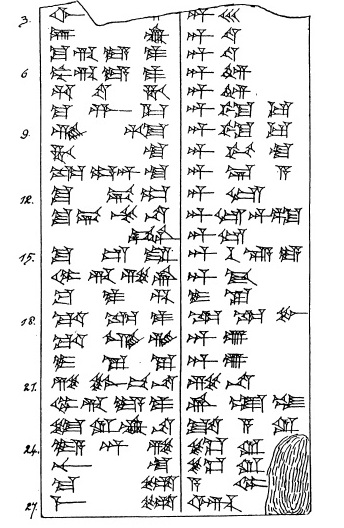
Line drawing of Kassite vocabulary list. The first two gods in column 2, God Sin, and God Shamash; (Shamash again as God #3). Gods #4/5 (identical), are the "Wind Gods", Adad, and Rammânu.

The cuneiform an sign (or sumerogram AN, in Akkadian consisting of ASH 𒀸 and MAŠ 𒈦), is a common, multi-use sign, a syllabic for an, and an alphabetic sign used for a, or n; it is common in both the Epic of Gilgamesh over hundreds of years, and the 1350 BC Amarna letters, and other cuneiform texts. It is also used for the designation of a "god", and is sometimes represented as a superscript: ^{d}, or capitalized: ^{D}, for "dingir", English language, "god". The example photo at right shows (2nd list), a list of 14 named gods, all with "an"; the first pair on the list AN-UTU, or ^{D}UTU, refers to the "sun-god", using Ud (cuneiform), as the sumerogram, namely UTU (sun Sumerogram).

Cuneiform an can also be found in compound form with another cuneiform sign, an example being DAGAL,. The older version of DAGAL used the 'god symbol' as a star within the sign:; (older version of DAGAL, incorporating "star":).

== Epic of Gilgamesh usage ==
In the Epic of Gilgamesh, Tablets I-XII, "an" is used for the following meanings by the following numbers: an-(120) times, ìl-(0) times, ^{d}-(593), AN-(27), and DINGIR-(76) times.

== List of Babylonian gods, etc. ==
From Budge's revised book on Babylonian Life and History, a list of many of the major gods from Babylonian history (and Sumerian):

- Anu, or Anum
- Bêl (An Be),
  - or Enlil (An En lil), -?
- Ea (An É a),
- The "Moon-God":
  - Sin (An-Sin), An

  - Enzu (An En-zu)

  - Nannaru (An LUGAL Ki)
- Shamash (An UTU)
- The "Wind-God": (see Photo-caption, above)
  - Adad
  - Rammânu
- The "Great God-of-Babylon":
  - Marduk or
  - Bêl-Marduk
- Nabû (Nebo) (An ?, or An "pa"), -?, or

- Ninurta (Enurta)
- Nergal
- Gibil
- Nusku (An Nus?-ku),
- Irra
- Ashshur
- Tiamat
- Apsu (Abzu)
- Lakhmu
- Lakhamu
- Anshar
- Kishar
- Mummu (An Mu-um-mu), ---
- Kingu
- Ishtar
- Ninlil (An Nin Lil)
- Damkina (An Dam Ki na), -Dam-

=== List of gods and associated temples, towns, etc. ===
- Anu, or Anum, the E-anna in Uruk
- Bêl (An Be)
  - or Enlil (An En lil), E-kur in Nippur
- Ea (An É a), E-apsu in Eridu; Ibex
- The "Moon-God":
  - Sin (An-Sin), E-gishshirgal in Ur, E-khulkhul in Harran
  - Enzu (An En-zu)
  - Nannaru (An LUGAL Ki)

- Shamash (An UTU)
- The "Wind-God":
  - Adad
  - Rammânu
- The "Great God-of-Babylon":
  - Marduk (E-sagila in Babylon, w/"serpent-gryphon", No. "Ten", Jupiter), or,
  - Bêl-Marduk
- Nabû (Nebo) (An ?, or An "pa"), Shrines at Borsippa, and Calah-(Nimrud)
