= GAL (cuneiform) =

Cuneiform sign

Cuneiform GAL, gal, (a following horizontal stroke upon Ma (cuneiform)).

GAL (Borger 2003 nr. 553; U+120F2 𒃲) is the Sumerian cuneiform for "great". Cognate with Arabic: جلّ, romanized: jalla, lit. 'great' (from whence Al-Jalil).

== See also ==
- LÚ.GAL (King, i.e. Man–Great)
- ^{D}EREŠ.KI.GAL
