= Ik (cuneiform) =

Akkandian language glyph

Cuneiform ik and iq; also ek, and IG, as more common forms.

The cuneiform sign ik, (and iq), is a common-use sign of the Amarna letters, the Epic of Gilgamesh, and other cuneiform texts (for example Hittite texts). It has a common secondary use in the Amarna letters for "iq", for the spelling of Akkadian "qabû", for English "to speak", in dialogue to the pharaoh in the letters.

Linguistically, it has the alphabetical usage in texts for k, or q, or g. And a replacement for any of the four vowels, a, e, i, u.

== Epic of Gilgamesh usage ==
The ik sign usage in the Epic of Gilgamesh is as follows: (eg, 2 times, ek, 13, eq, 2, ig, 9, ik, 51, iq, 27, and IG, 8 times).

== Gallery ==
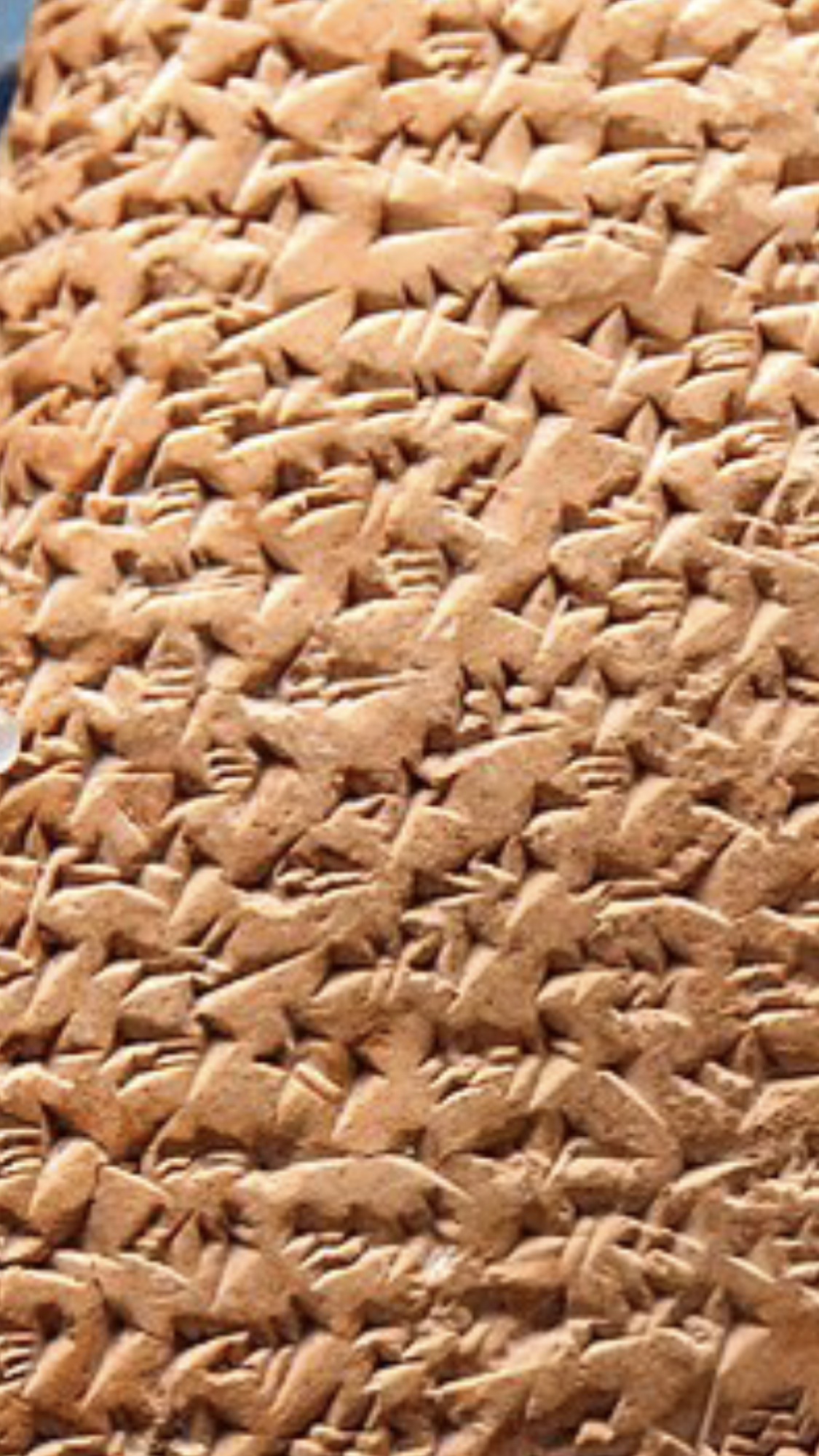
(3rd cuneiform character in first line) qabû, (yi-ik-bi), using iq (cuneiform), line 27 (first full line (in cropped photo), of Amarna letter EA 245, Reverse) qabû = (English, "to say, tell") (Full cuneiform line of EA 245, Reverse, line 27): 27.ù yi-iq-bi a-na ia-a- [ ši ] ___u qabû ana iāši — ___and said to me —

== Bibliography ==
- Parpola, 1971. The Standard Babylonian Epic of Gilgamesh, Parpola, Simo, Neo-Assyrian Text Corpus Project, c 1997, Tablet I thru Tablet XII, Index of Names, Sign List,
