= Ú (cuneiform) =

Cuneiform sign

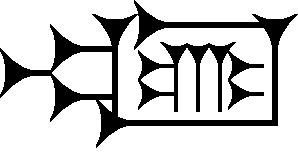
Cuneiform ú-(digital form, inside surrounding cuneiform).

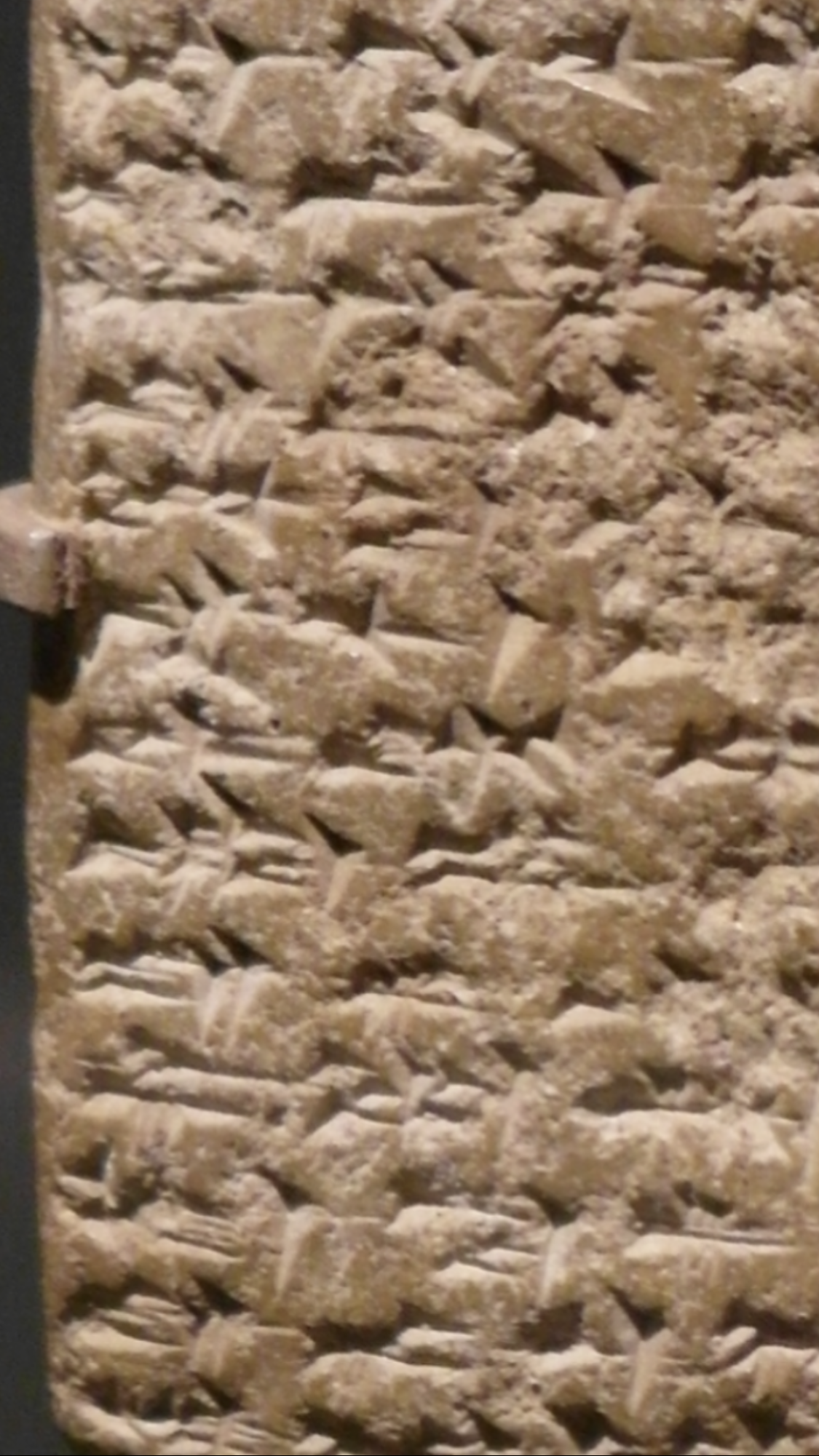
Alphabetic u (ú), third line from botton, last cuneiform character.

The cuneiform sign ú is a common-use sign of the Amarna letters, the Epic of Gilgamesh, and other cuneiform texts (for example Hittite texts). It has a secondary sub-use in the Epic of Gilgamesh for šam.

Linguistically, it has the alphabetical usage in texts for u, but can replace any of the four vowels, so also used for a, or e, or i.

== Epic of Gilgamesh usage ==
The ú sign usage in the Epic of Gilgamesh is as follows: (šam, 45 times, ú, 493, KÚŠ, 2, and Ú, 4 times). Ú is logogram, for Akkadian "tullal", a soapwort.

=== šam syllabic use in the Epic of Gilgamesh ===
The following words use the syllabic šam as the first syllable in the word entries under š in the glossary.

1. šamhatu, for English, "harlot".
2. šamhiš, "proudly, stoutly",.
3. šammmu, "drug, plant, grass".
