= Du (cuneiform) =

Cuneiform sign

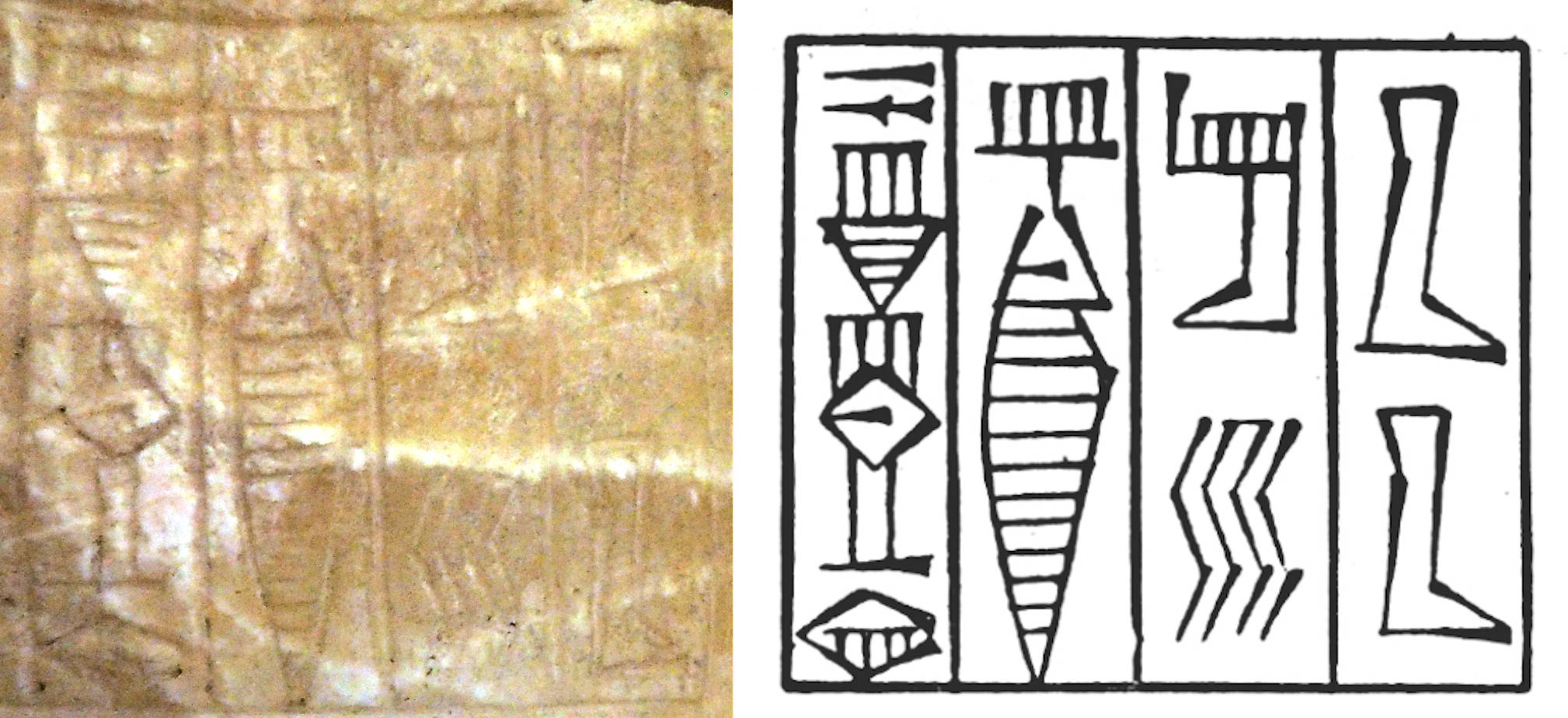
Inscription of the Akkadian king named "Du-Du": "Dudu, Great King of Akkad" (𒁺𒁺 𒁕𒈝 𒈗 𒀀𒂵𒉈𒆠, Du-du da-num lugal a-ga-de3(ki)) on the Dudu alabaster vase. Louvre Museum

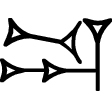
A common form of du, kup, or sumerograms DU, or GUB.

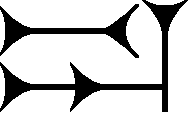
Digitized form of du.

The cuneiform du sign, also kup, and sumerograms DU and GUB, is a common-use sign of the Epic of Gilgamesh, the 1350 BC Amarna letters, and other cuneiform texts. In the Akkadian language for forming words, it can be used syllabically for: du, or kup (and ku, up); also alphabetically for letters d, u, k, or p. (All the four vowels in Akkadian are interchangeable for forming words (a, e, i, u), thus the many choices of scribes is apparent for composing actual 'dictionary-entry' words.) It is also true in the Akkadian language, that some consonants are paired (k/g, k/q), thus the relationship between kup, and sumerogram GUB is explained (k/G).

For the sumerogram GUB, GUB in the Akkadian language becomes uzuzzu, English language for "to stand", or "to be present"; in the Epic of Gilgamesh, GUB is only used (2)-times for uzuzzu, and is used elsewhere in the Tablets I-XII (chapters), (15)-times.

== Epic of Gilgamesh usage ==
The usage numbers for du in the Epic of Gilgamesh are as follows: du-(148) times, kup-(1), and DU-(17) times.
