= Ki (cuneiform) =

Cuneiform sign

Amarna letters form of ki

Cuneiform KI (Borger 2003 nr. 737; U+121A0 𒆠) is the sign for "earth". It is also read as GI_{5}, GUNNI (=KI.NE) "hearth", KARAŠ (=KI.KAL.BAD) "encampment, army", KISLAḪ (=KI.UD) "threshing floor", and SUR_{7} (=KI.GAG). In Akkadian orthography, it functions as a determiner for toponyms and has the syllabic values gi, ge, qi, and qe. Besides its phonetic value it also serves as determiner or "Sumerogram" marking placenames.

As a determiner, KI corresponds to Akkadian itti,

Cuneiform ki is used for syllabic "ki", and also for alphabetic "k", and alphabetic i. It has additional consonant usage for "q", instead of "k", and also "e", "é", and "í" for vowel "i". Its usage numbers from the Epic of Gilgamesh are as follows: ke-(9), ki-(291), qé-(18), qí-(62), and KI-(288).
