= Ta (cuneiform) =

Cuneiform sign

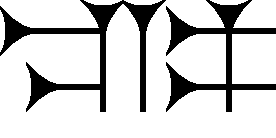
Approximate "digital form" of cuneiform ta. (Identified easily by the 2-verticals, center-left.)

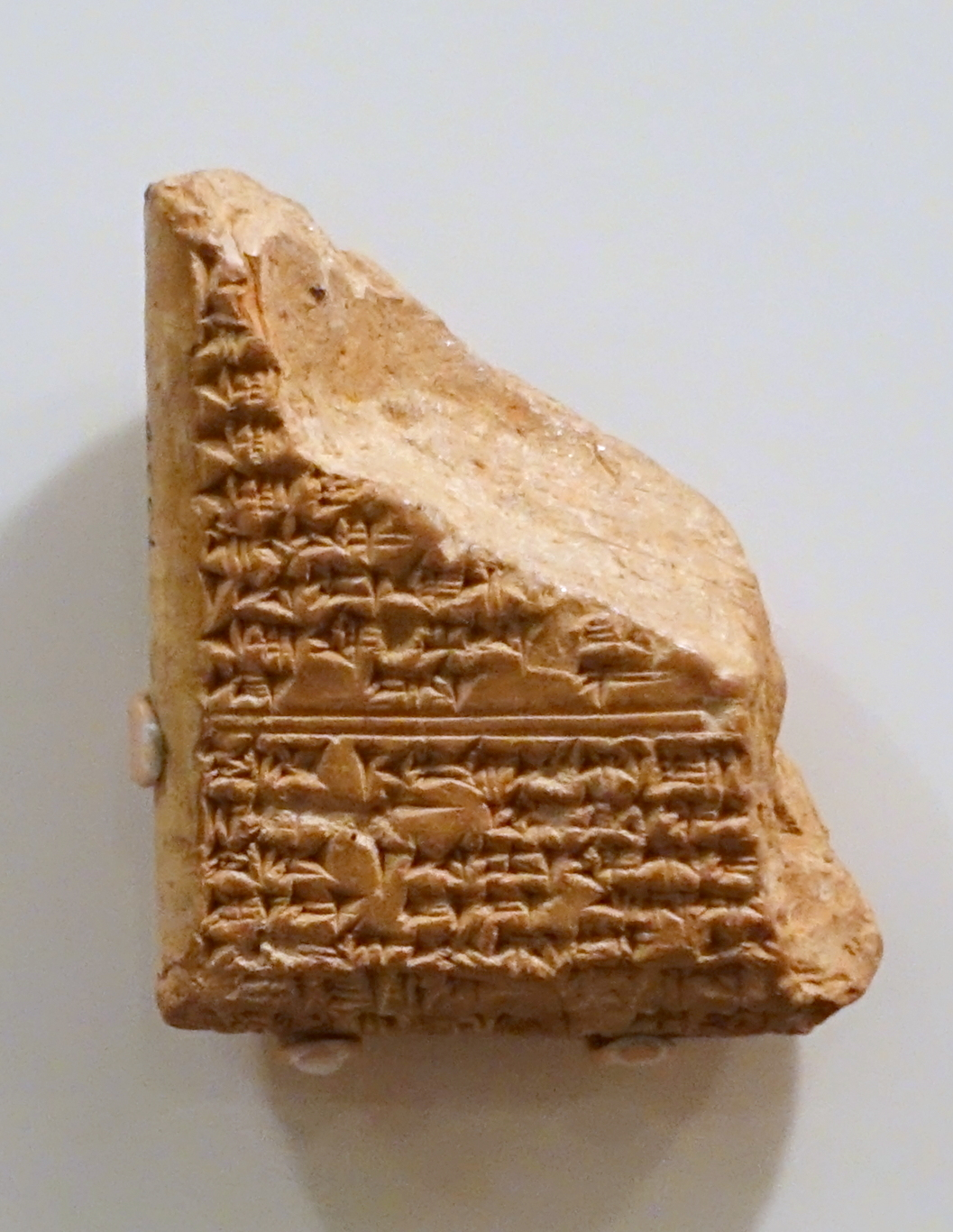
EA 26, fragment (Obverse). (high-resolution expandable photo) (Last flat-surface 5-lines on fragment (Para IV), lines 30–34.

The cuneiform ta sign is a common, multi-use sign of the Epic of Gilgamesh, the 1350 BC Amarna letters, and other cuneiform texts. It also has a sumerogrammic usage for TA, for example in the Epic of Gilgamesh, for Akkadian language "ultu", English language for from, or since, but in only (1) location in the 12 tablet Epic of Gilgamesh. Sumerogram TA is used elsewhere in the Epic, (7) more times.

In the formation of words in text, ta can be a syllabic for "ta", or as a syllabic for t, or a. (It could also be used as a substitute for the other "t", "ṭ".)

== Amarna letters ==
As an example of its usage in the Amarna letters, the photo shows a fragment from the front (obverse) of Amarna letter EA 26. The photo shows the lower-left corner of the clay tablet letter, but what is of interest is the isolated cuneiform characters next to the "double-scribed paragraph lines". The characters before the paragraph lines show the last line of Para III (an VIII paragraph letter). The (3) characters shown are "la ta-pa-[ ]". The adjoining piece has the rest of the spelling of the words, making the line: "lā parāšu", for Not Ceasing, or "Not Interrupting". In English, parāsu means to separate, to cut, or to decide. The la is Akkadian "lā", for English "not". But the reason the verb is spelled across the entire line (EA 26, line 29), is that the subject of Para III concerns the history of "diplomatic missions" coming and going, between Tushratta's Mittani, and the Pharaoh's Egypt. The last line culminates the paragraph, by saying: ...." (the missions), (l. 29) Not, Ceasing! (not being interrupted as commonplace, previously) The verb form is a type of stressing, a form of a superlative; a similar last-line occurs in EA 19, Para II.
