= Amarna letter EA 34 =

14th-century BCE Egyptian clay tablet

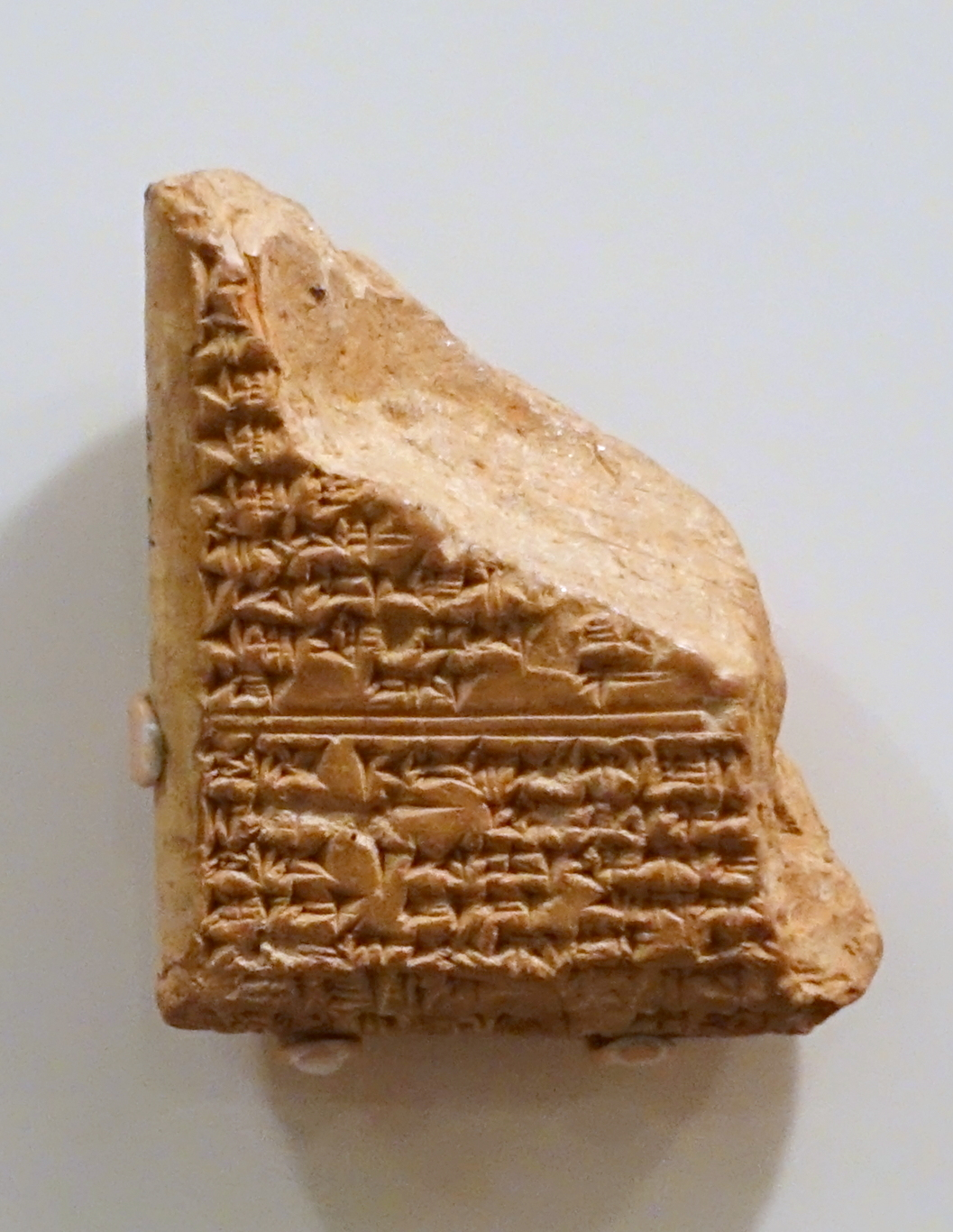
Amarna letter EA 26, fragment (Obverse). (Similar in color to EA 34.) (high-resolution expandable photo)

Amarna letter EA 34, titled: "The Pharaoh's Reproach Answered", is a moderately tall clay tablet Amarna letter from the King of Alashiya. ((Obverse)-See here: )

Besides a complicated story line to EA 34, the letter is shown to be in Very Good condition. It is a bright color, and the cuneiform is finely inscribed. The scribe has some distinct techniques: clarity of the cuneiform; because of a listing, use of non-common cuneiform; a technique with "7 and 7 times" that is non-standard; and some specific signs that are also artful (i.e. the simple multiple use of "tug2" (túg)), which is used for types of clothing.

Besides the interesting use of two verticals for ka4, see as: ( ), "tug2" (túg)) is distinctive, in the Gift Listing, because in a grouping of more uncommon-use cuneiform, "tug2" is dramatically simple. It is similar to this, when the added second horizontal up-stroke is added (like an open "pair of scissors"). "Tug2" (túg) is found on the Obverse, lines: 22, 23, and 25; six times. It is found once on the tablet Reverse, line 47.

EA 34 is numbered 29789 in the British Museum.

The Amarna letters, about 300, numbered up to EA 382, are a mid 14th century BC, about 1360 BC and 20–30 years later, correspondence. The initial corpus of letters were found at Akhenaten's city Akhetaten, in the floor of the Bureau of Correspondence of Pharaoh; others were later found, adding to the body of letters.

== Cuneiform and Akkadian text, EA 34 ==
Obverse (See here: )

Paragraph Ia

(Line 1)—Um-ma lugal kur A-La-ši-ia–.–(..Message (of)King Land Alashiya (ALaShia) )
(2)—a-na lugal kur Mi-iș-Ri (Egypt) ŠEŠ-ia-ma–.–( to (the)King Land Miṣri(Egypt) (Mi-iṣ-Ri), -//- Brother-mine ! )

Paragraph Ib

(3)—Li-ma-ad i-nu-ma šal-ma-ku ù–.–( Know (that)Now ("at this time") --///-- Peace -/- ..And )
(4)—ša-lim kur-ia ù iš-tu "1/2 7." mu-ka4–.–( peace Land-mine --//-- And From "7 & 7 times"( 1/2 7.) --//-- I bow ! (I address you) )
(5)—ù šu-lum-ka4 šu-lum É-kat dumu-meš-ka4–.–( .. and Peace --//-- Peaceful: House; Son(s)-yours; .. )
(6)—DAM-meš ANŠE-kur-ra-meš geš-GIGIR-ka4-meš–.–.–.–(.. Wive(s); Horse(s)(cavalry); Chariot(s)-yours )
(7)—kur-ki-ka4 ma-gal lu-ú šal-mu a-mur at-ŠEŠ-ia–.–(..All lands-yours, Great --/-- May (there) be Peace "To See" .. Brother-Mine ! )

(Note here Para Ib: ka is not used for "yours"— "sons–yours; chariots–yours; land–yours." Instead qa (ka4) is used. In this letter EA 34 "ka4" is more like 2 vertical strokes:. Syllabic "ka" is not used until line 10, and "qa" until lines 12, & 17, Obverse. )

Paragraph II

(8)—I-nu-ma ! ta-aš-tap-ra a-na ia-ā-ši–.–.–(Now sent for Me .. )
(9)—a-na mi-nim-mi --//-- la-a tu-pe-ši RA–.–.–( for "everyone" "daily" --//-- Never(Not) "Wavering" (to part, hold-back) .. RA ! .. )
(10)—Lu2-DUMU-ši-ip-ri-ka a-na mah-ri-ia–(.. Messenger-(Yours) for Counterpart-mine(-Ours) (my Equal) ! )
(11)—ša-ni-ud -/- ù la-ā iš-mi --///-- i-nu-ma–.–( .. Worthy(Illustrious) --//-- And Not Obey("Listen to") --////-- .. Now ..)
(12)—ti-na-ku // ni-qa-am(?ir-nim-am?) -//- ù la-ā ti-ša-?kah2?–(.. Powerful, / "Roaring" --//-- ..And Never(Not) "Having guile"(Doing evil) .. )
(13)—mi-ma i-na lib3-bi-ka4 -//- ù 1.(diš)-šu- ú–.–(..Anyone "in Heart-Theirs" --//-- ..And 1.(The Pharaoh's) (Speech)-(šāru)-"Callings"(Voice) ..)
(14)—šemû --///-- ù anuma utu-XX-"^{d}IM"–.–(.. Obeyed(Listened-to) ---////--- And Now The Sun(Pharaoh) (is) "as-like" Baal ! ..)
(15)—Lu2-DUMU-ši-ip-ri-ia a-na mah-ri-ka4–(.. Messenger-Ours for Counterpart-our (my Equal) ! )

Note for Paragraph II

It can be seen that lines 10 and 15 are identical. Lines 8 - 15 is a treatise on the role of the pharaoh in society; the scribe is in the employ of the mayor/governor of towns, regions, and city-states. So the ideas (a treatise on the Role of Pharaoh), put forward in a clay tablet letter are either the scribe's, or the governor's, or a combination of both people; or even a small group of people consorting upon the topic of the letter.
The King of Alashiya is not a typical Governor. The kingdom of Alashiya is seafaring, thus probably more independent, and with a shipping mercantile has advantages over city-states that are land-locked. Also, Alashiya has access to forested land, besides its marine (ocean) industries.

=== Akkadian ===
Obverse (See here: )

Paragraph Ia

(Line 1)—Umma lugal kur ALaShia (Alashiya))
(2)—ana lugal kur MișRi ŠEŠ-ia-ma !

Paragraph Ib

(3)—Lamādu inuma šal-ām-u ù
(4)—šalāmu kur-ia ù ištu "1/2 7." "maqātu ! "
(5)—ù šu-lum-ka4 (šalāmu) šu-lum(šalāmu) É-kat dumu-meš-ka4
(6)—DAM-meš ANŠE-kur-ra-meš geš-GIGIR-ka4-meš
(7)—kur-ki-ka4 ma-gal lu-ú šal-mu a-mur at-ŠEŠ-ia !

(Note here Para II: ka is not used for "yours"— "sons, yours; chariots, yours; land, yours." Instead qa (ka4) is used. In this letter EA 34 "ka4" is more like 2 vertical strokes:. Syllabic "ka" is not used until line 10, and "qa" until lines 12, 17 Obverse. )

Paragraph II

(8)—Inuma ! šapāru ana iāši ..
(9)—ana mi-nim-mi --//-- lā bêšu RA ! ..
(10)—Lu2-DUMU-ši-ipri-ka ana mah-ri-ia !
(11)—šanu' 'udu ù lā šemû --//-- .. inuma
(12)—ti-na-ku // raMĀmu ù lā ti-ša-?kah2?
(13)—mimma ina lib3bu-ka4 ù 1.(diš)--šāru
(14)—šemû ù anuma utu-XX-"^{d}IM"
(15)—Lu2-DUMU-ši-ipri-ia ana mah-ri-ka4 !

Note for Paragraph II

It can be seen that lines 10 and 15 are identical. Lines 8 - 15 is a treatise on the role of the pharaoh in society; the scribe is in the employ of the mayor/governor of towns, regions, and city-states. So the ideas (a treatise on the Role of Pharaoh), put forward in a clay tablet letter are either the scribe's, or the governor's, or a combination of both people; or even a small group of people consorting upon the topic of the letter.
The King of Alashiya is not a typical Governor. The kingdom of Alashiya is seafaring, thus probably more independent, and with a shipping mercantile has advantages over city-states that are land-locked. Also, Alashiya has access to forested land, besides its marine (ocean) industries.

== Introduction to Pharaoh & Treatise to RÁ (the Pharaoh) ==
Cuneiform score (per CDLI, Chicago Digital Library Initiative), and Akkadian, and English.

Introduction and Treatise

Introduction to Pharaoh (Para Ia)
(lines 1-7)

1.um-ma _Šarru kur_ A-la-ši-ia
___Umma, – Šarru Land Alashiya
___Message, – King, Land Alashiya
2.a-na _Šarru kur_ Mi-iṣ-ri, ŠEŠ-ia-ma (CDLI-(not a-hi-ia-ma))
___ana Šarru Land Mi-iṣ-ri(Miṣri), – ŠEŠ-ia-ma
___To King, Land Egypt(Miṣri), – Brother(compatriot)-Mine
3.li-ma-ad i-nu-ma šal-ma-ku ù
___idû(lamādu) inūma, – šalāmu, – u
___Know now, – "I-have-peace", – and
4.ša-lim kur-ia
___šalāmu mātu-ia
___peace land-mine
4.4--------ù iš-tu (~~šul~~)šú 7(diš) mu-qut? (ka4=qa)?
___----------u ištu (1/2 7)-(diš)(7 & 7), maqātu — !
___----------and from (1/2 7)(7 & 7 times), I bow — !
5.ù šu-lum-(ka_{4} šu-lum--_É_-(ka_{4} dumu-meš-(ka_{4}
___u šalãmu-(ka_{4}, šalãmu-_É_-(ka_{4}, dumu-meš-(ka_{4}
___ And Prosperity(Peace)-Yours, Prosperity household-Yours, sons(pl.)—Yours
6. _dam-meš anše-kur-ra-meš ^{geš}gigir_ ka_{4} _meš_
___ dam-meš, anše-kur-ra-meš, ^{geš}gigir_ ka_{4} _meš_
___ wives(pl.), (stable)-horses(pl.), chariot-(forces)- Yours (pl.)
7. _kur^{ki}_-(ka_{4}
____kur^{ki}_-(ka_{4}
___ (country-Land)-Yours((ka_{4}))
7.2--------ma-gal lu-ú šal-mu a-mur at-<ta> ŠEŠ-ia
___----------ma-gal lu-ú šalãmu amāru at-<ta> ŠEŠ-ia — !
___---------- Greatly “may-there-be” peace “to be seen”, Brother(Compatriot)-Mine — !

(segue to Para 1b)

Treatise on RÁ as Sun-god Pharaoh (Para Ib)
(lines 8-15)

8.I-nu-ma ta-aš-tap-ra a-na ia-a-ši
___Inūma šapāru ana iāši
___Now sent for me
9.a-na mi-nim-mi la-a tu-pe(wu)-ši RÁ
___ana ?mi-nim-mi? lā tu-pe-ši, — RA
___for ?mi-nim-mi?(Everybody(mimmû)), not wavering, — RÁ
10. _Lú-dumu_-ši-ip-ri-ka a-na mah-ri-ia
___Lú-DUMU-ši-ip-ri-ka, – ana mihru-ia — !
___Messenger-Yours, – for Counterpart-Mine — !
((Note: ~(identical) lines 10 and 15 anchor the treatise.))
11.ša-ni-ud ù la-a iš-mi
___ šanu ′′ udu – u lā šemû — !
___ (illustrious, praised–Sun-god-King), – and not listen — !
11.7--------I-nu-ma
___----------Inūma
___----------Now
12.ti-na-ku ni-qa--am ù la-a ti-ša^{#}-kán^{#}
___dannu-ku, – ni-qa(=KA, =pû="voice, utterances")-am u lā šakānu
___powerful-Yours, – roarings(ramāmu, in other Amarna letters), and not emplace
13.mi-ma i-na lib3-bi-ka4 ù aš-šu-ú
___mimmu ina lib3-bi-ka4-
___anything in Heart-Yours
13.6--------ú aš-šu-ú
___------------u aššu
___------------and because
14.eš_{15}-ma-am
___šemû, —
___(you/we) Hear(listen), —
14.3--------ù a-nu-ma utu-XX-"^{d}IM"
___------------u anūma utu-XX-"^{d}IM", — !
___------------And Now (the Sun-god)(Pharaoh) is (as like) Baal, — !
15. _Lú-dumu_-ši-ip-ri-ia a-na mah-ri-ka_{4}
___Lú-DUMU-ši-ip-ri-ia, – ana mihru-ka_{4}
___Messenger-Mine, – for Counterpart-Yours — !
((Note: ~(identical) lines 10 and 15 anchor the treatise.))

(segue to Paragraph II, Gifts from the Pharaoh)

== 100 talents of copper, for a list of Pharaonic gifts ==
Cuneiform score (per CDLI, Chicago Digital Library Initiative), and Akkadian, and English.

For 100 talents of copper sent by the Man (King/Governor) of Alashiya, (EA 34, Obverse, line 18), a long list of items are requested from the Egyptian Pharaoh (King) (line 20, following to break in clay tablet).

(segue to Paragraph II, Gifts from the Pharaoh)

Gifts from the Pharaoh (Para II)

segue
16.ù al-lu-ú ut-ta-šir_{9}-ka
___u elû ut-ta-šir_{9}-yours
___And(therefor), the pinnacle (as) Sun-god RA, as like Baal-(Yours)
17.i-na qa--ti _lú-dumu_ ši-ip-<ri>-ia a-na ka-ta_{5}
___ina qātu _lú-dumu_ ši-ip-<ri>-ia
___in (the) hand (of) messenger-Mine, — ((^{lú}dumu ši-ip-<ri>-(Mine) ))
18.diš-me _gun uruda-meš_
___^{diš=1}me _gun uruda-meš_
___^{diš=1}One Hundred talents of copper^{pl.}
18.5----------Ša-ni-tam ù a-nu-ma
___-------------Šanitam, – u enūma, —
___-------------Furthermore, – and now, —
19.ú-nu-ti- _meš_ yu-ba-al ^{lú}dumu ši-ip-ri-ka_{4}
___anūtu//unūtu- _meš_ abālu ^{lú}dumu ši-ip-ri-ka_{4}
___"Heavenly-utensils^{meš}, — Send messenger-Yours (^{lú}dumu ši-ip-ri-ka_{4})
20.1=diš-en _geš_ ir-šu _^{geš}esi kù-sig_{17}_ šu-[ u ]-a
___^{1=diš}en _geš_, – _^{geš}esi kù-sig_{17}_ šu-[ u ]-a
___((with)) ^{1=diš}one ebony bed^{giš}, – ^{geš}gold-trimmed
21.ù _^{geš}gigir_-tu_{4} šu-hi-tu i-na kù-sig_{17}
___u _^{geš}gigir_-tu_{4} šukītu, – ina kù-sig_{17}
___and (one) (type-of)^{geš}chariot(šukītu), – in gold
22.ù (2 diš)anše-kur-ra ù 4u(40) 2 (diš) _túg-meš_ ù
___u ^{2(diš)}anše-kur-ra, – u 4u(40) 2(diš) _túg-meš_, – u
___and 2 horses, – and 42 linen robes, – and
23.5u(50) _gú-túg-meš_ ù (2 (diš)) ku-ši-ti _túg_ ù
___5u(50) _gú-túg-meš_, – ù (2 (diš)) ku-ši-ti, _túg_ – u
___50 linen-shawls^{pl.}, – and (2 (diš)) linen robes, – and
24. 1(u)+4(diš geš-esi-meš ù 1(u)+7(diš _za-gin_ a-ba-na-tu _Ì du_{10}-ga_
___1(u)+4(diš geš-esi-meš u 1(u)+7(diš _za-gin_ a-ba-na-tu _Ì du_{10}-ga_
___10+4(14) geš-esi-meš and 10+7(17) _za-gin_ a-ba-na-tu _Ì du_{10}-ga_
25. [ ù ] iš-tu _túg-šàr_ 4(diš) _túg_ ù 4(diš) _gú-túg_
___ [ u ] ištu _túg-šàr_, — 4(diš) _túg_ ù 4(diš) _gú-túg_
___[ and ] from Linen(túg)-(of the)-King, — 4(diš) _túg_ and 4(diš) _gú-túg_
26. [ ù iš- ] -tu ú-nu-te ša i-ia-nu
___ [ u iš- ] -tu (ištu) únūtu, – ša i-ia-nu — !
___ [ and fr]om "Utensils", – which "there-is-none" — !

== Paragraph III (EA 34, Reverse) ==
Cuneiform score (per CDLI, Chicago Digital Library Initiative), and Akkadian, and English.

44. _Lú-dumu_-ši-ip-ri-ia a-na mah-ri-ka_{4}

== See also ==
- Alashiya
- Amarna letters–phrases and quotations
