= Amarna letter EA 86 =

Clay tablet

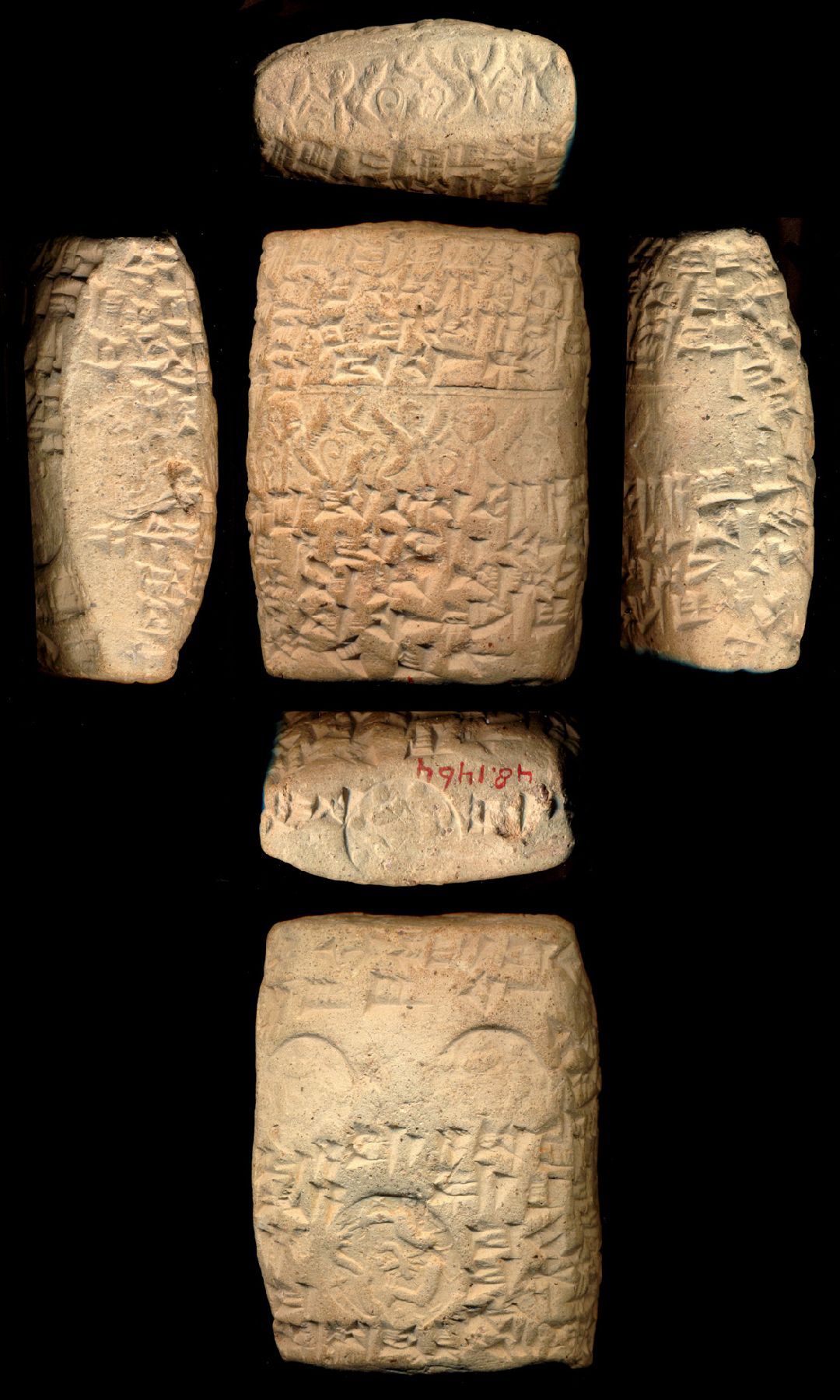
A Cappadocian clay tablet, thick, pillow-shaped, rectangular. (Note: Sealed with a cylinder seal, and multiple impressions from a stamp seal.)

Amarna letter EA 86 (see here ), titled: Complaint to an Official, is a somewhat moderate length clay tablet letter from Rib-Hadda of city-state Byblos (named Gubla in the letter) to Amanappa, an official at the court of the Pharaoh.

The letter has a degraded surface of the clay; it also has missing corners and part of a side. The tablet's obverse fails to yield an easy translation for the last lines of the front and bottom, lines 18-22 (ten percent of the 50-line text). And other lacunae are found throughout the translation.

EA 86 is an extremely ovate, pillow-shaped (thick) clay tablet. It is located in the British Museum, no. 29804.

== EA 86 ==
Moran's non-linear letter English language translation (translated from the French language):

Obverse:

(Lines 1-5)--[Say to] Ama[nappa]: Message of Rib-Had[da]. I fall [at your feet]. May Aman, [the god of the king], your lord, establish yo[ur] honor [in the presence] of the king, your lord-(ŠÀR.RI-EN-ia).
(5)--Listen to m[e!^{1}
(5-12)--The war ]is severe, and so come w[ith] archers-(ERIM.MEŠ-pí-ta-ti) that you may take the land of Amurru. Day and ni[ght it has cri]ed^{2} to you [ and they s]ay (that) what is taken f[rom t]hem to Mittana is very much.
(13-17)--[S]o now you [ yourself ] must not [ say ], 'Why should ... [...] come out?'^{3} You have said [ind] eed, 'Yanhamu sent yo[u] grain.'^{4} Have you not heard? A servant ... [...]
(18-22)-- ...^{5}

Reverse:

(23-30)--[ And be in]form[ed that Um]mah[nu—along with her husband, Milku]ru—the ma[idservant of the Lady] of GUBLA ...] ... [S]o speak to the king [ that ] it may be presented to the Lady.^{6} Do [n]ot hold an[ything] back.
(31-40)--Moreover, speak to [ the king ] so that [grain], the product of the land of Ya[ rmuta ], be given t[o his servant], just as it was [formerly] given to Sumur, so we may keep (i.e. stay) alive until the king g[ives thought] to his city. For 3 years I have been constantly pl[undered] of our grain; there is no[thing] to pay for h[orses].^{7}
(41-50)--Why should the king g[rant] 30 pairs of [horses] and you your[self] take 10 pairs? If you t[ake],^{8} take al[l of them ], but from the land of Y[arimuta ] let grain be given for [ us ] to eat. [ Or ] sen[d ships so I myself ] can get [ out ].--(obverse, and reverse, with lacunae mostly restored, except lines 18-22)

== Akkadian text ==
Text: Akkadian language, sumerograms, Egyptianisms, etc.

Akkadian:

Obverse:
Paragraph I

(Line 1)--[ A-na 1.^{diš}-]- -A-Ma-Na-[-aP-Pa,.. qí-bí-ma!... ]--(--(For/(To) Amanappa,.. ("Say")-"Report"!... )
(2)--umma 1.^{diš}-Ri-iB-^{d}-[-IŠKUR ana GÌR.MEŠ-ka ]--(..Message Rib-Hadda, at FEET(pl)-yours,.. )
(3)--am-qú-ut!... ^{d}A-Ma-uN(a)-(God-Amun),.. [ dingir,.. ša ^{Quote}LUGAL— ]--(I bow!... (May) God Amun,.. (The)-God which (of) ^{Quote}King— )
(4)--—EN—ka,..^{Unquote} ti-di-nu!..^{Unquote} tėš-ka,.. [ ana pa-ni,.. ]--(..—Lord—yours,..^{Unquote} Establish!..(Proclaim!).. Honor-yours,.. "before",.. )
(5)--LUGAL-ri EN-ka!... Ši-mé ia-[-ši!... Nu-KÚR,.. ] --(King-Lord-"You"!... Listen "to me"! (Hear "me")!... (The) War,.. )
(6)--kal-ga!... Ù,.. ka-uš-da qa-[-du ]--(..(is) severe!... And "vanquish-ing" "Hands",.. )
(7)--ERIM.MEŠ-pí-ṭá-ti!.. Ù,.. [ ti-ìl-qé!.. ]--(..(of)_"Archer-Army"(Egyptian pítati)!.. And Take!.. )
(8)--^{KUR}-A-Mu-Ri!..(Amurru)!.. Ur-ra (and) Mu-ša,.. (..^{Land}Amurru!... Day (and) Night,.. )
(9)--[ ... ]-ši,.. ana ka-ta_{5}!.. [ ù ],..(..(it has)-[Call]ed,.. to You!.. [ And,.. ] )
(10)--[ ti-]-iq-ta-bu,.. ma-ad, ma-[-gal,..] ( (they)-"say",.. 'much', "great",.. )
(11)--[ mi-im-]-mu,.. ša yu-ul-qú ìš-tu,..( everything,.. "what" taken from,.. )
(12)--[ ša-]-šu-nu,.. ana ^{KUR}-Mi-Ta-Na!.. [ ù ] (.. "them",.. to ^{Land}-Mitanni!... And,.. )

(1)--(Ana,.. qabû!... )
(2)--(umma 1. Rib-Hadda,.. ana šēpu.meš-ka,.. )
(3)--(maqātu!.. ^{d}-Amun,.. ^{Dingir},.. ša,.. ^{Quote}LUGAL– )
(4)--(–^{EN}Bēlu–ka,..^{Unquote} idû tėš-ka,.. ana pānu,..)
(5)--(LUGAL-ri(ŠÀRru)-^{EN}Bēlu-ka!... Šemû iāši!.. (The) nukurtu,.. )
(6)--(kalu!.. Ù,.. kašādu qa-du,.. )
(7)--(ERIM.MEŠ-pí-ṭá-ti(Archer-Army)!.. Ù leqû,.. )
(8)--(..^{KUR} Amurru!... Urru (and) Mūšu,.. )
(9)--( (it has)-"called",.. ana kâti!.. ù,.. )
(10)--(..qabû,.. mâdu, magal,.. )
(11)--(mimmu,.. ša leqû ištu,.. )
(12)--(..šâšu,.. ana ^{KUR}-Mittani!.. [ ù,.. ] )

segue:
(13)--A-nu-ma i-na-na,.. la-a ta-[-aq-bu,..(.. (So) when "now",.. "not" Say,.. )
(14)--[ ù ],.. a-]-mi-ni tu-]-ṣa-na [ ... ]--(.. [ And ],.. Why should [come out]?.. )
(15)--[ ki-a-]-ma táq-bi 1.^{diš}-]-iYa-aN-Ha-[-A-Mi,..--(.."thus" said,.. Yanhamu,.. )
(16)--uš-ši-ir še-im.HI.A ana ka-[-ta_{5} ]--(.."issued"(sent),.. GRAIN.(pl),.. to "you",.. )

segue:
(13)--(..Anūma(Enūma) inanna(eninna),.. lā qabû,.. )
(14)--(..ù,.. ammīni(mīnu) tu-ṣa-na [ xx ],.. )
(15)--(..kíam qâbu,.. 1.-Yanhamu,.. )
(16)--(..uššuru,.. (ŠE.HI.A)Še'u.HI.A(corn, grain)(pl),.. ana kâti,.. )

== See also ==
- Rib-Hadda
- Amarna letters–phrases and quotations
