= Amarna letter EA 325 =

EA 362, from Rib-Haddi, an Amarna letter, approximately 2x larger than EA 325. (very high-resolution expandable photo)

Amarna letter EA 325, titled: "Preparations Completed (2)," is a shorter-length clay tablet Amarna letter from Yidya the governor-'mayor' of Ašqaluna. It is a letter addressing the Pharaoh in high terms, as well as stating the 'governor of Ašqaluna' is making preparations for the arrival of the Pharaoh's archer-army, the archers (Egyptian pitati). EA 325 is a vassal-state letter (from Canaan), and has some similar appearances, for example appearing like letters EA 270 and EA 271.

== The letter ==
=== EA 325: "Preparations Completed (2)," ===
EA 325, letter five of seven, by Yidya. (Not a linear, line-by-line translation, and English from French.)

(Lines 1-9)--[To] the king, my lord, my god, my Sun, the Sun fr[om the s]ky; Message of Yidya, your servant, the dirt at your feet, the groom of [yo]ur horses. I indeed prostrate myself, on the back and on the stomach, at the feet of the king, my lord, 7 times and 7 times.
(10-14)--I am indeed guarding the place of the king, my lord, and the city of the king, my lord, [w]here I am. Who is the dog that would not obey the orders of the king, the Sun from the sky?
(15-19)--I have indeed prepared absolutely everything — [f]ood, strong drink, oxen, sheep, and goats,^{1} grain, straw, absolutely everything that the king, my lord, commanded. I have indeed prepared it.
(20-22)--And I am indeed p[reparing] the tribute of the Sun, in accordance with the comma[nd] of the king, my lord, the Sun fr[om the sky].

== Akkadian text ==
The Akkadian language text:

Akkadian:

(Line 1)--A-na 1.^{diš}-LUGAL-EN-ia ^{dingir}-MEŠ-IA--(–1–: LUGAL-,.. -MEŠ-,..)
(2)--^{dingir}-UTU-IA ^{dingir}-UTU ša iš-tu [ an-ša_{10}-mi ]--(-UTU-,.. -UTU ša -ša_{10}-mi!...)
(3)--umma 1.^{diš}-(pi=yi)-YI-iD-(i)Ya ARAD-ka--(–1,– Yi--,..,...)
(4)--ip-ri ša 2.^{diš}-GÌR-MEŠ-ka--(.. ša 2(1-1).-GÌR-MEŠ-,...)
(5)--LÚ qar-tab-bi ša 2.^{diš} ANŠE.KUR.RA.MEŠ-ka--(.. qar--- ša 2.-ANŠE--RA-MEŠ-,...)
(6)--ana 2.^{diš}-GÌR-MEŠ LUGAL-EN-ia am-qú-ut--( 2.-GÌR-MEŠ,.. LUGAL-,.. -qú-ut!... )
(7)--7.^{diš}-šu ù 7.^{diš}-ta-na--(7.-,.. ú 7,.. -,.. )
(8)--lu-ú iš-tu-hu-hi-in--(lu-ú,.. --hu-hi-in!...)
(9)--ṣi-ru-ma ù ka-ba-tu-ma
segue:
(single line ruling)(=paragraph)
(10)--a-nu-ma i-na-ṣa-ru a-šar
(11)--LUGAL-EN-ia ù URU-^{ki} LUGAL-EN-ia
(12)--ša it-ti-ia mi-la-mi
(13)--lu-ú-ur-gi_{12} ù la-a (pi=yi) yi-iš-te-mu
(14)--a-wa-ti_{7} LUGAL ^{dingir}-UTU iš-tu an- { ša_{10}-mi }
segue:
(single line ruling)(=paragraph)
(15)--a-nu-ma šu-ši-ir-ti gáb-bi mi-im-mi
(16)--[ NÌG-]-MEŠ KAŠ-MEŠ (gu_{4})GUD-MEŠ ud_{5}-MEŠ
(17)--ŠE-MEŠ IN-MEŠ gáb-bi mi-im-[ mi ]

English:

(Line 1)--(To:.. 1.-King-Lord-Mine,.. (of) Gods (pl)-Mine,.. )
(2)--(God-'Sun-God'-Mine,.. God 'Sun-God' 'which' from "Sky" (Heaven),.. )
(3)--('message thus' 1.-Yi-iD-iYa(Yidya),.. Servant-Yours,.. )
(4)--(dust,.. 'which at' 2.-feet (pl)-yours,.. )
(5)--((the) Groom,.. 'which of' 2.-Horses(pl)-Yours,.. )
(6)--(at 2. Feet (pl),.. King-Lord-Mine,.. (I) bow!... )
(7)--(7. times and 7, times,.. )
(8)--("may it be",.. (that I) prostrate (myself),.. )
(9)--((on my) Back and Front (liver),.. )
segue:

== See also ==
- Yidya
- Ashkelon
- Amarna letter EA 323
- Archers (Egyptian pitati)
- Amarna letters–phrases and quotations
