= Amarna letter EA 271 =

Clay tablet letter

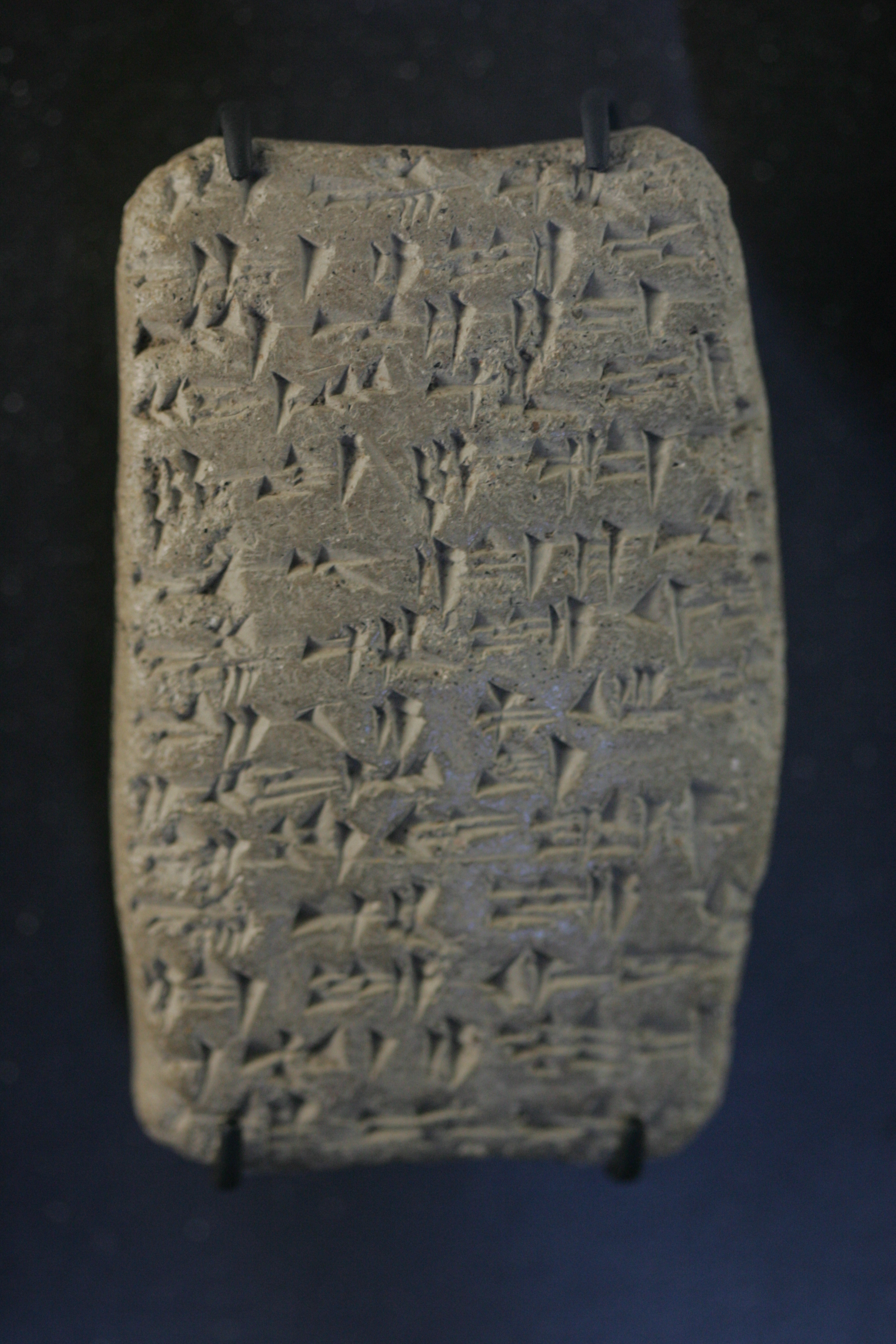
EA 364, from Ayyab, equivalent-sized Amarna letter (dramatically different in style). (very high-resolution expandable photo)

Amarna letter EA 271, titled: "The Power of the 'Apiru," is a moderately short, tallish, rectangular clay tablet letter, approximately 3 in wide x 4 in tall, from Milkilu the mayor/ruler of Gazru (Gezer), of the mid 14th century BC Amarna letters.

The Canaanite city-states were visited by the scribes, with short 'status reports' sent to the Pharaoh (King) reporting on city or regional accounts, for example the troubles with the habiru, or other external affairs. Many of the Canaanite letters are short, with some nearly identical phraseology of words, as well as the layout of the individual clay tablet letters. Milkilu authored EA 268 through EA 271. Amarna letter EA 270-(29 lines) is nearly identical in shape to EA 271-(27 lines), with the beginning lines of the obverse, nearly identical in wording, and spacing.

The Amarna letters, about 300, numbered up to EA 382, are a mid 14th century BC, about 1350 BC and 20–25 years later, correspondence. The initial corpus of letters were found at Akhenaten's city Akhetaten, in the floor of the Bureau of Correspondence of Pharaoh; others were later found, adding to the body of letters.

Letter EA 271 (see here ; or here: -(EA 271)), is numbered VAT 1531, from the Vorderasiatisches Museum Berlin.

== The letter ==
=== EA 271: "The Power of the 'Apiru" ===
EA 271, letter five of five. (Not a linear, line-by-line translation, and English from French.) (Obverse & Reverse):

Obverse See here: ; Line drawing, see here:

(Lines 1–8)--Say to the king, my lord, my god, my Sun: Message of Milkilu, your servant, the dirt at your feet. I fall at the feet of the king, my Lord, 7 times and 7 times.
(9-16)--May the king, my lord, know that the war against me and against Šuwardata is severe. So may the king, my lord, save his land from

Bottom & Reverse See here: ; Line drawing, see here:

the power of the 'Apiru. ( LÚ-meš SA.GAZ.MEŠ )
(17-27)--O[th]erwise, may the king, my lord, send chariots to fetch u[s] lest our servants kill us.
Moreover, may the king, my lord, ask Yanhamu, his servant, about what is bein[g] done in his [l]and.--(complete EA 271, only minor, restored lacunae, lines 1–27)

== Akkadian text ==
The Akkadian language text: (through line 12, obverse)

Akkadian: –

(Line 1)--a-na 1.(diš)-LUGAL EN-ia–.–(To 1. King-Lord-mine...)
(2)--dingir-meš-ia (d)UTU-ia–.–.–((of) gods(pl)-mine, Sun-god-mine)
(3)--qí-bí-ma–.–.–.–.–.–(speak(-ing)!)
(4)--um-ma 1.(diš)-MiL-Ki-Li, ARAD-ka—('message thus' 1. Milkilu, Servant-yours...)
(5)--ep-ri ša GÌR-MEŠ-ka–.–(dirt [which at] feet(pl)-yours)
(6)--a-na GÌR-MEŠ LUGAL EN-ia–.–.–(at feet(pl), King-Lord-mine)
(7)--dingir-meš-ia (d)UTU-ia–.–.–.–((of) gods(pl)-mine, Sun-god-mine)
(8)--7-šu 7-tá-a-an am-qut–.–.–.–(7 times [and] 7 times (again)...--...I bow(-ing)) ! (am bowing)
(9)--yi-de LUGAL be-li–.–.–.–(Know! ...King-Lord)
(10)--i-nu-ma da-na-at–.–.–.–(Now (now, at this time) Severe-)
(11)--nu-kúr-tu UGU-ia–.–.–.–(severe-Warfare "upon"(us) !.. )
(12)--ù UGU 1.(diš) Šu-Wa-Ar-Da-Ta–.–(and upon ^{1.} Šuwardata !)
(13)--ù yi-ki-im
(14)--LUGAL be-li kur-šu
(15)--iš-tu qa-at

Reverse

(16)--lú-meš SA.GAZ.MEŠ
(17)--šum-ma i-a-nu
(18)--yu-uš-ši
(19)--LUGAL be-li GIŠ-GIGIR-meš
(20)--a-na la-qé-nu la-a
(21)--ti_{7}-ma-ha-sú-nu ARAD-šu
(22)--ù ša-ni-tam
(23)--yi-ša-al
(24)--LUGAL be-li [...]
(25)--1.(=diš) iYa-aN-Ha-Ma-(Yanhamu)
(26)--a-na ša yu-pa-šu
(27)--i-na kur-šu

== The Habiru/'Apiru ==

The mention of the Habiru shows the conflict of the time, as the takeover of city-states or regions by the Habiru. The map shows various cities and regions, and their respective dealings with the Habiru. (There are only 3 letters from Labaya of Šakmu/Shechem.) The next closest mention of the Habiru is from the Jerusalem letters of Abdi-Heba, directly south at Jerusalem, letters EA 286, 287, 288, 289, and EA 290.

=== Spellings for Habiru in the Amarna letters ===
- EA 100, l. 26—KUR,.. ša ìl-qú LÚ.MEŠ GAZ,.. [ ištu ]–.]–( LÚ-MEŠ GAZ )
- EA 271, l. 16—..lú-meš Sa-GaZ-meš .. ( Men (pl), SA.GAZ^{MEŠ(pl)}
- EA 290, l. 24—..Ha-Pí-Ri .. ( Hapiru ( 'Apiru ))
- EA 299, l. 18—..da-an-nu LÚ-SA-GAZ-meš .. ( "Strengthening" – LÚ.SA.GAZ.MEŠ ..( "Strengthening Habiru" )
- EA 366, l. 21—.. {LÚ} SA-GAZ .. ( ^{LÚ}SA-GAZ (Habiru))

== See also ==
- Milkilu
- Amarna letter EA 270
- Habiru (the 'Apiru)
- Amarna letters–phrases and quotations
