= Qut =

Cuneiform sign

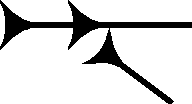
Cuneiform qut; also qud, kut, etc., and Sumerograms SILA and TAR.

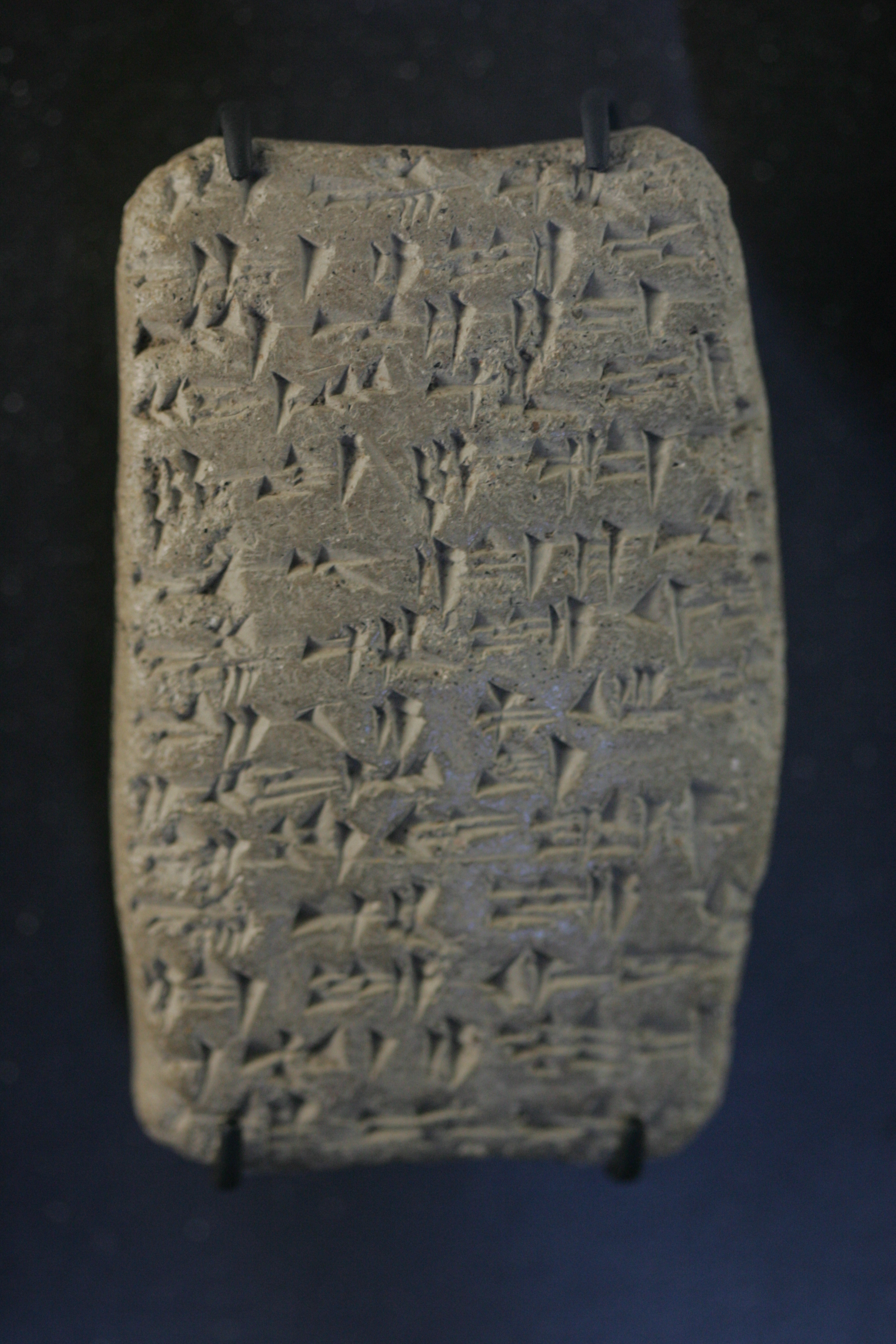
Amarna letter EA 364-(obverse), Ayyab to Pharaoh, "Justified War". In Line 6, 2nd character from left, for am-qut, (Akkadian language, maqātu, "to fall, to happen", I bow down) ; text reads left-to-right. (am-qut). (high resolution, expandible photo)

The cuneiform qut sign, (also qud, aspirated 't', unaspirated 'd') sign is found in both the 14th century BC Amarna letters and the Epic of Gilgamesh. It is a multi-use sign with 9 syllabic/alphabetic uses in the Epic of Gilgamesh; in the Amarna letters it is extremely common in the prostration formula, typical first paragraph of a letter, saying typically: "7 and 7 times, I bow down" (to the Pharaoh, when addressed to the Pharaoh); a small group of Amarna letters are addressed to a different distinct personage in Egypt, under the Pharaoh.

In the Epic of Gilgamesh, the sign is used for many syllabic meanings, as well as two Sumerograms, as follows:

has
haṣ
kut
qud
qut
šel
šil
tar
ṭar
SILA, "street Sumerogram"
TAR, for Goddess Ishtar's name, ^{D}IŠ.TAR

The usage numbers for the sign are as follows in the Epic: has-(2), haṣ-(7), kut-(6), qud-(8), qut-(27), šel-(1), šil-(4), tar-(16), ṭar-(9), SILA-(3), for Akkadian language "sūqu", 'street', TAR-(17), exclusively for Ištar's name.

== Usage, letter EA 364 ==
For Amarna letter EA 364, Ayyab to Pharaoh, located in the Louvre (no. AO 7094), the qut sign is only used once, on the clay tablet obverse, line 6.

The following is Rainey's (1970) English language, mostly sequential line-by-line translation, and sign characters, up to line 11:

(1) "To the king, my lord, (2) thus (speaks) Ayyab, (3) your servant: at (4) the feet of my lord (5) seven times (and) seven times (6) I have fallen down. I am the servant (7) of the king, my lord, ("And" omitted) (8) the dust of (i.e. beneath) (9) his two feet. (10) I have obeyed (lit.: heard) the message (11) of the king, my lord, (12) to me from (13) the hand of ...." (Tahmassi, messenger envoy)

(1) "a-na šarri(LUGAL) bēli(EN)-ia (2) um-ma A-ia-ab (3) arad(ÌR)-ka a-na! (4) šēpē(GÌR-meš) bēli(EN)-ia (5) 7-šu 7-ta-an (6) am-qut a-na-ku arad (ÌR) (7) šarri(LUGAL) bēli(EN)-ia ("and", ù (u, 2nd prime) omitted, a large 2-sign combinatorial, (ši+ku?, see photo)) (8) SAHAR ("dust Sumerogram") /(2nd omitted 1/2 u, "and") a-pa-ru(=eperu, 'dust'(Akkadian)) (9) 2 šēpē(GÌR-meš)-šu (10) eš(sub 15)(=iš)-te-mé ša-par (11) šarri(LUGAL) bēli(EN)-ia (12) a-na ia-ši i-na (13) qa-ti 1. A-tah-ma-ia (Tahmassi) (14) ...."

Lines 7 and 11, have the repetition, "King-Lord-mine" from Line 1 (LUGAL-EN-ia, "Šarri-Bēli-ia" for the Akkadian).

=== Akkadian maqātu, "to fall", "to happen" ===
The phrase: ...7 and 7 times, "I bow (down)".... is extremely prominent in the Amarna letters, and especially from the letters from the Canannite city-states. The Akkadian language word is "maqātu", to fall, to happen, etc., and has various spellings requiring an m, q-(or equivalent (k)), and t. One of the commonest spellings are the two cuneiform signs am-qut.
