= U (cuneiform) =

Cuneiform sign

Cuneiform sign for u, (1st of 3 common u's), and Numeral 10; and also used as a conjunction, Akkadian u, for "and", "but", etc., (an obvious space saver in texts, if needed).

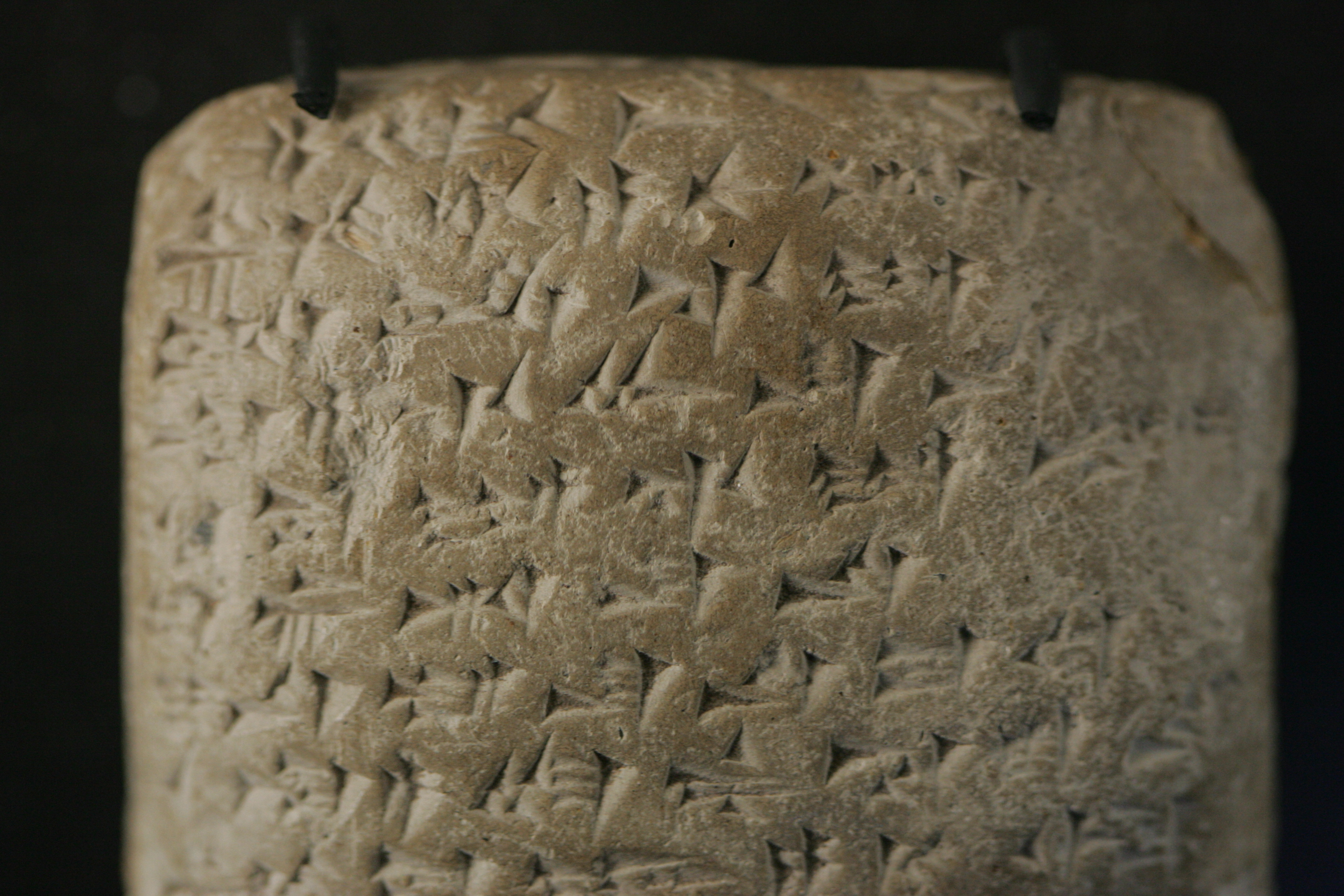
Amarna letter EA 365-(Reverse), Biridiya to Pharaoh, "Furnishing Corvée Workers". Conjunction use of u in first line, a segue: "And see...!", (..."But Look!"). The entire substance of the clay tablet letter follows on (this)-reverse side (one line needed as 'final line' on an edge). (2nd use of conjunction u, and..., at start of line 8 (1st character at left.)) (high resolution, expandible photo)

The cuneiform U sign is found in both the 14th century BC Amarna letters and the Epic of Gilgamesh. It can be used for the alphabetic u, instead of the more common 2nd u, (ú). It has two other uses, commonly. It can be used for the number 10 (especially the Amarna letters from Tushratta of Mitanni, or Burna-Buriash II the king of Babylon), but its probable greater use is for the conjunction, u, with any of the conjunction meanings: and, but, else, etc.

Of the three u's, by graphemic analysis (Buccellati, 1979), the commonness is as follows:

Ù (cuneiform), conjunction only (but also rare, for alphabetic "u")
ú (cuneiform), alphabetic 'u'
u (cuneiform), alphabetic (minor), 10, conjunction (highest use)

Both Ù (cuneiform) and ú are in the top 25 most used signs, but E (cuneiform) and "u (cuneiform)" are not; other vowels (or combination) in the 25 are: a (cuneiform), i (cuneiform), and ia (cuneiform), (which has a secondary use as suffix, "-mine", or "my", thus in top 25 most used signs). Suffix "iYa" is used in the Middle East\Southwest Asia at present day to end placenames, or other names: "My Xxxxx".

== Amarna letters uses ==
The use of u for numeral 10 has been explained above. It is used in the letters from Tushratta, speaking of the ancestral relations with former father kings: ...my father loved your father (the Pharaoh) 10 times more, and I have 10 times more love now. May our relations... be forever "inter-related". (Amarna letter EA 19, 2nd paragraph, setting up the letter of a 13 paragraph letter, topics about daughter for Pharaoh's wife, love, gold, etc.)

Amarna letter EA 252, Labaya to Pharaoh, titled: Sparing One's Enemies, explains his actions in defending 'his position', after cities have been overtaken. He states in idiomatic iconography: "....my parts are eaten!..(.U.)And..I am slandered!. He continues in parable form: ".....if an ant is attacked (pinched), should it just sit (take it), or bite (the) hand back!?".... He continues to then discuss the men who have taken a city, (and a cult statue), and defends his past, and future actions.

== Partial list of signs beginning with wedge (u) ==
Partial list of signs beginning with u, from the Epic of Gilgamesh (Parpola, 1971), and the Amarna letters:

- Cuneiform-u--Sign No. 1----(conjunction use, and "10"; occasionally for u)
- Cuneiform-AMAR, ṣur, zur--Sign No. 2---; Sumerogram: See!-(AMAR) (Akkadian, "amāru")-(Note: minus the vertical stroke)
- Cuneiform-di--Sign No. 3---
- Cuneiform-ki--Sign No. 4---
- Cuneiform-mi-(Sign 5)
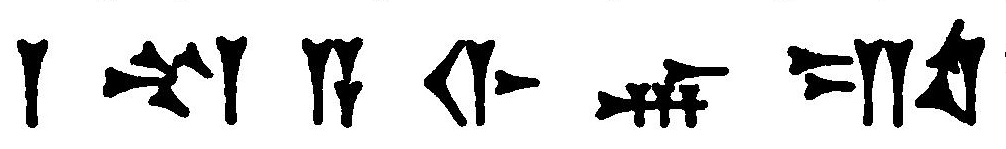
- Cuneiform-ši, lim, or IGI ("in 'face' of", "before" Sumerogram)--Sign No. 6--- --(Abdi-Ashirta), Abdi-A-Ši-iR-Ta, (wedge-sign, 4th sign)
- Cuneiform-u--Sign No. u-1---
- Cuneiform-ú--Sign No. u-2----(approximate: only 3 verticals for ú, (the common alphabetic u))
- Cuneiform-Ù-(u-3)--Sign No. 7---
  - (With an added horizontal,, after the left vertical)

Also:

- Cuneiform-ar, (Shuwardata of Amarna letter EA 282)
- Cuneiform-nim-(nem, nim, num, and Sumerograms NIM, NUM) (EA 34)

== See also ==
- Winkelhaken – one of the five basic wedge elements used in Akkadian cuneiform, identical to u.
