= Mi (cuneiform) =

Cuneiform sign

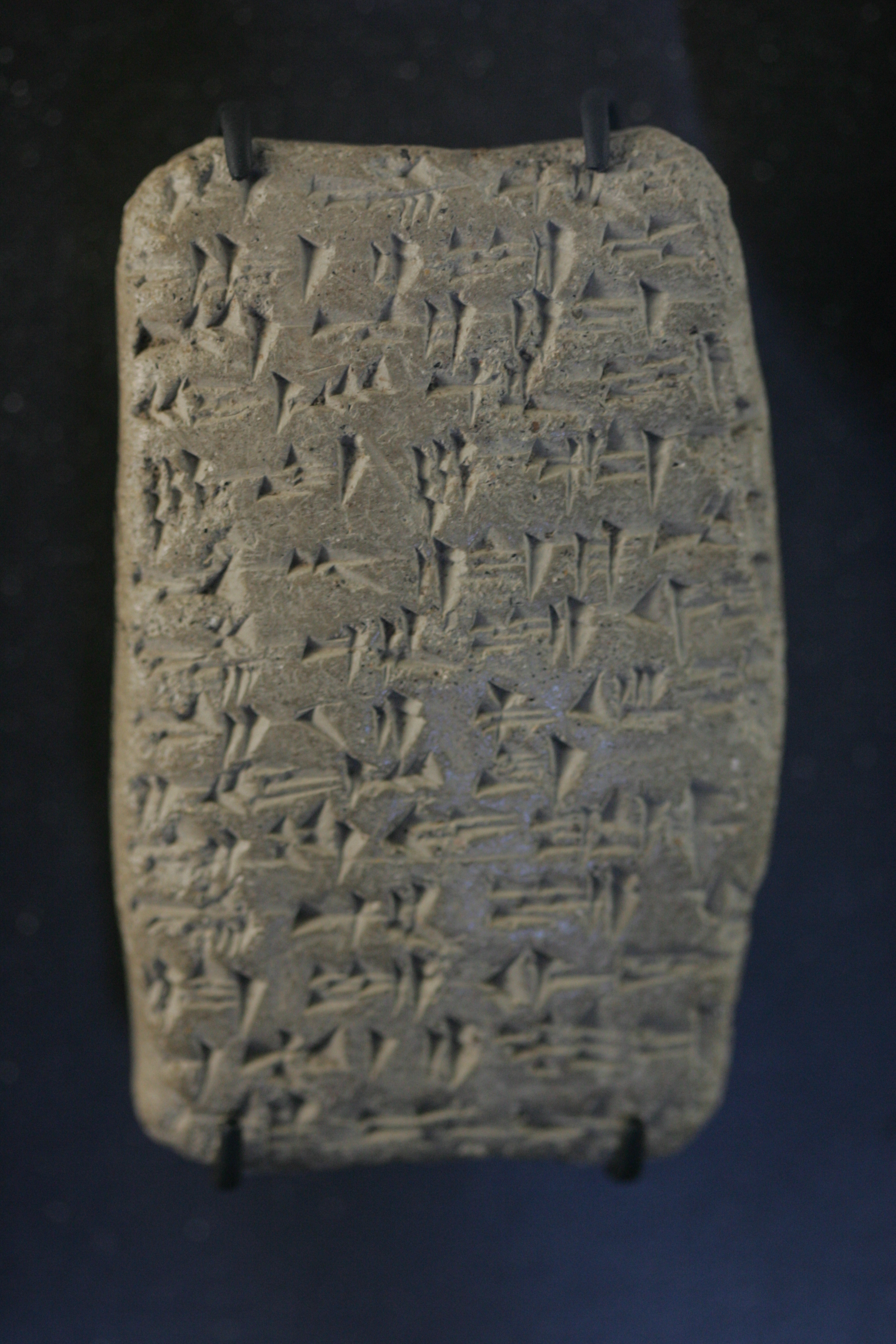
Amarna letter EA 364-(Obverse), Ayyab to Pharaoh, "Justified War". Sign mi, 4th sign, line 10. (high resolution, expandible photo)

The cuneiform mi, (also mé) sign is a distinctive sign in the wedge-stroke group, and is used as a syllabic for mi, me, and an alphabetic for m, i, or e; it is also a Sumerogram (capital letter (majuscule)) for MI, used for Akkadian language, "mūšu", night. MI, in the Epic of Gilgamesh, is used in (Chapters) Tablets I, II, III, and XII as either MI, or MI.MEŠ, a total of six times; other spellings of mūšu in other sections are alphabetic/syllabic, four times.

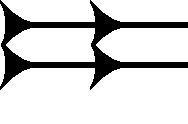
The sign can be found in the Epic of Gilgamesh and the mid-14th century BC Amarna letters. The signs usage in the Epic is as follows: mé-(1 time), mi-(126), MI-(9).

== Partial list of signs beginning with wedge (u) ==
Partial list of signs beginning with (wedge)-u, from the Epic of Gilgamesh (Parpola, 1971), and the Amarna letters:

- Cuneiform-u--Sign No. 1----(conjunction use, and "10"; occasionally for u)
- Cuneiform-AMAR, ṣur, zur--Sign No. 2---; Sumerogram: 'See!-(AMAR) (Akkadian, "amāru")-(Note: minus the vertical stroke)
- Cuneiform-di--Sign No. 3---
- Cuneiform-ki--Sign No. 4---
- Cuneiform-mi--Sign No. 5---
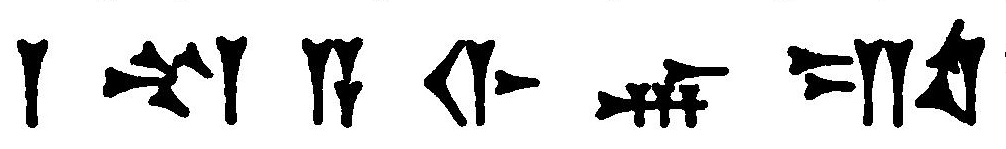
- Cuneiform-ši, lim, or IGI ("in 'face' of", "before" Sumerogram)--Sign No. 6--- --(Abdi-Ashirta), Abdi-A-Ši-iR-Ta, (wedge-sign, 4th sign)
- Cuneiform-u--Sign No. u-1---
- Cuneiform-ú--Sign No. u-2----(approximate: only 3 verticals for ú, (the common alphabetic u))
- Cuneiform-Ù-(u-3)--Sign No. 7---
  - (With an added horizontal,, after the left vertical)

Also:

- Cuneiform-ar, (Shuwardata of Amarna letter EA 282)
- Cuneiform-nim-(nem, nim, num, and Sumerograms NIM, NUM) (EA 34)
