= Aš (cuneiform) =

Cuneiform sign

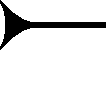
Cuneiform sign for aš, dil, ina, ṭel, and as sumerogram AŠ, (sign uses from the Epic of Gilgamesh).

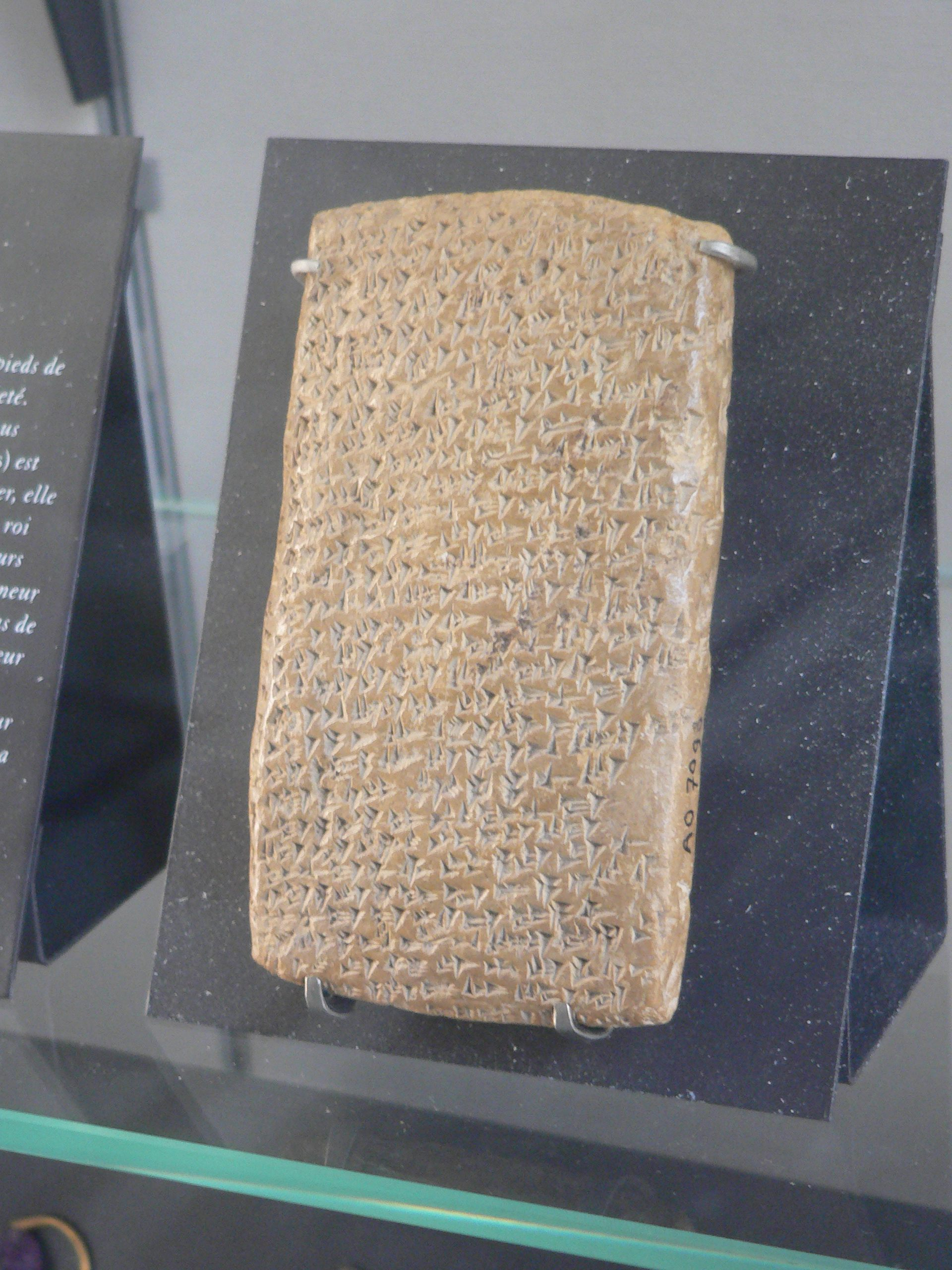
Amarna letter 362-(Reverse), Rib-Hadda to Pharaoh, with usage of cuneiform aš in the spelling of šapāru, "to send in writing)" (two locations in letter, line 18 obverse, line 52 reverse). (high resolution, expandible photo)

The cuneiform Aš sign, is found in both the 14th century BC Amarna letters and the Epic of Gilgamesh. In the Epic, it has the following meanings, besides aš:

aš
dil
ina
ṭel
AŠ

Some special considerations for a single "cuneiform sign" are as follows. In Egyptian hieroglyphs, the space for a group of signs (in cuneiform, a group of individual strokes), is called (quadrat)-block. Among cuneiform signs, only a handful of signs (specifically the individual 'strokes', horizontal, vertical, "wedge", 'half-strokes', etc.) are found in single usage. For aš specifically, (the full-length, horizontal stroke) its highest usage in the Epic of Gilgamesh is for the preposition ina (for in, into, etc.; confer for a specific "ina" usage (by Kovacs), Gilgamesh flood myth#Alternative translations). The specific usage numbers for the sign's meaning in the Epic is as follows: aš-(4), dil-(3), ina-(284), ṭel-(1), AŠ-(1). The high usage as the preposition may be for space considerations, but it should be considered that the Epic of Gilgamesh was also a "training document" for scribes, over hundreds of years, so the multi-functioning of signs may also have been in issue, (one cuneiform sign substituted for the preposition: i-na, of two signs.)

== Usage in the Amarna letters ==
The most common use of cuneiform aš in the Amarna letters is for the spelling of "šapāru", for to send, to send in writing. Besides the usage for "šapāru" in EA 362 (pictured), it is also used to spell šapāru in EA 34, titled The Pharaoh's reproach Answered, line 8, Obverse—spelled, ta-aš--tap-ra.

Amarna letter EA 28, titled Messengers Detained and a Protest, uses aš for the spelling of "aššum", Akkadian language because of-(concerning, regarding), and in EA 28, line 24, obverse, Paragraph III, Tushratta, (of Mitanni) continues in his letter: ... "regarding" (the)-Messengers (i.e. Pirissi and Tulubri)....
