= Tur (cuneiform) =

Cuneiform sign

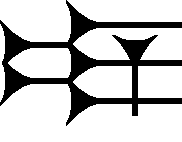
Digital version, cuneiform sign for tur, and Sumerograms BÀN, DUMU, or TUR.

The cuneiform sign for tur is used to denote one syllabic usage, tur, or the sign's Sumerograms; it is used in the Epic of Gilgamesh and the 14th century BC Amarna letters. The sign is based on the i (cuneiform) sign, with the one small added vertical stroke.

Besides tur, it is for Sumerograms (logograms) BÀN, DUMU, and TUR. In the Epic of Gilgamesh, it is used in the following numbers: tur-(11 times), BÀN-(3), DUMU-(25), TUR-(2). The large usage of DUMU in the Epic is for the Sumerogram being the equivalent of "son", Akkadian language "māru".

== Amarna letter usage ==
In the Amarna letters, the topic of Amarna letter EA 296, Under the Yoke, is the guarding of two cities, at the city gate; also the man authoring the letter, Yabitiri-(Yahtiru)-(governor?) of City? gives his history of going to Egypt to be trained with the Pharaoh, EA 296, line 25 (tablet reverse): "... (25) "i-nu-ma TUR a-na-ku", (26) he (Yanhamu) took me to (Egypt) Misri (27)..., (25) "Now when "YOUNG"-(I, myself), (26) he (i.e. Yanhamu) took me to Egypt, (27) ..."

== Common text usage ==
The most common text usage is unlike the digital version. It is composed of 5-horizontals: one (single) above two pairs of two, and all sitting on a large single horizontal stroke, approximated as follows:

....
.....
.....

It is found in various Amarna letters as part of "Messenger-Xxxxx", for example "LÚ.PA.TUR-Uv-wx-yz"
