= Ù (cuneiform) =

Approximate shape, and size of "compacted" Ù-(must add horizontal stroke,, after "left vertical").

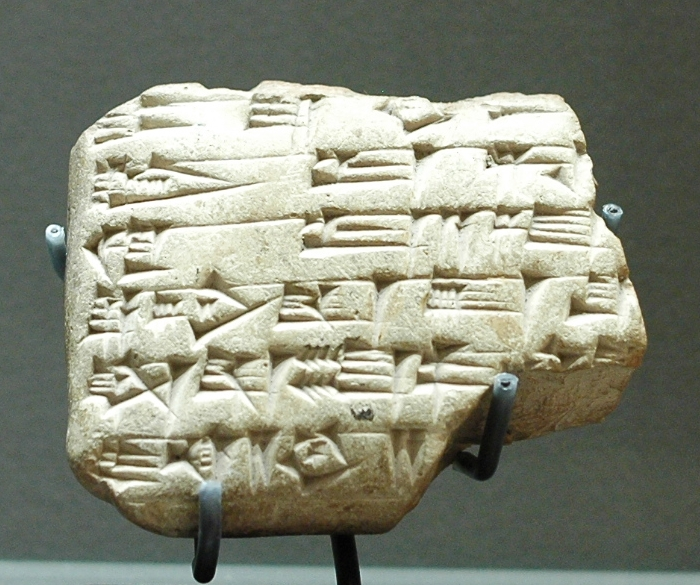
(relatively ancient form of ù) Use of ù at start of Line 3-(directly below LUGAL-(king) of line 2). Early 2nd millennium BC clay tablet of King Zimri-Lim of Mari.

The cuneiform ù sign ('u, no. 3'), is found in both the 14th century BC Amarna letters and the Epic of Gilgamesh. Its use is as a conjunction, (translated as for example: and, but, else, until, etc.), but rarely it is substituted for alphabetic u, but that vowel u is typically represented by 'u, no. 2', (u prime), ú; occasionally 'u, no. 1', (u (cuneiform)),, (mostly used for a conjunction, and numeral 10), is also substituted for the "alphabetic u".

The use of ù is often as a "stand-alone" conjunction, for example between two listed items, but it is used especially as a segue in text, (example Amarna letters), when changing topics, or when inserting segue-pausing positions. In the Amarna letters, it is also commonly immediately followed by a preposition: a-na, or i-na, used as "...And, to....", or "...And, in...."; also "...But, for....", etc. This usage with a preposition is also a better example of the segue usage.

Of the three u's, by graphemic analysis (Buccellati, 1979), the commonness is as follows:

ù (cuneiform), conjunction only (but also rare, for alphabetic "u")
ú (cuneiform), alphabetic 'u'
u (cuneiform), alphabetic (minor), 10, conjunction (highest use)

Both "ù (cuneiform)" and ú are in the top 25 most used signs, but E (cuneiform) and "u (cuneiform)" are not; other vowels (or combination) in the 25 are: a (cuneiform), i (cuneiform), and ia (cuneiform), (ia which has a secondary use as suffix, "-mine", or "my", thus in top 25 most used signs). Suffix "iYa" is used in the Middle East\Southwest Asia at present day to end placenames, or other names: "My Xxxxx".

Usage numbers of ù in the Epic of Gilgamesh is as follows: ù-(84); Buccellati's usage numbers (330 Amarna letters) is (1848).

== Amarna letter varieties ==
Scribal variants of ù exist, and especially in the Amarna letters. At least one Amarna letter, EA 367, (Pharaoh to Endaruta), has an atypical variant, but the entire letter has somewhat unusual cuneiform signs. (gáb(káp)-(4 uses), tá, and a variant form of um) ("um" also =ṭup, also in the letter, for "clay tablet"-(tuppu), etc.)

- Cuneiform-Ù--(EA 367-scribe variant)----(plus added-, covering up the (2)-3 horizontals, (and one added horizontal), as a complete replacement, instead of the horizontals!). The resultant is: wedge+Vertical+wedge+Vertical! (takes up same amount of clay tablet line-space)

== Partial list of signs beginning with wedge (u) ==
Partial list of signs beginning with u-(wedge), from the Epic of Gilgamesh (Parpola, 1971), and the Amarna letters:

- Cuneiform-u--Sign No. 1----(conjunction use, and "10"; occasionally for u)
- Cuneiform-AMAR, ṣur, zur--Sign No. 2---; Sumerogram: See!-(AMAR) (Akkadian language, "amāru", to see, behold)-(Note: minus the vertical stroke)
- Cuneiform-di--Sign No. 3---
- Cuneiform-ki--Sign No. 4---
- Cuneiform-mi-(Sign 5)
- Cuneiform-ši--Sign No. 6---
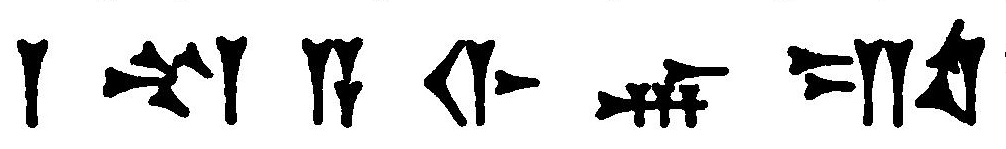
- Cuneiform-ši, lim, or IGI ("in 'face' of", "before" Sumerogram)--Sign No. 6--- --(Abdi-Ashirta), Abdi-A-Ši-iR-Ta, (wedge-sign, 4th sign)
- Cuneiform-u--Sign No. u-1---
- Cuneiform-ú--Sign No. u-2----(approximate: only 3 verticals for ú, (the common alphabetic u))
- Cuneiform-ù-(u-3)--Sign No. 7---
  - (With an added horizontal,, after the left vertical)

Also:

- Cuneiform-ar, (Shuwardata of Amarna letter EA 282)
- Cuneiform-ar--..(=ši + ri)
- Cuneiform-nim-(nem, nim, num, and Sumerograms NIM, NUM) (EA 34)
