= ERIM (Sumerogram) =

Cuneiform sign

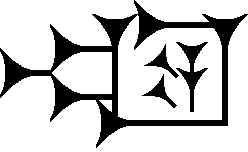
A Cuneiform-compound-KA x ERIM enclosing the cuneiform character for army, or troops.

ERIM is the capital letter-(majuscule) Sumerogram for the Akkadian language word army, or "troops". The akkadian language word for army is ("ṣābu"-using s-dot, the special s); consequently the cuneiform character for ERIM is also equivalent to sab, zab, etc.-(also using s-dot).

The cuneiform-compound for the enclosed use of the 'army' cuneiform character is the akkadian language word for battle, or warfare, akkadian "tāhāzu"-(also a sumerogram: MÈ-no. 098, Parpola). In the Yašdata letter with the place-name for Hannathon, the determinative is used at the beginning of the word battle, then tāhāzu is spelled ta-ha-(zu).

== Epic of Gilgamesh ==
The cuneiform character for "army"-sab is used 19 times in the Epic of Gilgamesh tablets-(chapters). It is used only once as zab; also only once as ERIM, for "armies" in Chapter XI, as ERIM-mesh(the plural), for "men, troops".

== Amarna letter usage ==
In the 1350 BC Amarna letters, the army sumerogram ERIM is used in the formulaic introduction to the pharaoh of ancient Egypt-(mostly Amenhotep IV-Akhenaten, or his father Amenhotep III). The addressing is towards the 'good health'-Shalom-(Akkadian language šālāmu-"to be safe") of the list of pharaoh's charges, and near the end of the list his "troops", or armies are addressed: as ERIM-mesh; (mesh is the plural as "s", in the Akkadian language). The more notable kings used this formal introduction to the pharaoh, for example Tushratta of Mitanni, the "King of Alashiya"-(now known as the island Cyprus); also the king of Babylon, Burna-Buriash; also Kadashman-Enlil I of Babylon.

A more distinctive use of the army cuneiform character in the Amarna letters, is in the cuneiform-compound for the word 'battle', as a determinative in Amarna letter no. 245, concerning a story about Yašdata, with the subject being the Habiru man, Labaya.

== See also ==
- Hannathon–Amarna letter using the determinative, and spelling out of word for "battle"-"warfare"/-("tāhāzu")—Topic: Labaya, and Yašdata.
