= Meš =

Cuneiform sign

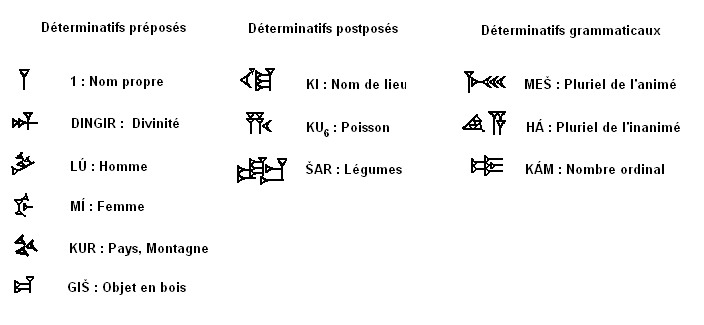
3rd column: cuneiform sign for .MEŠ, (or meš)

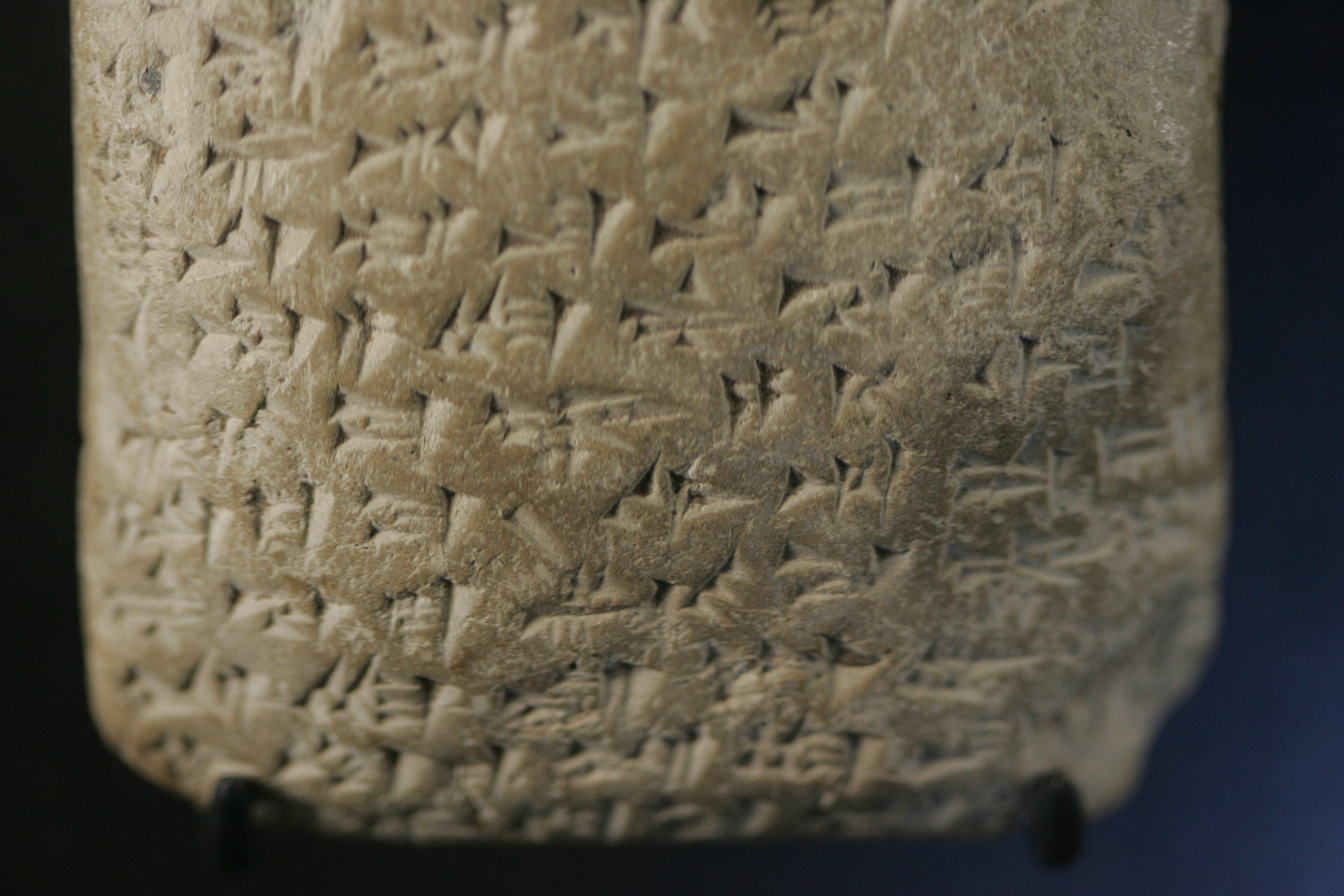
Amarna letter EA 365, Biridiya to Pharaoh, reverse (lines 15–30, (31)). 5th line from bottom, (line 23), (men:'massu'), "LÚ.MEŠ–ma-as-sà-meš (and)". Line 25, 3rd from bottom, repeats the long name. (high resolution, expandible photo)

The cuneiform MEŠ, or meš is a plural form attached at the end of Mesopotamian cuneiform words as a suffix. As part of a name (PN, personal name, or other), or major class being referenced, in capital letters (a Sumerogram form), it is typically separated from other capital letter Sumerograms with a period. The name of the group can follow, in lower case letters, for example: (men-massu, Amarna letter EA 365), LÚ.MEŠ–ma-as-sà-meš, (and using a secondary suffix meš, not being typical).

The MEŠ cuneiform is a vertical stroke, followed by three or four angled smaller wedge-strokes. The strokes can also be "not angled", but 45 degree wedges, smaller, or large. For example, Amarna letter EA 161, Aziru to Pharaoh, shows a series of six preparation items listed sequentially. The following wedges (on the meš or Sumerogram .MEŠ wedges, are large, and the scribe has a scribing base line, that follows the vertical stroke, a baseline on which the wedges are placed sequentially. EA 161 shows the baseline 'remainder', extending beyond the last 3rd, or 4th wedge.

Another common plural in the Amarna letters is HI.A,, found in personal names (Abdi-Heba), and the plural.

== Usage, Amarna letters and Epic of Gilgamesh ==
In the Epic of Gilgamesh, (Tablets I-XII) the meš sign is used as follows: as meš, 8 times, as MEŠ, 253 times.

In the Amarna letters, the meš sign is often referencing people, or types of people, but another common usage is KUR.MEŠ, since "land", or regions are often being discussed by the 'governors' of the city-states (called the 'man' of the city, typically).

== Meš, as cuneiform "Me", + cuneiform "Eš" ==
The meš sign can be considered to be 1.--me (cuneiform). .(the horizontal "baseline"), 2.--with 3 vertical wedges., (eš (cuneiform)).

A specific deviation from the standard can be seen in EA 153 (EA 153, Metropolitan Museum ), where five uses of meš, are based on only 1-wedge, (or a ligatured 2-wedges); it looks approximately as follows for one wedge, They are used for army^{meš}, as ERIM.MEŠ (EA 153:8, 11), also "men", LÚ.MEŠ (EA 153:9), feet (EA 153:3), and ships (EA 153:10).

== Meš, 2-basic styles ==
Two basic types of meš signs are either expressed as wedges laid horizontally, following the vertical stroke, or wedges expressed at an angle, at any level of angle, upward, but all of consistent size.

As wedges inscribed on a horizontal baseline, the wedges are usually centered, following the large vertical stroke; the horizontal baseline is not always exactly at the midpoint of the vertical stroke. The following wedges are either full-size, (or sometimes oversized); the wedges are also sometimes any percentage less than a full 3/4-wedge, or 1/2-wedge.

Angled wedges are often much smaller expressed wedges, from 1/2 to 1/3? size. For space considerations, the angled wedges can be extremely high-angled, towards vertical, thus saving "horizontal text space"; alternatively, the wedges could be spaced out, allowing for the consumption of more 'line-text-space'.

One example Amarna letter is a combination of the two horizontal, and angled wedge expressions. EA 153 has the "meš" sign built upon the vertical stroke, then 1-horizontal, and 2-angled strokes, laid across it at approximately 45 degrees. (The horizontal can be "an 'unseen', or 'overwritten' base" for the angled wedges laid upon it. In EA 153 the base line "head" is used as the first wedge-(non-angled), following by the angled wedge-2 and wedge-3.)

=== Amarna letter types by letter ===
Horizontal, w/ 3-, 4-wedges

- EA 15
- EA 19
- EA 23
- EA 28
- EA 31
- EA 35
- EA 161
- EA 205
- EA 252
- EA 282
- EA 287
- EA 288
- EA 289
- EA 290
- EA 325
- EA 367
- EA 369

Angled 3-, 4-wedges

- EA 86
- EA 144
- EA 147
- EA 270
- EA 271
- EA 273
- EA 296
- EA 362
- EA 364
- EA 365
