= Ar (cuneiform) =

Cuneiform sign

The cuneiform Ar sign,.—is a cuneiform sign that is a combined sign, containing Ši (cuneiform), and Ri (cuneiform). It is used in one prominent name in the Amarna letters, for Šuwardata, as well as in a number of Amarna letters. "Ar" is also used in the Epic of Gilgamesh, and other texts.

== Epic of Gilgamesh usage ==
The Ar sign usage in the Epic of Gilgamesh is as follows: ar-(21 times).
