= Ni (cuneiform) =

Cuneiform sign

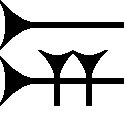
Cuneiform ni (digitized form ni).

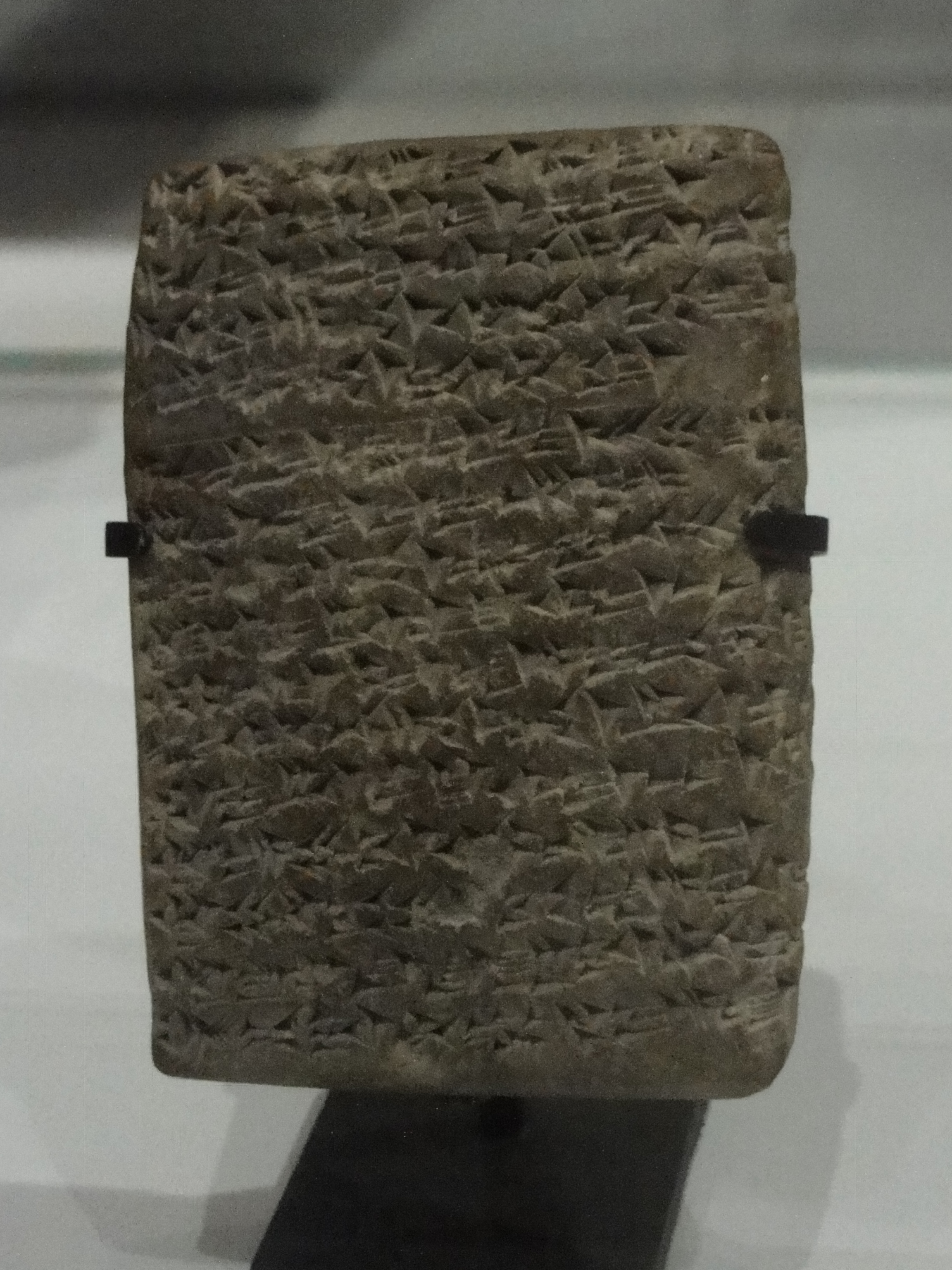
Amarna letter EA 367 (titled: "Pharaoh to a Vassal"). A common Amarna letter that uses cuneiform ni.

The cuneiform sign ni is a common-use sign of the Amarna letters, the Epic of Gilgamesh, and other cuneiform texts. It has a secondary sub-use in the Amarna letters for addressing the Pharaoh, from the vassal states of Canaan. The address to the Pharaoh is often 'King-Lord-Mine': LUGAL, EN-ia which has many varieties of expression. "LUGAL” is the Sumerian name (meaning “king”) for the cuneiform glyph read in the Akkadian language as "Šarru", translating as English "king", and EN is read in Akkadian as bēlu, for "Lord", (thus "King, Lord-Mine"). In some Amarna letters the sub-use of ni is lí, for spelling "bēlu", be-lí often.

There are other sub-uses of ni (see Epic of Gilgamesh usage below). It is also found in some Amarna letters, EA 9, and EA 252, for example where ni or lí is scribed in a "flourish" format (an over-lengthened version of the two-horizontals that construct the sign), similar to tab,. In EA 9 especially, there is a 'scribe margin line', both left and right on the clay tablet obverse. For the right margin, some words in the lower paragraphs of the obverse (Para 4–7), some words ending with ni/lí, have the sign lengthened, and sitting upon the right margin line-(the cuneiform text, in EA 9, reads: left-to-right).

== Epic of Gilgamesh usage ==
The ni sign usage in the Epic of Gilgamesh is as follows: lí-(5) times, né-(42), ni-(326), ṣal-(8), zal-(1), Ì-(9) times. Ì, the Sumerogram is Akkadian language "šamnu", for English "oil".

Because of its multiple usages in the Epic, ni, or lí, can be used as a syllabic for " "ne", "ni", or "li"/"lí", etc. It also can be used as a syllabic for combinations related to: "sal", "ṣal", or "zal"; (in Akkadian many consonants, or the 4-vowels, a, e, i, u can be interchanged, for performing the final Akkadian language 'dictionary word').
