= Ka (cuneiform) =

Cuneiform sign

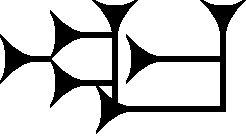
Digitized cuneiform sign for ka.

Most common form (Hittite ka) in the Amarna letters. Sign for ka.

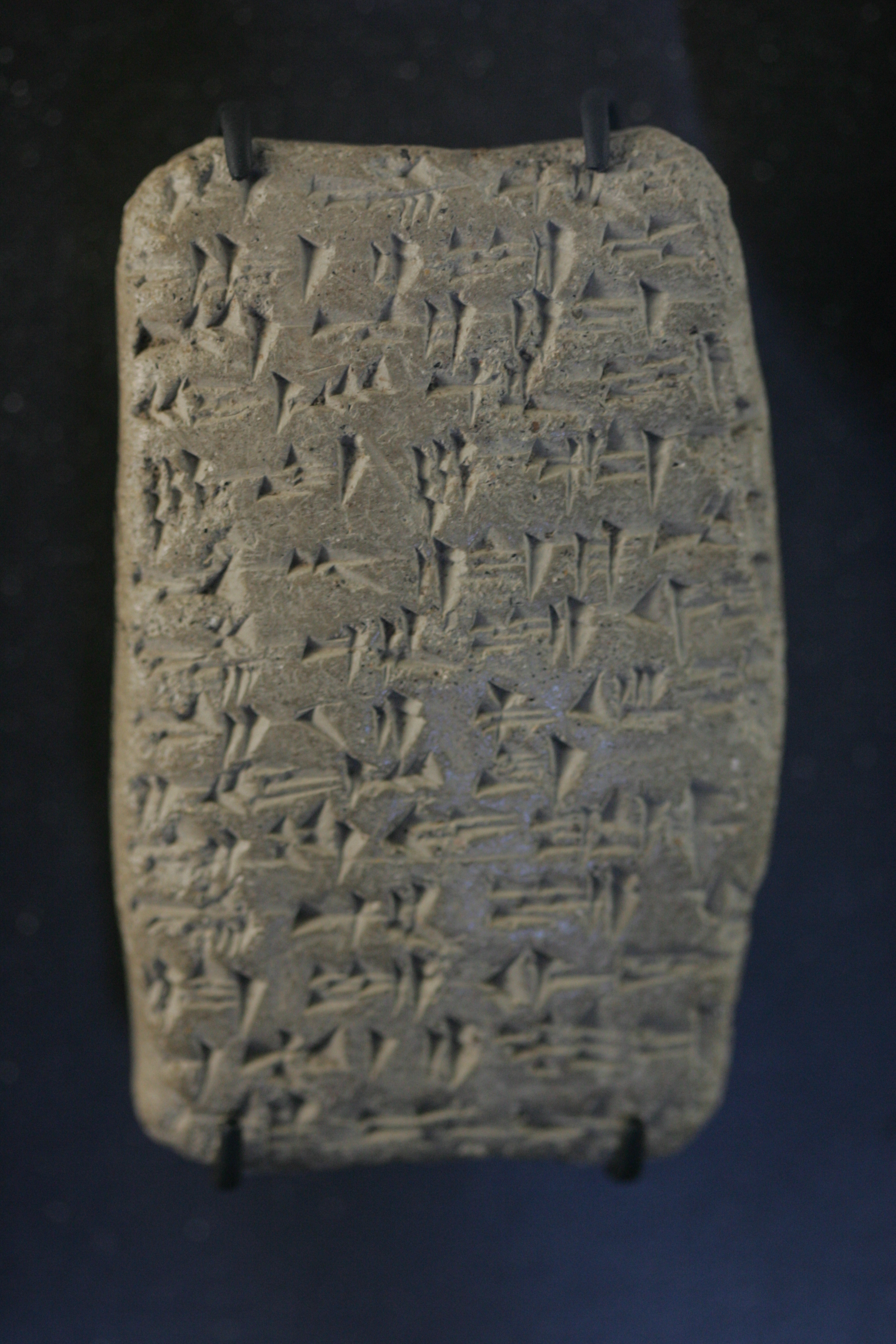
Amarna letter EA 364-(Obverse), Ayyab to Pharaoh, "Justified War"; line 3 (2nd sign for ka): "Servant-yours, at...", "ARAD-ka, a-na...." (Note: the 2 horizontals at the right side of "ka", are barely visible, compared to the 2 well-scribed verticals) (high resolution expandable photo)

The cuneiform ka sign is a common, multi-use sign, a syllabic for ka, and an alphabetic sign used for k, or a; it is common in both the Epic of Gilgamesh over hundreds of years, and the 1350 BC Amarna letters. Cuneiform "ka" is nearly identical to a similar 'mid-size' to larger cuneiform sign, ša (cuneiform); because both ka, and ša have two separate specific uses, once these usage sites are identified on a specific Amarna letter, for example, the difference between the two can be followed.

Cuneiform ka has a secondary use as the pronoun suffix, -yours. For Ayyab's letter, EA 364 (pictured), after addressing the Pharaoh, part of the Introduction, is to state "...Servant-yours, ...." Specifically, Ayyab is from one of the vassal states/city-states/towns in Canaan, thus the relationship to the Pharaoh in the Amarna letters often state a relationship of being the Pharaoh's servant. This is dramatically juxtaposed against the Amarna letters from Tushratta of Mitanni, (letters EA 19, EA 23, EA 26, EA 28, EA 30-(only a passport-type, short letter), etc.), or from Babylon, or the King of Alashiya. The letters from those kings have long lists, as part of the Introduction stating: May you (King, pharaoh) have peace (health), ... for, wives-yours, for sons-yours, for magnates-yours-("sa-meš"), etc.

For cuneiform ša, its specific sub-usage (besides as a syllabic, or alphabetic), is as a segue form of a conjunction typically at the beginning of a statement, translated as: "which...", "what...", etc., with the rest of text to follow.

== Ka, and Ša, the stroke differences ==
The difference in the construction of the signs ka and ša are as follows: "ka" when scribed in the Amarna letters often shows the distinctiveness of the right section of the sign, versus the left section. For ša, the right section is constructed with two wedge strokes (one scribed above the other), between the two verticals, at right. For ka, the right side mostly, in the Amarna letters has two verticals, with two horizontals that cross both of them; (the right side is like a two-step ladder shape—(for Hittite ka:—)).

== Usage numbers ==
The usage numbers for ka in the Epic of Gilgamesh are as follows: ka-(372), and sumerograms: DUG_{4}-(18), KA-(9), ZÚ-(4).

== Multiple "ka" listing usage, the Brother-King letters ==
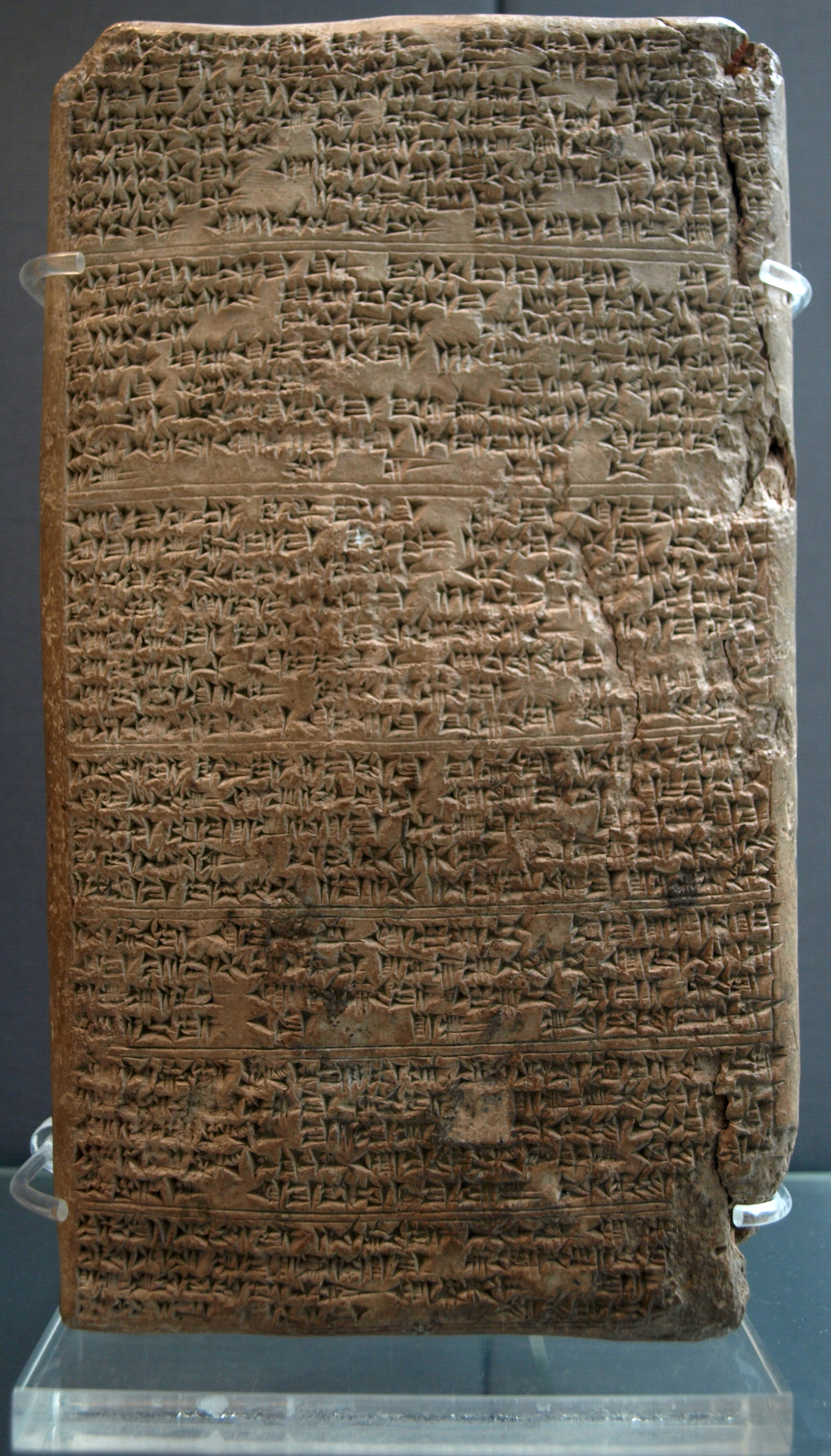
Amarna letter EA 19.

In contrast to the vassal Amarna letters from the Canaanite city-states, or equivalent, which use the subservient prostration formula in its many variations, the letters from the brother-kings, namely the King of Babylon, Burna-Buriash, Tushratta, the King of Mitanni, and the "King of Alashiya", (Assyria had only EA 15, and EA 16, with very short introductions), sometimes had very long lists of "good wishes for 'possessions' of the Pharaoh". Each item, (often), when addressing the Pharaoh ended with the suffix -yours (ka). The list often ended with ...for chariots-yours, for army-yours, for land-yours, and for everything-yours...." An example of the usage can be seen in EA 19, with a focus on the beginning of the last line (no. 8) of Paragraph I, (high res , extremely high res ). The beginning of line 8, Para I is as follows:

a-na KUR-ka ..(space) ("for LAND-yours..(segue)..")

and continues:

ù a-na mim-mu-ka ...(segue).... ("and for Everything-yours..(space)....")

The cuneiform characters being:

--, __-- (...for Land-yours ..)

and continues:

--((~)And)(--)--, __(--)-- (..."And"--for "EveryThing"-yours ....!)
