= Qa (cuneiform) =

Cuneiform sign

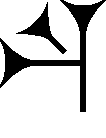
Cuneiform qa. (digitized form qa, and other meanings)

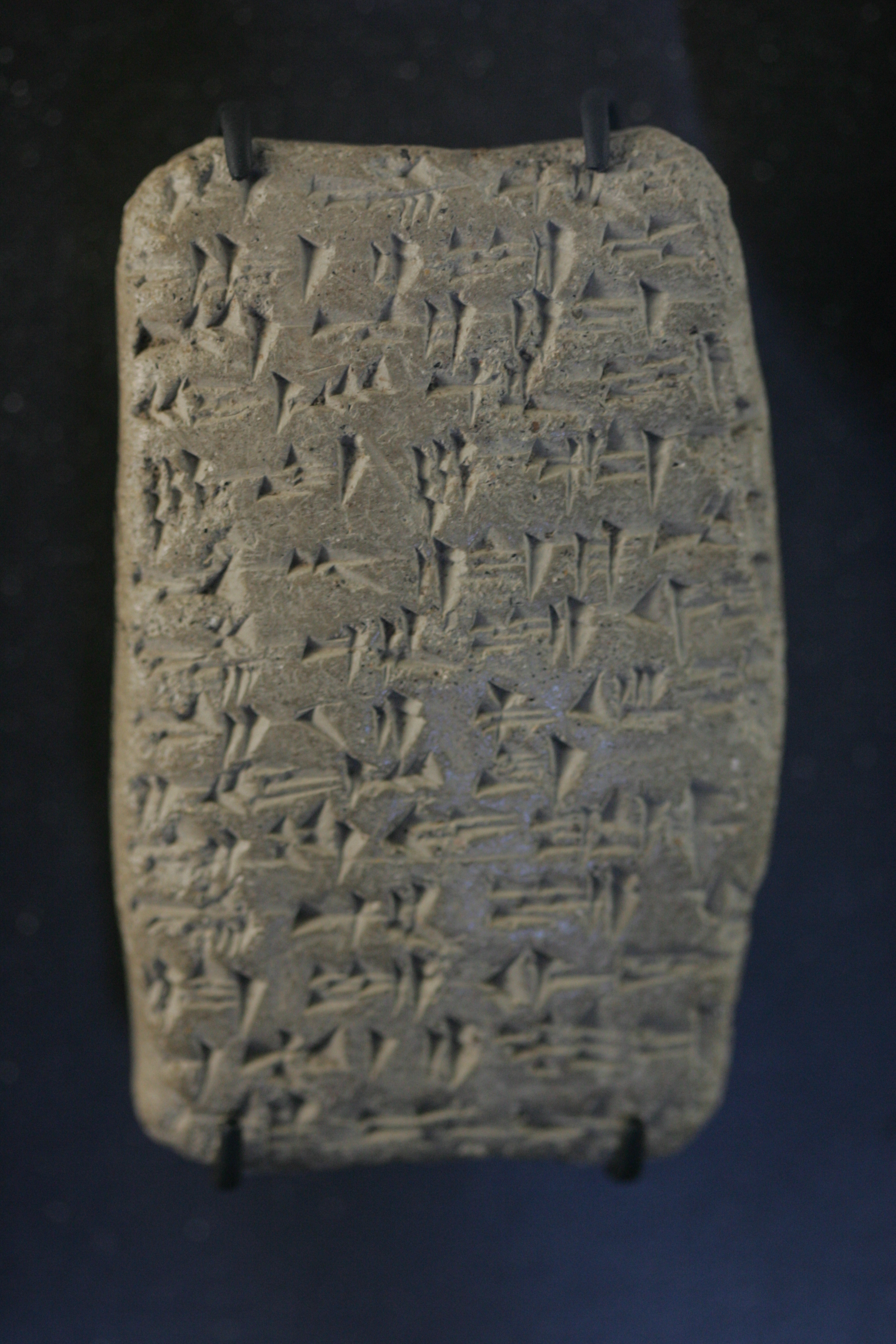
Amarna letter EA 364-(titled: "Justified War"). A common Amarna letter that uses cuneiform qa.

The cuneiform sign qa, is a common-use sign of the Amarna letters, the Epic of Gilgamesh, and other cuneiform texts (for example Hittite texts). It has a secondary sub-use in the Amarna letters for ka4.

Linguistically, it has the alphabetical usage in texts for q, a, or qa, and also a replacement for "q", by k, or g.

== Epic of Gilgamesh usage ==
The qa sign usage in the Epic of Gilgamesh is as follows: qa-(109 times).
