= Iš (cuneiform) =

Cuneiform sign

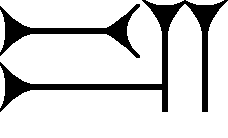
Cuneiform iš. (Digitized version)

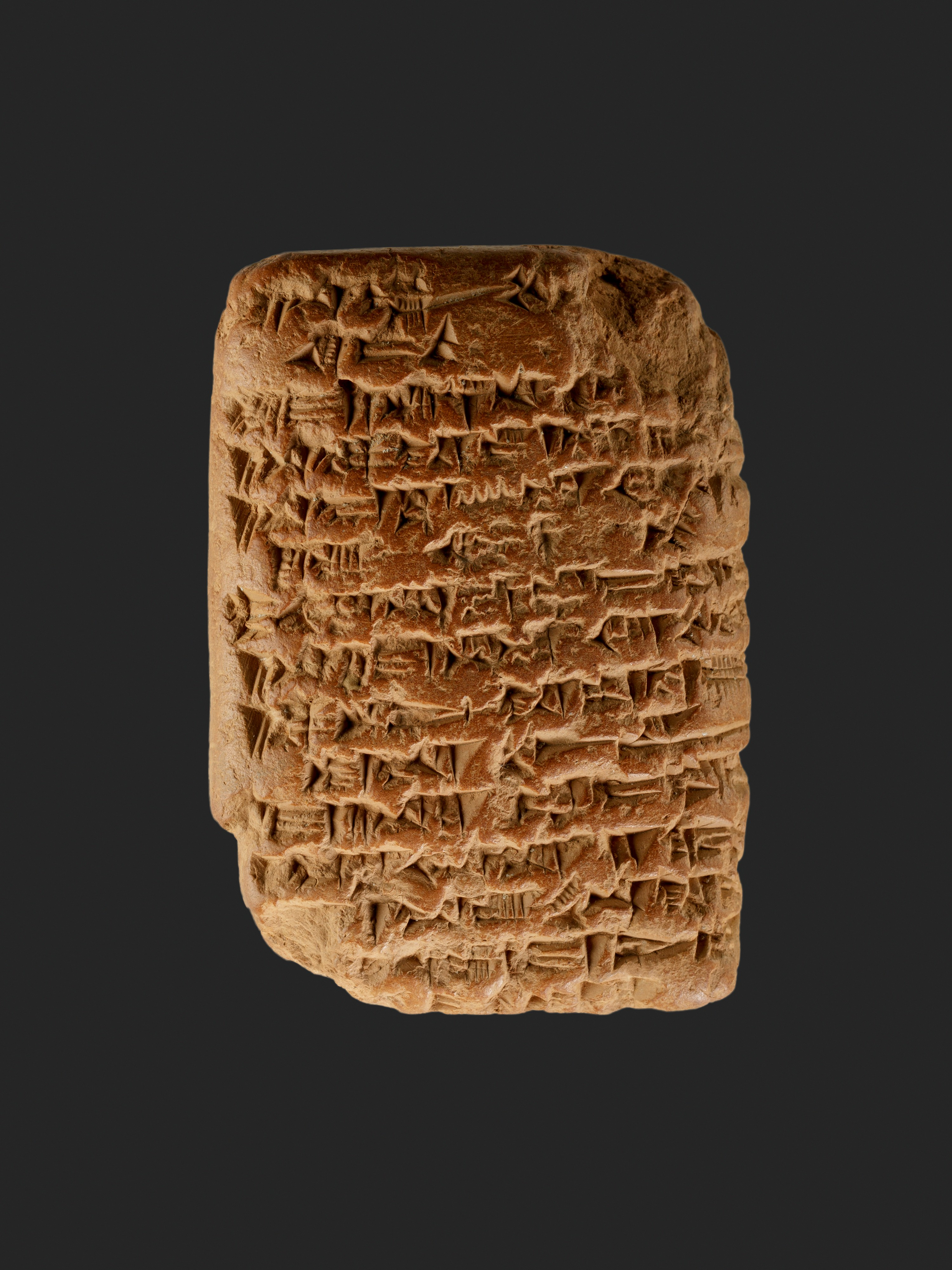
Amarna letter EA 15-(titled: "Assyria joins the International Scene"). Cuneiform sign iš, line 10, EA 15, Obverse. (See line drawing below)

The cuneiform sign iš is a common use sign in the Amarna letters and the Epic of Gilgamesh. It is used syllabically for iš; also for mel, mil, and a Sumerogramic usage for IŠ (Epic of Gilgamesh). Alphabetically as "iš", its most common usage, it can be used for "i" or "š". In Akkadian, the four vowels a, e, i, o, are all interchangeable, and the three different "s", can also be interchanged: s, ṣ, š.

== Epic of Gilgamesh use ==
For the Epic of Gilgamesh, the following usage is found in Tablets I-XII: iš-(134 times); mel-(1); mil-(8); IŠ-(18 times).

== Some common uses of "iš" in the Amarna letters ==
One of the most common uses of "iš" in the Amarna letters, is the use of the Akkadian language word "ištu", which means "from", ("since"), in English. In the vassal city-state letters, in dialogue with the Pharaoh-in-Egypt, there is often mention of having listened to the correspondence – "words of the pharaoh", thus the words — "I have heard ...", or "I have listened to ...", the clay tablet "words" (correspondence), from the pharaoh. The common Akkadian word for "hear", or "listen", is "šemû".
