= Šu =

Cuneiform sign

Cuneiform sign for šu, qat, and Sumerogram ŠU.

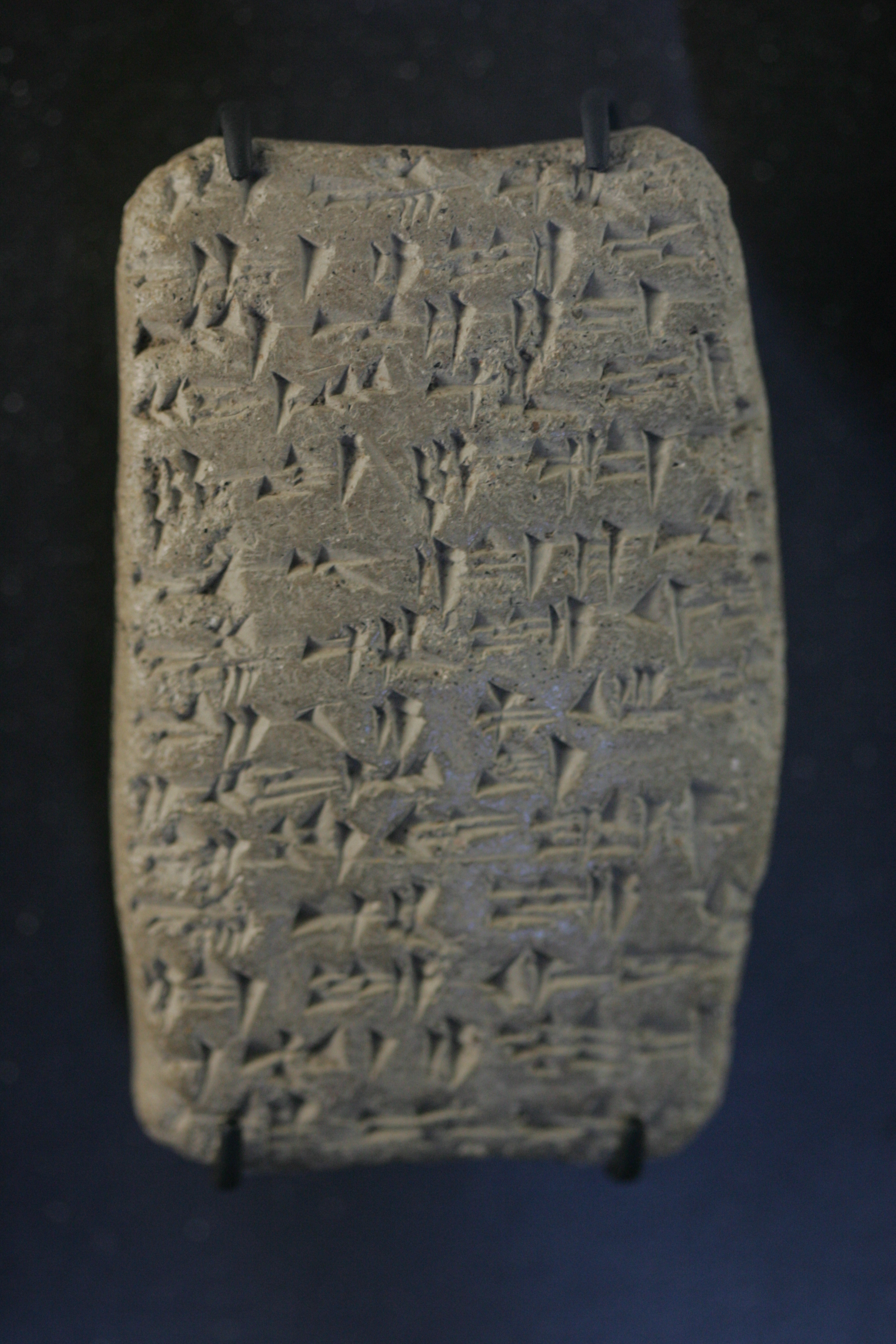
Amarna letter EA 364-(Obverse), Ayyab to Pharaoh, "Justified War"; line 5: 7 times 7, "7 šu 7". (High Resolution expandable photo)

The cuneiform šu sign is a common, multi-use syllabic and alphabetic sign for šu, š, and u; it has a subsidiary usage for syllabic qat; it also has a majuscule-(capital letter) Sumerogram usage for ŠU, for Akkadian language "qātu", the word for "hand". The cuneiform character šu is shaped like a human hand and was created late 4th millennium BC or early 3rd millennium BC.

The scribal usage of a sign allows for any of the 4 vowels (there is no vowel 'o' in Akkadian), a, e, i, u to be interchangeable; thus a usage for syllabic qat could conceivably be used for the following (k can replace 'q', and d can replace 't'): q, a, or t; also ka, qa, ad, at. (The "š" (shibilant s) is also interchangeable with the other two esses, "s", and "ṣ", for "šu"!)

The šu sign is quite common in the Amarna letters and the Epic of Gilgamesh as follows: qat-(16), šu-(420), ŠU-(13).
