= Tab (cuneiform) =

Cuneiform sign

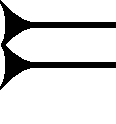
Cuneiform tab, tap, and ṭab; also TAB, sign. (Assyrian)

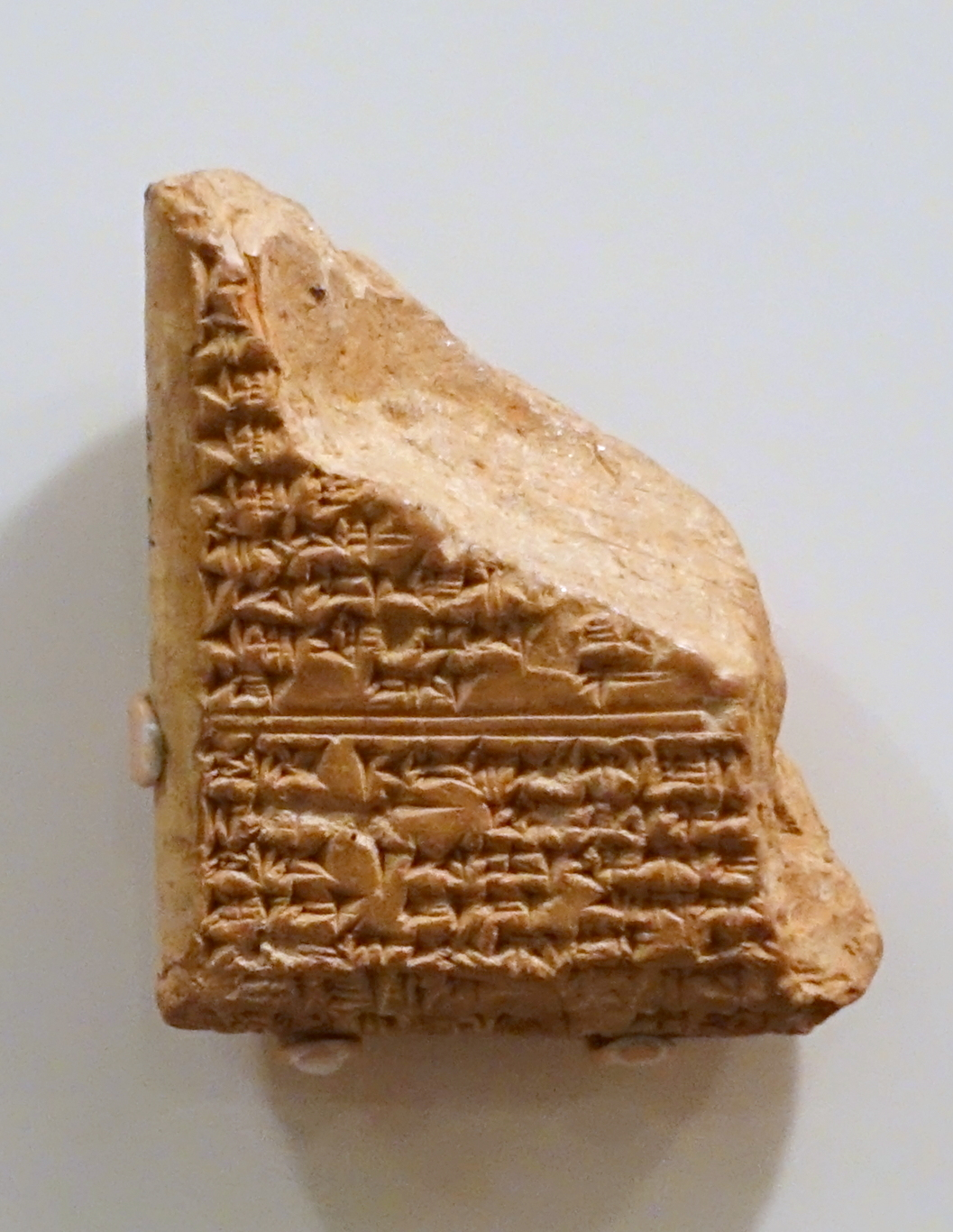
EA 26, fragment (Obverse). (high-resolution expandable photo)

The cuneiform sign tap, or tab (also ṭab and TAB), is a common use sign in the Amarna letters and the Epic of Gilgamesh. It is used syllabically for tab, tap, ṭap, or TAB, (TAB as parts of personal names, places, or common words, etc.), and alphabetically for "t" (or "ṭ"), or "a". (All the 4 vowels, a, e, i, o are interchangeable.)

== Epic of Gilgamesh use ==
For the Epic of Gilgamesh, the following usage is found in Tablets I-XII: tab-(12 times); tap-(25); ṭap-(2); and TAB, (6 times).
