= Ri (cuneiform) =

Cuneiform sign

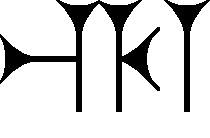
Cuneiform sign for ri, re, dal, tal, ṭal, and as Sumerogram RI, (sign uses from the Epic of Gilgamesh).

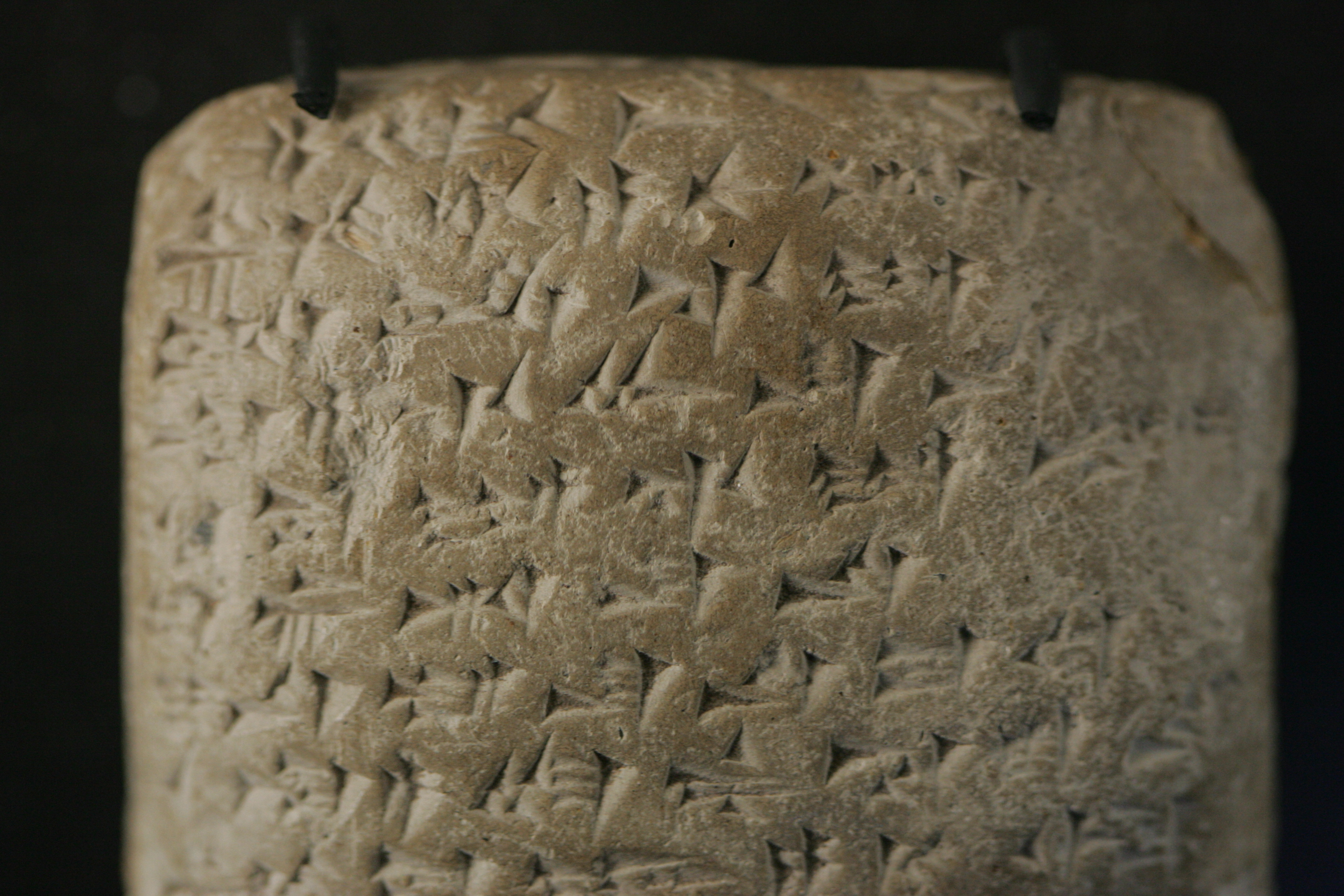
Amarna letter EA 365-(Reverse), Biridiya to Pharaoh, "Furnishing Corvée Workers", with usage of cuneiform re in the spelling of erēsu, "to cultivate" (te-er-ri-šu-na), 3rd character, 6th line from top (line 365:20). (high resolution, expandible photo)

The cuneiform Ri sign, or Re, is found in both the 14th-century BC Amarna letters and the Epic of Gilgamesh; it is in the top 25 most used cuneiform signs (Buccellati, 1979) for ri, or re, but has other syllabic or alphabetic uses, as well as the Sumerogram usage for RI (Epic of Gilgamesh).

The ri (cuneiform) sign has the following uses in the Epic of Gilgamesh:

dal
re
ri
tal
ṭal
RI (Sumerogram usage)

The specific usage numbers for the sign's meaning in the Epic is as follows: dal-(4), re-(56), ri-(372), tal-(70), ṭal-(2), RI-(1).

In the Amarna letters, ri also has a special usage when coupled with the naming of the Pharaoh, as "LUGAL-Ri". Lugal is the Sumerogram translated in the Akkadian language to 'King', Sarru. Thus in the Amarna letters, Lugal is used as a stand-alone, but sometimes supplemented with Ri, and specifically used as Sumerogram SÀR (an equivalent Sumerogram to mean LUGAL) to be combined with RI to make sarru for king. ('The King', as an appellation is sometimes created by adding ma (cuneiform), suffix to the end of a name (Lugal-ma.)
