= Ma (cuneiform) =

Cuneiform sign

Cuneiform sign for ma. Because of its commonness, it has few other alphabetic uses besides, ma, m, or a; there is a Sumerogram usage for MA.

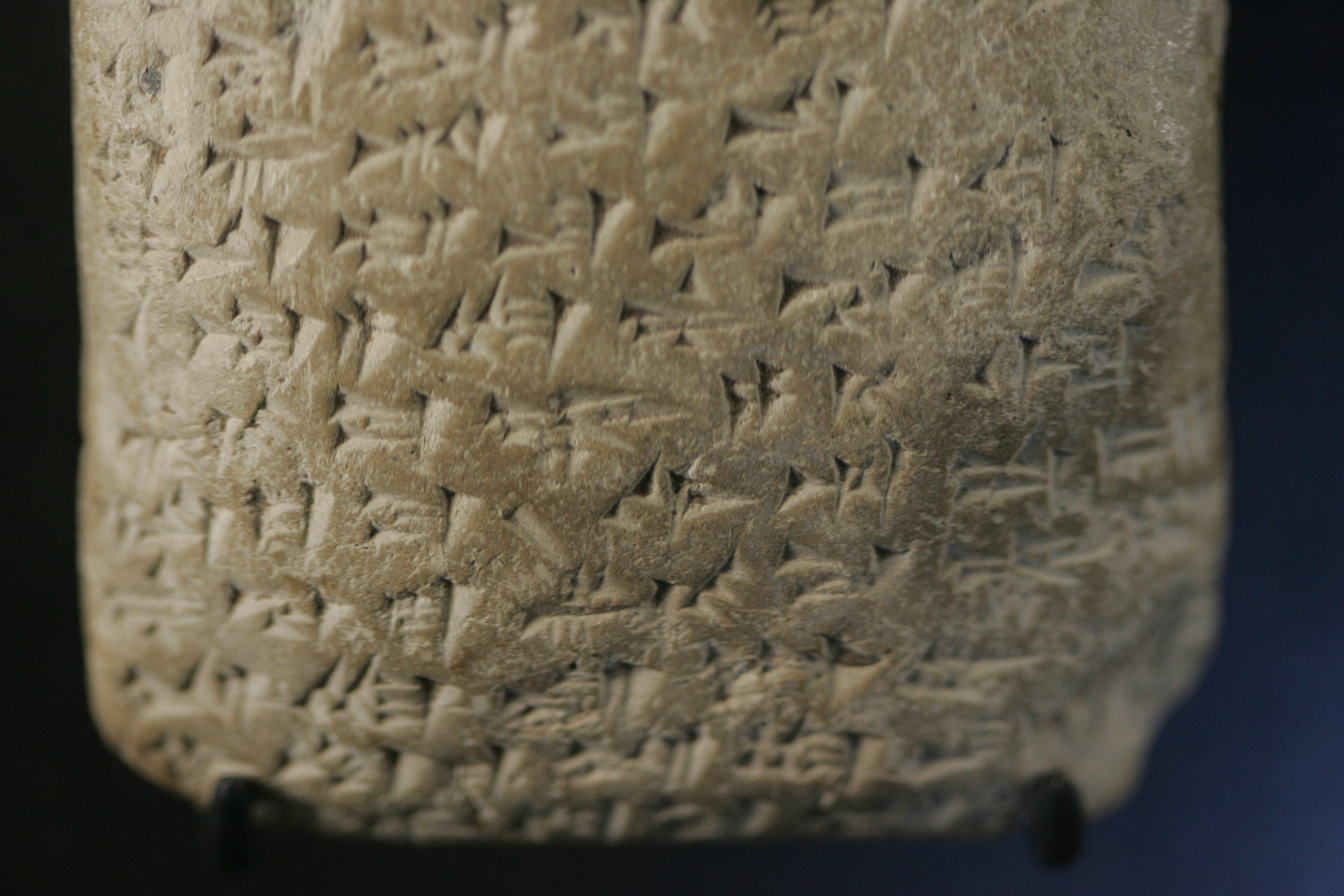
Amarna letter EA 365, "Furnishing Corvée Workers", Biridiya to Pharaoh, reverse (lines 15–30, (31)). 5th line from bottom, (line 23), "LÚ-MEŠ–ma-as-sà-meš (and)". Line 25, 3rd from bottom, repeats the long name. (high resolution, expandible photo)

The cuneiform ma sign, is found in both the 14th century BC Amarna letters and the Epic of Gilgamesh. In the Epic it is also used as the Sumerogram MA, (for Akkadian language "mina", manû, a weight measure, as MA.NA, or MA.NA.ÀM). The ma sign is often used at the end of words, besides its alphabetic usage inside words as syllabic ma, elsewhere for m, or a.

The usage of cuneiform ma in the Epic of Gilgamesh, is only exceeded by the usage of a (cuneiform) (1369 times, and 58, A (Sumerogram), versus 1047 times for ma, 6 for MA (Sumerogram)). The high usage for a is partially a result of the prepositional use for a-na-(Akkadian "ana", to, for, etc.); "i", also has an increased prepositional use of i (cuneiform), for Akkadian ina, (i-na), for in, into, etc.
