= A (cuneiform) =

Cuneiform sign

Cuneiform sign 𒀀 for a (d, and from the Epic of Gilgamesh, A, for Akkadian language mû, for water-(s), A (water Sumerogram), the sumerogram.

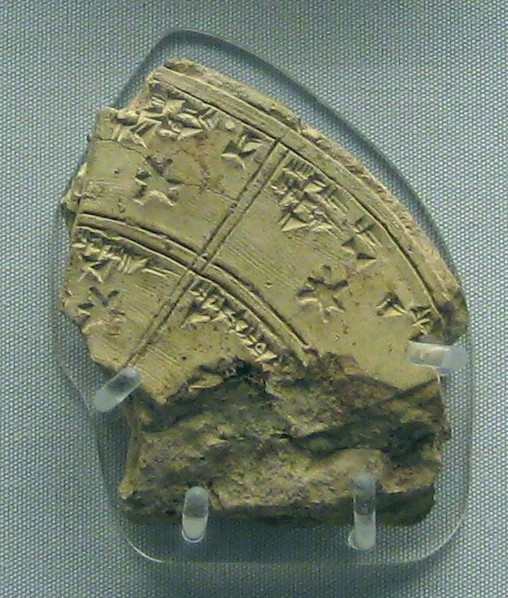
Planisphere fragment from Mesopotamia. Cuneiform a, upper register (left), last character, line 1, and right, in upper register, line 2, last character, (following be (cuneiform), and space).

The cuneiform sign 𒀀 (DIŠ, DIŠ OVER DIŠ) for a, and in the Epic of Gilgamesh the sumerogram A, Akkadian for mû, "water", which is used in the Gilgamesh flood myth, Chapter XI of the Epic, or other passages. The sign is also used extensively in the Amarna letters.

Cuneiform a is the most common of the four vowels in the Akkadian language, a, e, i, and u. All vowels can be interchangeable, depending on the scribe, though spellings of Akkadian words in dictionaries, will be formalized, and typically: unstressed, a 'long-vowel', or thirdly, a 'combined' vowel (often spelled with two signs (same vowel, ending the first sign, and starting the next sign), thus combined into the single vowel, â, ê, î, or û.). Cuneiform a is the most common of the four vowels, as can be shown by usage in the Epic of Gilgamesh, the usage numbers being (ú (u, no. 2) is more common than u, (no. 1), which has additional usages, numeral "10", and "and", "but", etc.): a-(1369), e-(327), i-(698), ú-(493). (For u, only: u-(166)); The usage for a, includes the usage for Akkadian a-na, (ana), the preposition, "for", "to", etc., about 250 usages (therefore usage: 1369–250).

== I-ligatured-a, as "ia", (iYa) ==
The combined vowel i,, connected (ligatured, attached to a), ligatured to cuneiform a is the ia (cuneiform). It has usages in the Akkadian language for words starting with "ia", for example "iā'u", (English "mine"), "iāši", (English "(to) me"), and "iāti", (English "me").

In the Amarna letters ia is also used as a suffix: -ia, for example Amarna letter EA 325, "To King (Pharaoh)-Lord-mine (-ia), God-mine, Sun-God-mine, ...." ("A-na Lugal-bēlu-ia, An-meš-ia, An-UTU-ia, ....")

== Amarna letter usage ==
The Amarna letter usage of cuneiform a has the same high usage for Akkadian language ana (a-na) as does the Epic of Gilgamesh.

Two other high usages for a and typical to the Amarna letters is the negative: lā, Akkadian language, "lā", used before the spelling of the verb, which follows. In the Epic of Gilgamesh it almost exclusively is spelled just lā, without the extra a. The opposite is true for the Amarna letters, which has it spelled almost exclusively la-a, (for "lā") thus making it very easy to find and read in the letters, and thus the verb usually follows.

=== Akkadian "enūma", "eninna", often a segue ===
Because the Amarna letters often state the condition of events in the regions where the letters originate, the events are often previewed by Now..., or When..., which are topical segues. They sometimes start new paragraphs. At a minimum, they simply continue the text, as 'seque transition points'. (Some letters, EA 19, Para 2, also include spaces, as part of the segue.)

The segue word: Akkadian language "enūma", (English "when") is only used three times in the Epic of Gilgamesh, as opposed to the Amarna letters where it is used hundreds of times (reverse side of EA 362, 7 times, lines 33–68, mostly spelled "inûma"). In the Amarna letters, Akkadaian enūma is used and spelled starting with either i, e, or a, thus inūma, enūma, or anūma, all for Akkadian language "enūma". The usage is probably specific to the scribe, as the writer of the letter (not necessarily the 'author' of the letter).

Akkadian language "eninna", (English "now") is used far less in the Amarna letters. Anūma, enūma, and inūma is the common adverb, for now, or when, (now, ("now, at this time", as the segue)).
