= Ši =

Cuneiform sign

Cuneiform ši. (~Babylonian form)

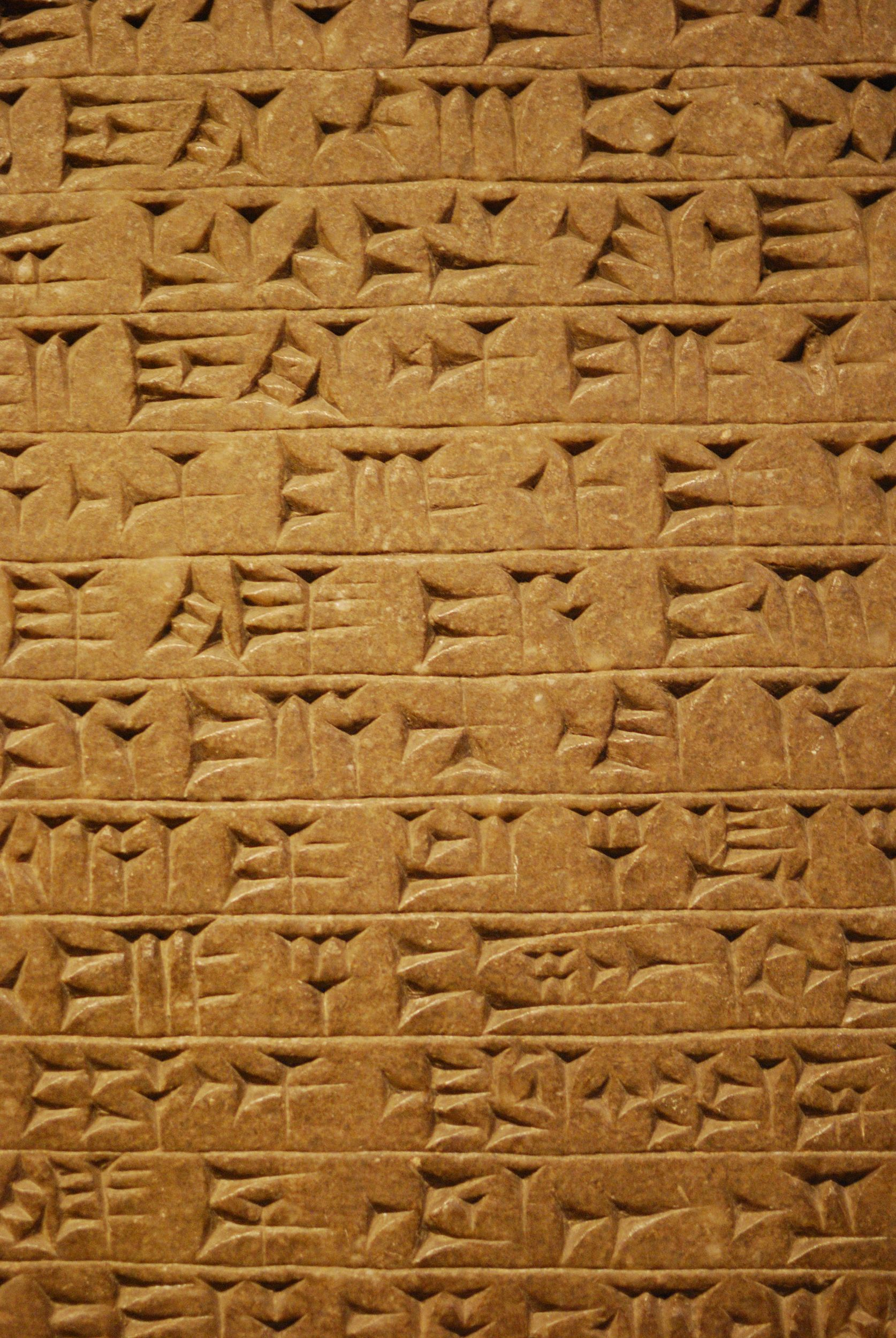
Cuneiform š, lim, or IGI at the British Museum-(line 3 & 4).

The cuneiform sign ši, lim, and Sumerogram IGI is a common-use sign of the Amarna letters, the Epic of Gilgamesh, and other cuneiform texts. As the syllabic form it is commonly used for ši, lim/lem, and for Sumerograms (capital letter majuscules), it is most commonly used for IGI (Akkadian language pānu, for English language "face", "presence"), and (with prep.) "before". Also, for ši and lim/lem it can be used syllabically for š, i, l, i/e, and m, in the spelling of words.

== Epic of Gilgamesh usage ==
The ši sign usage in the Epic of Gilgamesh is as follows: lem-(2) times, lim-(25), ši-(299), IGI-(15), ŠI-(1) time.
