= Sumerogram =

Use of Sumerian cuneiform

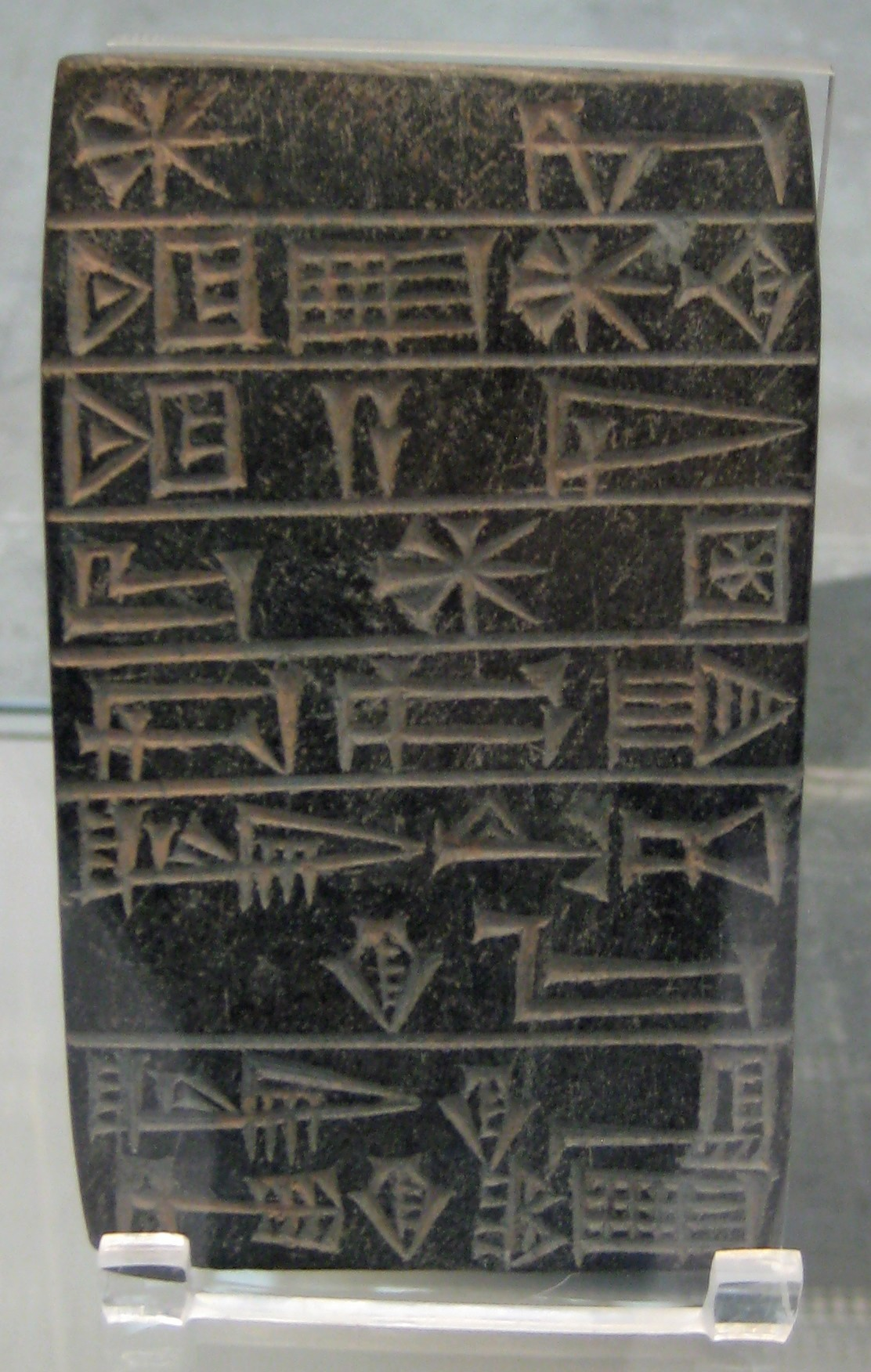
Foundation tablet from the Temple of Inanna at Uruk, dating to the reign of Ur-Nammu, featuring the Sumerogram 𒈗 (LUGAL) on the left of the last two rows.

A Sumerogram is the use of a Sumerian cuneiform character or group of characters as an ideogram or logogram rather than a syllabogram in the graphic representation of a language other than Sumerian, such as Akkadian, Eblaite, or Hittite. This type of logogram characterized, to a greater or lesser extent, every adaptation of the original Mesopotamian cuneiform system to a language other than Sumerian. The frequency and intensity of their use varied depending on period, style, and genre. In the same way, a written Akkadian word that is used ideographically to represent a language other than Akkadian (such as Hittite) is known as an Akkadogram.

In the transliteration of ancient texts Sumerograms are normally represented by majuscule letters. Most signs have a number of possible Sumerian sound values. The scribes and readers of texts using these Sumerograms would not necessarily have been aware of the Sumerian language, with the Sumerograms functioning as ideograms or logogram to be substituted in pronunciation by the intended word in the text's language, such as Akkadian.

== Transliteration and examples ==
In modern Assyriological convention, a cuneiform sign used in this way is transliterated according to its Sumerian pronunciation in non-italic majuscule letters with dots separating the signs. Determinatives appear only as superscripts. For example, the Babylonian name Marduk is written in Sumerograms, as ^{d}AMAR.UTU. Hittite Kurunta is usually written as 𒀭𒆗 (^{d}LAMMA), where LAMMA is the Sumerogram for 'stag', the Luwian deity Kurunta being associated with this animal.

In the Amarna letters, Lady of the Lions is the name of a Babylonian Queen mother, spelled as NIN.UR.MAH.MEŠ. While the meaning 'lady (NIN) of the lions' (UR.MAH.MEŠ) is evident, the intended pronunciation is Assyrian and must be conjectured from external evidence.

== See also ==
- Aramaeograms in Pahlavi scripts
- Heterograms
- Hittite cuneiform
- Sinograms in East Asian writing systems, including Hanja, Kanji, and Chữ Hán
