= Amarna letter EA 252 =

14th-century BCE Egyptian clay tablet

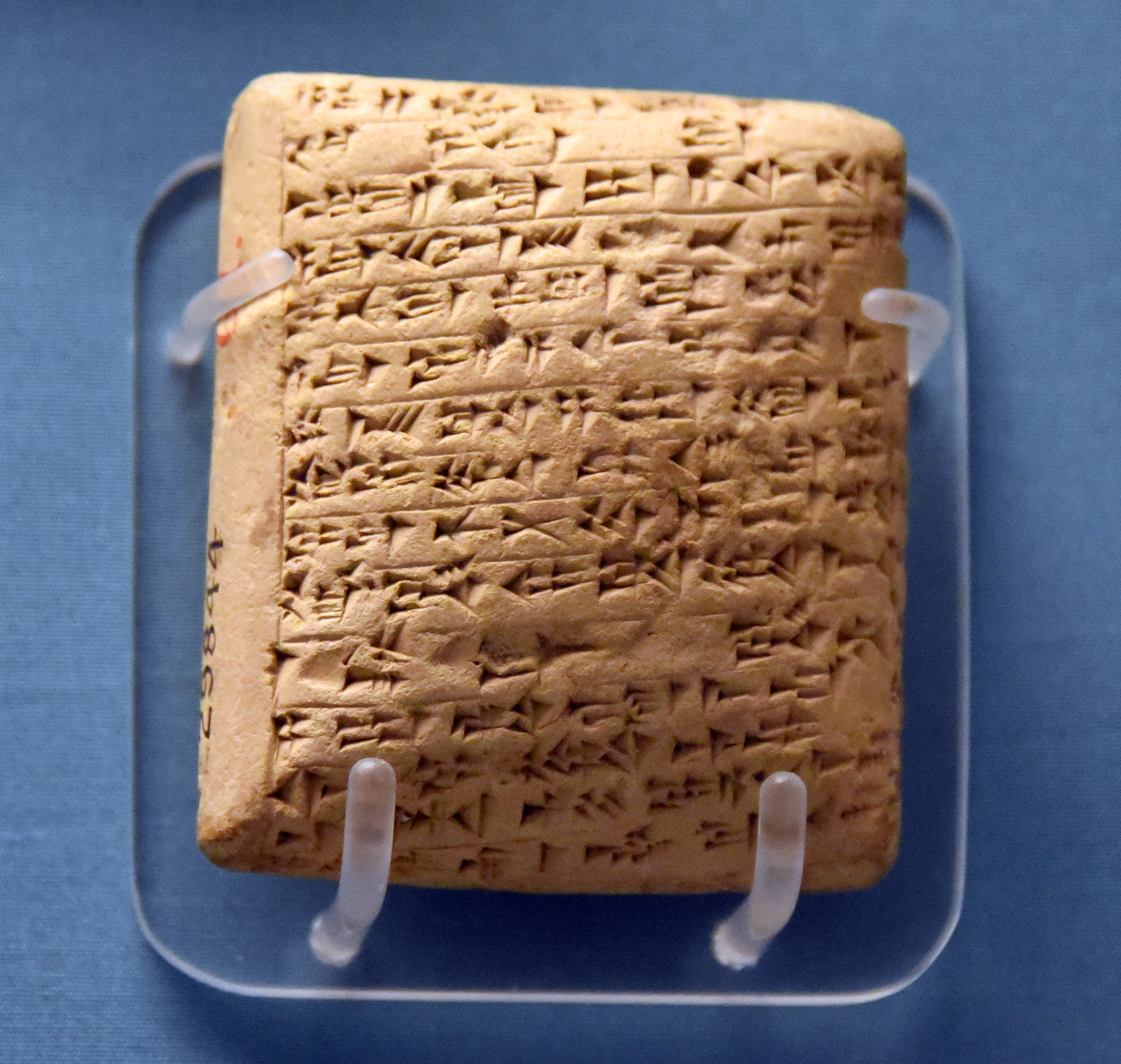
- Material: Clay
- Length: c. 5.7 cm
- Height: c. 7 cm
- Created: c. 1350 BC
- Present location: British Museum, England, United Kingdom
- Identification: E29844
- Language: Akkadian

Amarna letter EA 252, titled: Sparing One's Enemies, is a square, mostly flat clay tablet letter written on both sides, and the bottom edge. Each text line was written with a horizontal line scribed below the text line, as well as a vertical left margin-line, (beginning of text at left) scribe line on the obverse of the tablet. The letter contains 14 (15) lines on the obverse, continuing on the bottom tablet edge to conclude at line 31 on the reverse, leaving a small space before the final tablet edge. At least 4 lines from the obverse intrude into the text of the reverse (appearing as upside-down cuneiform into the text of the reverse), actually dividing the reverse into a top half and bottom half, and even creating a natural spacing segue to the reverse's text, and the story.

Letter EA 252 is authored by Labaya, by the 'Man, city-state' (of) Shechem, and written to the Pharaoh. The letter is letter one of three letters authored by him, to the Pharaoh. In the current List of Amarna letters by size, it is the smallest clay tablet letter, being only around 7 cm tall and around 5.7 cm long.

The Amarna letters, about 300, numbered up to EA 382, are a mid 14th century BC, about 1350 BC and 20–25 years later, correspondence. The initial corpus of letters were found at Amarna, in the floor of the Bureau of Correspondence of Pharaoh; others were later found, adding to the body of letters.

== Brief letter summary ==
The topic of the letter is Labaya's defense against other governors of city-states that he is engaged with. A town and statue were taken, and he defends his then follow-up actions of pursuit, to the pharaoh's commissioner. He states: "my parts are eaten/ I'm being slandered". The exact quote is "...he has slandered me, (and/ u), I am slandered-(ši-ir-ti)."

Directly next, an allegory, lines 16–19, follows concerning "a pinched ant-defending itself". Basically, if an ant is attacked, should it just sit quiet, or defend against the "hand of the man" that attacks? Labaya then explains his justification for pursuing the men in warfare (Akkadian nukurtu, nu-KÚR-te, (last syllable most variable in spellings)), and the events to follow.

== The letter ==
=== EA 252: "Sparing One's Enemies" ===
EA 252, letter one of three. (Not a linear, line-by-line translation, and English from French.) (Obverse only, Paragraphs I, ~II; about a 3-paragraph letter):

Obverse: (see here: )

(Lines 1-4)--Say to the king, my lord: Message of Labaya, your servant. I fall at the feet of the king, my lord.
(5-9)--As to your having written me, "Guard the men who seized the city;" how am I to guard (such) men? It was in war (nukurtu) the city was seized.
(10-15)--When I had sworn my peace—and when I swore the magnate swore with me—the city, along with my god, was seized. He has slandered me: gl (and) (ši-ir-ti) (I am slandered) before the king, my lord.
(16-22)--Moreover, when an ant is struck....

EA 252, Reverse: (Photo in Rohl)

(16-22)--Moreover, when an ant is struck, does it not fight back and bite the hand of the man that struck it? How at this time can I show deference and then another city of mine will be seized?
(23-31)--On the other hand, if you also order, "Fall down beneath them so they can strike you," I will d<o> (it). I will guard the men that seized the city (and) my god. They are the despoilers of my father, but I will guard them.-(!) --(complete EA 252, with no lacunae, lines 1-31)

== Akkadian text ==
The Akkadian text:

English:

(Line 1)--To "King-Lord-mine"
(2)--'speaking'
(3)--'message thus' 1. Labaya, SERVANT-yours
(4)--at feet(s)(pl.) "King-Lord-mine" I bow
(5)--Now, (you) messaged
(6)--to Me: "Guard!
(7)--men who en-sieged (the City)!"
(8)--"How to guard (the) Men, ...
(9)--..in conflict(warfare) en-sieged\ \"sworn" City?"
(10)--"How to swear peace? ..and.. How to swear, "sworn" City?"
(11)--"Commissioner(Man-Great) 'assigned with'-me
(12)--(the) captured, sworn City ! ?"
(13)--And, god(s) 'spoke/heard'
(14)--"(my) parts (are) eaten-mine" \ \ : (–gl–) "I AM SLANDERED"
(15)--before "The King", "Lord-Mine"

Akkadian:

(Line 1)--a-na "LUGAL-EN-ia"
(2)--qí-bil-ma
(3)--um-ma ^{I}La-aB-A-iYa ARAD-ka
(4)--a-na GÌR.MEŠ "LUGAL-be-lí-ia" am-qú-ut
(5)--i-nu-ma šap-ra-ta
(6)--a-na ia-a-ši ú-ṣur-me
(7)--LÚ.MEŠ ša ṣa-ab-tu URU
(8)-- ki-i uṣ-ṣur-ru-na LÚ.MEŠ
(9)--i-na nu-KÚR-te ṣa-ab-te at-me URU
(10)--ki it-mé ša-li-me u ki at-at-me URU
(11)--1. LUGAL.GAL it-ti-ia
(12)--ṣa-ab-ta at-me URU
(13)--ù i-li qa-bi
(14)--qa-ar-ṣí-ia : (–gl–) ši-ir-ti
(15)--i-na pa-ni "1. LUGAL-ma" "be-li-ia"

== Cuneiform score, Akkadian, English ==
Cuneiform score (per CDLI, Chicago Digital Library Initiative), and Akkadian, and English.

Obverse

Paragraph I, (lines 1-4)

1.(P. I of III)-a-na 1=diš ŠÀR bi-lí-ia
___ana 1=diš ŠÀR bēlu-ia
___To ^{m=male=diš}King Lord-mine
2.qí- -----bil- -----ma( !! )
___qabû — !!
___speaking — !!
3.um-ma 1=diš La-ab-a-ya ÀRAD-ka
___umma, – 1=diš La-ab-a-ya ÀRAD-ka
___"message thus", – ^{m=male=diš}Labaya, servant-yours
4.a-na _GÌRI-MEŠ_-pí (ŠÀR) be-lí-ia am-qú-ut
___ana _GÌRI-MEŠ_-pí (ŠÀR) Bēlu-ia, — maqātu — !
___at (the) feet^{pl.}, – (King), Lord-mine, — I bow — !

Paragraph II, (lines 5-15)

5.(P. II of III)-i-nu-ma šap-ra-ta
___enūma, – šapāru
___Now(at this time), – (you) messaged(wrote):
6.a-na ia-a-ši ú-ṣur-mì
___ana iāši, — ^{Quote}naṣāru — !! —
___to Me, — ^{Quote}En-Guard — !! —
7. _LÚ-MEŠ_ ša ṣa-ab-tu _IRI_
___ _LÚ-MEŠ_(amēlu)^{pl.} ša ṣabātu _URU_ — ? ^{EndQuote}
___(the) men^{pl.} which en-sieged (the) town — ? ^{EndQuote}

segue
8.ki-i uṣ-ṣur-ru-na _LÚ-MEŠ_
___^{Quote}kī naṣāru
___ ^{Quote}How to guard (the) men^{pl.} —,
9.i-na nu-KÚR-ti_{7} ṣa-ab-ta at-mì _IRI_
___ina nukurtu ṣabātu tamû _URU_ — ?^{EndQuote}
___ in warfare en-sieged (sworn-to) town — ?^{EndQuote}

segue
10.ki it-mi ša-li-mì ù ki it-mì it-ta#-mì
___ ^{Quote-#2}kī tamû šalāmu
___ ^{Quote-#2}How to swear peace
10.6--------------ù ki it-mì it-ta#-mì ((IRI))
___-----------------u kī tamû ta#mû (_URU_) — ?
___-----------------and how "to swear" "sworn-to" (town) — ?
11. 1=(diš)- -----LÚ-GAL- -----it-ti-ia ( !! )
___ ((that))(ša), – 1=(diš)-LÚ-GAL itti--ia – ?
___ ((that)), – (the) ^{m=male=diš}-Commissioner (assigned) with-Me – ?
12.ṣa-ab-ta-at-mì _IRI_
___ṣabātu tamû _URU_ — ! ?^{EndQuote}
___(the) captured sworn-to _town_ — ! ?^{EndQuote-#2}

segue
13.Ù i-li qa-bi
___U, – ilu qabû – :
___And, – (the)-god spoke – :
14.qa-ar-ṣí-ia : (–gl–) ši-ir-ti
___^{Quote}qa-ar-ṣí-ia : (–gl–) ši-ir-ti
___^{Quote}"My parts are eaten"(intestines, insides)-mine : (–gl–) "I am slandered – !"
15.i-na pa-ni-ma be-li-ia
___ina pānu(="face") Bēlu-ia — !^{EndQuote}
___"before", (my)-Lord-mine — !^{EndQuote}

Paragraph III, (lines 16-31)

16.(P. III)-Ša-ni-tam ki-i na-am-lu
___Šanitam, – kī namlu
___Furthermore, – when ants
17.tu-um-ha-ṣú la-a
___tu-um-ha-ṣú, — lā
___are squeezed, —
17.7--------------la-a
___----------------lā
___----------------(they) do not

Reverse

18.ti-qá-bi-lu ------ ù ta-an-šu-ku
___qabû — !
___(just)(speak) yell — !
18.5-------------ù ta-an-šu-ku
___----------------u našāku — !
___----------------but bite — !
19.qà-ti _LÚ_-lì ša yi-ma-ha-aš-ši
___qātu _LÚ_ ša mahāṣu — !
___(the) HAND, _MAN_, that attacks — !
20.kī a-na-ku i-ša-ha-tu
___^{Quote}kī anāku i-ša-ha-tu
___ ^{Quote}How (can) I "abide time"
21.ú-ma-an-nu-tú ù
___ú-ma-an-nu-tú —
___day this ("at this time"), —
21.8-------------ù
___----------------u
___----------------and-(with)
22.ṣa-ab-ta-at-mì 2-(diš _IRI_-ia
___ṣabātu–at-mì(tamû) 2-(diš_ _URU_-ia—! ?^{EndQuote}
___seizing (of)–(sworn) 2 cities-mine—! ?^{EndQuote}

segue
23.Ša-ni-tam šum-ma ti-qa-bu
___Šanitam, — šumma qabû
___Furthermore, — when(if) (you) say
24.ap-pu-na-ma
___ap-pu-na-ma (pānu, ?come face)
___^{Quote}"come forward" ((and))
25.nu-pu-ul-mì
___napālu — !
___Demolish — !
26.ṭe-ah-ta-mu ù
___ṭehû u
___approach and
27.ti-ma-ha-ṣú-ka
___mahāṣu, — !
___attack, — !
28.i-pé-<šu>-ú-ṣur-ru-na
29.LÚ-meš ša ṣa-ab-tu_{4} _IRI_ <ù>
___LÚ^{meš} ṣabātu URU
___(the) men^{pl.} who en-sieged (the) town^{UnQuote}

segue
30.i-li šu-ṣú-mì a-bi-ia
___ilu, — ezēzu abu-ia
___[(the) god(s) ((listened))], — defilers (of) Father-mine
31.ù ú-ṣur-ru : (–gl–) šu-nu
___u, – ezēru : (–gl–) šunu(=them) — !
___and, – I curse them — !

== See also ==
- Glossenkeil (Amarna letters)
- Amarna letters–phrases and quotations
- Cuneiform-bil (in line 2, Obverse)
- List of Amarna letters by size
  - Amarna letter EA 5, EA 9, EA 15, EA 19, EA 26, EA 27, EA 35, EA 38
  - EA 153, EA 161, EA 288, EA 364, EA 365, EA 367

== Ext links ==
- Line drawing, Obverse & Reverse
- EA 252, CDLI (Chicago Digital Library Initiative)
- CDLI listing of all EA Amarna letters, 1-382
- British Museum site for EA 252, Dimensions, 2.75 in (ht), 2.25 in (width)
