= Amarna letter EA 256 =

Egyptian correspondence on a clay tablet

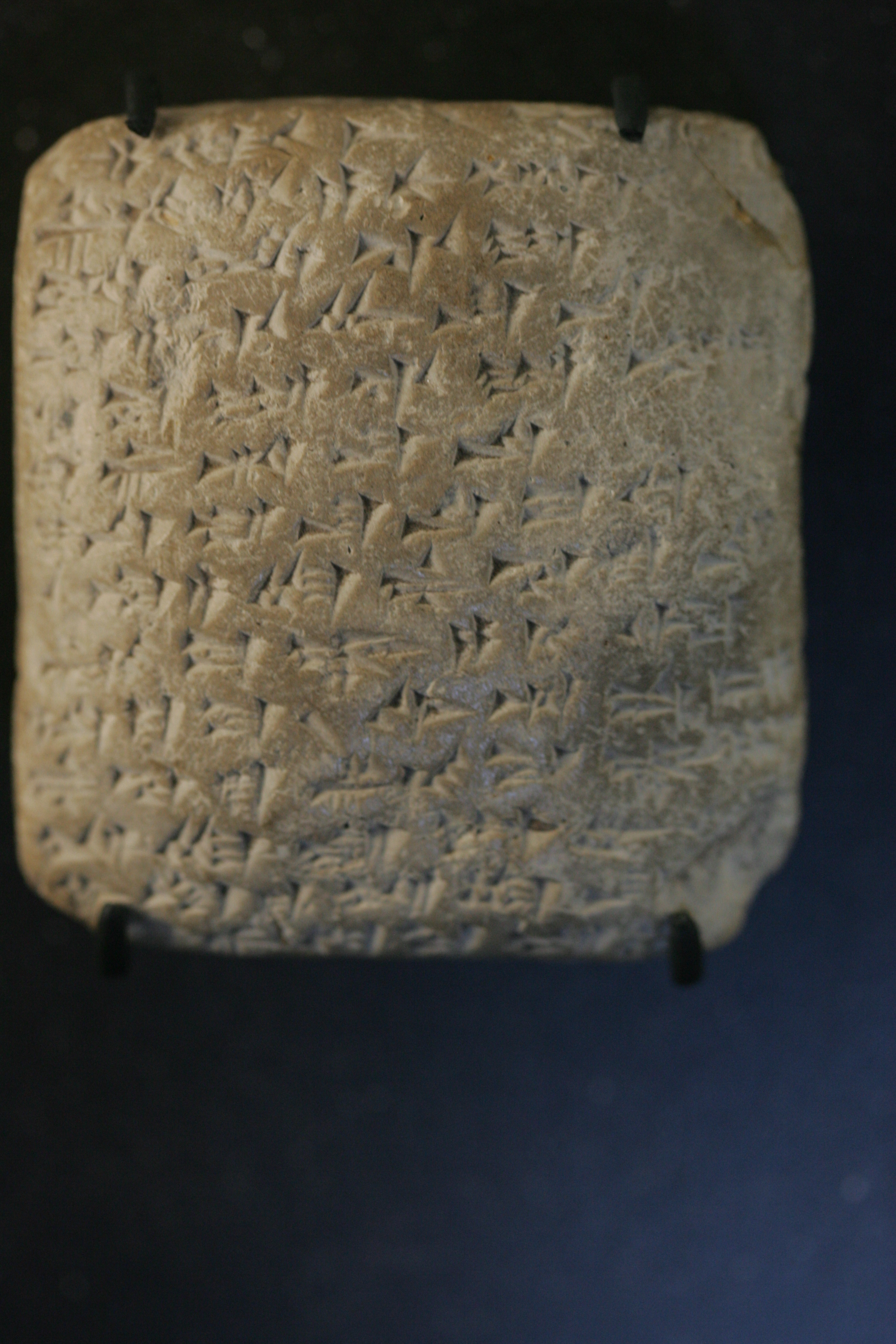
EA 365, a rectangular letter of similar size to Mut-Bahlu's EA 256 (very high-resolution expandable photo)

Amarna letter EA 256, in short EA 256, catalogued under the title Oaths and Denials, is one of a total of about 350 so-called Amarna letters, belonging to an official correspondence dating to the mid-14th century BC (about 1350 BC till 20–25 years later). The initial corpus of letters were found at Akhenaten's city Akhetaten, on the floor of the Bureau of Correspondence of Pharaoh; others were later found, adding to the body of letters.

== Description ==
EA 256 is a square, mostly flat clay tablet letter written on both sides; it is also written on the bottom, top (=bottom of reverse side), and the last 3 lines are written on the left edge (obverse), where the start of lines on the obverse form a 'straight' margin.

The reverse of the letter (see Rohl), has a list of towns in, or associated with the Golan Heights. The surface of the letter is rough (partially eroded?), or photos of the reverse especially, do not easily highlight the cuneiform characters.

The topic of the letter is the whereabouts of Ayyab, supposedly in Pella, Jordan (Pihilu of the letters).

Each text line was written with a horizontal line scribed below the text line, as well as a vertical left margin-line, (beginning of text at left) scribe line on the obverse of the tablet. The letter contains 14 (15) lines on the obverse, continuing on the bottom tablet edge to conclude at line 31 on the reverse, leaving a small space before the final tablet edge. At least 4 lines from the obverse intrude into the text of the reverse (appearing as upside-down cuneiform into the text of the reverse), actually dividing the reverse into a top half and bottom half, and even creating a natural spacing segue to the reverse's text, and the story.

== Brief letter summary ==
Letter EA 256 is authored by Mutbaal, the son of Labaya, and written to the Pharaoh.

== The letter ==
=== Translation ===
EA 252, letter two of two. (Not a linear, line-by-line translation, and English from French.)

Obverse:

(Lines 1-4)--Say to Yanhamu, my lord: Message of Mut-Bahlu, your servant. I fall at the feet of my lord.
(4.3-10)--How can it have been said in your presence,^{1} "Mut-Bahlu has fled. He has hidden Ayyab?" How can the king of Pihilu flee from the commissioner: sú-ki-ni of the king, his lord?
(10)--(As)-The King, Lord, Him – Lives! ("The Living)
(11)--(As)-The King, Lord, Mine – Lives! ("The Living)
(12)--The King, Lord, Mine – "If 'to come to shame', .."

(10-19)--As the king, my lord, lives, as the king, my lord, lives, I swear Ayyab is not in Pihilu. In fact, he h[as been in the fie]ld^{2} for two months. Just ask Ben-Elima. Just ask Tadua.

Reverse: (starts at lines 18–19)

(19-28)--Just ask Yišuya whether, after he [ro]bbed Šulum-Marduk, I went to the aid of Aštartu, when all the cities of Garu(Golan Heights) had become hostile: Udumu, Aduru, Araru, Mešta, Magdalu, Heni-anabi, Sarqu.^{3} (Hayyanu, along with Yabiluma, has been captured.)^{4}
(29-35)--Moreover, seeing that, after you sent me a tablet, I wrote to him — before you arrive from your journey, he will surely have arrived in Pihilu. And – I do obey [your] orders.^{5}--(complete, Obverse & Reverse, lines 1-35)

=== Akkadian text ===
The Akkadian language text:

Obverse:

(Line 1)--A-na 1.-^{diš} iYa-Na-Ha-Me,.. EN-ia,..--(To Yanhamu,..Lord-mine,.. )
(2)--qí-bí-ma,.. um-ma 1.-^{diš} Mu-uT-Bahlu --(..'speaking',.. "Message" 1.-Mut-Bahlu-(1.-Mut-^{d}IŠKUR))
(3)--ARAD-ka,.. ana 2.-^{diš}GÌR.MEŠ,.. EN-ia,.. --(..Servant-yours,.. at 2-feet(pl),.. Lord-mine,.. )
(4)--am-qut!... --(..I bow-(down)!... )

segue
(4.3)--Ki-i qa-bi-ma, --(..How "can (it) be said", )
(5)--i-na pa-ni-ka:.. ^{Quote} 1.-^{diš} Mu-uT-Bahlu-mì,--(.."in your presence":.. ^{Quote} 1.-Mut-Bahlu, )
(6)--in-né-bi-it 1.-^{diš} A-iYa-aB(Ayyab)?...^{Unquote} --(.."has hidden",.. Ayyab?...^{Unquote} )
(7)--:-Gloss: hi-ih-bé-e ki-i in_{4}-né-bi-tu
(8)--LUGAL,.. ^{URU}Pí-Hi-Lì,.. ištu,..--(..King,.. ^{City}Pihilu,.. from,.. )
(9)--pa-ni LÚ.MEŠ,.. ra-bi-ṣí,.. :-Gloss: sú-ki-ni--(..Before men(pl),.. commissioner(s),.. :-Gloss: ["The Prefect"]!... )

segue
(10)--LUGAL-EN-šu,.. li-ib-lu-ut--(..King-Lord-Him!.. "The Living"!... )
(11)--LUGAL-EN-ia,.. li-ib-lu-ut--(..King-Lord-Mine!.. "The Living"!... )
(12)--LUGAL-EN-ia,.. šum-ma I_{15}-ba-ši--(..King-Lord-Mine!.. If,.. "to come To Shame"!... )

(Line 1)--(Ana Yanhamu,.. ^{EN}Bēlu-ia,.. )
(2)--(qabû,.. umma Mut-Bahlu,.. )
(3)--(..ardu-ka,.. ana 2.-šēpu,.. ^{EN}Bēlu-ia,.. )
(4)--(maqātu!... )

segue
(4.3)--(kî "qabû," )
(5)--(.."ina pānu":.. ^{Quote}1.-Mut-Bahlu, )
(6)--(in-né-bi-it 1.-Ayyab?...^{Unquote} )
(7)--(:-Gloss: hi-ih-bé-e kî in_{4}-né-bi-tu )
(8)--(...King,.. ^{City}Pihilu,.. from,.. )
(9)--(..pānu Men(pl),.. Rābiṣu,.. :-Gloss: Sakānu!... )

segue
(10)--(..LUGAL-ri(ŠÀR-ri/(Šarru)) ^{EN}Bēlu-šu balāṭu!.. )
(11)--(..LUGAL-ru((ŠÀR-ru)) ^{EN}Bēlu-ia balāṭu!.. )
(12)--(..LUGAL-ru((Šarru)) ^{EN}Bēlu-ia!... Šumma,.. bâšu!.. ... )

== See also ==
- Ayyab
- Pella, Jordan
- Yanhamu
- Amarna letters–phrases and quotations
