= Amarna letter EA 144 =

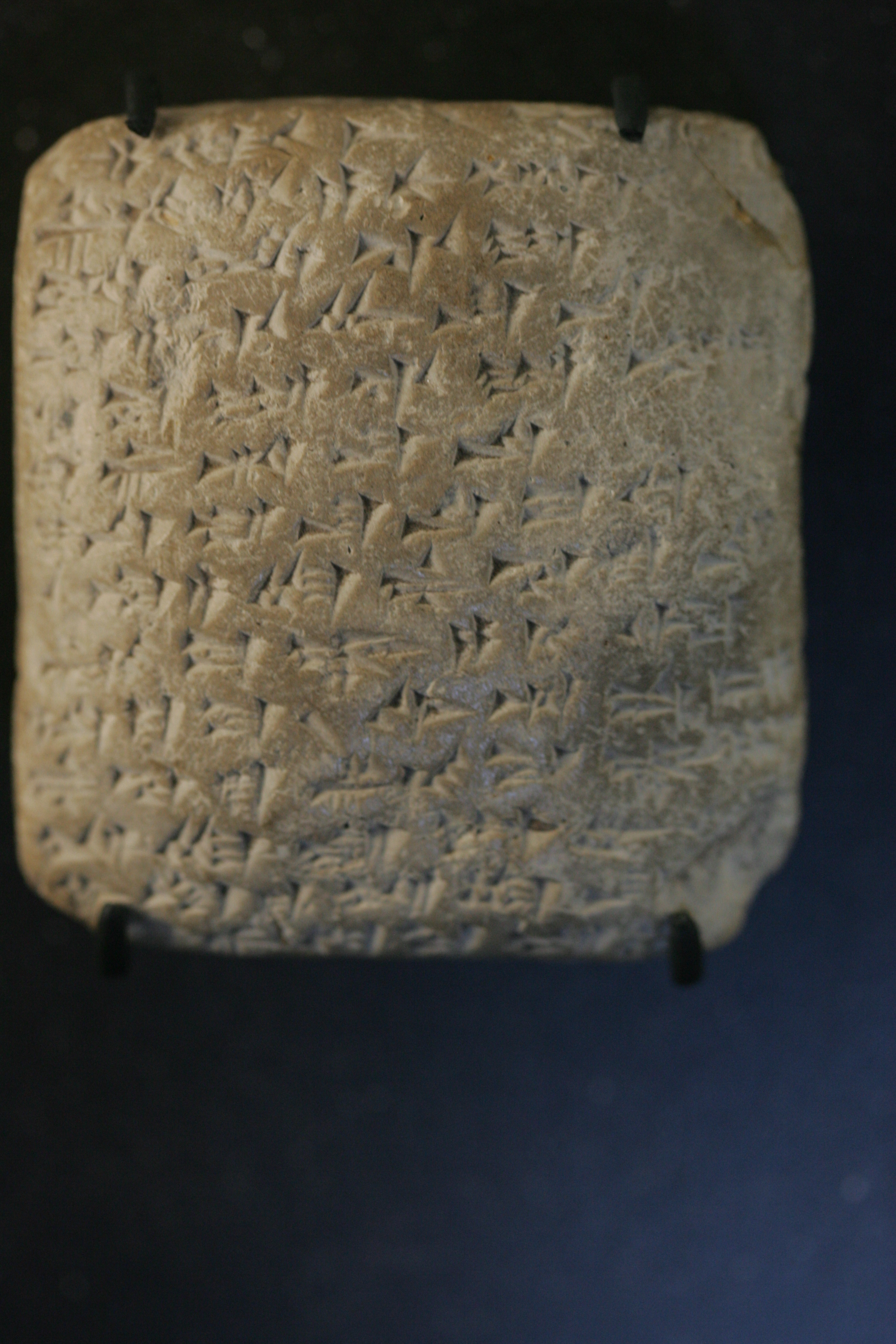
EA 365, an approximate equivalent-sized Amarna letter (dramatically different in style). (very high-resolution expandable photo)

Amarna letter EA 144, titled: "Zimreddi of Sidon," is a square-shaped, mostly flat clay tablet letter written on both sides and the bottom edge. It is from a vassal state in Canaan (city-state Sidon), and is written by the 'mayor' of Sidon, the author of Amarna letter EA 144, and Amarna letter EA 145. Zimreddi is also referred to in a few other Amarna letters.

The letter is in a crude cuneiform style, but in nearly perfect condition (few lacunas). It is in a similar style of many of the Canaanite city letters showing subservience to the Pharaoh (King). The letter is approximately 4 in wide x 3.5 in tall.

The Amarna letters, about 300, numbered up to EA 382, are a mid-14th century BC, about 1350 BC and 20–25 years later, correspondence. The initial corpus of letters were found at Akhenaten's city Akhetaten, in the floor of the Bureau of Correspondence of Pharaoh; others were later found, adding to the body of letters.

Letter EA 144 (see here [*EA 144: Obverse, bottom edge, Reverse, CDLI no. 271185 (Chicago Digital Library Initiative)]), is numbered VAT 00323, from the Vorderasiatisches Museum Berlin.

== The letter ==
=== EA 144: "Zimreddi of Sidon" ===
EA 144, letter one? of two. (Not a linear, line-by-line translation, and English from French.) (Obverse & Reverse):

(Lines 1-5)--Say to the king, my lord, my god, my Sun, the breath of my life: Thus^{1} Zimreddi, the mayor of Sidon.
(6-12)--I fall at the feet of my lord, god, Sun, breath of my life ((at the feet of my lord, my god, my Sun, the breath of my life)) 7 times and 7 times. May the king, my lord, know that Sidon, the maidservant of the king, my lord, which he put in my charge, is safe and sound.
(13-21)--And when I heard the words of the king, my lord, when he wrote to his servant, then my heart rejoiced, and my head went [h]igh, and my eyes shone, at hearing the word of the king, my lord. May the king know that I have made preparations^{2} before the arrival of the archers of the king, my lord. I have prepared everything in accordance with the command of the king, my lord.
(22-30)--May the king, my lord, know that the war against me is very severe. All the cit[i]es that the king put in [m]y ch[ar]ge, have been joined to the 'Ap[ir]u. May the king put me in the charge of a man that will lead the archers of the king to call to account the cities that have been joined to the 'Apiru, so you can restore^{3} them to my charge that I may be able to serve the king, my lord, as our ancestors (did) before.--(complete EA 144, only minor, restored lacunae, lines 1-30)

== Akkadian text ==
The Akkadian language text: (through line 12, obverse)

Akkadian:

(Line 1)--a-na LUGAL-ri EN-ia—(To King-Lord-mine...)
(2)--dingir-meš-ia (d)utu-ia sza-ri til-la-ia—((of) god(pl)-mine, Sun-god-mine (which of) 'breath-of-life')
(3)--qí-bí-ma—(speak(-ing)!...)
(4)--um-ma 1. Zi-iM-Re-eD-Di—('message thus' 1.-Zimreddi,...)

(5)--LÚ ha-za-nu ša ^{URU} Sí-Du-Na-^{ki}—(man-(mayor-governor) ^{city}-Siduna), (Sídōn)
(6)--a-na GÌR-MEŠ EN-ia, dingir-meš (d)utu sza-ri—(at feet(pl), Lord-mine, (which of) gods(pl), Sun-god, King)
(7)--ša til-la-ia a-na GÌR-MEŠ EN-ia—((which of) breath-of-life, at feet(pl), my Lord)
(8)--dingir-meš-ia (d)utu-ia sza-ri til-la-ia—((of) god(pl)-mine, Sun-god-mine, King, 'breath-of-life')
(9)--7-šu ù 7-ta-a-an am-qú-ut—(7 times and 7 times (again)...--...I bow(-ing))(am bowing)
(10)--lu-ú i-de LUGAL EN-ia i-nu-ma—(may it be!..Know! King-Lord-mine...--...Now-(Now, at-this-time))
(11)--šal-ma-at ^{URU} Sí-Du-Na-^{ki} geme2-ti—((there is) Peace, ^{city}-Siduna^{his},..."maidservant")
(12)--LUGAL EN-ia sza i-din i-na qa-ti-ia

== See also ==
- Zimredda (Sidon mayor)
- Amarna letters–phrases and quotations
