= Lady of the Lions =

Mesopotamian writer

NIN-UR.MAH.MEŠ (𒎏𒌨𒈤𒎌 Akkadian: Bēltu-nēšēti; fl. c. 1350 BC), or the "Lady" of the Lions, was the author of two letters to the pharaoh, the King of Ancient Egypt, in the 1350–1335 BC Amarna letters correspondence. Her name is a representation of the original written script characters of Babylonian 'Sumerograms' , "NIN- + UR.MAH + (plural:MEŠ)", and means, "woman–lion–plural", namely: "Lady (of the) Lions". (See: NIN for "lady"). The Amarna letters are mostly written in Akkadian cuneiform, with local words/phrases/etc due to various city-states or countries.

The name or location of her city/city-state are not stated in her letter. Generally, she is theorized to have been a ruler of Beit Shemesh.

Also called "Mistress of the Lionesses", she was a female "king" who may have ruled Beit Shemesh around 1350 BC.

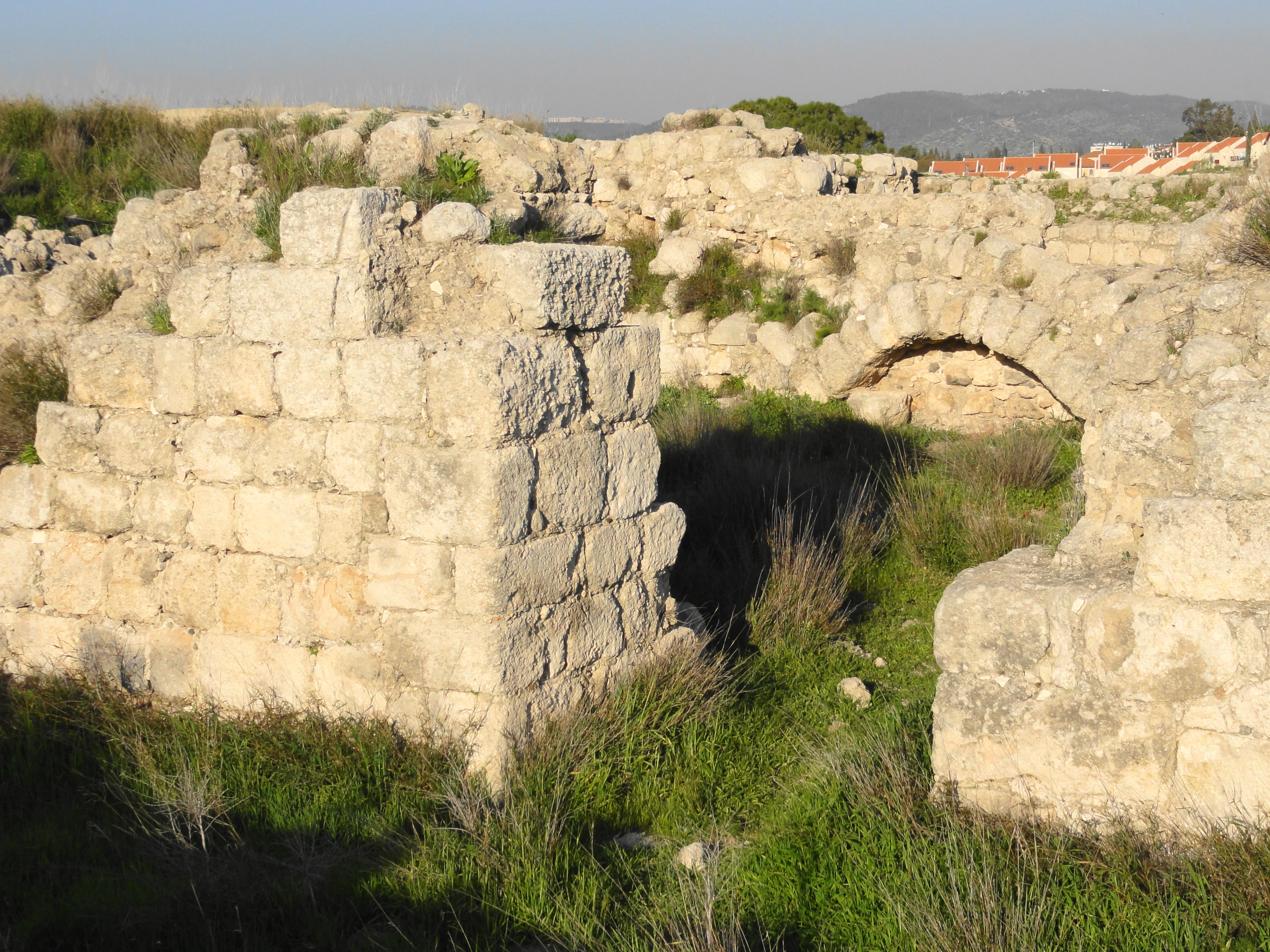
Remains of walls at Beit Shemesh

== The two Amarna letters ==
The two letters by the 'Queen Mother', (of her unnamed location), are both minimally short and concise EA letters (26 lines and 19 lines) and are topically about the takeover of regional cities, by the attacking bands of people: the Hapiru, (EA for 'el Amarna').

=== EA 273: "From a queen mother" ===
Say to the king-(i.e. pharaoh), my lord, my god, my Sun: Message of ^{f}NIN-UR.MAH.MEŠ, your handmaid. I fall at the feet of the king, my lord, 7 times and 7 times. May the king, my lord, know that war has been waged in the land, and gone is the land of the king, my lord, by desertion to the 'Apiru. May the king, my lord, take cognizance of his land, and may the [k]ing, my lord, kn[ow] tha[t] the 'Apiru wrote to Ayyaluna and to Sarha, and the two sons of Milkilu barely escaped being killed. May the king, my lord, know of this deed. —EA 273, lines 1–26 (complete)

=== EA 274: "Another city lost" ===
Say to the king, my lord, my god, my Sun: Message of ^{f}NIN-UR.MAH.MEŠ, your handmaid, the dirt at your feet. I fall at the feet of the king, my lord, 7 times and 7 times. May the king, my lord, save his land from the power of the 'Apiru..–lest it be lost. Sapuma has been take[n]. For the information of the king, my lord. —EA 274, lines 1–19 (complete)

=== EA 273, Obverse, lines 1–9 (Akkadian language and English) ===
From the photo of Amarna letter EA 273, the Akkadian language of some of the important words, line-by-line: (Obverse, first 2/3rds, lines 1–9+)

Akkadian:

(Line 1) "Ana, 1 LUGAL-(=Šarru), EN-(="bēlu", Lord)-ia,
(2) ^{D}-MEŠ-ia ^{D}-UTU-ia
(3) qí-bil-ma (qabû)
(4) umma MÍ-(DAM=NIN?)-NIN.UR.MAH.MEŠ
(5) ARAD-ka ana GÌR-MEŠ Lugal-
(6) -EN-ia ^{D}-MEŠ-ia ^{D}-UTU-ia
(7) 7-šu-7, ta-a-an, am-qut-! (maqātu!)

(8) (pi)/yi-di-! (Akkadian: idû, "know") Lugal-be-li
(9) i-nu-ma nu-KÚR-tu, ...."

English:

(Line 1) "To, "KING-(Pharaoh)-Lord-mine",
(2) (of)-My God(s), My Sun,
(3) Speaking
(4) Message-(Quote) ^{F}-DAM (=NIN), ^{F}-NIN.UR.MAH.MEŠ
(5) Servant (Handmaid)-yours at (the) feet "King-
(6) -Lord-mine", My God, My Sun,
(7) '7-and-7-times, again', I bow down!

(8) Know-!, "King-Lord",
(9) Now ("now at this time") 'hostilities' ...."

== See also ==
- Milkilu, ruler of Gazru-(Gezer)

== Bibliography ==
- Moran, William L. The Amarna Letters. Johns Hopkins University Press, 1987, 1992. (softcover, ISBN 0-8018-6715-0)
- Parpola, 1971. The Standard Babylonian Epic of Gilgamesh, Parpola, Simo, Neo-Assyrian Text Corpus Project, c 1997, Tablet I thru Tablet XII, Index of Names, Sign List, and Glossary-(pp. 119–145), 165 pages.
