= Amarna letter EA 270 =

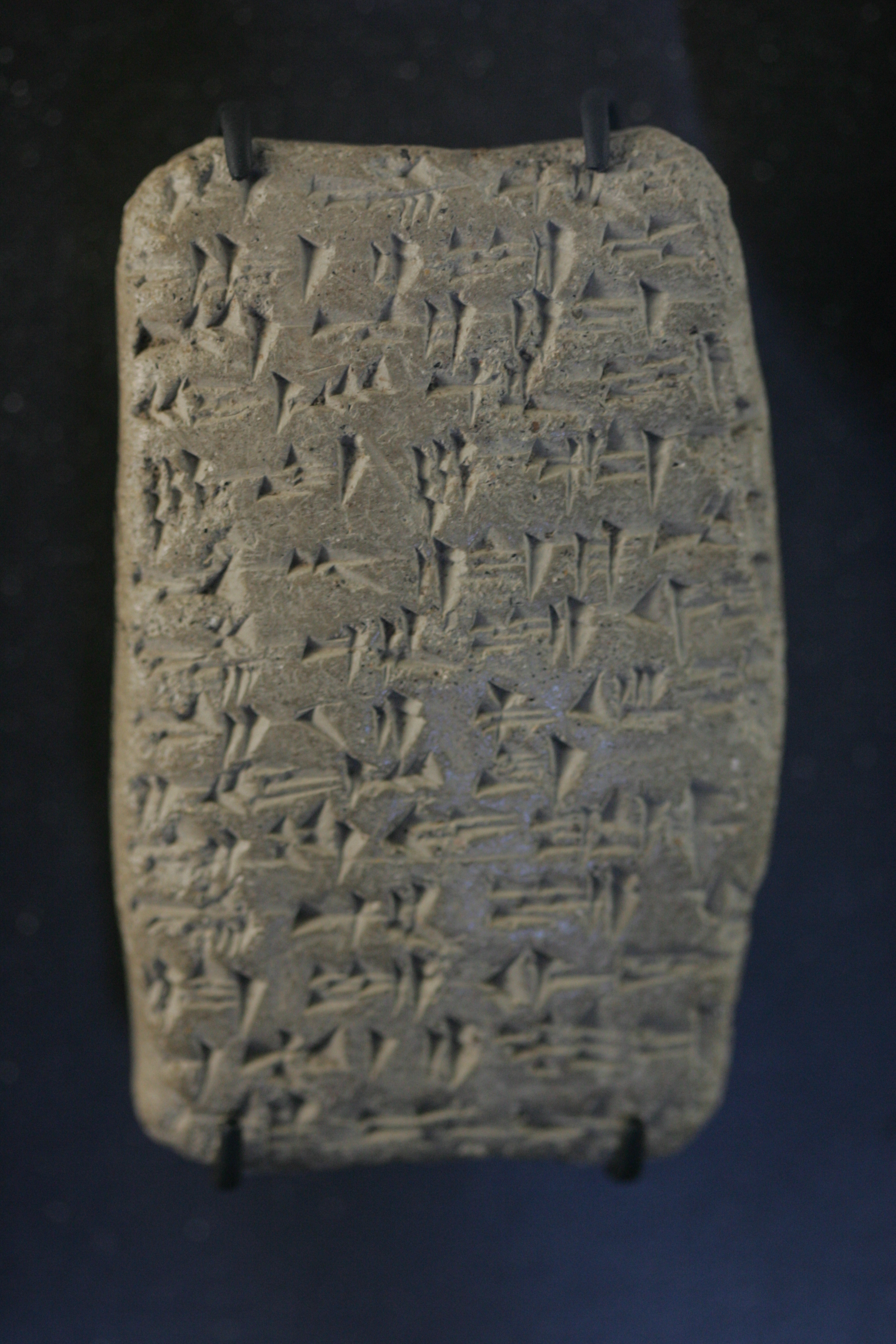
EA 364, from Ayyab, equivalent-sized Amarna letter (dramatically different in style). (very high-resolution expandable photo)

Amarna letter EA 270, titled: "Extortion," is an ovate-shaped, medium-sized, tall letter, approximately 3 in wide x 4 in tall, from Milkilu the mayor/ruler of Gazru (Gezer), of the mid 14th century BC Amarna letters.

The Canaanite city-states were visited by the scribes, with short 'status reports' sent to the Pharaoh (King) reporting on city or regional accounts, for example the troubles with the habiru, or other external affairs. Many of the Canaanite letters are short, with some nearly identical phraseology of words, as well as the layout of the individual clay tablet letters. Milkilu authored EA 268 through EA 271. Amarna letter EA 270-(29 lines) is nearly identical in shape to EA 271-(27 lines), with the beginning lines of the obverse, nearly identical in wording, and spacing.

The Amarna letters, about 300, numbered up to EA 382, are a mid 14th century BC, about 1350 BC and 20–25 years later, correspondence. The initial corpus of letters were found at Akhenaten's city Akhetaten, in the floor of the Bureau of Correspondence of Pharaoh; others were later found, adding to the body of letters.

Letter EA 270 (see here: 1–Photo (Obverse & Reverse): , 2–Line art, etc.), is numbered BM 29845, from the British Museum.

== The letter ==
=== EA 270: "Extortion" ===
EA 270, letter four of five. (Not a linear, line-by-line translation, and English from French.) (Obverse & Reverse):

Lines 1-8)--Say to the king, my lord, my god, my Sun: Message of Milkilu, your servant, the dirt at your feet. I fall at the feet of the king, my lord, my god, my Sun, 7 times and 7 times.
(9-16)--May the king, my lord, know the deeds that Yanhamu keeps doing to me since I left the king, my lord.
(17-21)--He indeed wants 2000 shekels of silver from me, and he says to me, "Hand ov[er]^{1} your wife and your sons, or I will kill (you)."
(22-29)--May the king know of this deed, and may the king, my lord, send chariots and fetch me to himself lest I perish.--(complete EA 270, only minor, restored lacunae, lines 1-29)-->

== Akkadian text ==
The Akkadian language text: (obverse & reverse)

Akkadian:

(Line 1)--a-na 1(disz)-LUGAL EN-ia—(To King-Lord-mine...)
(2)--dingir-meš-ia (d)UTU-ia—((of) gods(pl)-mine, Sun-god-mine)
(3)--qí-bí-ma—(speak(-ing)!...)
(4)--um-ma 1. MiL-Ki-Li, ARAD-ka—('message thus' 1. Milkilu, Servant-yours...)
(5)--ep-ri ša GÌR-MEŠ-ka—(dirt [which at] feet(pl)-yours)
(6)--a-na GÌR-MEŠ LUGAL EN-ia—(at feet(pl), King-Lord-mine)
(7)--dingir-meš-ia (d)UTU-ia—((of) gods(pl)-mine, Sun-god-mine)
(8)--7-šu ù 7-tá-a-an am-qut—(7 times and 7 times (again)...--...I bow(-ing))(am bowing)
(9)--yi-de LUGAL be-li—(Know!...King-Lord)
(10)--ip-ši ša yi-pu-šu-ni—
(11)--1. iYa-aN-Ha-Ma—(1. YaN-HaMu)
(12)--iš-tu a-sé-ia
(13)--iš#-tu-mu-hi LUGAL EN-ia—(To King-Lord-mine...)
(14)--a#-nu-ma yu-ba-ú#
(15)--2 li-im kù-BABBAR#—(2000 shekels silver)

Reverse

(16)--iš-tu qa-ti-ia—(from hand)
(17)--ù yi-iq-bu—(and Say:...)
(18)--a-na ia-ši id-na-mi#—(to me, alone)
(19)--DAM-ka ù—(Wife-yours, and)
(20)--DUMU-MEŠ-ka ù lu-ú—(Sons(pl)-yours, and... may it be...)
(21)--i-ma-ha-ṣa ù lu-ú—("I Strike Down!"... and... may it be...)
(22)--yi-de LUGAL—(Know!...King...)
(23)--ip-ša an-na-am—(make...this)
(24)--ù lu-ú yu-uš-ši-ra—(and,..may it be [you] send(issue))
(25)--LUGAL-be-li—(King...Lord)
(26)--GIŠ-GIGIR-MEŠ(Chariots) ù lu-ú—(Chariots(pl)... and may it be)
(27)--yi-ìl-te-qé-ni—("fetch"(check or test))
(28)--a-na mu-hi-šu la-a—(to himself ((and)) NOT...)
(29)--ih-la-aq—(die! (disappear))

== See also ==
- Milkilu
- Amarna letter EA 271
- Amarna letters–phrases and quotations
