= KÚR =

Cuneiform sign

Cuneiform sign for KÚR, from the Amarna letters, and minor usage in Epic of Gilgamesh.

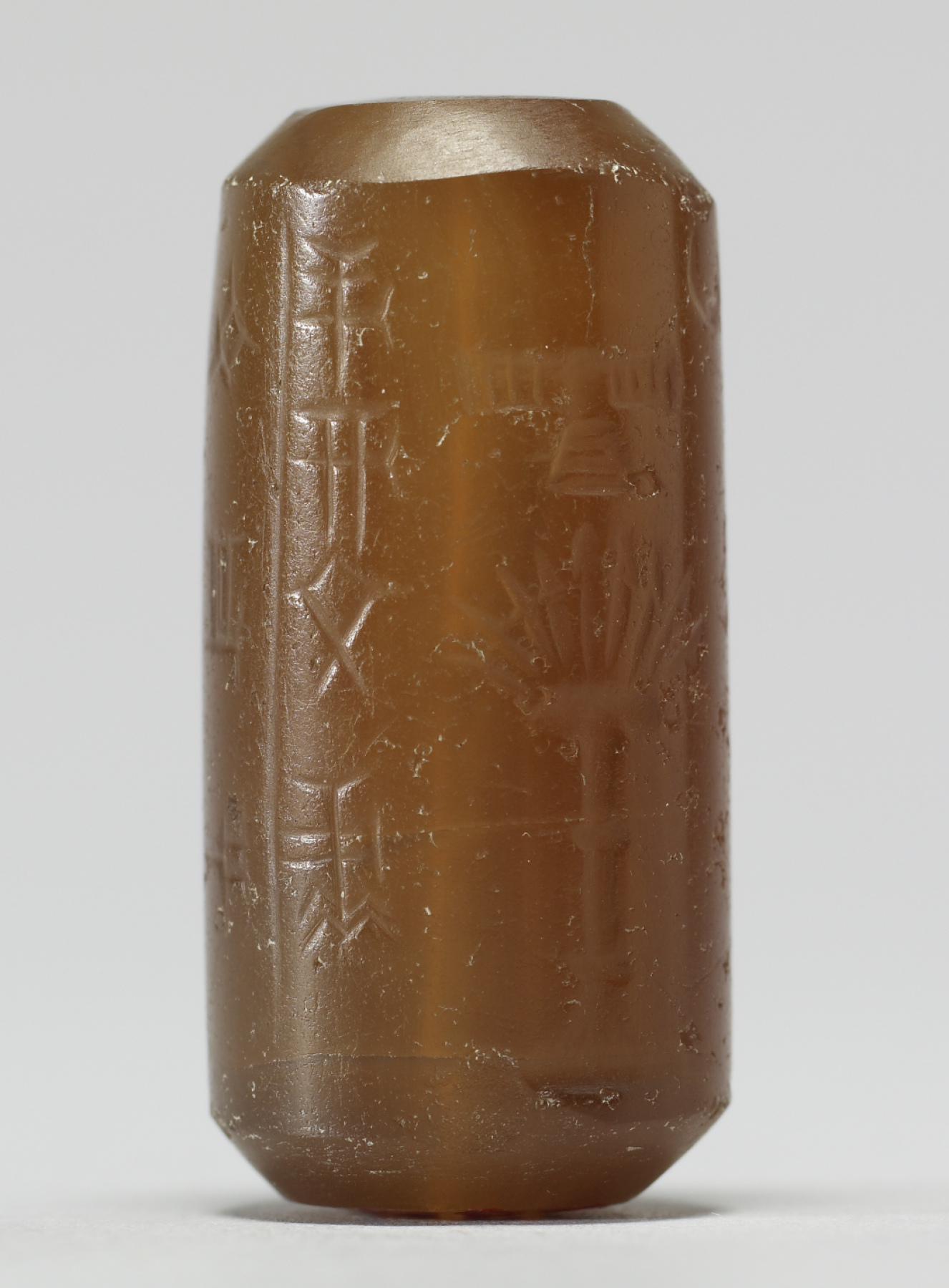
Photo, Side B of cylinder seal using KÚR. (high resolution, expandible photo)

The cuneiform KÚR sign is used extensively in the Amarna letters. It also has a minor usage in the Epic of Gilgamesh. Its usage in the Amarna letters is due to the letters' topics of "hostilities", "war", or "warfare" in the discord amongst the city-states and the regional discord in the Canaan region. A large subset of the Amarna letters are written by vassal kings in governorship of cities, towns or regions in Canaan.

The sign is a simple two-stroke sign, a horizontal (or slight upward-stroke) with a stroke slashing downwards across its center. The end result cuneiform sign is easily compared to a "squashed-X" alphabetic.

KÚR is used and is defined as a capital-letter Sumerogram (majuscule), and specifically in the Akkadian language has the meaning of "warfare", "hostility", Akkadian nukurtu. Any syllabic cuneiform sign with 'n' or 't' can supply the beginning or end of "nukurtu".

== Usage, and Amarna letters list ==
In the Epic of Gilgamesh, the KÚR sign is only used twice and only once for nukurtu, Tablet VI, line 40: "...a battering ram (Akkadian "iašubû") that attracts the enemy-('nukurtu', "hostility", nu-KÚR-ti) land,...."

=== List usage in Amarna letters ===
A partial of letters and the spelling of "nukurtu":

- nu-KÚR-te, Amarna letter EA 252, 252:9, (i-na nukurtu,, "in warfare"), photo here
- nu-KÚR-tu, EA 271, 271:11, obverse
- nu-KÚR-tu, EA 273, obverse
- nu-KÚR-ut, EA 286, 286:41, reverse
