= Ne (cuneiform) =

Cuneiform sign

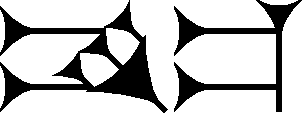
Cuneiform sign for bil-(=bí), kúm, ne, pil, ṭè, and as Sumerograms BIL, and NE, (sign uses from the Epic of Gilgamesh).

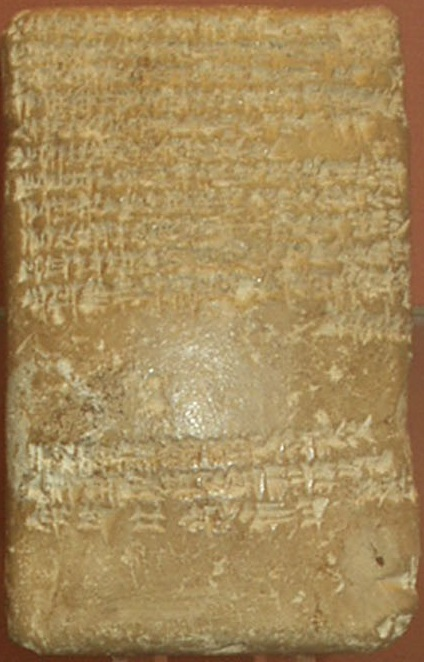
Amarna letter EA 9-(Reverse), Tushratta to Pharaoh, with usage of cuneiform bil in the spelling of qabû, "to say, tell", Paragraph 1 (tablet obverse). (high resolution, expandible photo, and last line, 3rd sign from left — bi), a common multi-use, multi-syllabic sign

The cuneiform Ne sign, is found in both the 14th century BC Amarna letters and the Epic of Gilgamesh. In the Amarna letters, it is especially used in the opening, and introductory paragraph of the clay tablet letter, when addressing the Pharaoh (King), or when sent to another individual who is part of the Pharaoh's correspondence, for the alternate syllabic usage of "bil", (used for the 'b'). In the Amarna letters, it is used as Bil (cuneiform), for the spelling of speaks, or "says", in the opening statement; the Akkadian language word is "qabû", for to say, tell. (There is a wide range of sign usage in the 300+ Amarna letters for spelling "qabû" in the introduction, or in the texts; some of the Amarna letters are texts other than actual 'letters'.)

The ne (cuneiform) sign has the following uses, besides "ne", in the Epic of Gilgamesh:

bil-(=bí (bi2))
kúm
ne
pil
ṭè
BIL (Sumerogram usage)
NE

The sign is a "two-part" compound sign. The center and left is the sign for am (cuneiform), and the right is the sign for is (cuneiform),, (and listed as Giš (cuneiform), cuneiform "GIŠ" (the "is" sign) being the use for GIŠ (wood Sumerogram)).

The specific usage numbers for the sign's meaning in the Epic of Gilgamesh is as follows: bil-(9), kúm-(5), ne-(1), pil-(2), ṭè-(13), BIL-(3), NE-(1).

In the Amarna letters, the sign is used for spelling qabû in the introduction for letters: EA 9, EA 19, EA 141, EA 144, EA 205, EA 254, EA 270, EA 271, and EA 367, as well as some others.

== Gallery ==
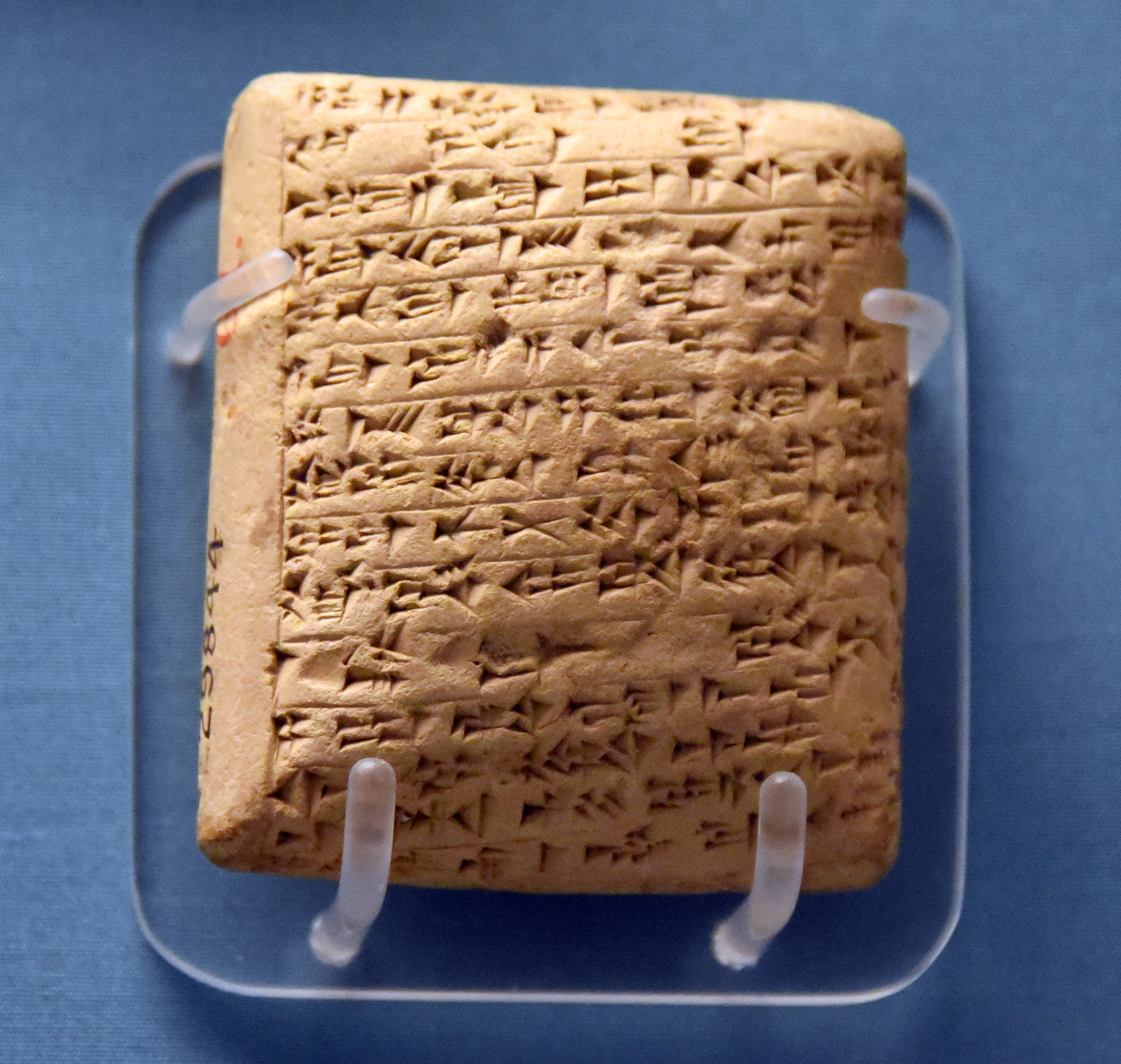
Amarna letter EA 252-(Obverse), line 2, qí-bil-ma, for "qabû", ("to speak", or "speaking")
