= Ṣur (cuneiform) =

Cuneiform sign

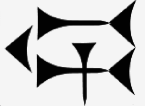
Cuneiform ṣur, and zur; also AMAR. (Note: the vertical does not exist on the ṣur hieroglyph.)

The cuneiform sign ṣur, is a common-use sign of the Amarna letters, the Epic of Gilgamesh, and other cuneiform texts (for example Hittite texts).

Linguistically, it has the alphabetical usage in texts for ṣ, or z; also r; for vowels, u, or as a replacement for the other three vowels, "a", "e", or "i".

== Epic of Gilgamesh usage ==
The ṣur sign usage in the Epic of Gilgamesh is as follows: (ṣur, 6 times, zur, 1 time, and AMAR, 1 time.

== Gallery ==
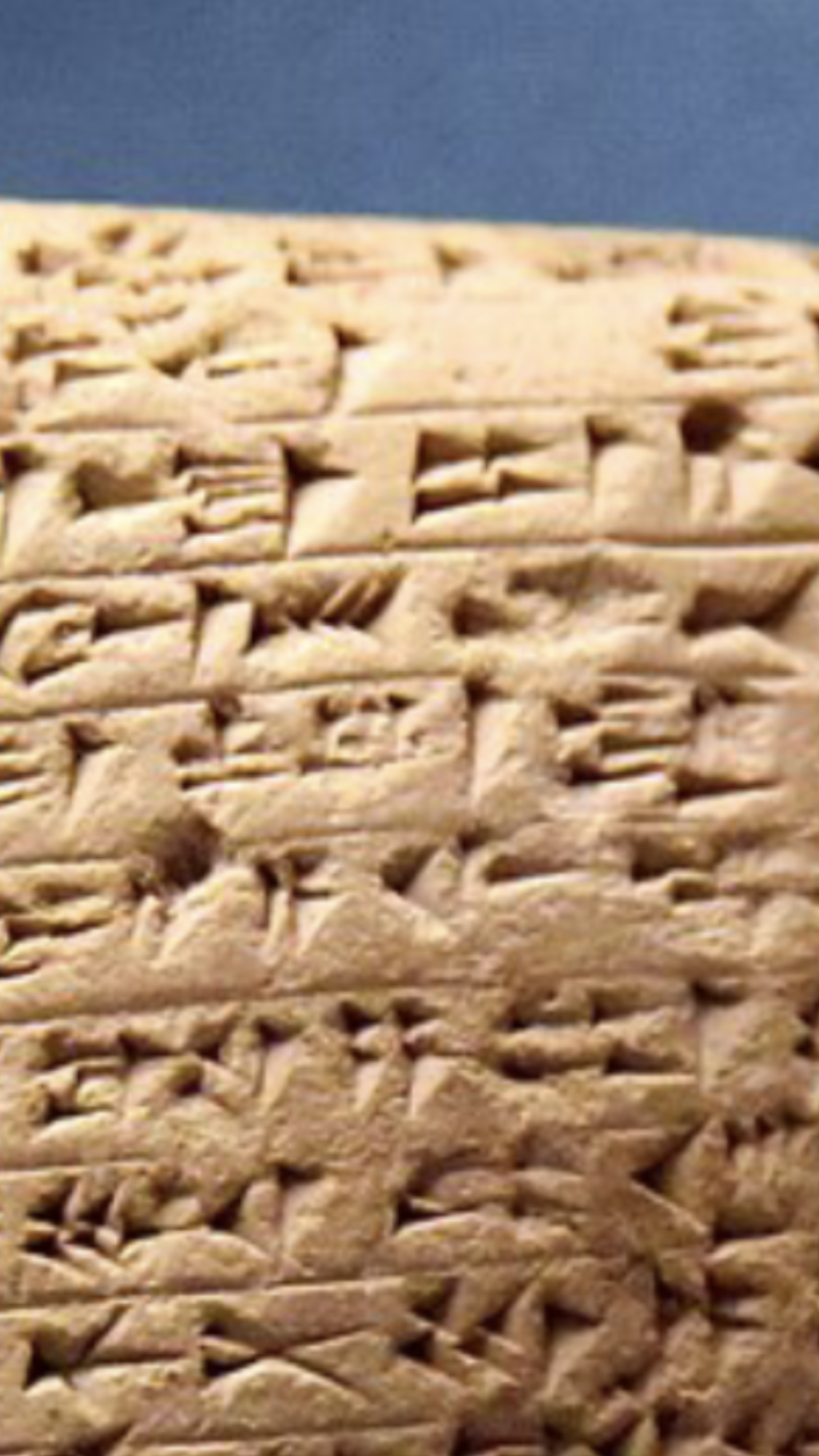
naṣāru, EA 252, line 8, (uṣ-ṣur-ru-na). (Cropped photo of EA 252, Obverse. The last pictured line (line 9), is line 9 (of 15 on obverse), (with the crossed, (swords) cuneiform (KÚR), for the Akkadian word for "warfare", Akkadian-"nukurtu".
