= Ha (cuneiform) =

Cuneiform sign

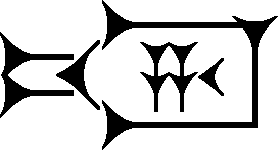
Digitized cuneiform sign for ha (Type I) (inside of outer cuneiform sign).

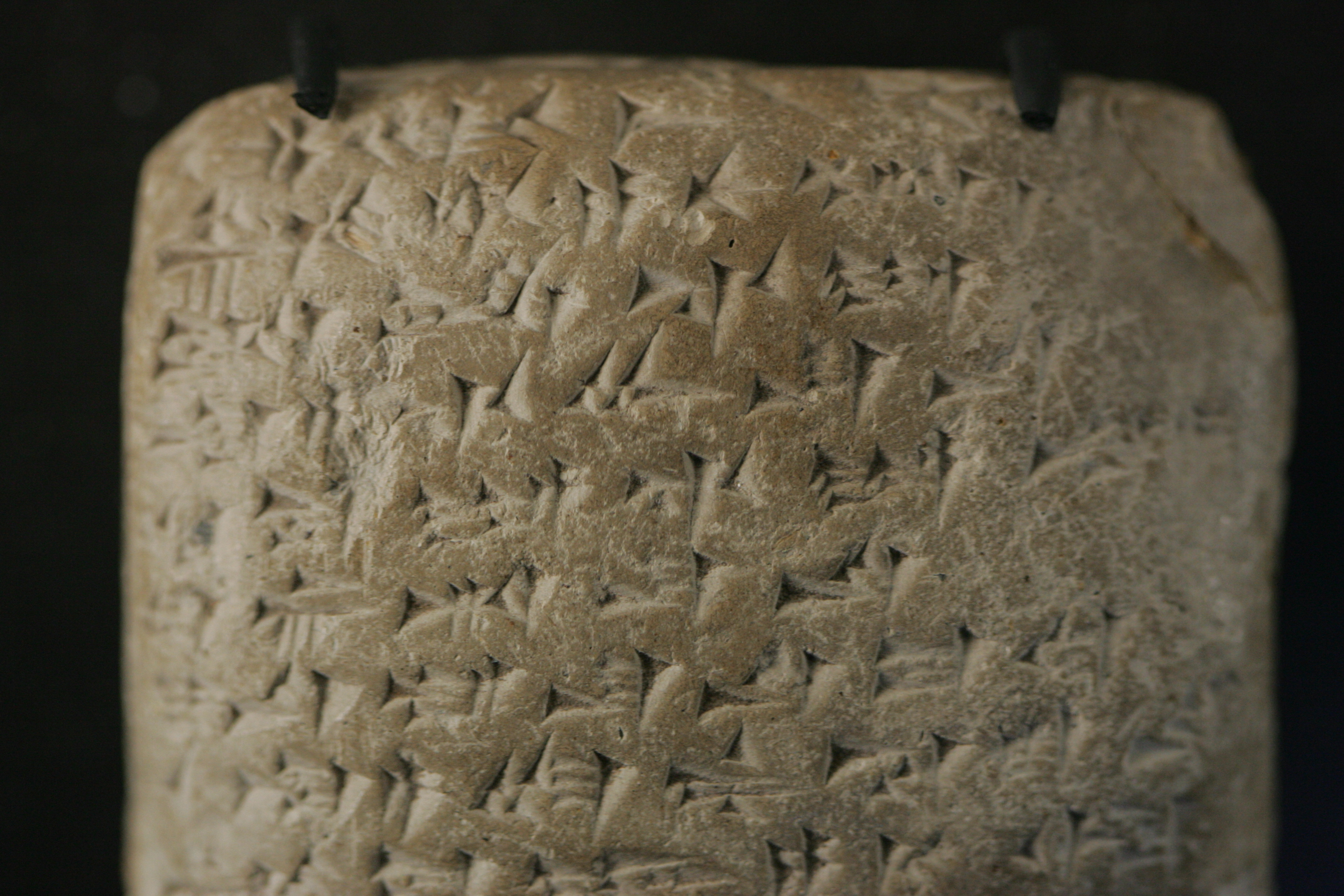
Amarna letter EA 365-(Reverse), Biridiya to Pharaoh, "Furnishing Corvée Workers"; line 2 (3rd sign, ha, (Type II)): Men-"City-Mayor"-(or Magistrate), "LÚ-MEŠ-ha-za-nu-ta-meš", Akkadian language for "hazannu" (ha defaced from surface scraping) (high resolution expandable photo)

The cuneiform ha sign comes in two common varieties in the 1350 BC Amarna letters. It is also found in the large 12-chapter (Tablets I-XII) work of the Epic of Gilgamesh. Cuneiform ha is used as a syllabic for ha, and an alphabetic for h, or a; from the Epic of Gilgamesh it also has two sumerogramic uses (capital letter (majuscule)), for HA (Akkadian language zittu, for "share"), and KU_{6}, for nūnu, "fish".

The digitized version of ha has 4, short vertical strokes, 2-pairs-of-2, in a square; it is ligatured at the right, typically with a large, or medium-large sized wedge-stroke. The 2nd type of cuneiform ha is consistent as: 2-verticals, with a wedge between, and a (typical) large wedge ligatured at right; (thus both types contain the wedge at the right).

Type I of the sign with four short vertical strokes, (1-pair, above another pair), is the za (cuneiform) sign, which is used for linguistic items like: ṣa, za, ZA, ZA being a sumerogram.

In the Epic of Gilgamesh the usage numbers for the ha sign is as follows: ha-(145 times), HA-(2), KU_{6}-(4).

== Selected list of Amarna letter usage by type ==
Selected Amarna letter usage by type, with some explanation of the letter texts:

Type I

- EA 153, 153:6
- EA 256, 256:28, city: URU-Ha-Ya-uN, Hayyunu, city: Ayyun (a letter listing cities in the Golan, Canaan)
- EA 367, 367:7, Envoy Hani, ^{I}HA-A-NI (see here: lines 3–5, scribe-line, lines 6–8)

Type II (2nd vertical and wedge often larger)

- EA 245, 245:6(6B(on reverse)), 18
- EA 270, 270:11 (line 11), ^{I}iYa-aN-Ha-Mu, for official: Yanhamu (ha partially damaged)
- EA 365, 365:16
