= Te (cuneiform) =

Cuneiform sign

Cuneiform te, and Sumerogram for TE, ṬE:

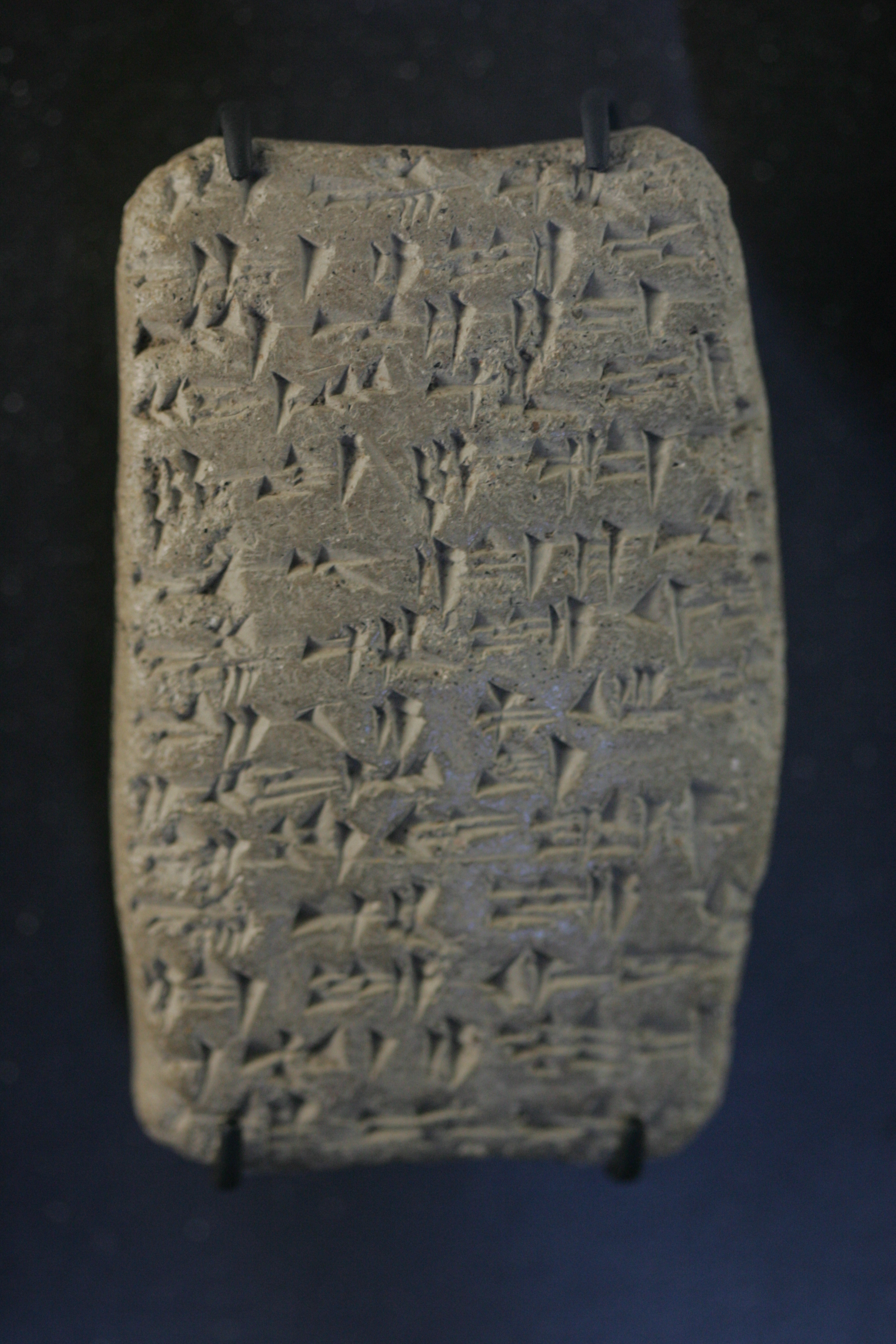
Amarna letter EA 364-(obverse), Ayyab to Pharaoh. In Line 10, 2nd character from left-(5th line from bottom); text reads left-to-right. (extreme high resolution, expandible photo)

The cuneiform te sign is found in both the 14th century BC Amarna letters and the Epic of Gilgamesh; it is also notable in the Hittite language, and for that language, besides its usage as te, it is a Sumerogram (logogram or ideogram), and is used as a component in the word for "envoy", (LÚ-ȚE-mu), or LÚ-ṬE-mi,. 'Envoy' is used in the famous Hittite annals, narrating the story of Prince Zannanza who after going to Egypt to become husband (and Pharaoh) to Queen Nefertiti, was intercepted and killed.

The usage of te in the Epic of Gilgamesh, is only for syllabic or alphabetic te, 124 times.

The sign also comes in two forms, with two pairs of the left 4-signs, or one above a row of 3-signs, either group tilted, down to the right.
