= Ab (cuneiform) =

Cuneiform sign

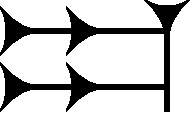
Cuneiform sign (𒀊) for ab, ap; in the Epic of Gilgamesh, a sumerogram usage for AB, Akkadian "elder", šību

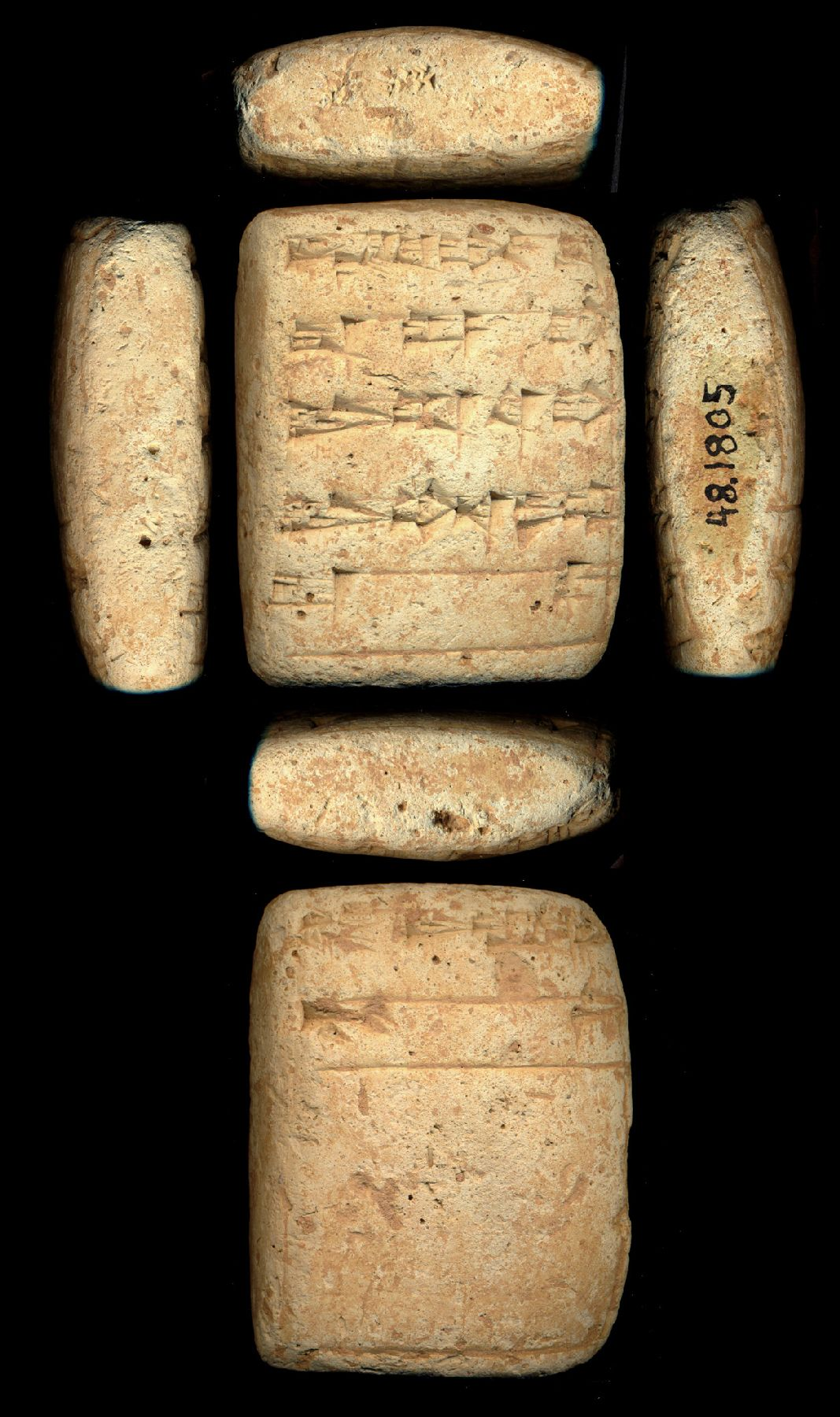
Mesopotamian tablet for Sin-Kashid. Line 3, second character, ab. (Note that the second pair of horizontals angle up, and down, to the large vertical stroke anchoring the right of the "ab" sign.)

The cuneiform sign (𒀊) for the syllable ab also represents that for ap, or the vowel and consonant usages of a, b, or p: in the Akkadian language "b" is unaspirated, formed with the lips, and "p" is aspirated, with the breath). In the Akkadian language "b" and "p" are interchangeable; also, in cuneiform texts, any vowel (a, e, i or u: there is no "o" in Akkadian) can be interchanged with any other. The ab/ap sign also has a corresponding capital letter (majuscule) usage as a sumerogram, as found in the Epic of Gilgamesh for AB, the Akkadian language for šību, meaning "elder".

In the corpus of the Amarna letters, where ab/ap is also commonly found, the names occur of the authors of letters to the Pharaoh, for example Labaya and Ayyab, in both of which the syllabic use of "ab is found.

The usage numbers for the "ab" cuneiform sign in Tablets I-XII of the Epic of Gilgamesh are as follows: ab - 11, ap - 28 and sumerogram AB - 12. For šību, Akkadian language for elder, only two spellings use "AB"; six other spellings of šību" are syllabic/alphabetic.
