= Za (cuneiform) =

Cuneiform sign

Cuneiform za, ṣa, and ZA sign. (Assyrian)

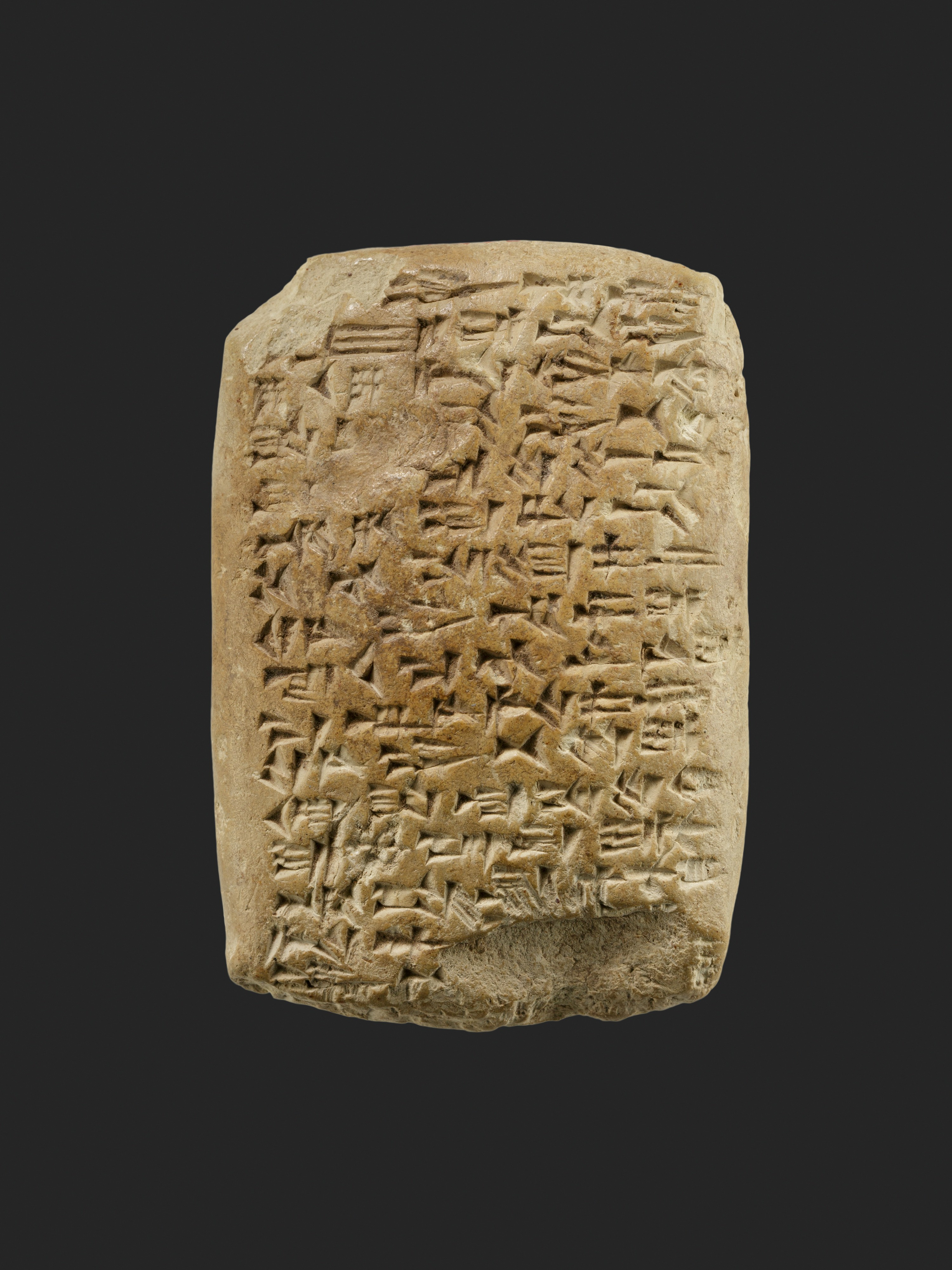
Cuneiform sign ZA, 13 line, 3rd character from line end, EA 15, Obverse. (See line drawing below)

The cuneiform sign za is a common use sign in the Amarna letters and the Epic of Gilgamesh. It is used syllabically for ṣa, za, and ZA (ZA as parts of personal names, places, or common words, etc.), and alphabetically for "ṣ" (s), "z", or "a". (All the 4 vowels, a, e, i, o are interchangeable.)

In the 14th century BC Amarna letters, "za" is used in the spelling of the word for "mayor" (city, city-state administrator), Akkadian hazannu. For example, in EA 144 (from Zimreddi of Sidon), obverse, line 5: "man-hazzanu", ^{Lú}-Ha-za-nu. Za has a fairly high usage in the vassal states sub-corpus of the Amarna letters.

== Epic of Gilgamesh use ==
For the Epic of Gilgamesh, the following usage is found in Tablets I-XII: ṣa-(79 times); za-(32); ZA-(15 times).

== Symbol ==
—Cuneiform sign ZA

- Borger (2003): 851
- Borger (1981):
- HZL: 366

phonetic values

- Sumerian: ZA
- Akkadian: za, sà, ṣa
- Hittite:
