= Id (cuneiform) =

Cuneiform sign

Cuneiform id/it, and the other sub-uses plus sumerogram.

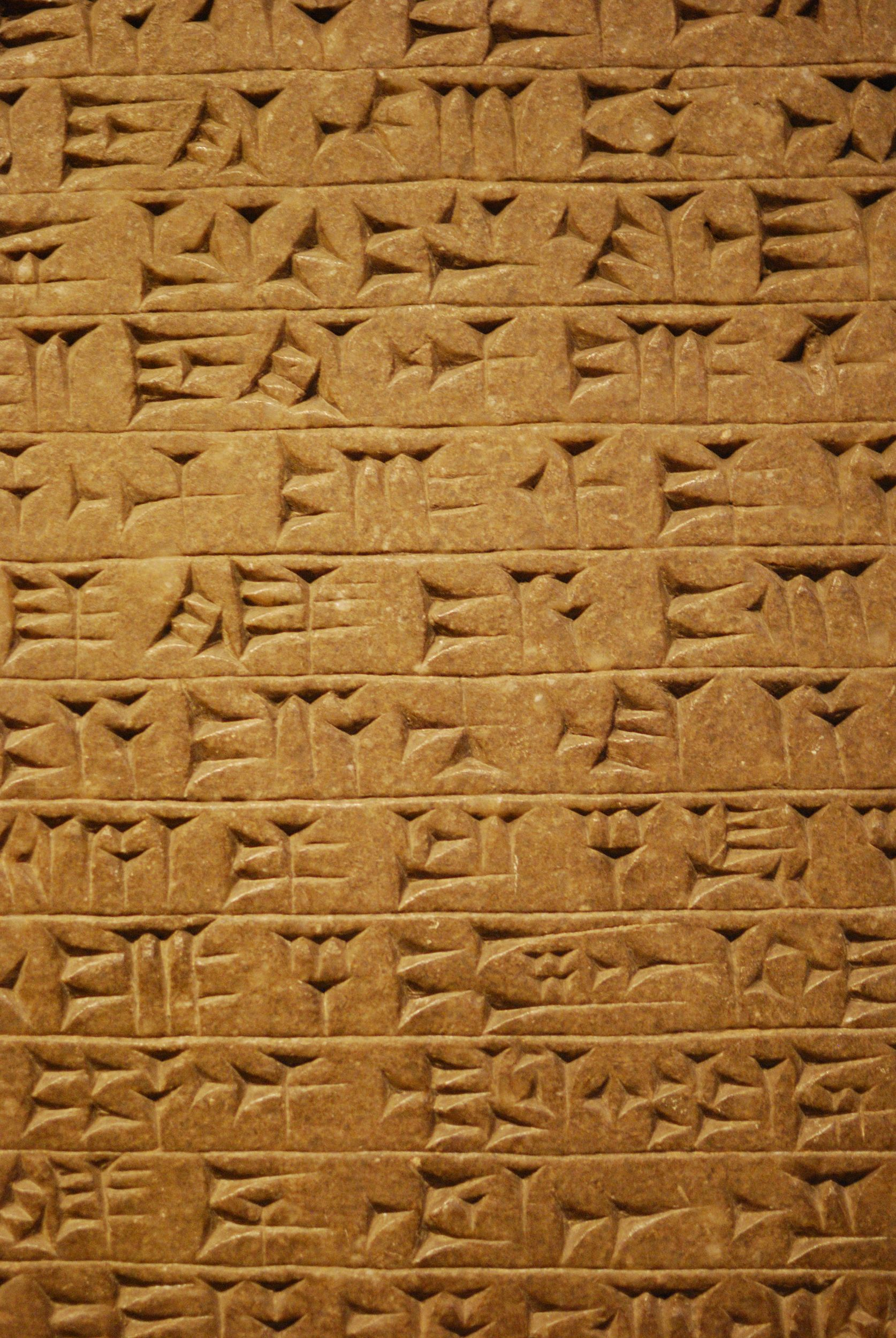
Cuneiform sign id/it, lines 1 & 3.

The cuneiform sign id, also it, and with other sub-uses, including a sumerogram, Á, for Akkadian language idû, (English: to know, to make known, recognize, to inform, proclaim), is a common-use sign in the Epic of Gilgamesh, the Amarna letters, and other cuneiform texts. Letters ("d/t") are paired consonants in the Akkadian language ('voiced'/'unvoiced'), thus the other sub-uses of the sign are for ed, et, eṭ, and iṭ. Cuneiform id/it can be a syllabic for ed, et, eṭ, id, it, and iṭ, or an alphabetic for any of the constructs thereof. It is also has a sub-use for á, as well as the sumerogram for Á.

== Epic of Gilgamesh usage ==
Cuneiform id/it has other sub-uses in the Epic of Gilgamesh. The following can be found: á--(5) times, ed--(4), et--(11), eṭ--(13), id--(27), it--(121), iṭ--(21), and Á--(3) times.
