= Me (cuneiform) =

Cuneiform sign

Cuneiform for me, and ME, digitized form.

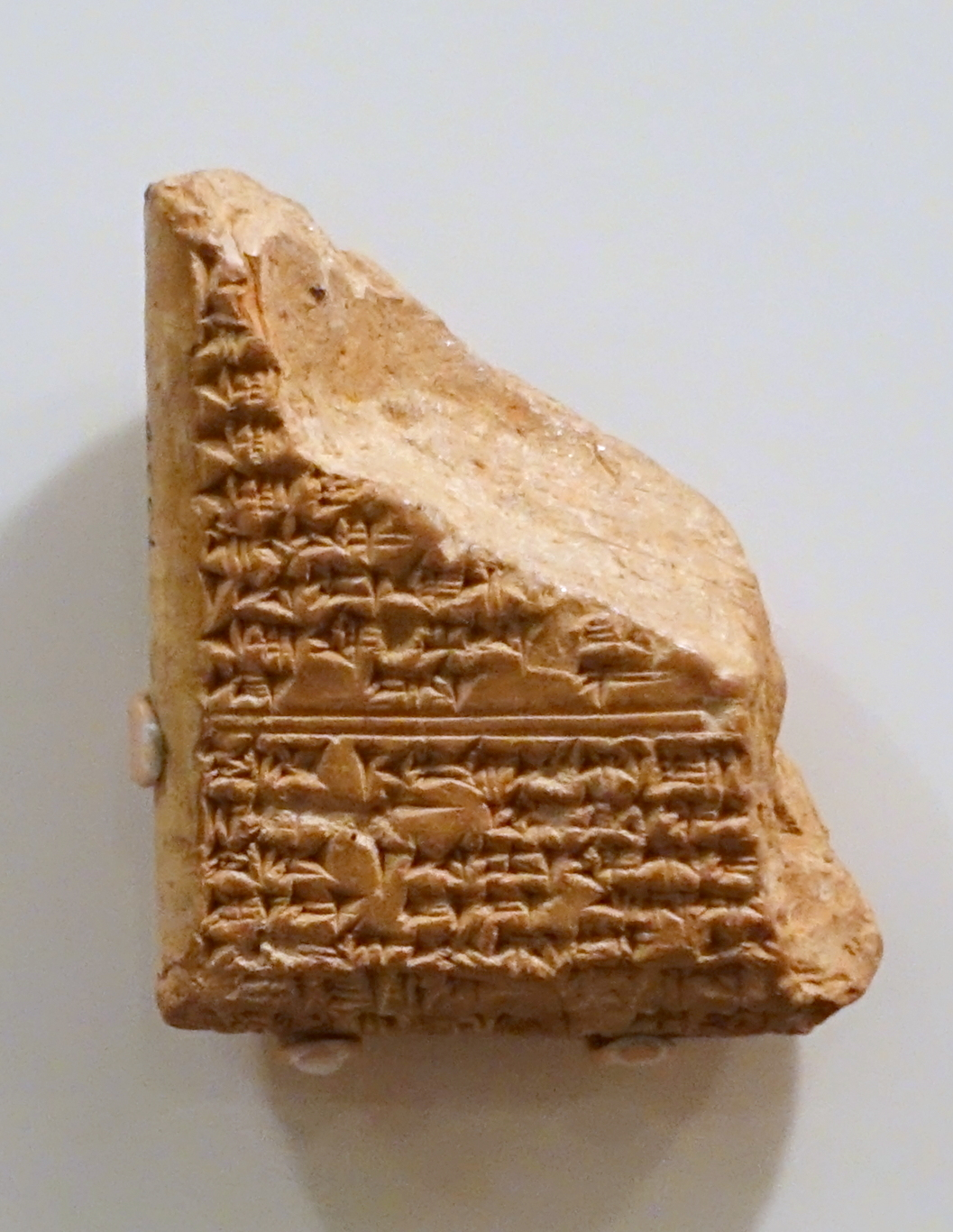
EA 26, fragment (Obverse). (high-resolution expandable photo) (Last flat-surface 5-lines on fragment (Para IV), lines 30–34.

The cuneiform me sign (𒈨) is a common multi-use sign of the Epic of Gilgamesh, the 1350 BC Amarna letters, and other cuneiform texts. It also has a sumerogrammic usage for ME in the Epic of Gilgamesh.

Because of its extensive syllabic multi-use (in the Epic of Gilgamesh), its grammatical usage would be as follows: all the syllabic usages possible, but for alphabetic usage, as follows; for consonants, it could be used for "m", "s", "š", "b", and "p". (b and p are interchangeable, and s can also be substituted for š, and vice versa for all four). For the vowel e ( or ì, i ), all the four vowels, a, e, i, and u, can also be interchanged in the formation of words.

== Epic of Gilgamesh usage ==
In the Epic of Gilgamesh, Tablets I-XII, "me" is used for the following meanings by the following numbers: me-(98) times, mì-(9), sip-(1), šeb-(3), šep-(1), šib-(12), šip-(2), and ME-(5) times.

== See also ==
- Me (mythology)
