= Ud (cuneiform) =

Cuneiform sign

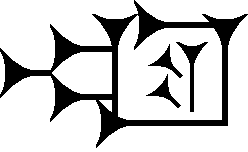
A style of ud/ut (inside ka (cuneiform), KA x UD).

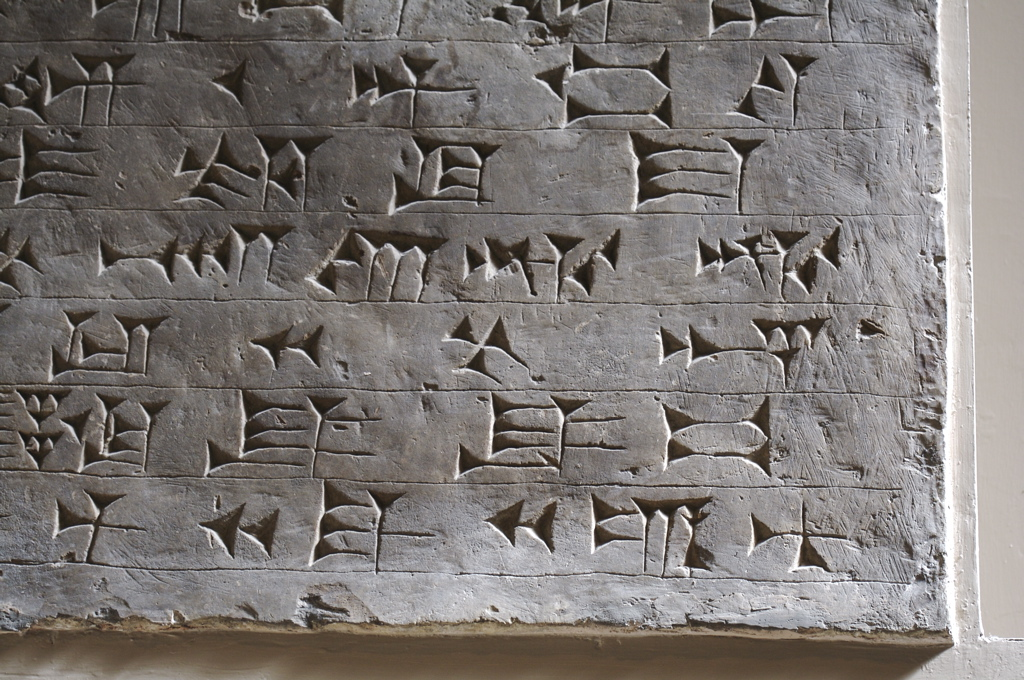
Inscription at the British Museum Sign ut/ud, last sign in line 1. Line 1: im, u, an, ṣur-(or =AMAR), and ud. (high resolution expandible photo)

The cuneiform ud sign, also ut, and with numerous other syllabic and Sumerogram uses, is a common sign for the mid 14th-century BC Amarna letters and the Epic of Gilgamesh. The sign is constructed upon the single vertical stroke, with various positionings of two wedge-strokes at the left, sometimes approximately centered, or often inscribed upwards to the left, the second wedge-stroke (or 'angled line-stroke'), occasionally inscribed/ligatured upon the first. The wedge-strokes can have any size, are often smaller than the vertical, but as an example, Amarna letter EA 256, can be almost as large as the vertical.

In the Epic of Gilgamesh, sign ud is listed as used for the following linguistic elements:

- lah
- par
- pir
- tam
- tú
- ud
- ut
- uṭ

Sumerograms

- BABBAR--"silver"
- UD--"daily", "day", (2nd "daily"-(no. 2))
- UTU--"sun"

The usage numbers for each linguistic element in the Epic of Gilgamesh are as follows: lah--(2), par--(5), pir--(4), tam--(32), tú--(46), ud--(30), ut--(95), uṭ-(7), BABBAR-(1), UD-(75), UTU-(58).

== Amarna letters usage ==
In the Amarna letters, mid 1300s BC, letters written to the King (Pharaoh) of Egypt (or an official at the Egyptian court), many letters (numbered up to EA 382, about 300+ actual letters, or partials) are written by 'governors' of city-states in Canaan.

The Canaanite letters are famous for various forms of a prostration formula, following a 'letter Introduction'. The introduction often states accolades such as: "...(of) My-God(s), My Sun-God,....", or continuing, "My Sun, from, Heaven"-(heaven), sa-me. (Akkadian language: ^{an}UTU-ia ^{AN}UTU-Sa-Me, English: God-Sun-mine, Heaven-Sun-"Sa-Me", for Akkadian heaven, "šamû".) "Sun" is here used as UTU. Numerous Canaanite letters use this; other letters, for example Amarna letter EA 34 titled: The Pharaoh's Reproach Answered, addresses the Pharaoh as being honored "daily", referring to Sun God Ra's daily appearance–as "the sun" itself; Akkadian language 'daily', is "ūmussu", and EA 34 uses UD (day, daily), ud-mi.
