= La (cuneiform) =

Cuneiform sign

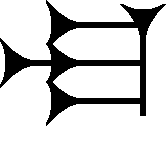
Cuneiform La sign.

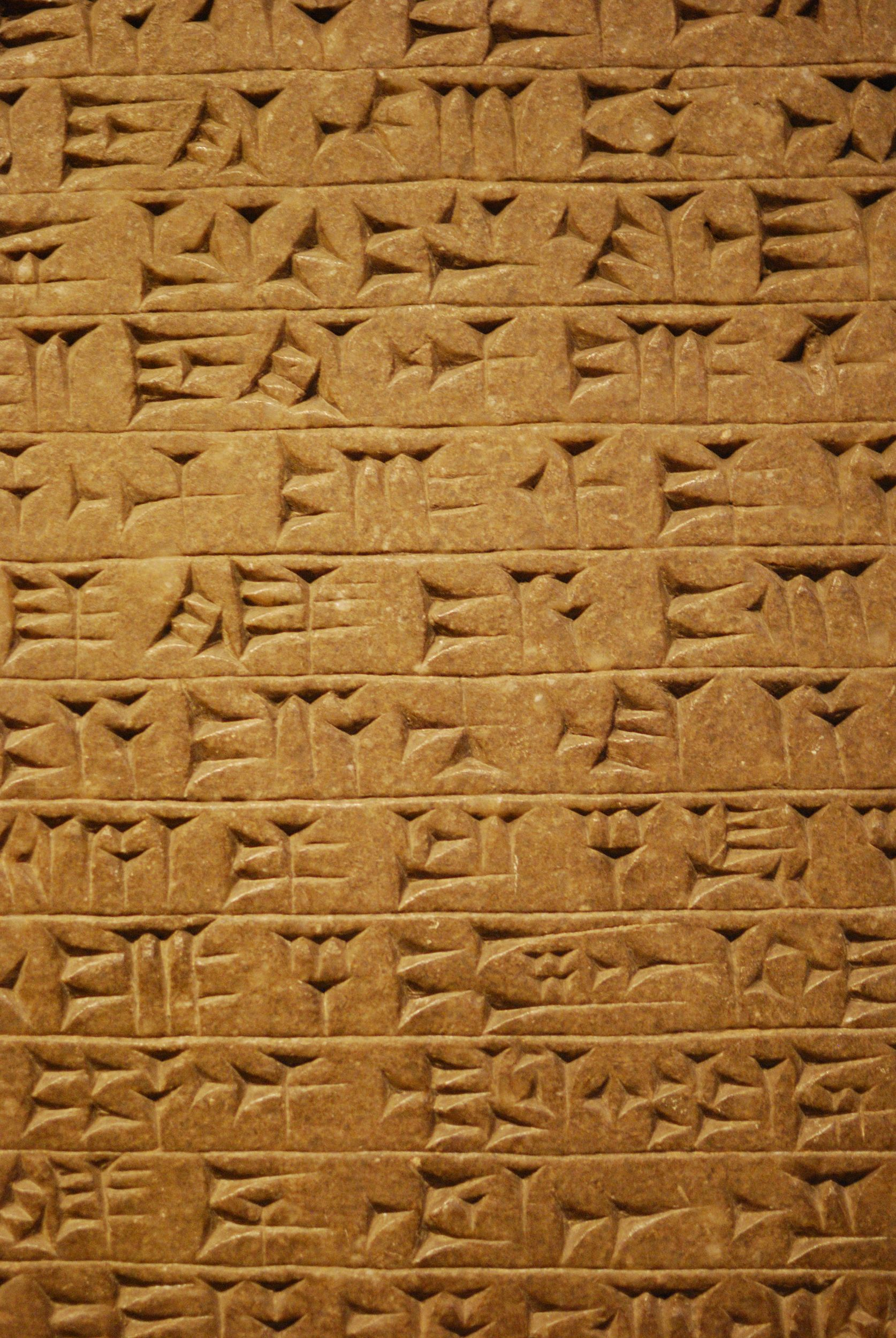
Cuneiform sign La, line 2: last cuneiform sign.

The cuneiform sign for la (𒆷), and also in the Epic of Gilgamesh the sumerogram LA-(capital letter (majuscule), is a common-use sign for the Epic and for the 1350 BC Amarna letters. It is used for syllabic la, and also for alphabetic l, or a.

== Epic of Gilgamesh use ==
In the Epic of Gilgamesh it used in the following numbers: la-(348), LA-(5) times.

== Amarna letter usage ==
The Amarna letter usage of cuneiform la is common for the spelling of Akkadian language "lā", English language, "not", as it is composed of 'la-a'-. It is also used infrequently for just 'la', for "not", (lā).
