= Nu (cuneiform) =

Cuneiform sign

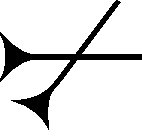
Cuneiform sign nu.

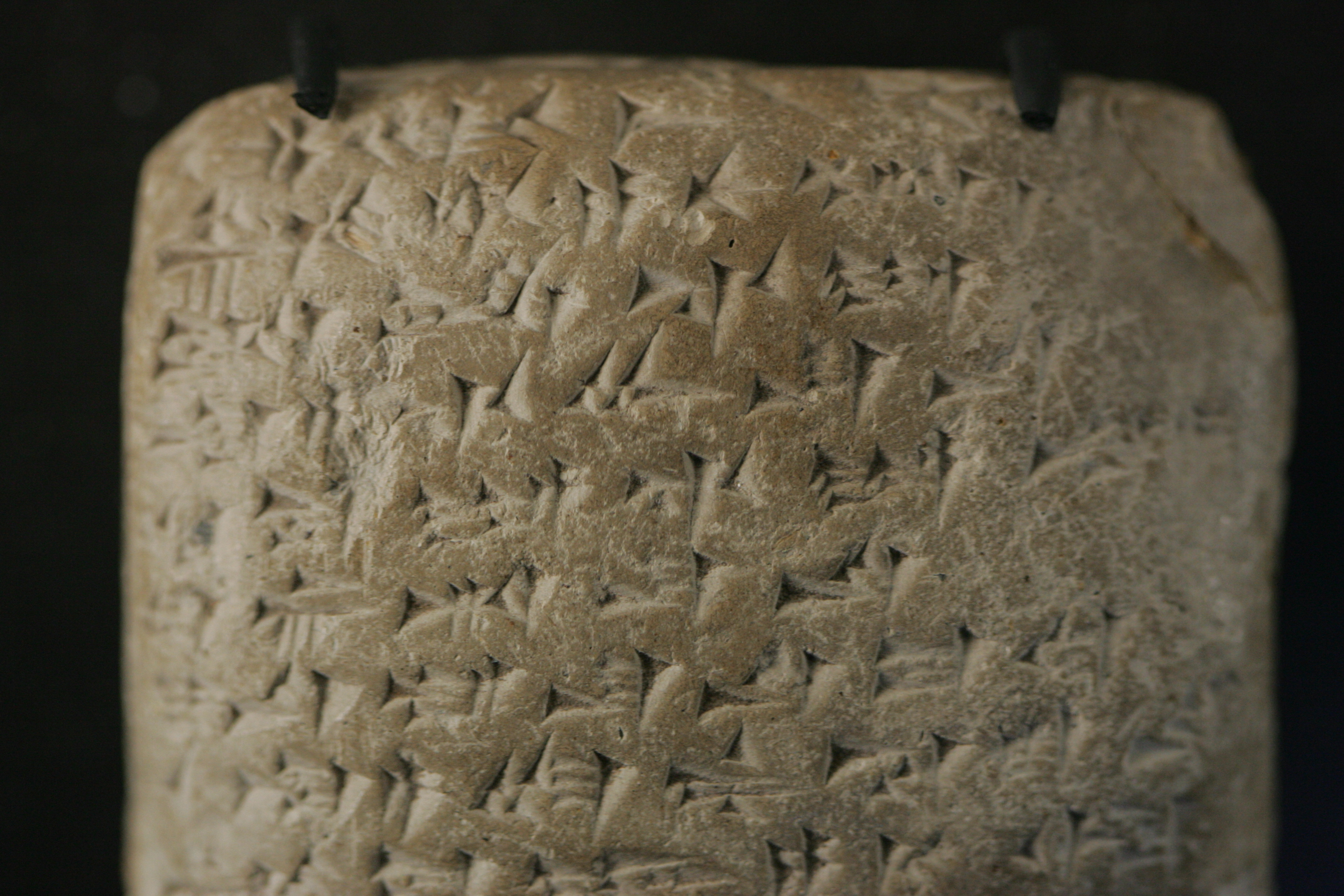
Amarna letter EA 365-(Reverse), Biridiya to Pharaoh, "Furnishing Corvée Workers"; 2nd line: LÚ.MEŠ-ha-za-nu-ta-meš. "Men.(plural)-hazzanu-(pl.)"-('mayor(s)'/'chief magistrate(s)' of a city) (High Resolution expandable photo)

Cuneiform sign nu is a common use syllabic, or alphabetic (for n or u). It is restricted to "nu", but in the Epic of Gilgamesh, or elsewhere has a Sumerogram (capital letter, majuscule) use NU, and probably mostly for a component in personal names (PN), god's names, or specialized names for specific items that use Sumerograms.

It is also a common use syllabic/alphabetic sign in the mid 14th-century BC Amarna letters. Since the letters often discuss 'present conditions' in regions, or in cities of the vassal Canaanite region, a segue adverb meaning "now", or now, at this time..., Akkadian language "enūma" is often used, and almost exclusively using nu.

The usage numbers for nu in the Epic of Gilgamesh are as follows: nu-(317), NU-(2).

== Two styles of "nu" sign ==
Since the nu cuneiform sign is in a small category of "2-stroke" signs, it is interesting that there exist two simple varieties of the sign. After the first horizontal stroke is made, it is seen that in many uses an upward stroke is laid upon it (as in the digitized version shown). The second variety is a complete wedge-style stroke placed upon the horizontal. The premier example shown is on the photo of the reverse of Amarna letter EA 365 (top photo), in the 2nd line, (line 365:16, reverse).

Also, line art drawings of cuneiform signs, from a document, or article have the possibility of showing the nu sign with either of the two types of the sign, showing either, (arrow) wedge strokes, or a wedge stroke (full triangle-type) stroke. The alternate wedge-triangle type would look similar to this:, but the wedge moved to the center, or beginning of the horizontal (adjacent the head of the horizontal stroke).

=== Akkadian language "nukurtu" ===
In the Amarna letters, the spelling of Akkadian language (nuKÚRtu), "nukurtu", for war, or hostilities, is almost exclusively spelled starting with nu, but ending with various syllabics to supply the "t" ending.

== See also ==
- KÚR (cuneiform)#List usage in Amarna letters, for nu of Akkadian "nukurtu"
