= URU (Sumerogram) =

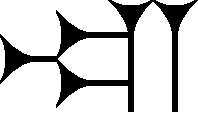
Cuneiform sign URU.

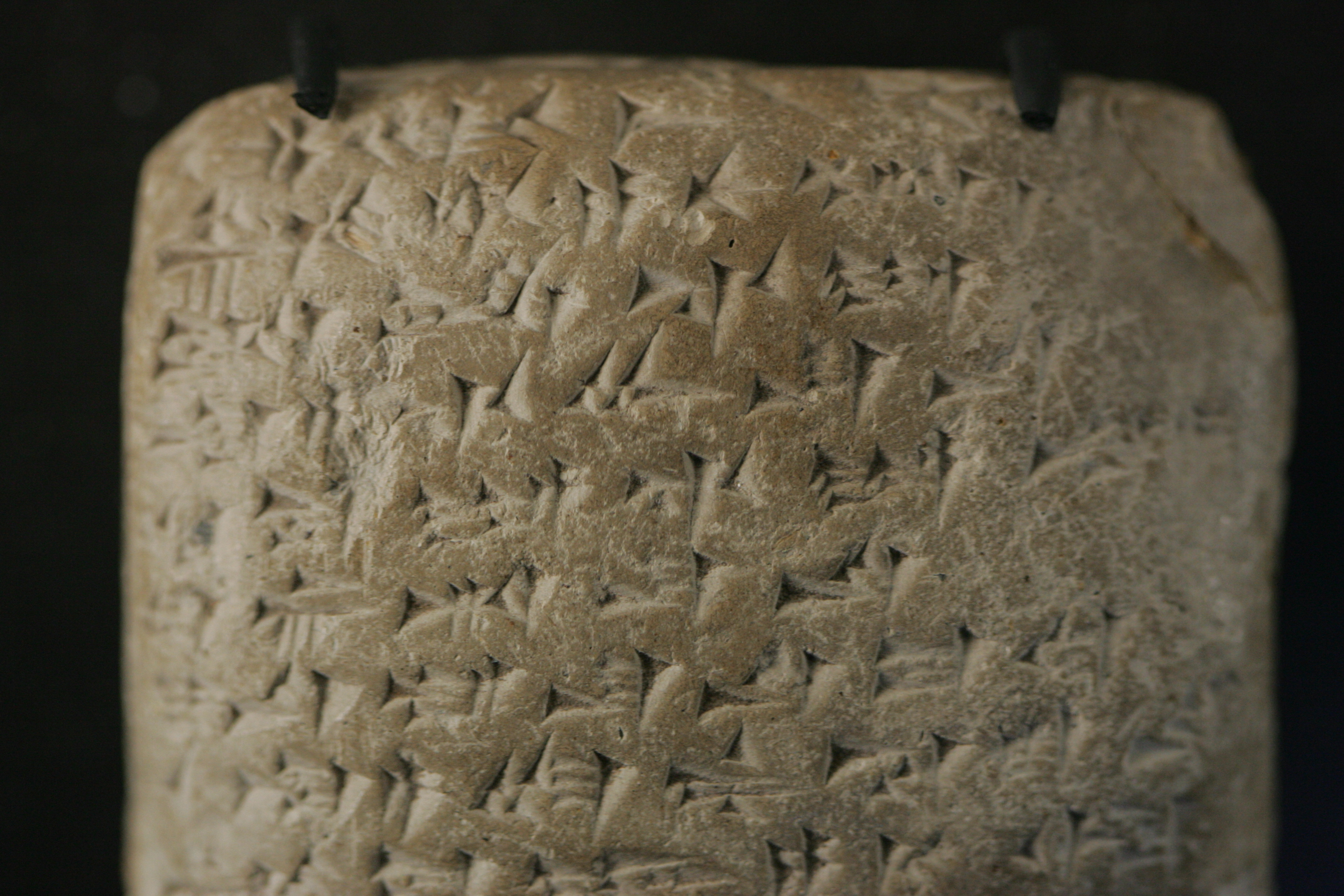
Amarna letter EA 365-(Reverse), Biridiya to Pharaoh, titled: "Furnishing Corvée Workers"; 7th line: "i-na ^{URU}-Šu-na-ma-(^{ki})", "in ^{City}-ŠuNaMa-(^{yours})". (high resolution expandable photo)

The cuneiform sign URU is a relatively distinctive sign in the cuneiform sign lists; with its two verticals at the sign's right, and the central long horizontal stroke, it is not easily confused with other signs. It is commonly found in the intrigues of the 14th century BC Amarna letters since the letters often concern city-state locations, or surrounding regions or cities/towns. URU is also used in the Epic of Gilgamesh. The cuneiform sign is almost exclusively used as a Sumerogram (capital letter (majuscule)), and in the Akkadian language, it is the Akkadian for "ālu", city, or town. The usage of URU in the Epic of Gilgamesh is only for Sumerogram "URU", (11 times). All uses in the Epic for URU are for various spellings of ālu, and usually an added sign complement; there is one usage in the Epic of URU for the city Shuruppak: URU.Šu-ri-ip-pak, (Tablet XI 11).
