= LÚ =

Cuneiform sign

Late form of cuneiform LÚ sign

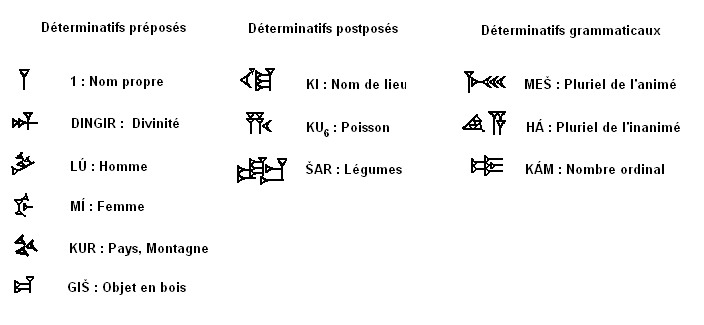
Simplified version of LÚ Sumerogram (also lú in texts).

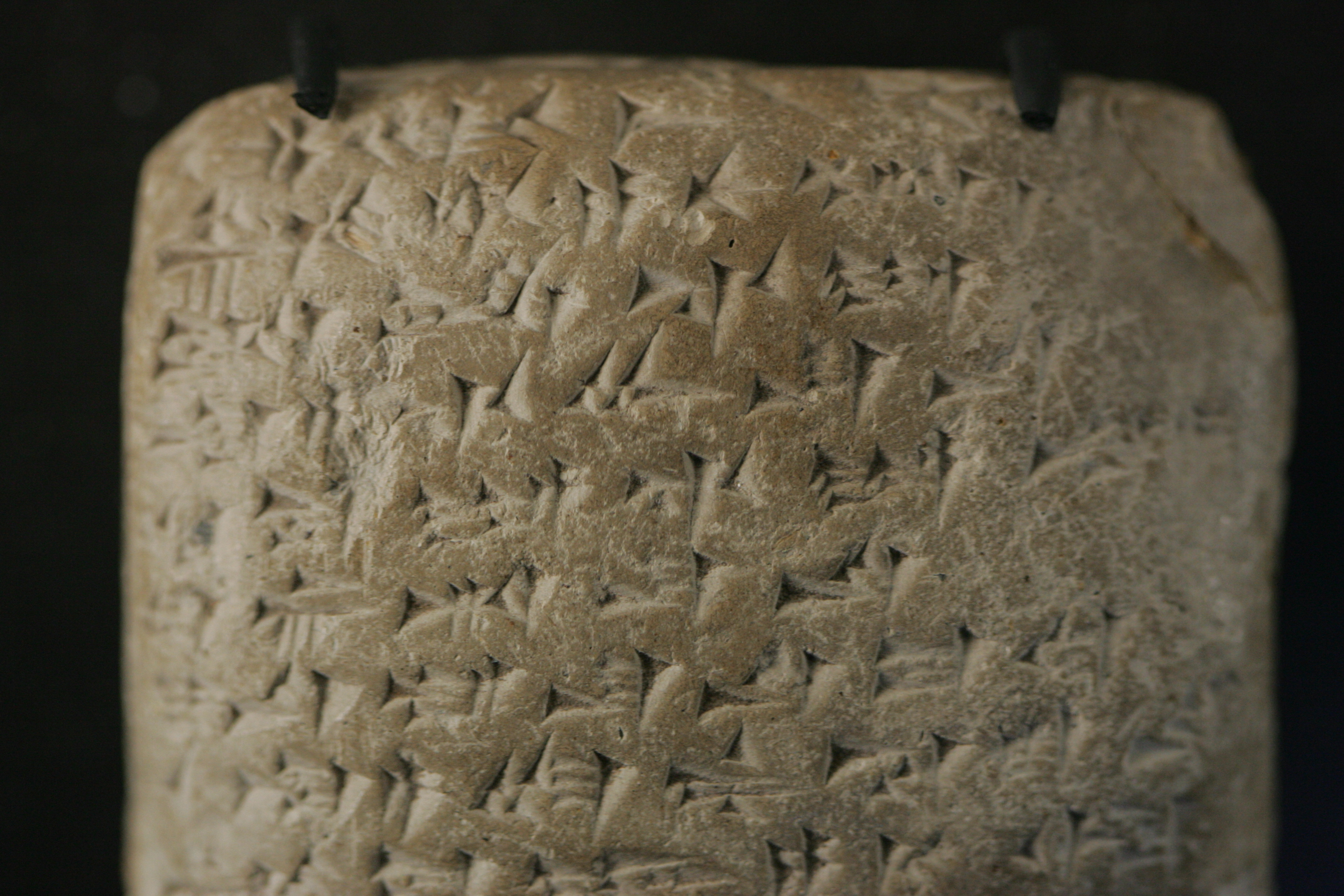
Amarna letter EA 365-(Reverse), Biridiya to Pharaoh, "Furnishing Corvée Workers"; 2nd line: LÚ.MEŠ-ha-za-nu-ta-meš. (best example on EA 365, reverse) "Men.(plural)-hazzanu-(pl.)"-('mayor(s)'/'chief magistrate(s)' of a city) (high resolution expandable photo)

The cuneiform sign LÚ (𒇽) is the sign used for "man"; its complement is the symbol for woman: šal (𒊩). Cuneiform LÚ, (or lú as rendered in some texts) is found as a Sumerogram in the Epic of Gilgamesh. It also has a common usage in the 1350 BC Amarna letters as the Sumerogram for "man".

In the Epic of Gilgamesh, LÚ is only used as the Sumerogram, LÚ-(58 times).

Both lú, for "man", and šal for "woman" are also considered as determinatives. In the Amarna letters' Rainey's glossary (Rainey 1970) which is the glossary for Akkadian language words, Sumerograms, etc., for Amarna letters EA 359–379, uses for both LÚ and lú are recorded. For the Amarna letters in Rainey's glossary, "LÚ" as the Sumerogram becomes Akkadian amēlu, for "man".

== Two styles of "LÚ" sign ==
The digitized version of the LÚ sign (Parpola 1971) is a member of the "3-horizontals" section (listed sign nos. 326-349 in the Epic of Gilgamesh, Parpola 1971). Notably the digitized version contains the 3-verticals along the horizontal base; the 3-upper-large-wedges (actually strokes) are digitized with a 4th, at the top of the digital cuneiform representation.

The alternate, abbreviated version of LÚ (as seen in the chart above), shows an upward angled base horizontal; the 3-wedges (strokes) are attached to it at approximately a right angle (approximating 90 degrees). Some of the Amarna letters (for example EA 34), show LÚ in compacted use, and with a high angle for the horizontal-base stroke. The result is that the entire sign appears triangular, much like the triangular 1+3 stroke sign, triangular, the hi (cuneiform). (Cuneiform hi is also used for he, and three Sumerograms, in Tablets I-XII of the Epic of Giglamesh).
