= I (cuneiform) =

Cuneiform sign

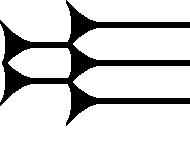
Cuneiform sign i (used in many languages).

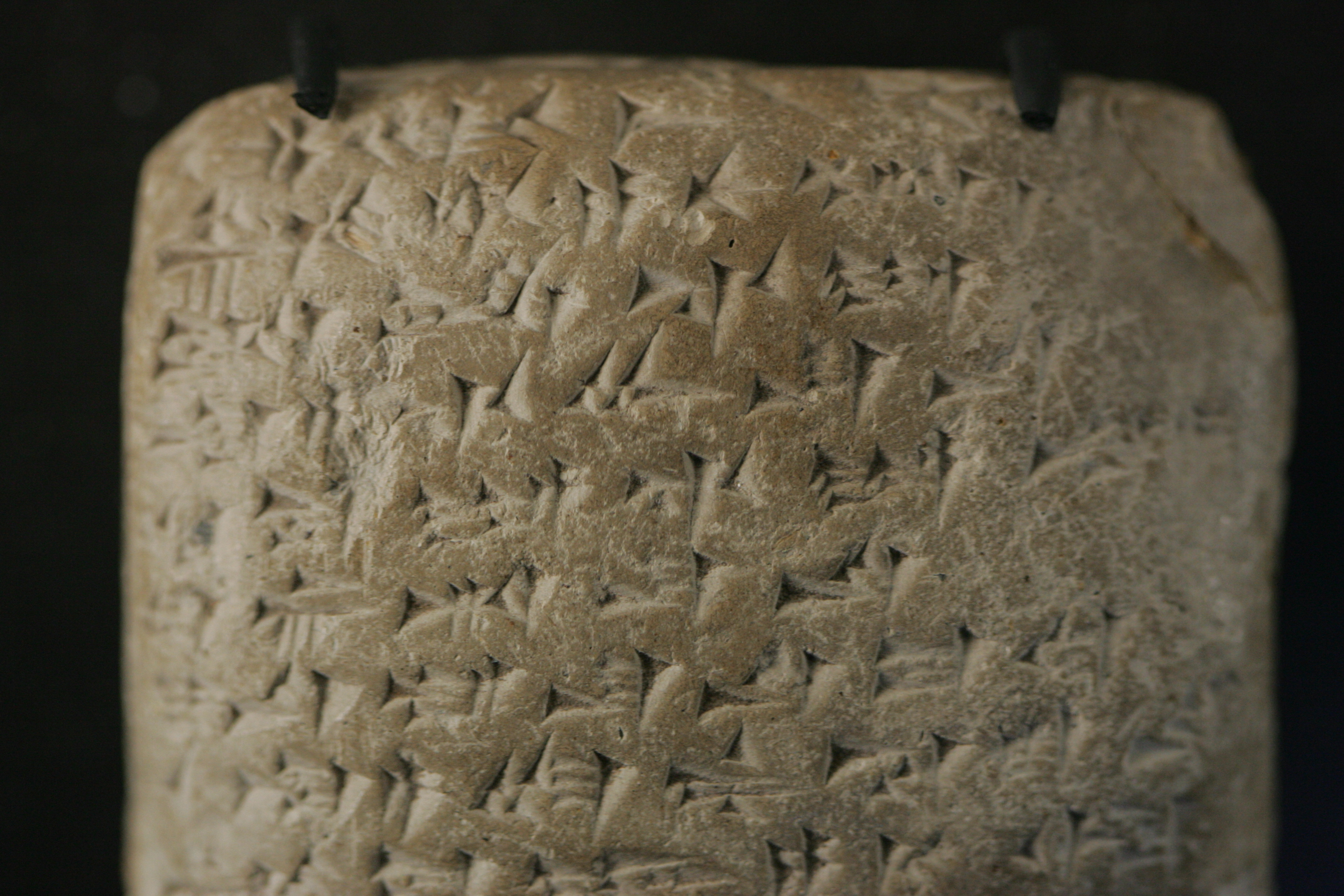
Amarna letter EA 365-(Reverse), Biridiya to Pharaoh, "Furnishing Corvée Workers"; 7th line: i-na URU-Šunama-ki, "...in (city)-Šunama-(his)". Note: i as part of ia (cuneiform) in 3rd line. ("ia" is best visual; i-na of 7th line has i-(visually deformed/at angle) on the left side (margin) of the clay tablet) (High Resolution expandable photo)

The cuneiform i sign is a common use vowel sign. It can be found in many languages, examples being the Akkadian language of the Epic of Gilgamesh (hundreds of years, parts of millenniums) and the mid 14th-century BC Amarna letters; also the Hittite language-(see table of Hittite cuneiform signs below).

In the Epic of Gilgamesh it also has a minor usage as a sumerogram, I. The usage numbers from the Epic are as follows: i-(698), I-(1).

As i and one of the four vowels in Akkadian (there is no "o"), scribes can easily use one sign (a vowel, or a syllable with a vowel) to substitute one vowel for another. In the Amarna letters, the segue adverb "now", or "now, at this time", Akkadian language 'enūma', is seldom spelled with the 'e'; instead its spellings are typically: anūma, inūma, and sometimes enūma. In both the Amarna letters and the Epic of Gilgamesh another common use of the "i" sign is for the preposition, Akkadian language ina, spelled i-na, for in, into, for, etc.. (There is an alternate cuneiform sign for ina (cuneiform), a sub-variety use of aš (cuneiform), the single, horizontal stroke.)
