= Um (cuneiform) =

Cuneiform sign

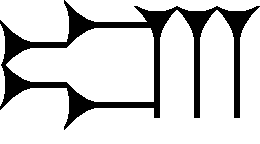
Cuneiform sign for um-(most common usage), dup, tup, ṭup, and Sumerogram DUB

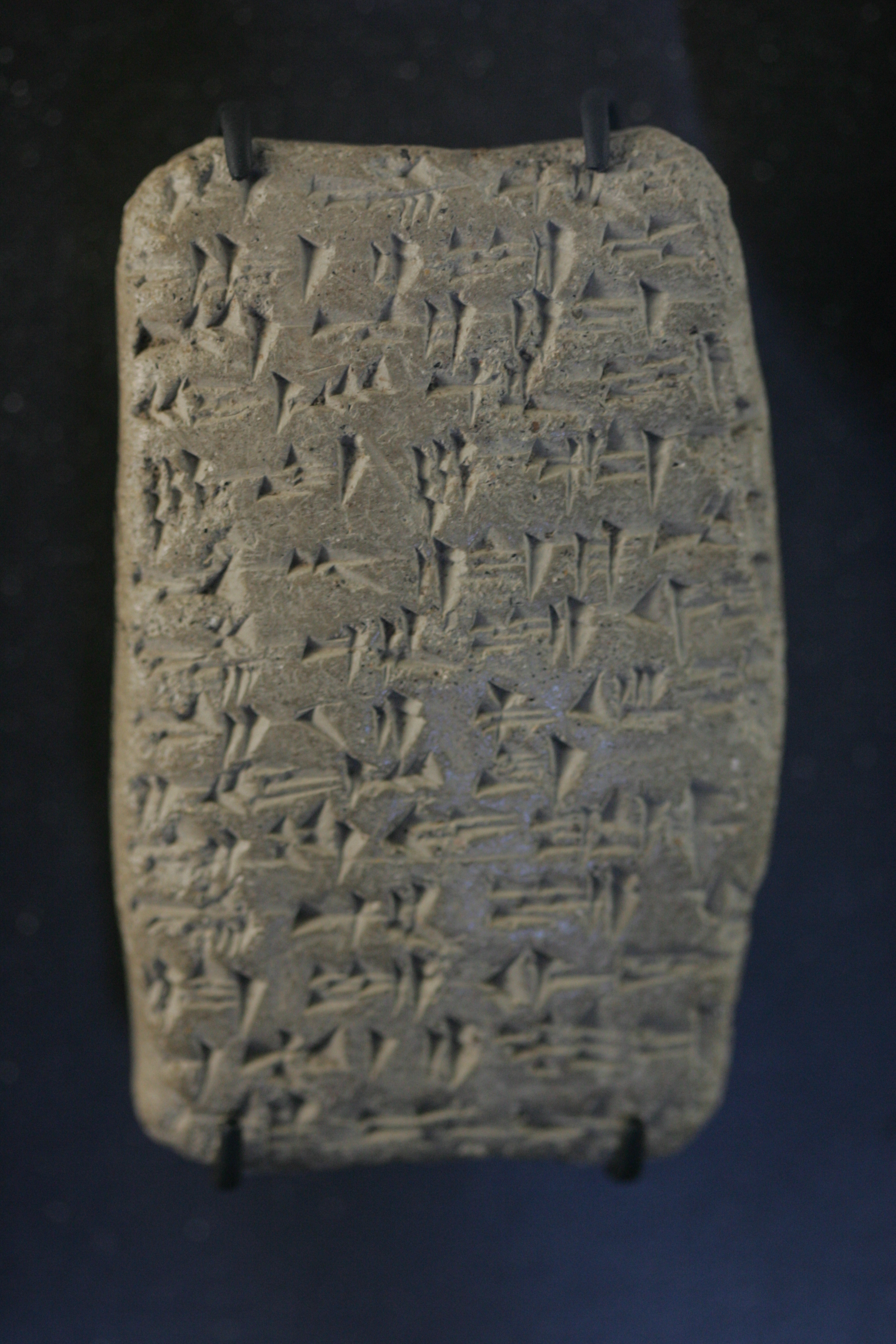
Amarna letter EA 364, Ayyab to Pharaoh. In Line 2, "um-ma", "message (thus)"...Ayyab. (high resolution, expandible photo)

The cuneiform alphabetic um sign, also dup, tup, ṭup, and DUB, the Sumerogram (logogram), for Akkadian language "ṭuppu", (= the clay tablet), is found in both the 14th century BC Amarna letters and the Epic of Gilgamesh. In the Amarna letters as um, it is found as um-ma in the introduction of the letters as "Message (thus)"...(and then the PN (personal name) of the individual sending, or authoring the letter).

In specific texts with dialogue, for example Amarna letter EA 19, Love and Gold, an extensive discussion is made by the king of Babylon about his father, ancestry, friendship between kings, envoys, women (for the harem, or wife), etc., and consequently the dialogue is preceded by um-ma ("quote"), then the dialogue by the messenger, (or the king).
