= Tu (cuneiform) =

Cuneiform sign

Cuneiform tu sign. (Sumerian)

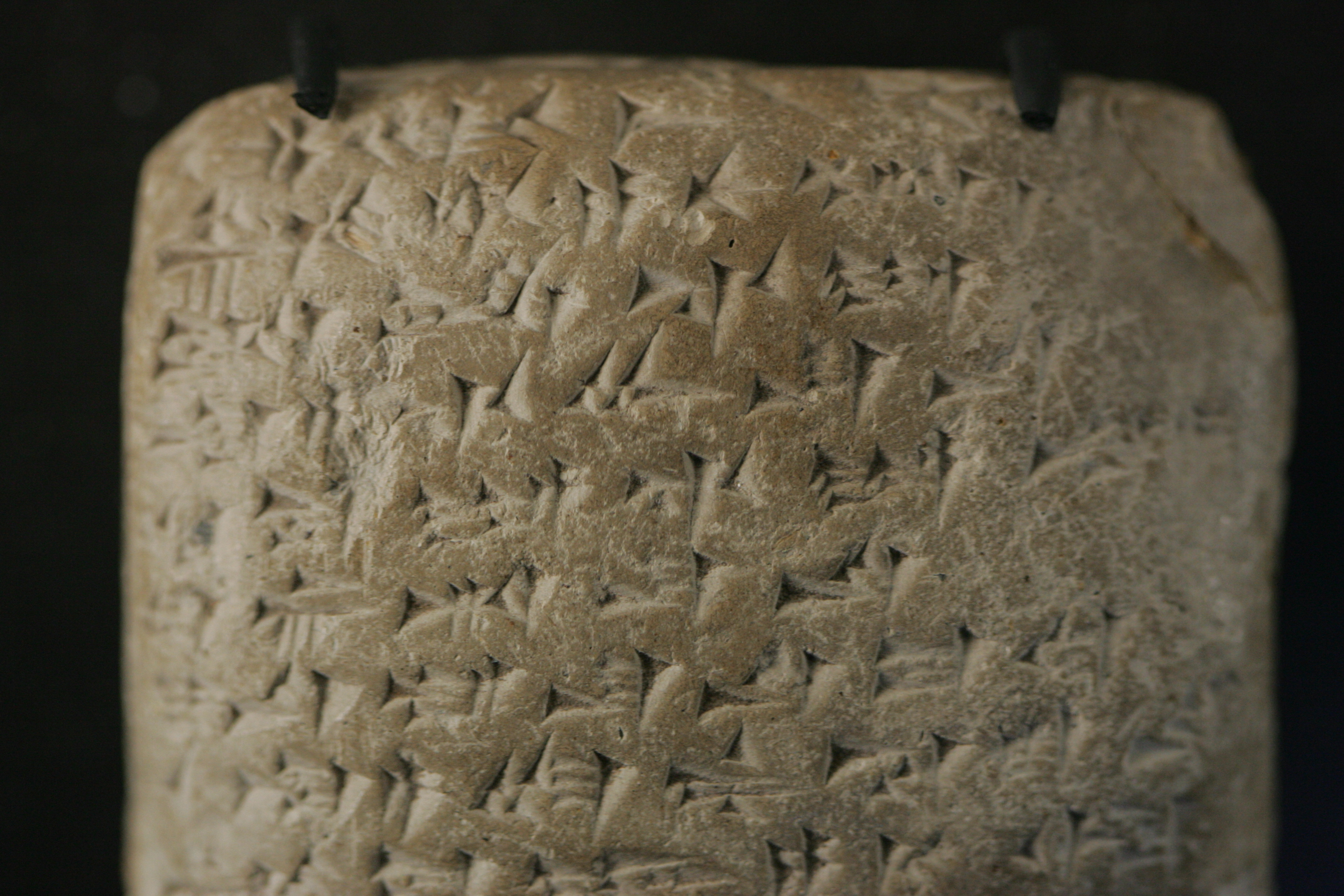
Cuneiform sign Tu, 2nd line from bottom EA 365, Reverse.

The cuneiform sign tu, and for TU-(the Sumerogram, capital letter (majuscule), in the Hittite language and other cuneiform texts, is a common-use syllabic sign for tu, and also with a syllabic use for "t", or "u". It is not a multi-use sign, with other alphabetic sub-varieties.

The Sumerian-language version is similar to the usage in the Amarna letters, with the three horizontal strokes connecting the four angled wedges on the left, and connected to the vertical horizontal single stroke, at right. Varieties exist: for example, Amarna letter EA 271 shows four horizontal long strokes, with two short strokes, between the two long ones, (see here, 2nd line from bottom (tablet Obverse): .

The Hittite language version of tu, (and ideogram TU) is identical in common form to the Sumerian.

The composition of the sign is effectively the four-wedge strokes at left, (being še (cuneiform)) connected to the rest of the cuneiform sign. Cuneiform še is also a common-use syllabic sign, with few subvarieties. (Two example angled wedges:).

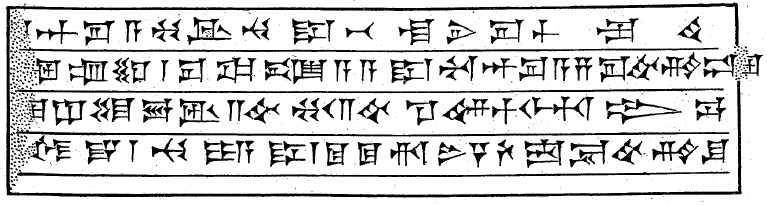
Cuneiform tu, 3rd row, 2nd cuneiform sign.

== Epic of Gilgamesh use ==
For the Epic of Gilgamesh, the following usage is found in Tablets I-XII: tu (193), tú (2), and TU (9) times. TU is used for the name of the king of Shuruppak (father of Utnapishtim), Ubara-Tutu, and it is spelled: ^{m}UBARA-^{d}TU.TU.

Two other uses of TU in the Epic are as follows: TU is also the Akkadian language verb, erēbu, for English language 'to enter', 'to set', used in Tablet III and VII. For the Sumerogram TU.MUŠEN, for Akkadian summu, the English 'dove', it is used twice in the Gilgamesh flood myth, Tablet XI.
