= Na (cuneiform) =

Cuneiform sign

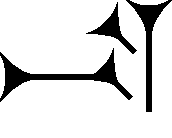
Digitized cuneiform sign for na.

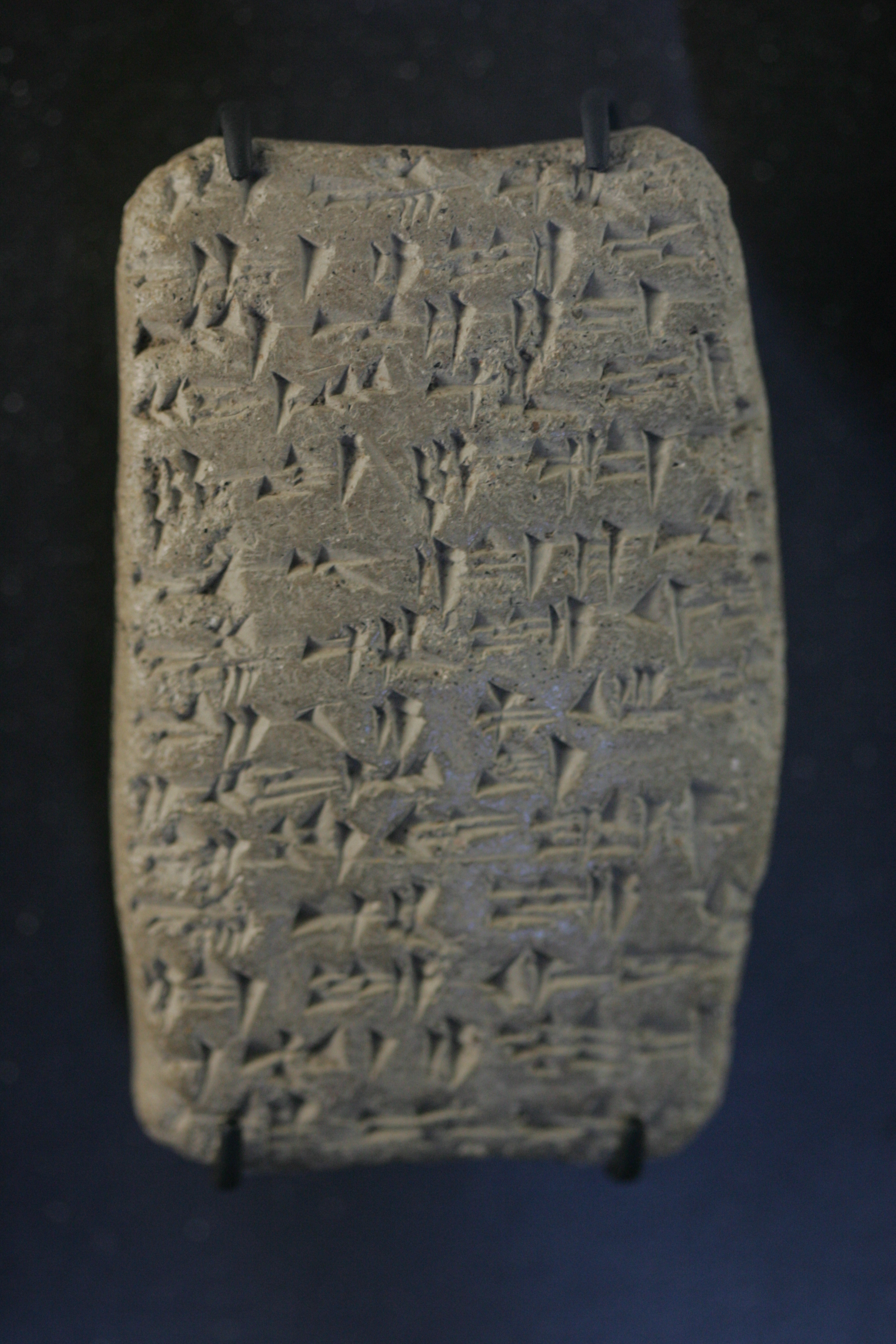
Amarna letter EA 364-(Obverse), Ayyab to Pharaoh, "Justified War"; line 1 (2nd sign for na): "To King-Lord-mine", "a-na LUGAL EN-ia". line 3: "Servant-yours, at...", "ARAD-ka, a-na...." (Note: the 2 horizontals at the right side of "ka", are barely visible, compared to the 2 well-scribed verticals) (high resolution expandable photo)

The cuneiform na sign is a common, multi-use sign, a syllabic for na, and an alphabetic sign used for n, or a; it is common in both the Epic of Gilgamesh over hundreds of years, and the 1350 BC Amarna letters. In the Epic of Gilgamesh it also has sumerogramic (capital letter (majuscule)) usage for NA. One such use of NA.GAD in the Epic (also LÚ.NA.GAD, and the plural LÚ.NA.GAD.MEŠ), for Akkadian language "nāqidu", "herdsman". The usage for NA in herdsman is only for 3 spellings.

One reason for its commodity (na is the second-most commonly found cuneiform, exceeded only by a) is due to its usage in the phrase a-na (Akkadian language "ana") -, which had a usage in English akin to: to, for, by, of, and at. It is also a component for the Akkadian language preposition: i-na (ina), meaning: in, into, by, etc..

The na sign usage from the Epic of Gilgamesh is as follows: na-(736 times), NA-(24).

== Variations of the Na cuneiform ==
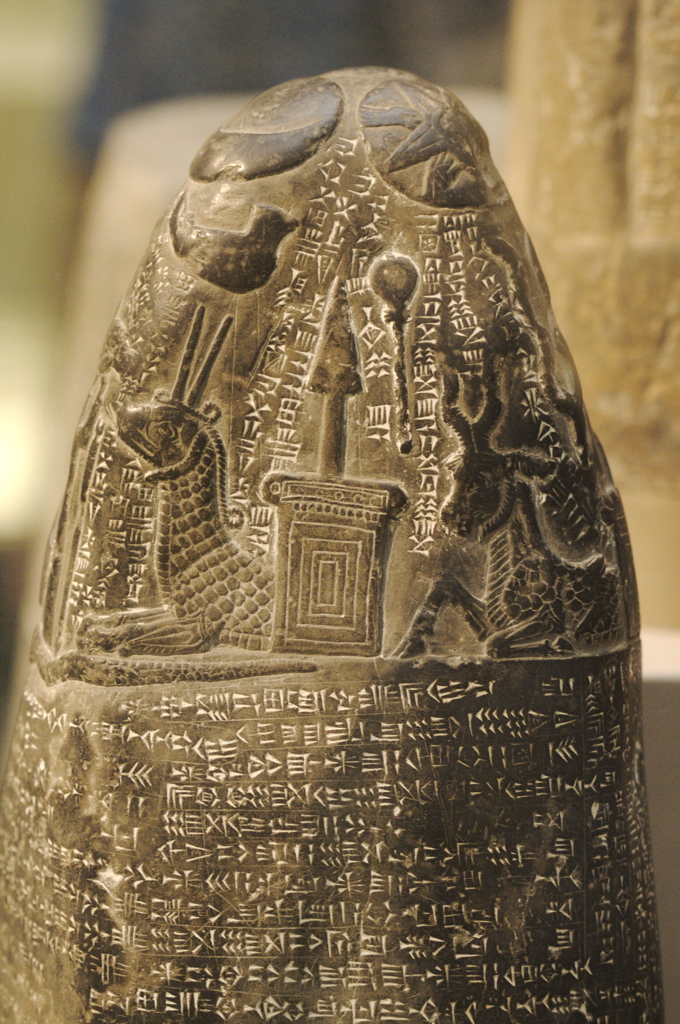
Mesopotamian kudurru at the British Museum.

In the Amarna letters, EA 205, EA 364, etc., (see here , for a medium resolution, line 3 ARAD-ka a-na, EA 364) an alternate form of na, replaces the left side of the sign with: 2-horizontals, and a small wedge above, with the vertical anchoring the right, -.

For Marduk-nadin-ahhe's kudurru at the British Museum, na is constructed approximately as follows: 1-horizontal lies at the sign's left, followed by a large wedge, then the vertical, resulting in a sign approximately as follows:.
