= Am (cuneiform) =

Cuneiform sign

The cuneiform sign am, is a common-use sign of the Amarna letters, the Epic of Gilgamesh, and other cuneiform texts (for example Hittite texts). It is also used as AM.

Linguistically, it has the alphabetical usage in texts for a, or m, or syllabically for am. The "a" is replaceable in word formation by any of the 4 vowels: a, e, i, or u.

== Epic of Gilgamesh usage ==
The am sign usage in the Epic of Gilgamesh is as follows: am-(87 times); AM-(4).
