= Satatna =

Mayor/Ruler of Akka

King of Akka
- Reign: c. 1350 - c. 1335 BC
- Died: c. 1335 BC
- Father: Saratum

Satatna (died c. 1335 BC) was the ruler of the city-state of Akka. At the time the city was a vassal of Egypt.

== Reign ==
Satatna (or Sitatna,Šutatna/Shutatna) was the ruler of Akka.

=== Amarna Letters ===
In the Amarna Archive, Satatna was the author of three letters (EA 233-235) to the Pharaoh. He is also mentioned letters by Bayadi a mayor in Syria (EA 238) and Burna-Buriash of Karduniash (Babylon) (EA 8).

Amarna Letter EA 08. In a letter by Burna-Buriash addressed to "Naphu'rure" of Egypt (Akhenaten or Tutankhamen), he is complaining about his merchants being detained in Canaan. He states "After Ahu-tabu went to my brother, in Hinnatuna of Canaan, Sum-Adda, the son of Balumme, and Sutatna, the son of Saratum of Akka, sent their men, killed my merchants and took away their money".

A list of Satatna authored letters is as follows:

1. EA 233—title: "Work in progress"
2. EA 234—title: "Like Magdalu in Egypt". See: commissioner: Šuta.
3. EA 235—title: "An order for glass"

==== EA 233, "Work in progress" ====
Say to the king, [m]y [lord], the Sun from [the sky]: Message of Satatna the ruler of Akka, your servant, the servant of the king and the dirt at his feet and the ground on which he treads, I prostrate myself at the feet of the king, my lord, my god, the Sun from the sky, 7 times and 7 times, both on the stomach and on the back. He is obeying what the king, my lord, has written to his servant, and preparing everything that my lord has order[ed]. —EA 233, lines 1-20 (complete)

==== EA 234, "Like Magdalu in Egypt" ====
See: Egyptian commissioner: Šuta.

==== EA 235, "An order for glass" ====
Say to the king, my lord, my Sun, my god, the Sun from the sky: Message of Sitatna, your servant, the dirt at your feet. (I pr)ostrate myself at the feet of the king, my lord, my Sun, my god, 7 times and 7 times. ((at the feet of the king, my lord))-(emphasis-?). [I] have obeyed the [or]ders of the king's comm[issioner] to me, to guard the citie[s f]or the king, my lord. I have guarded very carefully. M[oreover], the king, my lord has wri[tten] to me for glass, [and] I herewith send 50 (units), [their] weight-(i.e. I herewith send: "50–weight"), to the king, my lord. —EA 235 (join of EA 327), lines 1-21 (complete)-(Note: reduces 382 Amarna letters to 381 (!))

See: Pu-Ba'lu for another letter concerning glass-(EA 314, "A shipment of glass"). Also see: Yidya, letter EA 323, "A royal order for glass".

== See also ==
- Pu-Ba'lu, glass letter
- Yidya, glass letter
- Amarna letters
