= Pu-Ba'lu =

Ruler of Yursa

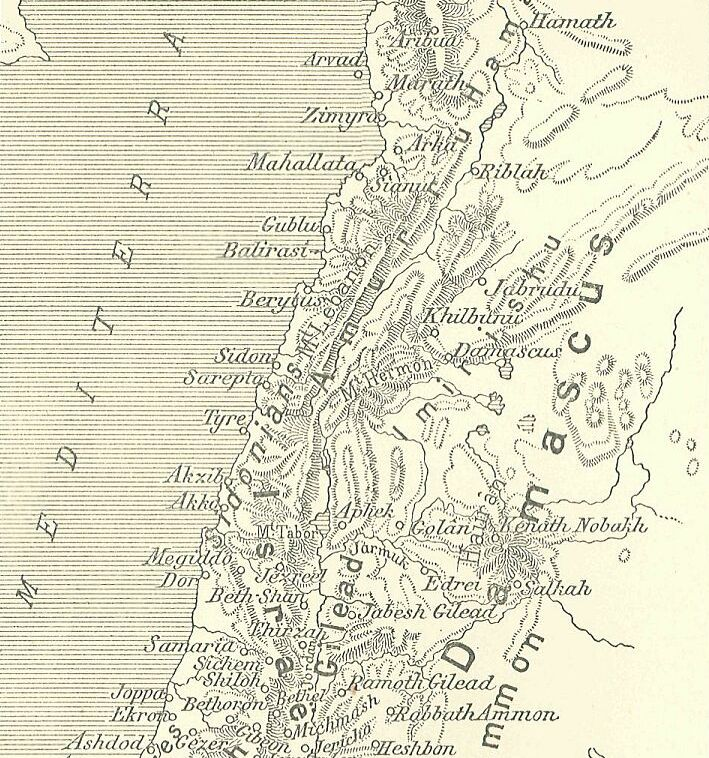

Pu-Baʿlu or Pu-Baʕlu (also Pu-Baḫla) was ruler/mayor of Yursa, a city-state in Canaan that is identified with Tell Jemmeh, of the 1350–1335 BC Amarna letters. His name translates in West Semitic as well as in Akkadian as 'word/mouth (of) Baal', 'Spokesman (of) Baal', or 'Baal's voice'.

Pu-Baʿlu of Yursa is the author of three letters to Akhenaten, the pharaoh of the New Kingdom of Egypt.

The three Amarna letters, (EA for 'el Amarna') to the Pharaoh from Pu-Baʿlu are:

EA 314—Title: "A shipment of glass"
EA 315—Title: "Like a command of the Sun" – see: Reanap
EA 316—Title: "Postscript to the royal scribe" – see: Tahmašši

Of the entire Amarna letters 382–letter text corpus, Pu-Ba'lu of Yursa is only referenced in letters 314 and 315, as "Pu-Ba'lu, the ruler of Yursa", and EA 316, as "Pu-Ba'lu". One other reference in EA 104, entitled "Ullassa taken", is to Abdi-Ashirta's son, "Pu-Bahla", presumably a separate 'Pu-Baal'.

== Example letter of Pu-Ba'lu ==
=== EA 314, "A shipment of glass" ===
To the king-(i.e. Pharaoh), my lord, my god, my Sun, the Sun from the sky: Message of Pu-Ba'lu, your servant, the ruler of Yursa. I indeed prostrate myself at the feet of the king, my lord, my god, my Sun: the Sun from the sky, 7 times and 7 times, on the back and on the belly. I am indeed guarding the place of the king, (my) lord, my Sun, the Sun from the sky. Who is the dog g that would not o]be[y the orders of the king, the Sun from the sk]y? [Since the king, my lord, has ord[ere[d] some glass, I [s]end it to the king, my lord, my god, the Sun from the sk[y]. —EA -314, lines 1-22 (with damaged cuneiform characters)

EA 235, entitled: "An order of glass", is of the same subject, a letter from Satatna of Akka. See also the same subject glass: Yidya of Ašqaluna, EA 323; see: Yidya.

== See also ==
- Amarna letters localities and rulers
- Amarna letter EA 323
- Satatna, and Yidya
