= Yursa =

Yursa was a town from the 1350–1335 BC Amarna letters correspondence. The site, a city/city-state, is probably in the southern Canaan close to Gaza. Some scholars identify it with Tell Jemmeh.

In the 382–letter correspondence it is the location of its mayor/ruler, Pu-Ba'lu, who authored 3 letters written to the pharaoh, namely EA 314-316, (EA for 'el Amarna').

The three letters to the pharaoh from Pu-Ba'lu of Yursa are:

EA 314—Title: "A shipment of glass"
EA 315—Title: "Like a command of the Sun"–See: Reanap
EA 316—Title: "Postscript to the royal scribe"–See: Tahmašši

Of the entire Amarna letters 382–letter corpus, Yursa is only referenced in letters 314, and 315, as: "..Pu-Ba'lu, the ruler of Yursa".

== Example letter of Yursa/Pu-Ba'lu ==
=== EA 314, title: "A shipment of glass" ===
"To the king (i.e. Pharaoh), my lord, my god, my Sun, the Sun from the sky: Message of Pu-Ba'lu, your servant, the ruler of Yursa. I indeed prostrate myself at the feet of the king, my lord, my god, my Sun: the Sun from the sky. 7 times and 7 times, on the back and on the stomach. I am indeed guarding the place of the king, (my) lord, my Sun, the Sun from the sky. Who is the dog that would not o]be[y the orders of the king, the Sun from the sk]y? [Since the king, my lord, has ord[ere[d] some glass, I [s]end it to the king, my lord, my god, the Sun from the sk[y]."

EA-314, lines 1-22 (with damaged cuneiform characters)

EA 235, entitled: "An order of glass", is of the same subject, a letter from Satatna of Akka-(Acco).

== See also ==
- Pu-Ba'lu
- Reanap, Egyptian commissioner
- Tahmašši, Egyptian official
- Amarna letters
- Amarna letters–phrases and quotations, for: "7 times and 7 times; "on the back and on the stomach" "
