= Anubis =

Ancient Egyptian god of funerary rites

- The Egyptian god Anubis, (a modern rendition inspired by New Kingdom tomb paintings)
Name in hieroglyphs
i n p w E16
- Major cult center: Lycopolis, Cynopolis
- Symbol: Mummy gauze, fetish, jackal, flail

Genealogy
- Parents: Nephthys and Osiris (Middle and New kingdom), or Ra (Old kingdom), or Set (disputed)
- Siblings: Bata
- Consort: Anput, Nephthys
- Offspring: Kebechet

Equivalents
- Greek: Hades or Hermes

Anubis (/əˈnjuːbɪs/; Ancient Greek: Ἄνουβις), also known as Inpu, Inpw, Jnpw, or Anpu in Ancient Egyptian (Coptic: ⲁⲛⲟⲩⲡ, romanized: Anoup), is the god of funerary rites, protector of graves, and guide to the underworld in ancient Egyptian religion, usually depicted as a canine or a man with a canine head.

Like many ancient Egyptian deities, Anubis assumed different roles in various contexts. Depicted as a protector of graves as early as the First Dynasty (c. 3100 – c. 2890 BC), Anubis was also an embalmer. By the Middle Kingdom (c. 2055–1650 BC), he was replaced by Osiris in his role as lord of the underworld. One of his prominent roles was as a god who ushered souls into the afterlife. He attended the weighing scale during the "Weighing of the Heart", in which it was determined whether a soul would be allowed to enter the realm of the dead. Anubis is one of the most frequently depicted and mentioned gods in the Egyptian pantheon; however, few major myths involved him.

Anubis was depicted in black, a color that symbolized regeneration, life, the soil of the Nile River, and the discoloration of the corpse after embalming. Anubis is associated with Wepwawet, another Egyptian god portrayed with a dog's head or in canine form, but with grey or white fur. Historians assume that the two figures were eventually combined. Anubis's female counterpart is Anput. His daughter is the serpent goddess Kebechet.

== Name ==
Anubis as a jackal perched atop a tomb, symbolizing his protection of the necropolis

"Anubis" is a Greek rendering of this god's Egyptian name. Before the Greeks arrived in Egypt, around the 7th century BC, the god was known as Anpu or Inpu. The root of the name in ancient Egyptian language means "a royal child." Inpu has a root to "inp", which means "to decay." The god was also known as "First of the Westerners," "Lord of the Sacred Land," "He Who is Upon his Sacred Mountain," "Ruler of the Nine Bows," "The Dog who Swallows Millions," "Master of Secrets," "He Who is in the Place of Embalming," and "Foremost of the Divine Booth." The positions that he had were also reflected in the titles he held such as "He Who Is upon His Mountain," "Lord of the Sacred Land," "Foremost of the Westerners," and "He Who Is in the Place of Embalming."

In the Old Kingdom (c. 2686 BC – c. 2181 BC), the standard way of writing his name in hieroglyphs was composed of the sound signs inpw followed by a jackal (Note: The canid which Anubis was modeled upon has frequently been stated to have been the golden jackal, though the African variant of this animal present in Egypt was reclassified in 2015 as a separate species now known as the African wolf, which was found to be more closely related to wolves and coyotes than to the jackal. Some authors have opined that Anubis is more probably modeled after a fox or Ethiopian wolf. Nevertheless, ancient Greek texts about Anubis consistently refer to the deity as having the head of a dog rather than that of any wild canid, and there is still uncertainty as to what species represents Anubis. Therefore the Name and History section uses the names the original sources used but in quotation marks.) over a ḥtp sign:

i n p w C6

A new form with the jackal on a tall stand appeared in the late Old Kingdom and became common thereafter:

i n p w E16

Anubis's name jnpw was possibly pronounced [aˈna.pʰa(w)], based on Coptic Anoup and the Akkadian transcription ⟨a-na-pa⟩ (𒀀𒈾𒉺) in the name <ri-a-na-pa> "Reanapa" that appears in Amarna letter EA 315. However, this transcription may also be interpreted as rˁ-nfr, a name similar to that of Prince Ranefer of the Fourth Dynasty.

== History ==
In Egypt's Early Dynastic period (c. 3100 – c. 2686 BC), Anubis was portrayed in full animal form, with a "jackal" head and body. A jackal god, probably Anubis, is depicted in stone inscriptions from the reigns of Hor-Aha, Djer, and other pharaohs of the First Dynasty. Since Predynastic Egypt, when the dead were buried in shallow graves, jackals had been strongly associated with cemeteries because they were scavengers that uncovered human bodies and ate their flesh. In the spirit of "fighting like with like," a jackal was chosen to protect the dead, because "a common problem (and cause of concern) must have been the digging up of bodies, shortly after burial, by jackals and other wild dogs which lived on the margins of the cultivation."

In the Old Kingdom, Anubis was the most important god of the dead. He was replaced in that role by Osiris during the Middle Kingdom (2000–1700 BC). In the Roman era, which started in 30 BC, tomb paintings depict him holding the hand of deceased persons to guide them to Osiris.

The parentage of Anubis varied between myths, times and sources. In early mythology, he was portrayed as a son of Ra. In the Coffin Texts, which were written in the First Intermediate Period (c. 2181–2055 BC), Anubis is the son of either the cow goddess Hesat or the cat-headed Bastet. Another tradition depicted him as the son of Ra and Nephthys. More commonly, however, he is recognized as the offspring of Osiris and Isis. In later periods, particularly during the Ptolemaic era, Anubis was sometimes described as the son of Isis and Serapis, a Hellenized form of Osiris designed to appeal to Egypt's growing Greek population. The Greek Plutarch (c. 40–120 AD) reported a tradition that Anubis was the illegitimate son of Nephthys and Osiris, but that he was adopted by Osiris's wife Isis:

For when Isis found out that Osiris loved her sister and had relations with her in mistaking her sister for herself, and when she saw a proof of it in the form of a garland of clover that he had left to Nephthys – she was looking for a baby, because Nephthys abandoned it at once after it had been born for fear of Set; and when Isis found the baby helped by the dogs which with great difficulties lead her there, she raised him and he became her guard and ally by the name of Anubis.

George Hart sees this story as an "attempt to incorporate the independent deity Anubis into the Osirian pantheon." An Egyptian papyrus from the Roman period (30–380 AD) simply called Anubis the "son of Isis." In Nubia, Anubis was seen as the husband of his mother Nephthys.

In the Ptolemaic period (350–30 BC), when Egypt became a Hellenistic kingdom ruled by Greek pharaohs, Anubis was merged with the Greek god Hermes, becoming Hermanubis. The two gods were considered similar because they both guided souls to the afterlife. The center of this cult was in uten-ha/Sa-ka/ Cynopolis, a place whose Greek name means "city of dogs." In Book XI of The Golden Ass by Apuleius, there is evidence that the worship of this god was continued in Rome through at least the 2nd century. Indeed, Hermanubis also appears in the alchemical and hermetical literature of the Middle Ages and the Renaissance.

Although the Greeks and Romans typically scorned Egyptian animal-headed gods as bizarre and primitive (Anubis was mockingly called "Barker" by the Greeks), Anubis was sometimes associated with Sirius in the heavens and Cerberus and Hades in the underworld. In his dialogues, Plato often has Socrates utter oaths "by the dog" (Greek: kai me ton kuna), "by the dog of Egypt", and "by the dog, the god of the Egyptians", both for emphasis and to appeal to Anubis as an arbiter of truth in the underworld.

== Roles ==
=== Embalmer ===
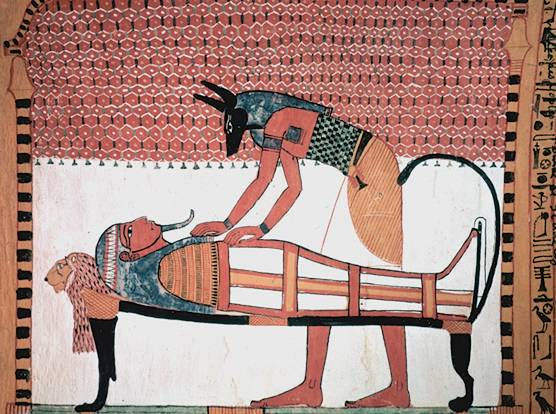
Anubis attending the mummy of the deceased.

As jmy-wt (Imiut or the Imiut fetish) "He who is in the place of embalming", Anubis was associated with mummification. He was also called ḫnty zḥ-nṯr "He who presides over the god's booth", in which "booth" could refer either to the place where embalming was carried out or the pharaoh's burial chamber.

In the Osiris myth, Anubis helped Isis to embalm Osiris. Indeed, when the Osiris myth emerged, it was said that after Osiris had been killed by Set, Osiris's organs were given to Anubis as a gift. With this connection, Anubis became the patron god of embalmers; during the rites of mummification, illustrations from the Book of the Dead often show a wolf-mask-wearing priest supporting the upright mummy.

=== Protector of tombs ===
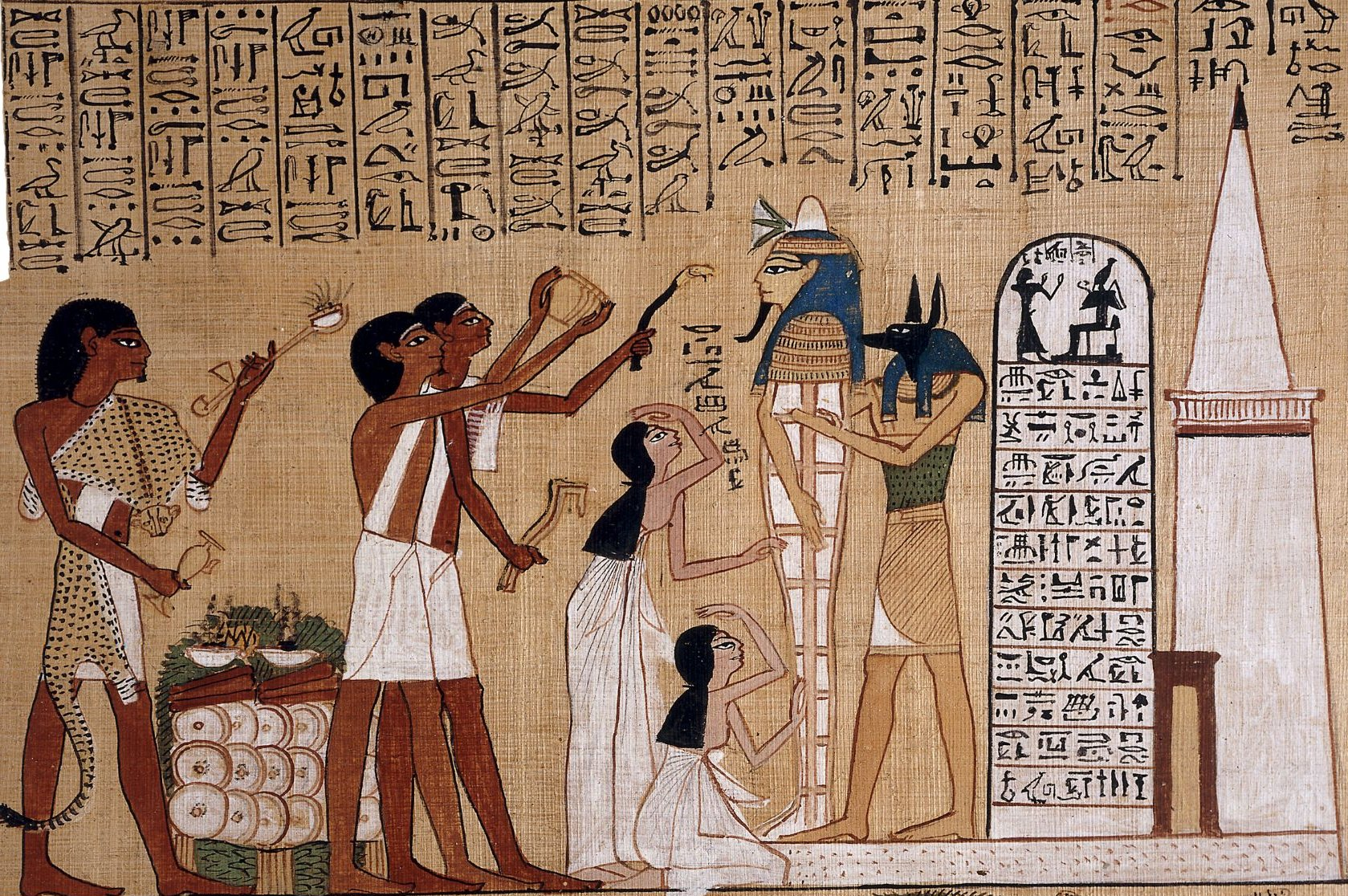
The Opening of the Mouth ceremony being performed on a mummy before the tomb. Anubis attending the mummy of the deceased. Extract from the Papyrus of Hunefer, a 19th-Dynasty Book of the Dead (c. 1300 BC)

Anubis was a protector of graves and cemeteries. Several epithets attached to his name in Egyptian texts and inscriptions referred to that role. Khenty-Amentiu, which means "foremost of the westerners" and was also the name of a different canine funerary god, alluded to his protecting function because the dead were usually buried on the west bank of the Nile. He took other names in connection with his funerary role, such as tpy-ḏw.f (Tepy-djuef) "He who is upon his mountain" (i.e. keeping guard over tombs from above) and nb-t3-ḏsr (Neb-ta-djeser) "Lord of the sacred land", which designates him as a god of the desert necropolis.

The Jumilhac papyrus recounts another tale where Anubis protected the body of Osiris from Set. Set attempted to attack the body of Osiris by transforming himself into a leopard. Anubis stopped and subdued Set, however, and he branded Set's skin with a hot iron rod. Anubis then flayed Set and wore his skin as a warning against evil-doers who would desecrate the tombs of the dead. Priests who attended to the dead wore leopard skin in order to commemorate Anubis's victory over Set. The legend of Anubis branding the hide of Set in leopard form was used to explain how the leopard got its spots.

Most ancient tombs had prayers to Anubis carved on them.

=== Guide of souls ===
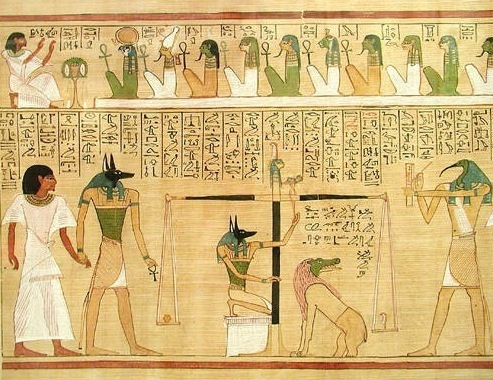
The "weighing of the heart," from the book of the dead of Hunefer. Anubis is portrayed as guiding the deceased forward and manipulating the scales, under the scrutiny of the ibis-headed Thoth.

By the late pharaonic era (664–332 BC), Anubis was often depicted as guiding individuals across the threshold from the world of the living to the afterlife. Though a similar role was sometimes performed by the cow-headed Hathor, Anubis was more commonly chosen to fulfill that function. Greek writers from the Roman period of Egyptian history designated that role as that of "psychopomp", a Greek term meaning "guide of souls" that they used to refer to their own god Hermes, who also played that role in Greek religion. Funerary art from that period represents Anubis guiding either men or women dressed in Greek clothes into the presence of Osiris, who by then had long replaced Anubis as ruler of the underworld.

=== Weigher of hearts ===
One of the roles of Anubis was as the "Guardian of the Scales." The critical scene depicting the weighing of the heart, in the Book of the Dead, shows Anubis performing a measurement that determined whether the person was worthy of entering the realm of the dead (the underworld, known as Duat). By weighing the heart of a deceased person against ma'at, who was often represented as an ostrich feather, Anubis dictated the fate of souls. Souls heavier than a feather would be devoured by Ammit, and souls lighter than a feather would ascend to a heavenly existence.

== Portrayal in art ==
Anubis was one of the most frequently represented deities in ancient Egyptian art. He is depicted in royal tombs as early as the First Dynasty. The god is typically treating a king's corpse, providing sovereign to mummification rituals and funerals, or standing with fellow gods at the Weighing of the Heart of the Soul in the Hall of Two Truths. One of his most popular representations is of him, with the body of a man and the head of a jackal with pointed ears, standing or kneeling, holding a gold scale while a heart of the soul is being weighed against Ma'at's white truth feather.

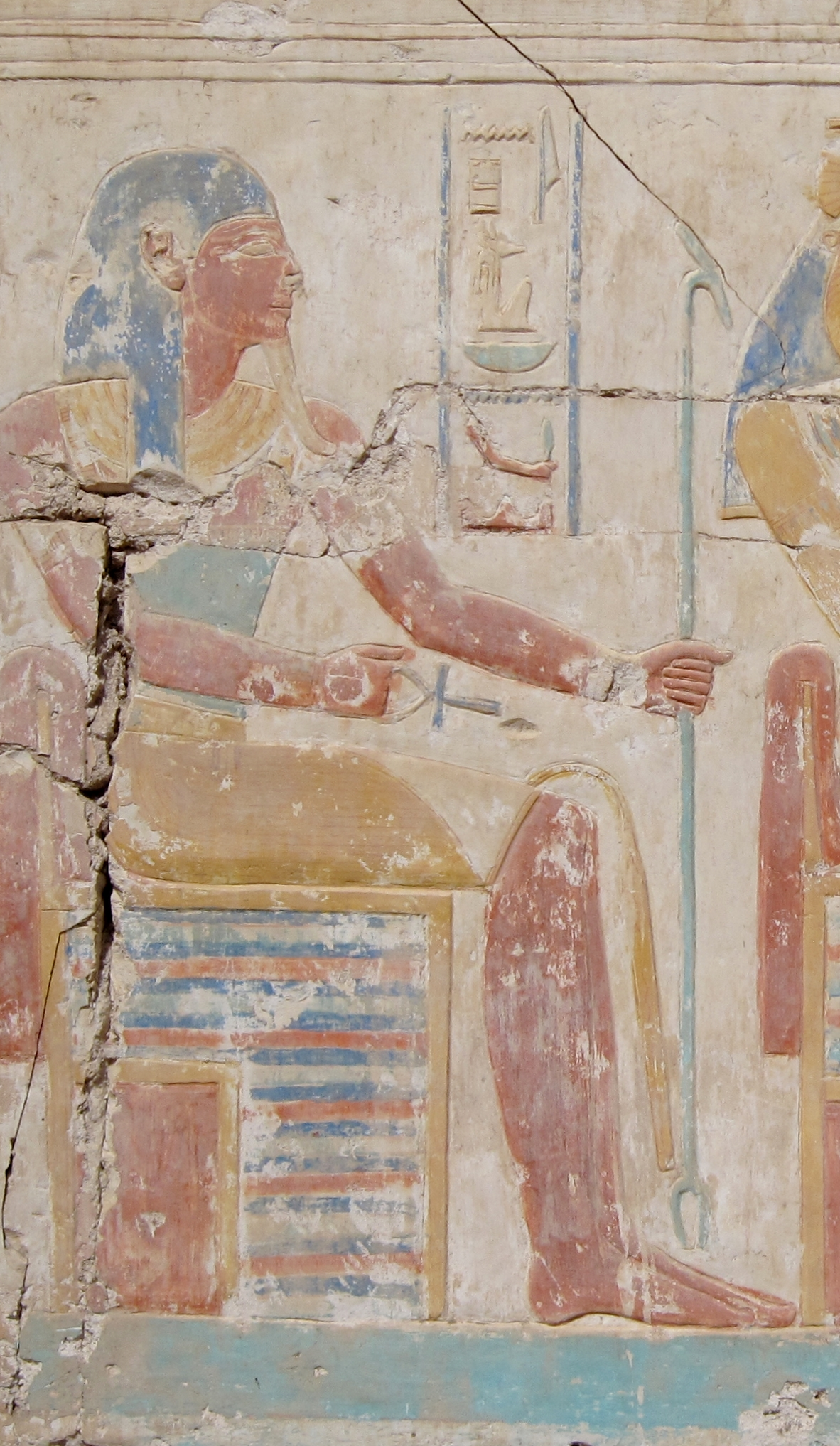
Anubis in a fully humanoid form, Ramesses II temple, Abydos, Egypt.

In the early dynastic period, he was depicted in animal form, as a black canine. Anubis's distinctive black color did not represent the animal, rather it had several symbolic meanings. It represented "the discolouration of the corpse after its treatment with natron and the smearing of the wrappings with a resinous substance during mummification." Being the color of the fertile silt of the River Nile, to Egyptians, black also symbolized fertility and the possibility of rebirth in the afterlife. In the Middle Kingdom, Anubis was often portrayed as a man with the head of a jackal. The African jackal was the species depicted and the template of numerous Ancient Egyptian deities, including Anubis. An extremely rare depiction of him in fully human form was found in a chapel of Ramesses II in Abydos.

Anubis is often depicted wearing a ribbon and holding a nḫ3ḫ3 "flail" in the crook of his arm. Another of Anubis's attributes was the jmy-wt or imiut fetish, named for his role in embalming. In funerary contexts, Anubis is shown either attending to a deceased person's mummy or sitting atop a tomb protecting it. New Kingdom tomb-seals also depict Anubis sitting atop the nine bows that symbolize his domination over the enemies of Egypt.

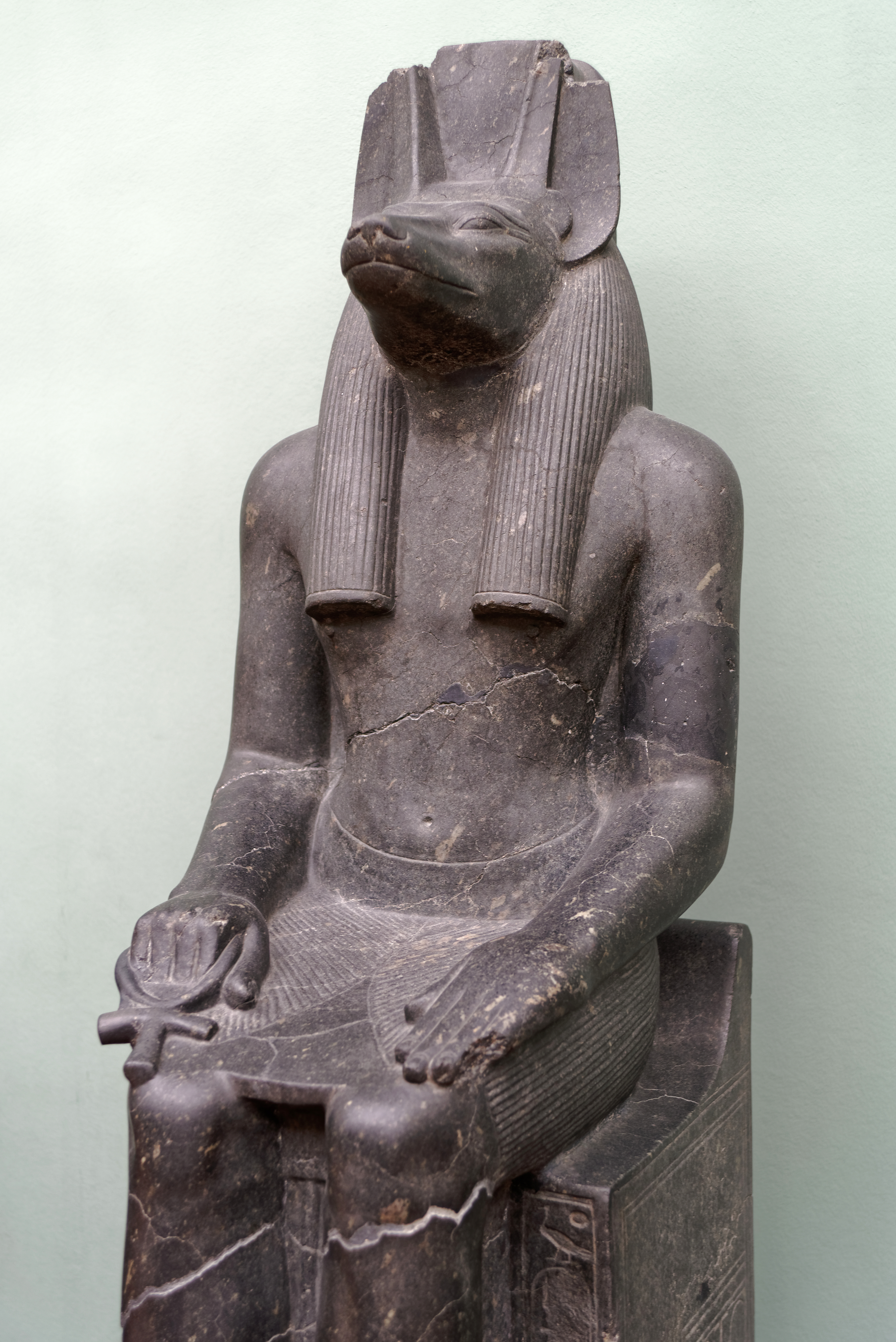
Statue of Anubis

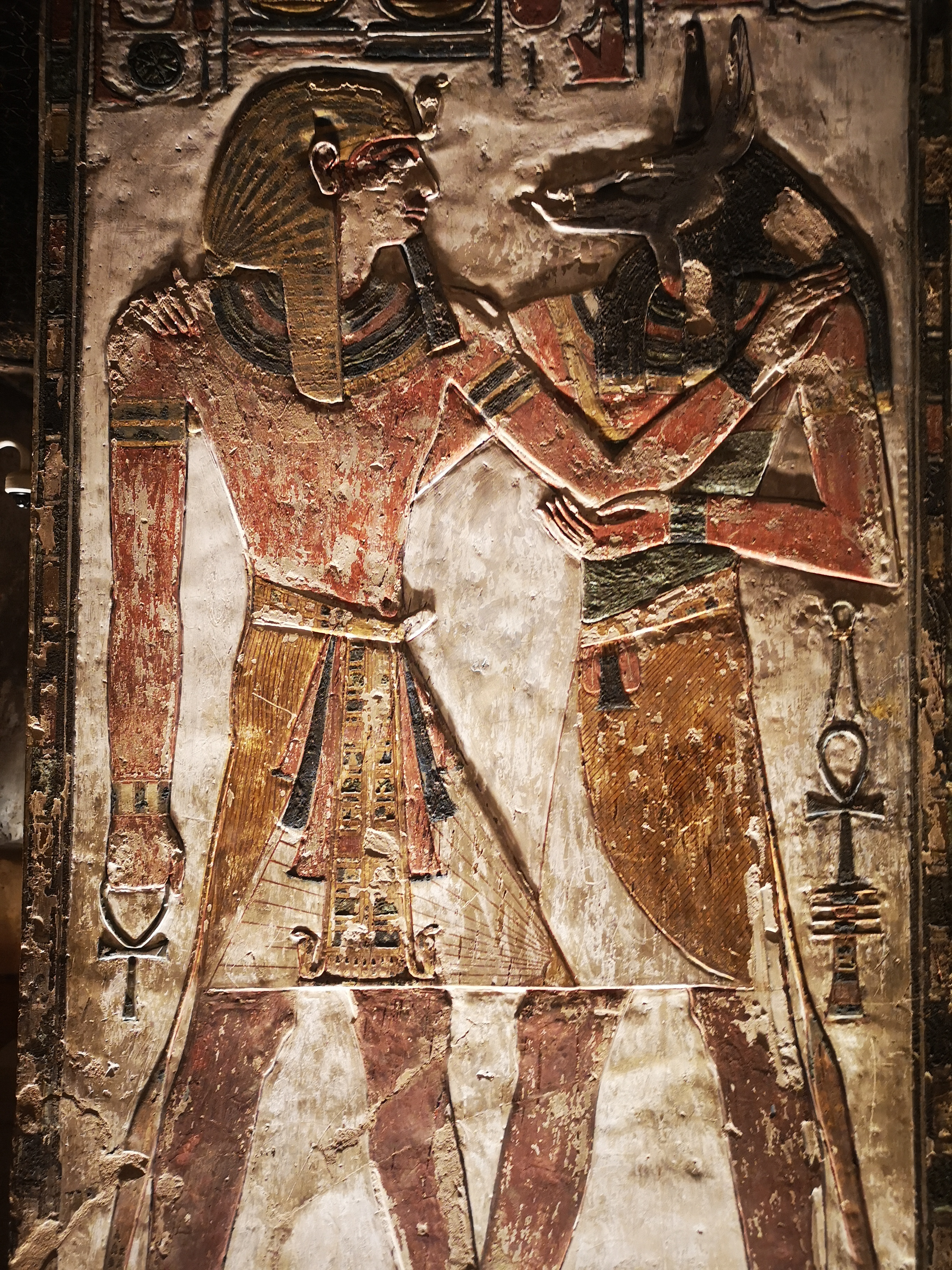
Wall relief of Anubis in (KV17) the tomb of Seti I, 19th Dynasty, Valley of the Kings

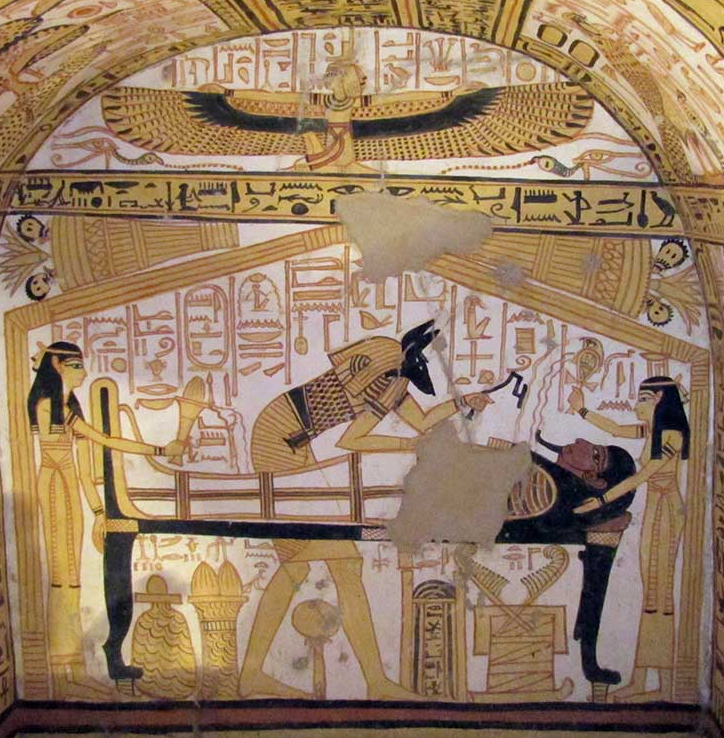
Isis, left, and Nephthys stand by as Anubis embalms the deceased, 13th century BC

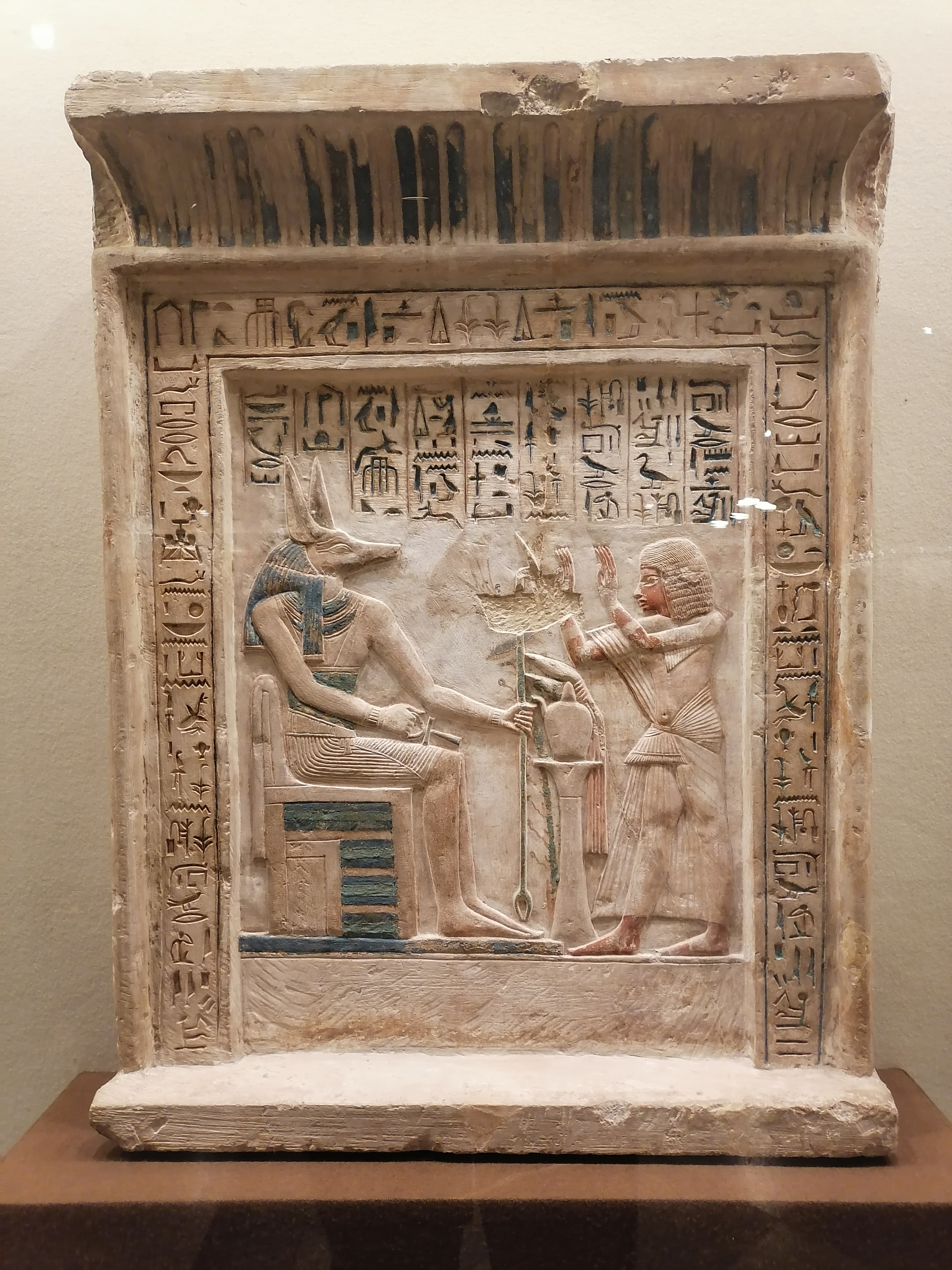
Anubis receiving offerings, hieroglyph name in third column from left, 14th century BC; painted limestone; from Saqqara (Egypt)

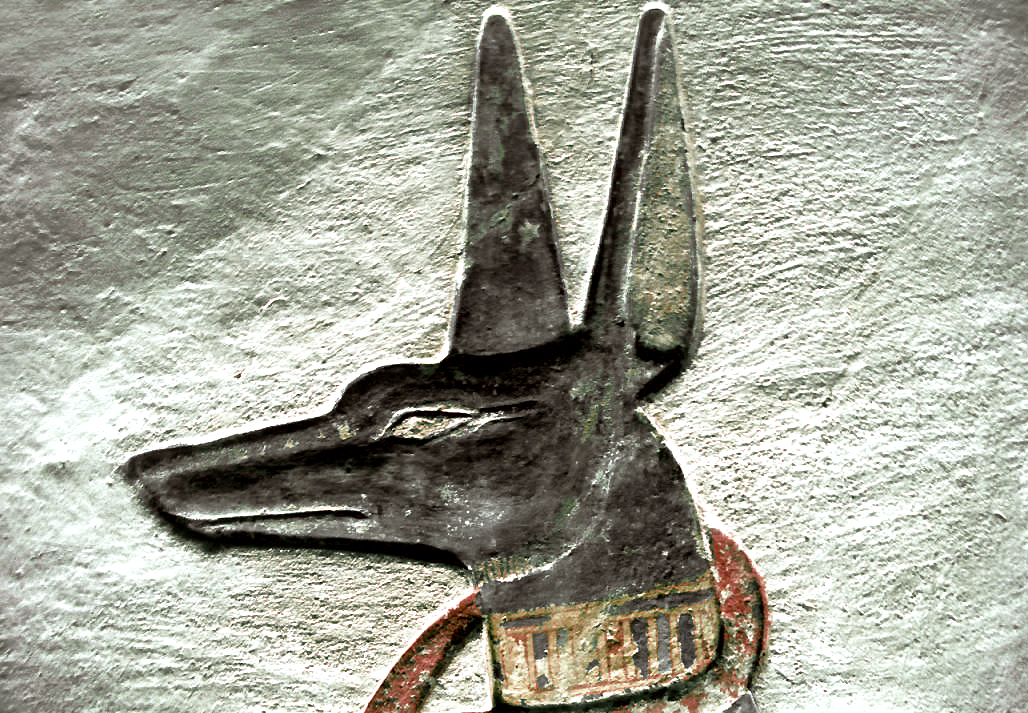
Jackal head of Anubis in (KV35) the tomb of Amenophis II, Valley of the Kings

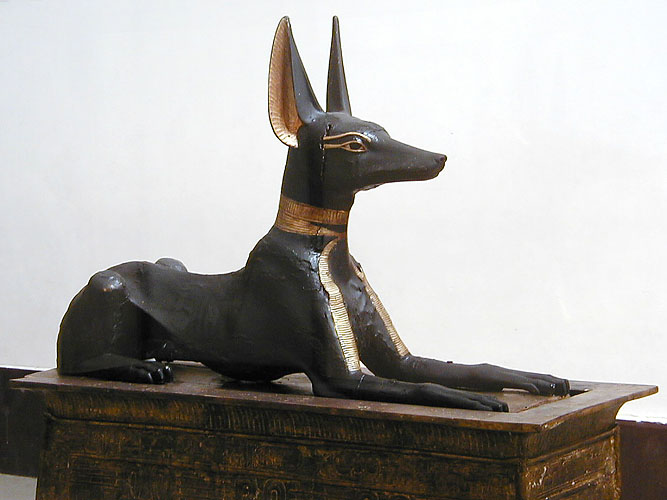
The Anubis Shrine; 1336–1327 BC; painted wood and gold; 1.1 × 2.7 × 0.52 m; from the Valley of the Kings; Egyptian Museum (Cairo)

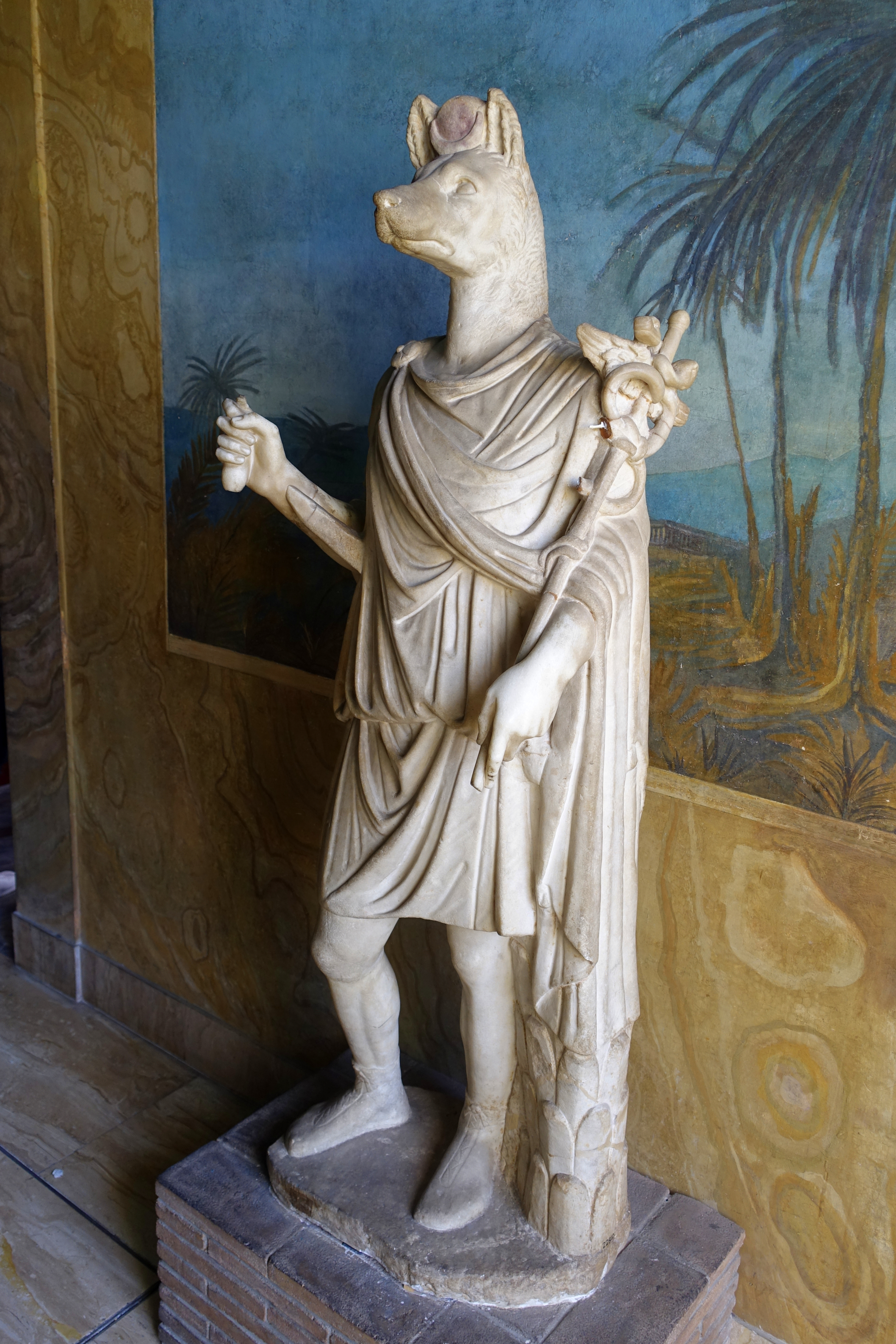
Statue of Hermanubis, c. 100–138 AD, from Rome

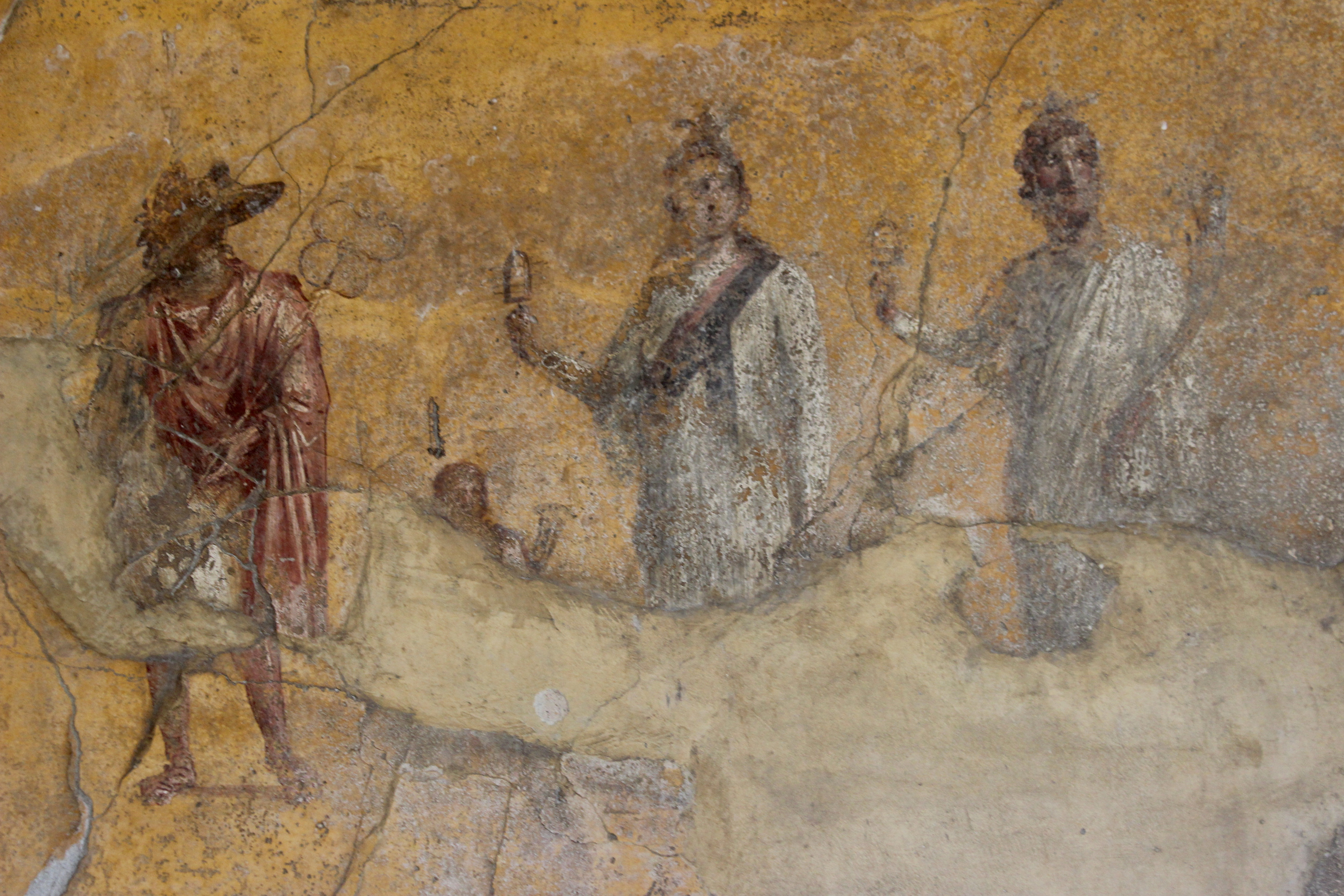
Anubis, Harpocrates, Isis and Serapis, antique fresco in Pompeii, Italy

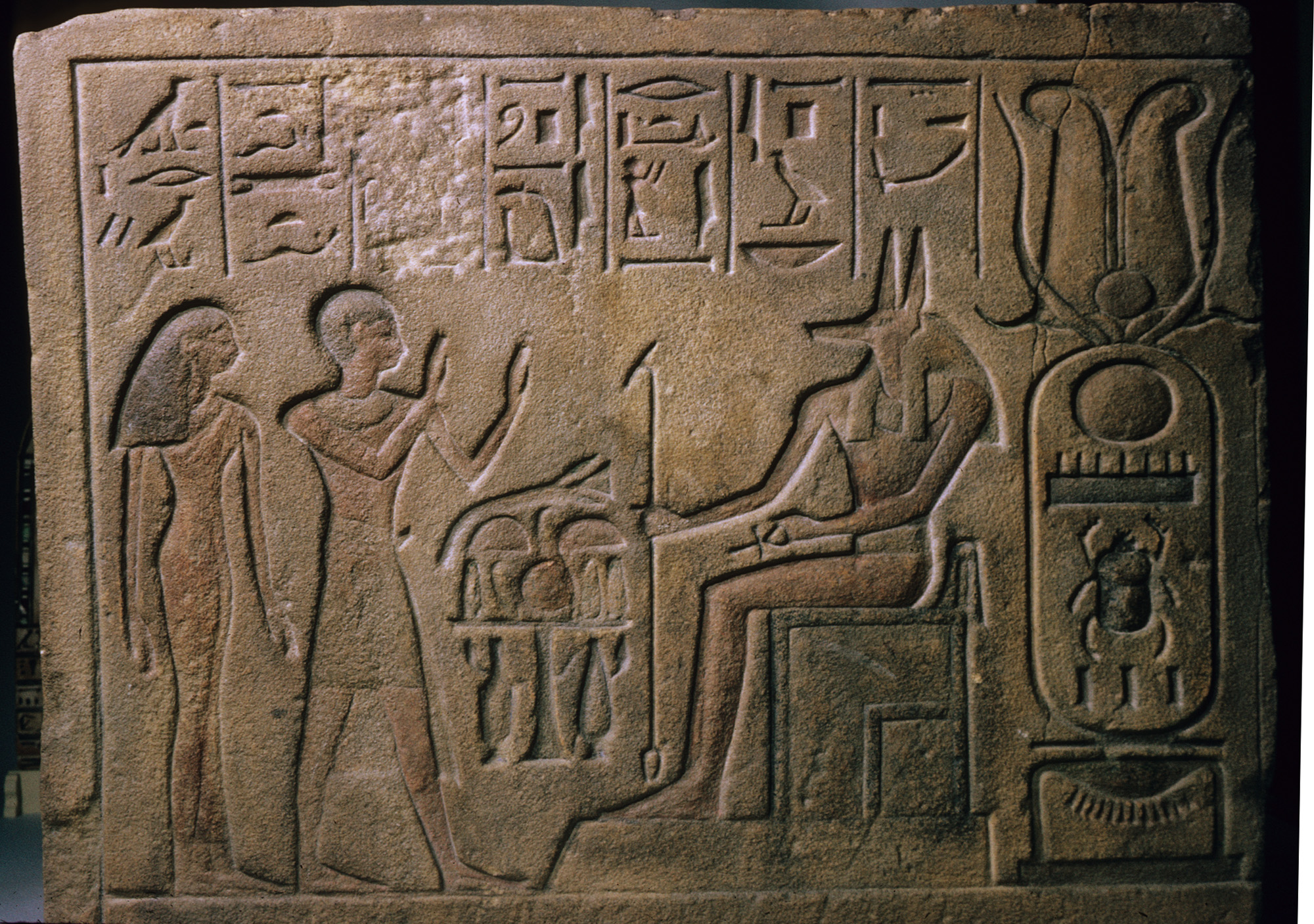
Stela of Siamun and Taruy worshipping Anubis

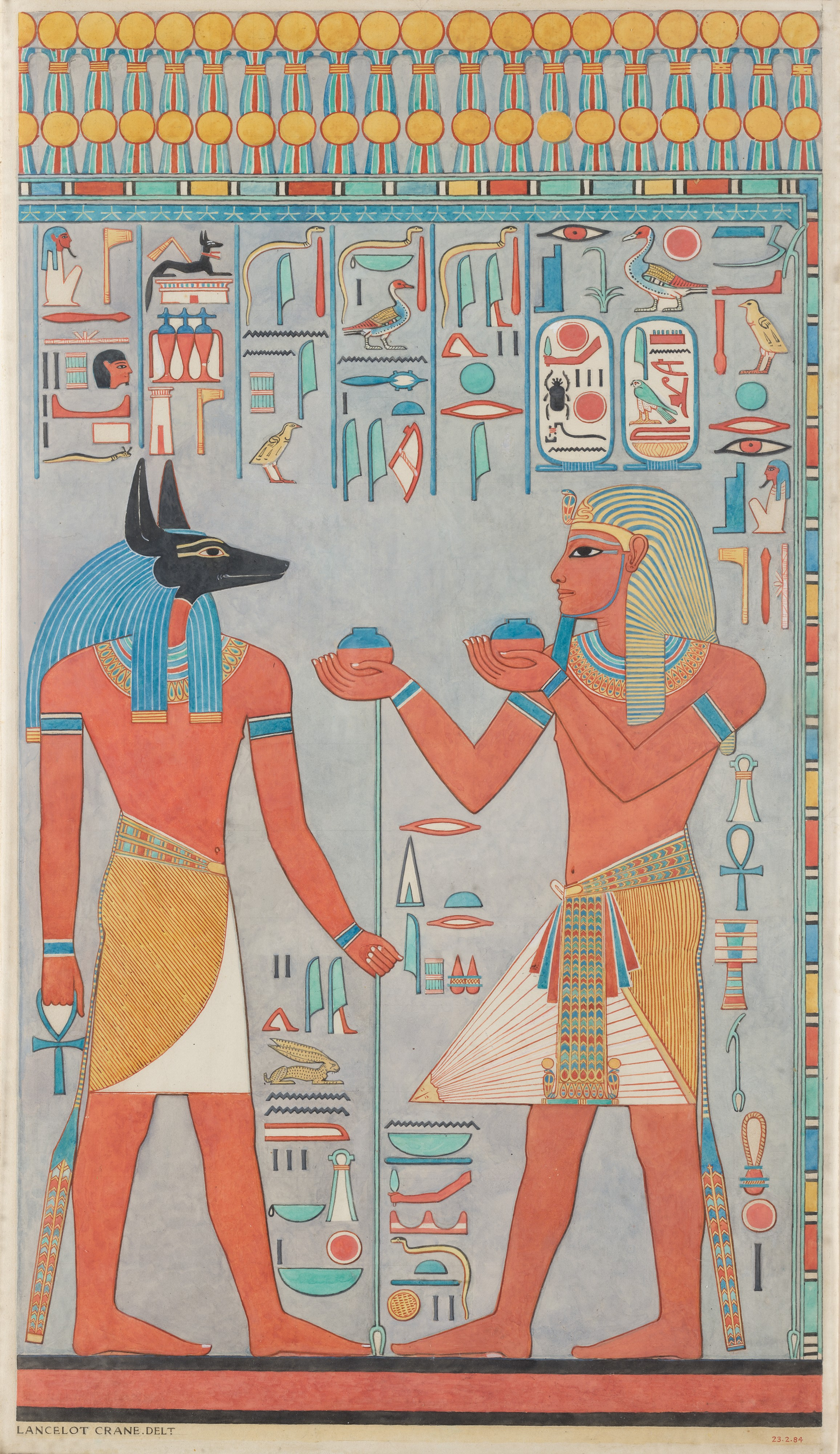
The king with Anubis, from the tomb of Horemheb; 1323-1295 BC; tempera on paper; Metropolitan Museum of Art

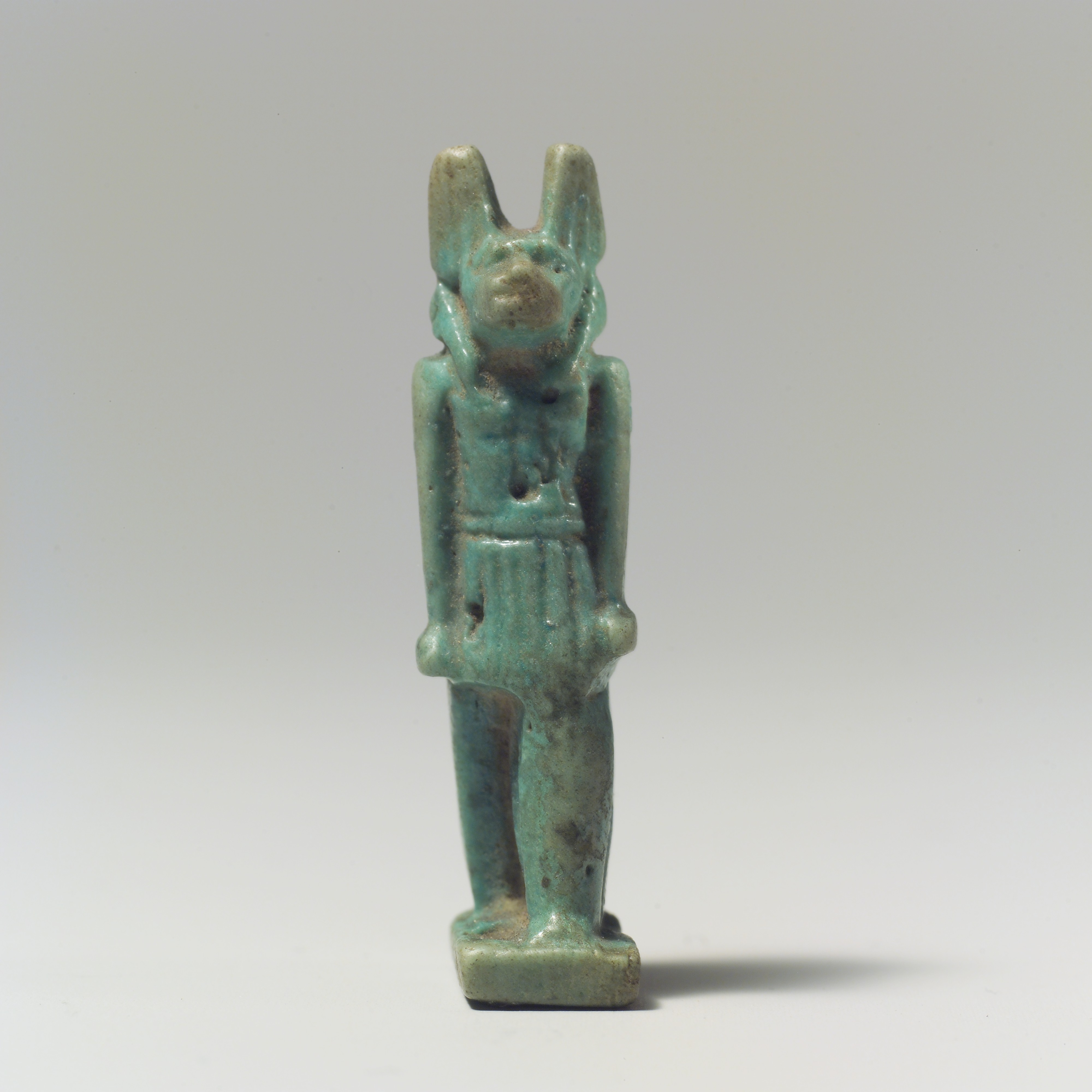
Anubis amulet; 664–30 BC; faience; height: 4.7 cm; Metropolitan Museum of Art

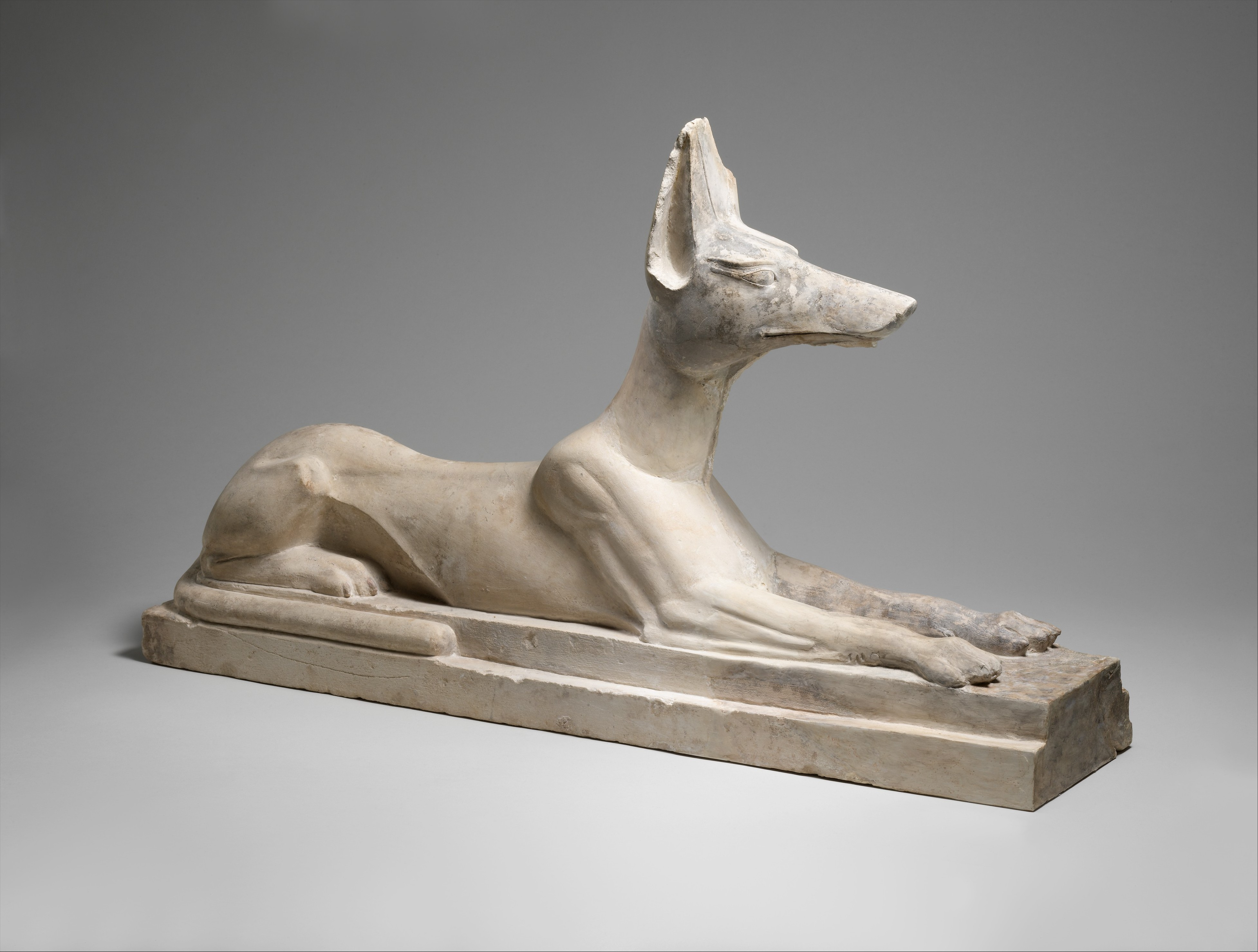
Recumbent Anubis; 664–30 BC; limestone, originally painted black; height: 38.1 cm, length: 64 cm, width: 16.5 cm; Metropolitan Museum of Art

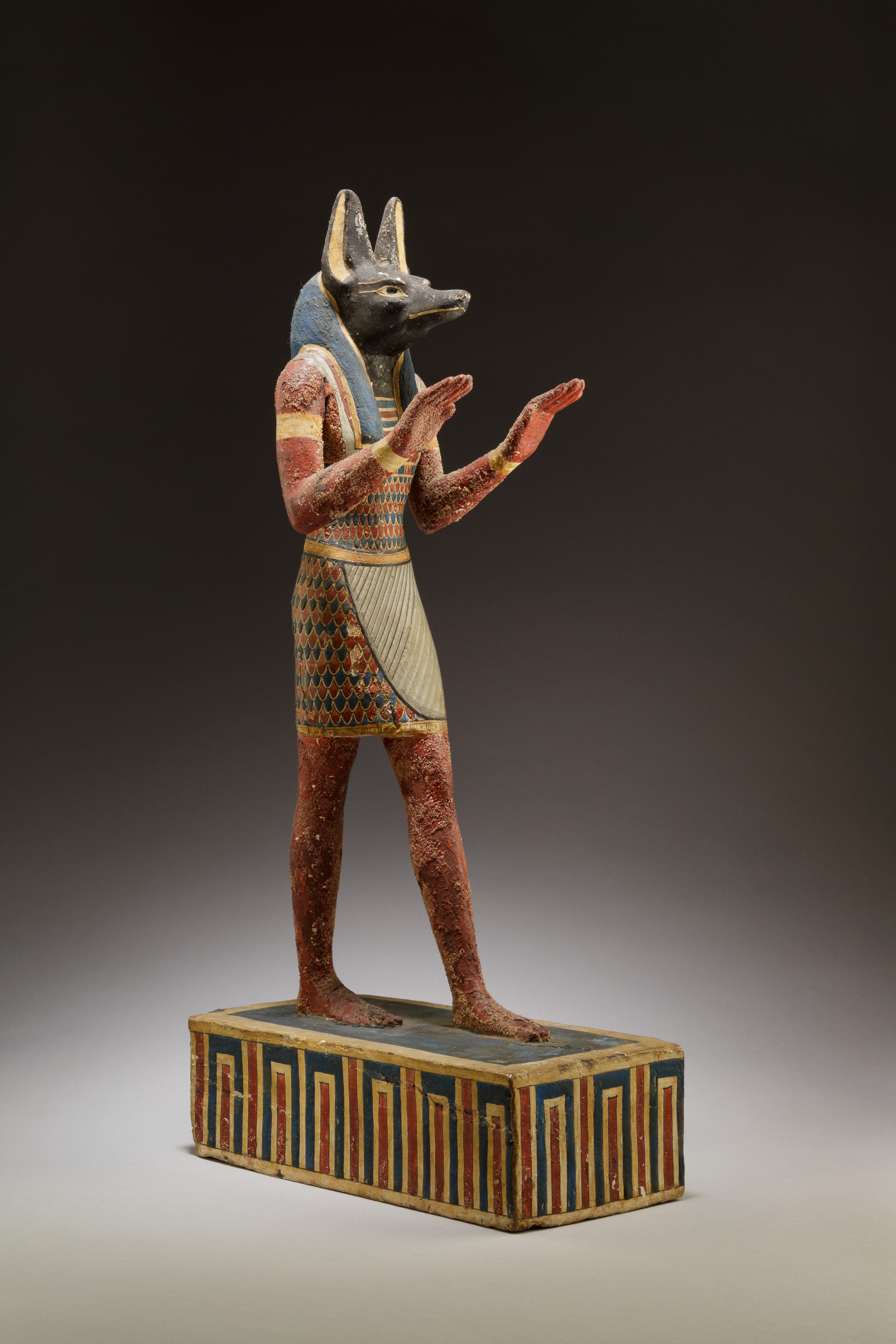
Statuette of Anubis; 332–30 BC; plastered and painted wood; 42.3 cm; Metropolitan Museum of Art

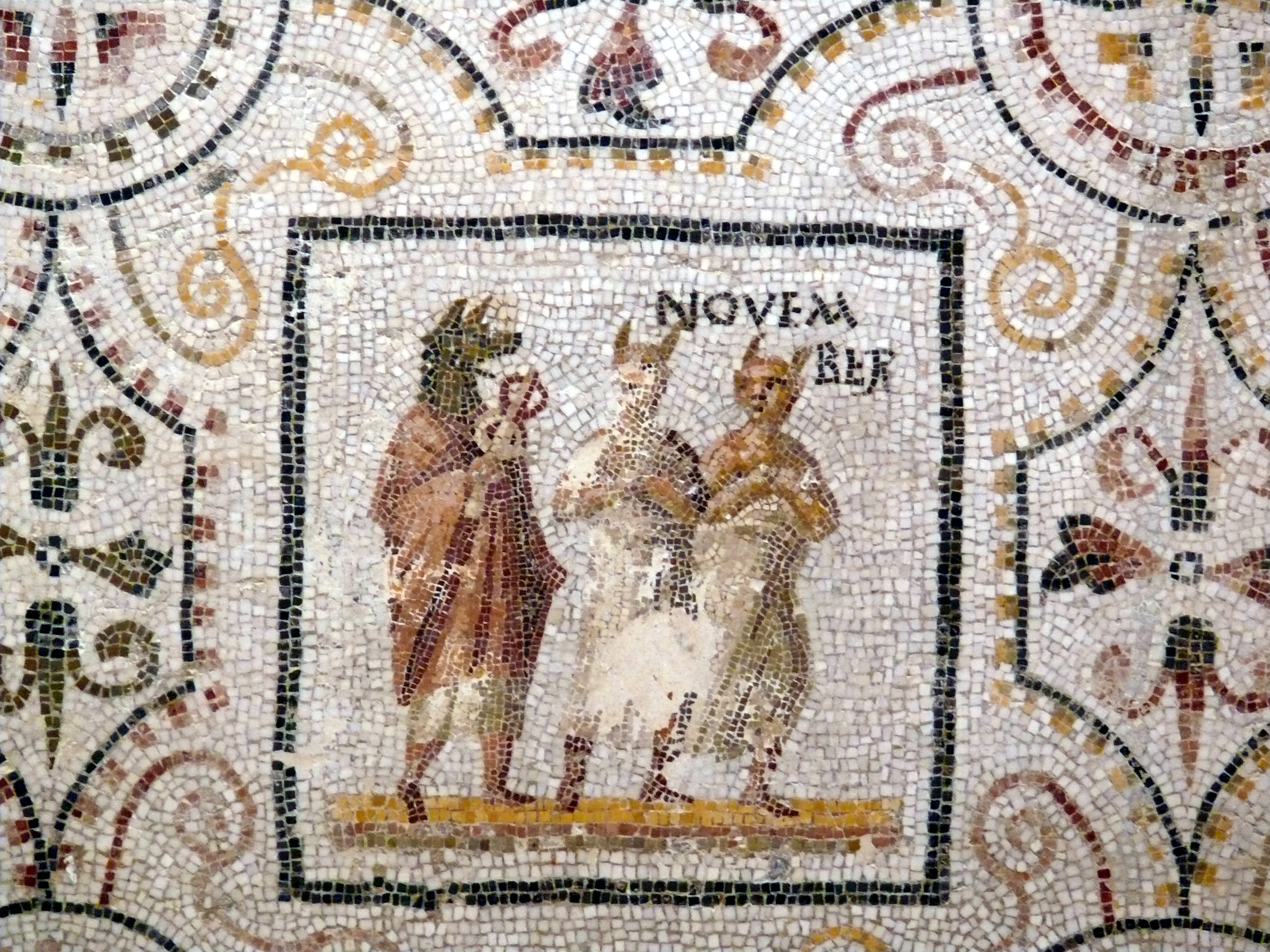
Hermanubis in the November panel of a Roman mosaic calendar from Sousse, Tunisia

== Worship ==
Although he does not appear in many myths, he was extremely popular with Egyptians and those of other cultures. The Greeks linked him to their god Hermes, the god who guided the dead to the afterlife. The pairing was later known as Hermanubis. Anubis was heavily worshipped because, despite modern beliefs, he gave the people hope. People marveled in the guarantee that their body would be respected at death, their soul would be protected and justly judged.

Anubis had male priests who sported wood masks with the god's likeness when performing rituals. His cult center was at Cynopolis in Upper Egypt but memorials were built everywhere and he was universally revered in every part of the nation.

== See also ==
- Abatur, Mandaean uthra who weighs the souls of the dead to determine their fates
- Animal mummy § Miscellaneous animals
- Anput
- Anubias
- Bhairava
- Hades
