= Šuta =

Šuta, ("Shuta"), was an Egyptian commissioner of the 1350–1335 BC Amarna letters correspondence. The name Šuta is a hypocoristicon-(nickname/petname) for the Ancient Egyptian god Set, (Seth being the "God of the Desert", and an 'anti-Horus' god-(duality, Horus/Seth)). According to one theory he is identical with the commander of the army Seti, the father of future pharaoh Ramesses I.

The following letters are referenced to commissioner Šuta, (EA for 'el Amarna'):

1. EA 234—Title: "Like Magdalu in Egypt"–Satatna of Akka/Acre, Israel letter.
2. EA 288—Title: "Benign neglect"–Abdi-Heba letter. See: Tjaru.

== The 2 letters of commissioner: Šuta ==
=== EA 288, "Benign neglect" ===
Abdi-Heba's letters, to the Egyptian pharaoh, are of moderate length, and topically discuss the intrigues of the cities, that are adjacent to Jerusalem, (a region named: Upu).

Letter EA 288: (Abdi-Heba no. 4 of 6)

Say [t]o the king-(i.e. pharaoh), my lord, [my Su]n: [M]essage of 'Abdi-Heba, your servant. I fall at the feet of the king, my lord, 7 times and 7 times. Behold, the king, my lord, has placed his name at the rising of the sun and at the setting of the sun. It is, therefore, impious what they have done to me. Behold, I am not a mayor;—I am a soldier of the king, my lord. Behold, I am a friend of the king and a tribute–bearer of the king. It was neither my father nor my mother, but the strong arm of the king that [p]laced me in the house of [my] fath[er]. [... c]ame to me ... [...]. I gave over [to his char]ge 10–slaves, Šuta, the commissioner of the king, ca[me t]o me; I gave over to Šuta's charge 21–girls, [8]0–prisoners, as a gift for the king, my lord. May the king give thought to his land; the land of the king is lost. All of it has attacked me. I am at war as far as the land of Šeru and as far as Ginti-kirmil. All the mayors are at peace, but I am at war. I am treated like an 'Apiru, and I do not visit the king, my lord, since I am at war. I am situated like a ship in the midst of the sea. The strong hand (arm) of the king took the land of Nahrima-(Mittani), and the land of Kasi-(Kush), but now the 'Apiru have taken the very cities of the king. Not a single mayor remains to the king, my lord; all are lost. Behold, Turbazu was slain in the city gate of Silu-(Tjaru). The king did nothing. Behold, servants who were joined to the 'Api[r]u smote Zimredda of Lakisu, and Yaptih-Hadda was slain in the city gate of Silu. The king did nothing. [Wh]y has he not called them to account? May the king [pro]vide for [his land] and may he [se]e to it tha[t] archers [come ou]t to h[is] land. If there are no archers this year, all the lands of the king, my lord, are lost. They have not reported to the king that the lands of the king, my lord, are lost and all the mayors lost. If there are no archers this year, may the king send a commissioner to fetch me, me along with my brothers, and then we will die near the king, our lord. [To] the scribe of the king, my lord: [Message] of 'Abdi-Heba, servant-( (your) servant). [I fall a[t (your) feet]. Present [the words-(words="discourse") that I hav]e offered to [the king, my lord]" I am your servant [and] your [s]on. -EA 288, lines 1-66 (complete, with lacuna)

=== EA 234, "Like Magdalu in Egypt" ===
Letter no. 2 of 3 by Satatna of Akka-(now Acre, Israel).

To the king, m[y] lord, the Sun from the sky: Message of Satatna, the ruler of Akka, your servant, the servant of the king, and the dirt at his feet, the ground on which he treads. [I] prostrate myself at the feet of the king, my lord, the Sun from the sky, 7 times and 7 times, both on the stomach and the back.
May the king, my lord, heed the word of his servant. [Zir]damyašda des[er]ted [B]iryawaza. He w[as] with Šuta a ... [...] of the king, in the gar[rison] city. He said [n]ot[hi]ng [t]o him. Out came the troops of the king, my lord. He w[as] with them in Magidd[a]. Nothing was said to hi[m]. Then he deserted to me, and Šuta has just written to me,—"Hand over Zirdamyašda to Biryawaza." But I have not agreed to hand him over. Akka is like Magdalu in Egypt-(named Mizri), and has the king [my lord], not [h]eard that Šuta is turned against me? May the king, my lord, [sen]d his [com]missioner to fet[ch] him. -EA 234, lines 1-35 (lost partial of sentence)

== See also ==
- Tjaru-(called Silu, on the Way of Horus)
- Abdi-Heba of Jerusalem, and Upu
