= Tahmašši =

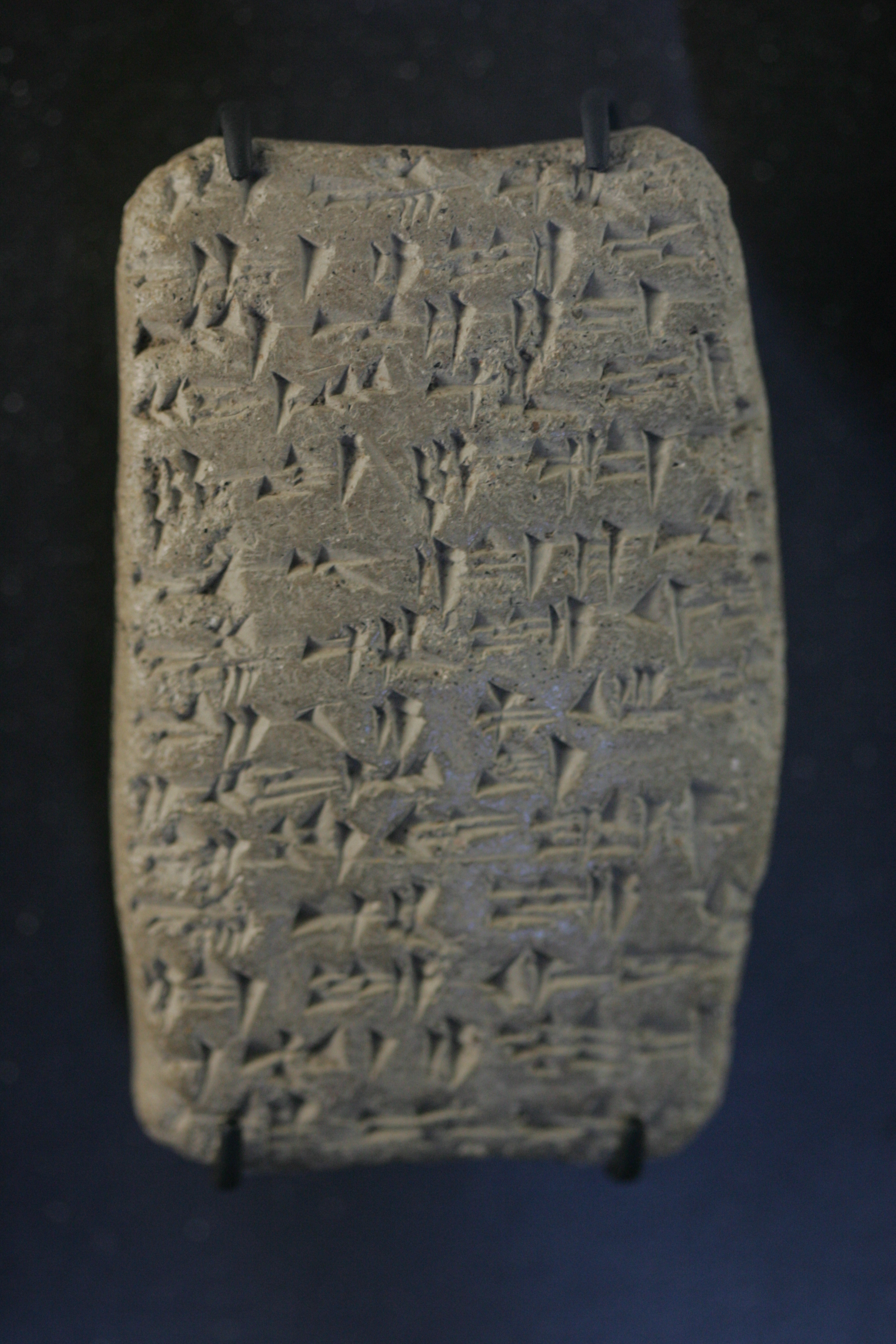
EA 364, "Justified War", city ruler Ayyab to Pharaoh, 1300s BC. Lines, obverse, 1-14, (of 28), line 13 (second from bottom) shows Takhmašši's name (characters 3-7), spelled 1.--A-tah-ma-ia. (One (cuneiform)-(diš) is the single vertical stroke for 1, or Individual, person, etc. The last character, 'ia' is unseen on right side of tablet.)

Tahmašši, or Takhmašši, and also known by his hypocoristicon or pet name: Tahmaya, or Atahmaya was an Egyptian official to pharaoh in the 1350 BC Amarna letters correspondence. His name comes from: 'Ptah-mes', meaning Ptah-Born, or "Born of Ptah".

Tahmašši's name is used in 4 Amarna letters as follows-(EA for 'el Amarna'):

1. EA 265–Tahmaya, Tahmaya
2. EA 303–Tahmašši
3. EA 316–Tahmaya
4. EA 364–Atahmaya—See Ayyab of Aštartu-(Tell-Ashtara)

== The letters ==
=== EA 265: "A gift acknowledged" ===
Letter two of three letters by Tagi of Ginti, (Gintikirmil).

"To the king, my lord: Message of Tagi, your servant. I fall at the feet of the king, my lord. My own man I sent along with [ ... ] to see the face of the king, my lord. [And] the king, my lord, [s]ent a present to me in the care of Tahmaya, and Tahmaya gave (me) a gold goblet and 1[2 se]ts of linen garments. For the information [of the kin]g, my lord. -EA 265, lines 1-15 (~complete)

=== EA 303: "Careful listening" ===
Letter three of five letters by Šubandu, a mayor in Palestine.

"To the king, my lord, my god, my Sun, the Sun from the sky: Message of Šubandu, your servant, and the dirt at your feet, the groom of your horses. I prostrate myself, on the stomach and on the back, at the feet of the king, my lord, the Sun from the sky, 7 times and 7 times. I have heard [a]ll the words of the king, my [lord], the Sun from the [s]ky, and I am indeed [g]uarding the place [of the kin]g where I am. I have listened [t]o Tahmašši [ve]ry carefully. -EA 303, lines 1-21 (complete)

=== EA 316: "Postscript to the royal scribe" ===
Letter three of three letters by Pu-Ba'lu to pharaoh, mayor of Yursa:

"[To the kin]g, m[y] lord, [my] god, my Sun fr[o]m the s[ky: Mess]age of Pu-B[a]'lu, your servant and the dirt at your feet, the [gr]oom of your horses. I fall at the feet of the king, my lord, my god, my Sun from the sky, 7 times and [7] times, on the back and on the stomach. I am indeed guarding the pla[ce of the kin]g carefully. And who is the dog that would [ne]gl[ec]t [the comma]nd of the king? I am indeed obeying the orders of [Ta]hm[ay]a, the commissioner of the king.
To the scribe of [my lord: Me]ssage of Pu-Ba'lu. I fal[l] at your feet. There was nothing in my h[ou]se when I [en]ter[ed] it, and so I have not sent a caravan to you. I am now preparing a fine caravan for you." -EA 316, lines 1-25 (complete)

== See also ==
- Amarna letters–phrases and quotations, for: "7 times and 7 times, "on the back and on the stomach"."
