= Irimayašša =

Ancient Egyptian official

Irimayašša, or Iriyamašša was an Egyptian official, of the 1350-1335 BC Amarna letters correspondence, written from a 15-20 year time period. The 2 letters that reference him are regarding Byblos/Gubla, and Ascalon, in western and southwestern Canaan.

Irimayašša is referenced in 2 letters: (EA is for 'el Amarna')

1. EA 370–Titled: "From the Pharaoh to a vassal" –to Yidya of Ašqaluna
2. EA 130–Titled: "Life among the 'Apiru"

== The 2 letters of: Official Irimayašša ==
=== EA 130, by Rib-Hadda of Gubla/Byblos ===
Title: "Life among the 'Apiru", (Sub-corpus of Rib-Hadda: no. 59 of 68).

Say [t]o the king, my lord: Message of Rib-Hadda, your servant. May the Lady of Gubla grant power to the king, my lord. I fall at the feet of the king, my lord, my Sun, 7 times and 7 times. As to the king's having written to me,

"Irimayašša is coming to you,"

...he has not come to me. As to the king's having written to me,

"Guard yourself and guard the city of the king where you are,"

...who can guard me? Look, formerly my ancestors [were str]ong. There was war against the[m, but] a garrison [of the king] was wi(t)h them. There were provisions from the king at their disposal. [Though the war against me] is seve[re], I have [n]o [provision]s [from the king or gar]ri[son of the king]. Wh[at shall I] do? As for the mayors, [the]y are the ones who strik[e] our city. They are like dogs, and there is no one who wants to serve them. What am I, who live among 'Apiru, —to do? If now there are no provisions from the king for me, my peasantry is going to fi[gh]t (against me). A[ll] lands are at war against me. If the desire of the king is to guard his city and his servant, send a garrison to guard the city. [I] will guard it while I am [a]live. When [I] die, who is going to [gu]ard it? -EA 130, lines 1-52 (complete)

(See note at talk, for the paragraphing of the two quotes.)

=== EA 370, by Pharaoh to Yidya of Ašqaluna ===
EA 370, "From the Pharaoh to a vassal" has the body of the letter damaged, and only includes the introduction to Yidya, "to guard", and also the ending formula of the Pharaoh's letters. See: letter 370, Yidya.

== See also ==
- Rib-Hadda
- Yidya, mayor of Ašqaluna
- Amarna letters
