= Tell Jemmeh =

- תל גמה (Hebrew)
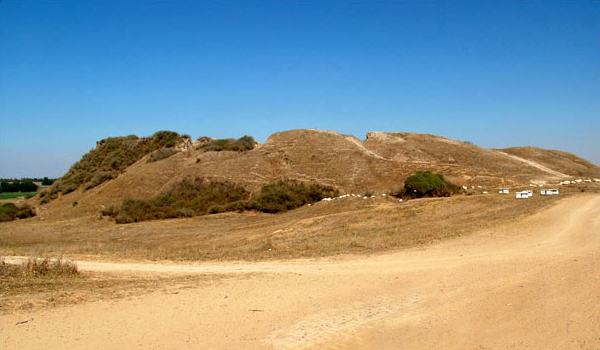
- Tell Jemmeh

- Location within Israel
- 31°23′15″N 34°26′41″E
- Type: Settlement
- Cultures: Chalcolithic, Ptolemaic, Philistines, Assyrian, Hellenistic
- Location: Southern District, Israel
- Region: Negev

History
- Built: 4th millennium BC
- Abandoned: Beginning of 2nd century BC

Site notes
- Height: 62 m (203 ft)
- Area: 5,000 m^{2} (54,000 sq ft)
- Archaeologists: Flinders Petrie
- Condition: In ruins

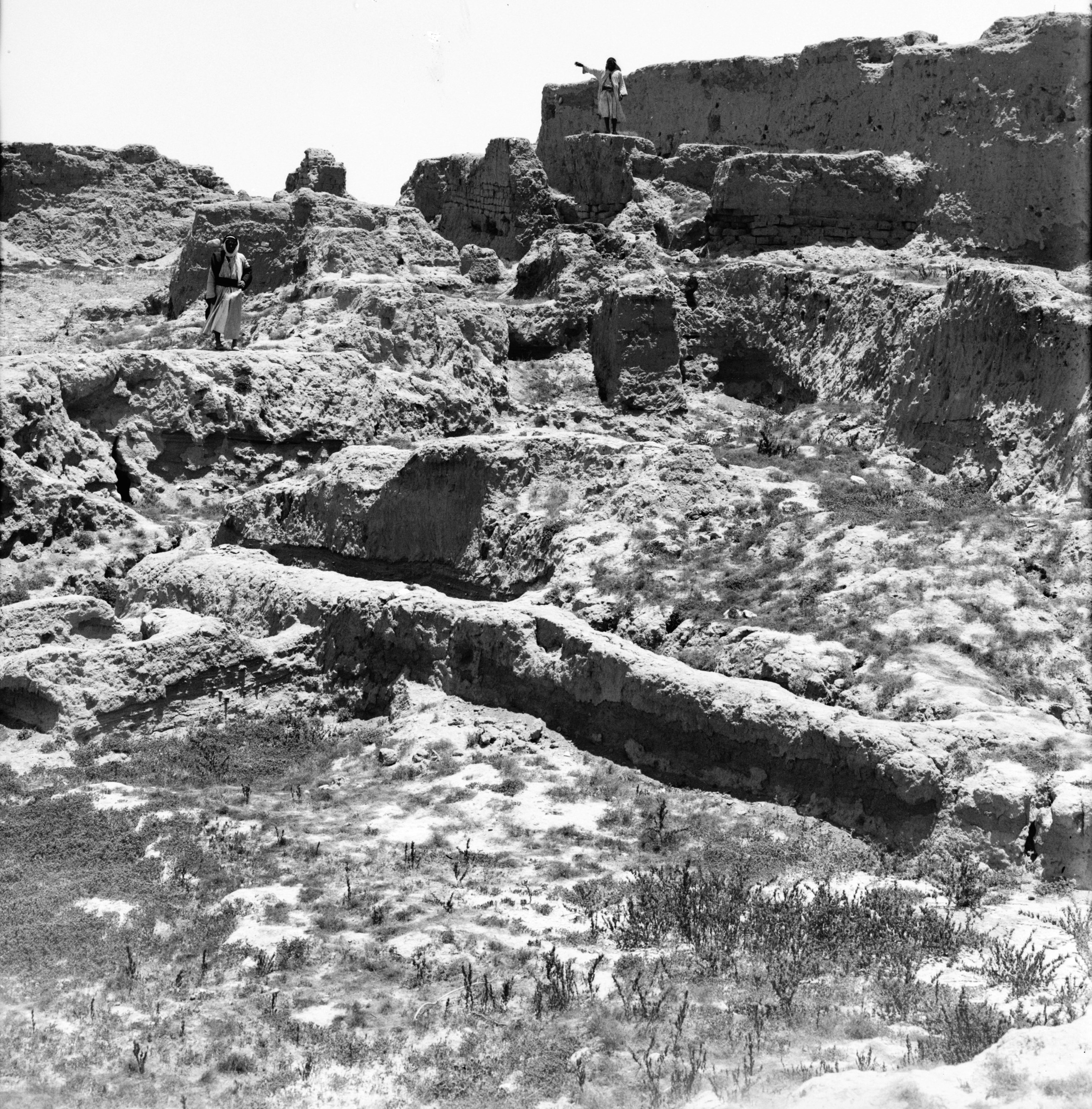
Excavations on the southern side of Tell Jemmeh by Flinders Petrie

Tell Jemmeh or Tell Gemmeh (Arabic: تل جمه), also known in Hebrew as Tel Gamma (תל גמה) or Tel Re'im (תל רעים), is a prominent mound, or tell, located in the region of the northwestern Negev and the southern coastal plain of Israel, about 12 km south of Gaza, bounded by the kibbutz of Re'im 2 km to the east, and the kibbutz of Kisufim 6 km to the west, and is 9 km east of the Mediterranean coast. The site is located at the confluence of two seasonal streams, Wadi Gaza and Nahal Gerar. Both have changed their course in this area many times throughout history.

Tell Jemmeh is one of three major sites along the Besor Stream along with Tell el-Far'ah and Tell el-Ajjul. Some archaeologists identify the Besor Stream with the "Brook of Egypt" found in the Hebrew Bible (Torah). There are also a number of ancient sites to the east along the Gerar Stream.

Tell Jemmeh is famous for two significant archaeological discoveries: an Assyrian structure, probably a palace, from the Assyrian occupation of the northern Kingdom of Israel, and a grain storage facility from the time of the Ptolemaic Kingdom.

The mound is 23 metres high and dominates its surrounding plains, which are excellent for agriculture. It spans an area of 12 acres or 43 dunams. Tell Jemmeh is located about 10 kilometres from Tell el-Farah (South) and Tell el-Ajjul, which allows for them to communicate by signal fires. This orientation of the sites suggests it was a border zone. The ancient inhabitants of Tell Jemmeh probably depended on spring water from the nearby Besor Stream. Most of the building material used in the site is sun-dried mudbrick.

Tell Jemmeh was first settled as a hunter-farmer village during the Chalcolithic period, six thousand years ago. It was inhabited for 200 years and then abandoned until it was rebuilt in the Middle Bronze Age. From here the site would be settled for 1,600 years. It is identified with Yursa, mentioned in the Egyptian Amarna Letters from 1350–1330 BCE.

== Geography ==
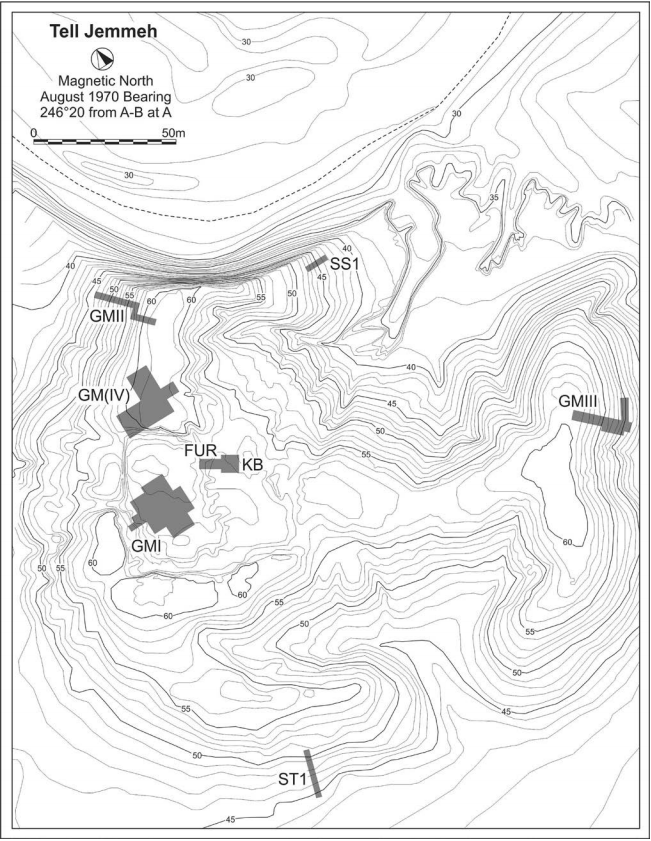
Tell Jemmeh, topographic map with excavation areas

The site of Tell Jemmeh is a mound located on the southern bank of the Besor River. The natural hill is about 45 meters high, with the accumulation of layers representing human activity, spanning from the Chalcolithic through the Persian periods, adding about 18 meters to the height of the hill. The tell suffers from continuous erosion due to the flooding of the Besor River located on the north side of the mound. This phenomenon is intensified because of the fragile character of the local loess soil.

== Excavation and identification ==
=== Gerar ===
Tell Jemmeh was excavated for the first time by W. J. Phythian-Adams of the Palestine Exploration Fund in 1922. His expedition lasted only one day because of security problems. He identified the site with biblical Gerar (mentioned in the Book of Genesis), as he found remains of human occupation by the Middle Bronze Age, the supposed time of biblical Abraham and Isaac. A nearby Byzantine site called Umm Gerar, some 3.6 kilometres south on the Besor river, further convinced him that Tell Jemmeh is biblical Gerar. Flinders Petrie excavated the site in 1927 for five months and accepted the identification with Gerar.

=== Yursa/Arsa/Yarda/Orda ===
In 1952, Benjamin Mazar from the Hebrew University of Jerusalem challenged this identification. He believed Tell Jemmeh should be identified with Yursa, a city mentioned in the Amarna Letters; Yarda, mentioned by Jewish-Roman scholar Josephus; and Orda, in documents from the Byzantine period. Today, most scholars accept this identification. The association of Tell Jemmeha with Yursa is based on the site's prominence and strategic positing, controlling the coastal route on the southernmost edge of the Canaanite territory. This identification is further substantiated by the petrographic provenancing of two Amarna letters written from Yursa's governor Pu-Ba'lu to the king of Egypt.

The next excavation of the site was spread across nine seasons from 1970 to 1978 and was conducted by a team of archaeologists from the Smithsonian Institution, Washington, D.C., United States. They returned to the site four more times between 1982 and 1990. The expedition, headed by Gus W. Van Beek, found evidence to support Mazar's identification, and also identified the site with Arsa from Neo-Assyrian inscriptions. Circular structures initially discovered by Petrie were deemed "beehive granaries" which was later, at first, confirmed in the Van Beck excavation. Further work by that team showed that they were actually conventional granaries. Four seventh century BC ostraca were found.

== Archaeology and history ==
=== Chalcolithic period ===
The first human settlement to be found in Tell Jemmeh is from the fourth millennium BCE during the Chalcolithic period. The people were hunters and farmers and it was one of the small settlements which existed along the Besor Stream. This settlement lasted for only 200 years. From then the site was abandoned for more than a thousand years as the region became a hub for nomadism.

=== Middle Bronze Age ===
==== Middle Bronze II ====
A settlement appeared during the Middle Bronze Age II period, around 1800 BCE. The site saw continuous human settlement for the next 1600 years.

=== Late Bronze Age ===
==== Late Bronze II ====
During the Late Bronze Age II, subsequent with the golden age of the New Kingdom of Egypt (ca. 1450–1200 BCE), the region of Canaan, to which Tell Jemmeh belongs, was under the control of the Egyptian Empire and the city at Tell Jemmeh saw its height as well.

During this particular period, Tell Jemmeh was known as Yursa and was mentioned in some Egyptian sources. First, it was mentioned in the list of 119 cities conquered by Pharaoh Thutmose III in his campaign to thwart a Canaanite rebellion against Egypt (1468 BCE). Yursa is mentioned with Sharuhen as the southwestern border of Canaan. One of the passages in the story of Thutmose's conquests states that Sharuhen remained loyal to the Pharaoh and served as a garrison town, while Yursa turned on Egypt.

According to the Egyptian source, Yursa was captured and thus included in the list of cities taken by Thutmose.

Also, it is later mentioned in two of the Amarna Letters (1350 BCE - 1330 BCE). Its king was called Pu-Ba'lu and his kingdom was important to the Egyptians as it was on the main route connecting Egypt with the rest of the Fertile Crescent, dubbed in modern times as the Via Maris.

The most prominent archaeological feature of this period is a huge structure (19x16 meters) which served as either a palace or a large house with a big courthouse. This settlement was the first to be fortified. Remains of the wall and a gateway are found in the northeast side of the mound. A large quantity of imported ware was found, including ware of Mycenaean and Cypriot origin.

=== Iron Age ===
Tell Jemmeh was conquered by the Philistines at around 1175 BCE, along with what were to become the five major Philistine cities: Gaza, Ashkelon, Ashdod, Gath and Ekron. Tell Jemmeh appears to have been a daughter-town of Gaza, under its control. The only Philistine ceramic kiln in Israel was found in Tell Jemmeh. It was an enormous, technologically advanced installation, the most prominent structure discovered from the Philistine period.

Only a small part of the settlement of the 10th to 8th centuries BCE was excavated. The main part of these settlements was located mostly on the western side of the site. At least two fortification systems of that period were discovered. The better-preserved wall was constructed in the 8th century BCE and is a casemate wall (double city wall, with transversal walls creating separate chambers).

=== Assyrian period ===
During the 7th century BCE, the Neo-Assyrian Empire expanded, and Israel and Philistia were conquered under Tiglath-Pileser III, Sargon II, and Sennacherib. Esarhaddon, the son of Sennacherib, is mentioned in some texts as having taken a city called Arsa near the River of Egypt, and its king Asuhili was taken back to the Assyrian capital Ninveh in the year 679 BCE.

Esarhaddon probably built a military camp at Tell Jemmeh to defend the new frontier of his empire and to use as a base camp in his later campaigns against the Egyptians in 674, 671, and 669 BCE.

A large structure, with a mudbrick self-supporting arch roof, was discovered and dated specifically to a period between 679 and 630 BCE. It is believed to have been the seat of a military governor or general. As preserved, the structure measures 12.5 m long and 10 m wide. The original length of the structure is unknown because of previous archaeological work of Petrie and due to erosion. The structure has at least six rooms, three large and long and three short and small. Its plan corresponds with common Assyrian buildings (categorized as "Reception Suite Type F").

The Assyrians built a new casemate wall on top of the destroyed eighth-century wall. The large Assyrian structure was still in use after Esarhaddon died in 660 BCE, as it was during the reign of Ashurbanipal. It was likely abandoned rather than destroyed as the Assyrians withdrew from the region.

=== Hellenistic period ===
At the beginning of the Hellenistic period, the Ptolemaic Kingdom ruled the region. Tell Jemmeh transformed into a significant grain storage center, and the residents moved to settle in the areas around the hill. The site was finally deserted at the beginning of the 2nd century BC.

=== Tell replaced by lower city ===
Later periods are not represented on the tell, indicating that the location of the settlement (especially during the Byzantine and Mamluk period) likely shifted to the lower city south of the tell.

=== Ottoman period ===
During the Ottoman period, the site was inhabited by the Bedouin tribe of 'Arab al-Jubarat (عرب الجبارات).

== See also ==
- Archaeology in Israel
- Eshkol National Park
- History of ancient Israel

== Bibliography ==
- David Ben-Shlomo and Gus w. van Beek (2014), The Smithsonian Institution Excavation at Tell Jemmeh, Israel, 1970–1990, Smithsonian Institution Scholarly Press
- Rahmani, L.Y. (1971), "Silver Coins of the Fourth Century from Tell Gamma" Israel Exploration Journal 21, pp. 158–160, 1971
- Wapnish, Paula (1988), and Brian Hesse, "Urbanization and the Organization of Animal Production at Tell Jemmeh in the Middle Bronze Age Levant", Journal of Near Eastern Studies, vol. 47, no. 2, pp. 81–94, 1988 doi:10.1086/373259
