= Reanap =

Egyptian commissioner

Reanap, also Reanapa (cuneiform: 𒊑𒀀𒈾𒉺 ri-a-na-pa) was an ancient Egyptian commissioner, of the 1350–1335 BC Amarna letters, written from a 15–20 year time period. Of the 382 El-Amarna letters correspondence, Reanapa is referenced in three:

- EA 292–Titled: Like a pot held in pledge, see Adda-danu.
- EA 315–Titled: "Like a command of the Sun"
- EA 326–Titled: "A new commissioner"

== Two short letters ==
The topic of two short letters, EA 315, and 326 is Reanapa, and no intrigues of other cities/city-states, or individuals, are involved. The prostration formula to the pharaoh, and subservience to the king's authority can be seen.

=== EA 315, by Pu-Ba'lu of Yursa ===
Letter no. 2 of 3 by Pu-Ba'lu:

[To the kin]g, my lord, my god, the Sun from the sky: Message of Pu-Ba'lu, the ruler of Yursa, the dirt at your feet. I indeed prostrate myself at the feet of the king, my lord, 7 times and 7 times, on the back and on the sto[ma]ch.
I am indeed guard[ing] the city of the king, [my] lo[rd], and the place of the king, my lord, the Sun fr[om the sk]y. Whatever the king, my lord, has commanded—I am indeed observing, day and night, the order of the king, my lord.
As to [R]eanapa, the commissioner [of the kin]g, (my) lord, what the king, my lord, commanded ( i.e. through him), [is mig]hty like the command of the Sun in the sky. [Wh]o is the dog that would not [ob]serve the orders of the king, my lord, [the Sun] f[ro]m the sky?

=== EA 326, by Yidya of Ašqaluna ===
Letter no. 7 of 7 by Yidya:

To the king, my lord, my god, [my] Sun, the Sun from the sky: Message of Yidya, your servant, the dirt at your feet, the groom of your horses. I indeed prostrate myself, on the [back] and on the stomach, at the feet of the king, my lord, 7 times and 7 times.
I am indeed guarding the city of the king, my lord. May the gods of the king, my lord, [guard] his cities, and may the [power]ful hands of the king guard his entire land.
I have heard the word of the king, my lord, to his commissioner. Since he was unable to guard the land of the king, my lord, the king, my lord, has now appointed Reanapa as [com]missioner of the king, my lord. He brings to m[e] whatever seems good to the king, my lord.
[Wha]tever procee[ds] from the mouth of the king, my lord, I indeed observe it day and nig(ht). —EA 326, lines 1-24 (complete)

== See also ==
- Adda-danu
- Amarna letters–phrases and quotations, for: A Pot held in Pledge
- Pu-Ba'lu, mayor of Yursa
- Yidya, mayor of Ašqaluna
