= Migdol =

Hebrew word

G17 D36 V31 U33 M17 Z4 D21 Z1 O36 O1
mktr
in hieroglyphs
Era: Middle Kingdom
(2055–1650 BC)

Aa15 D36 W11 G1 D46 Z4 D21 Z1 O49
mꜥgꜣdjr
in hieroglyphs

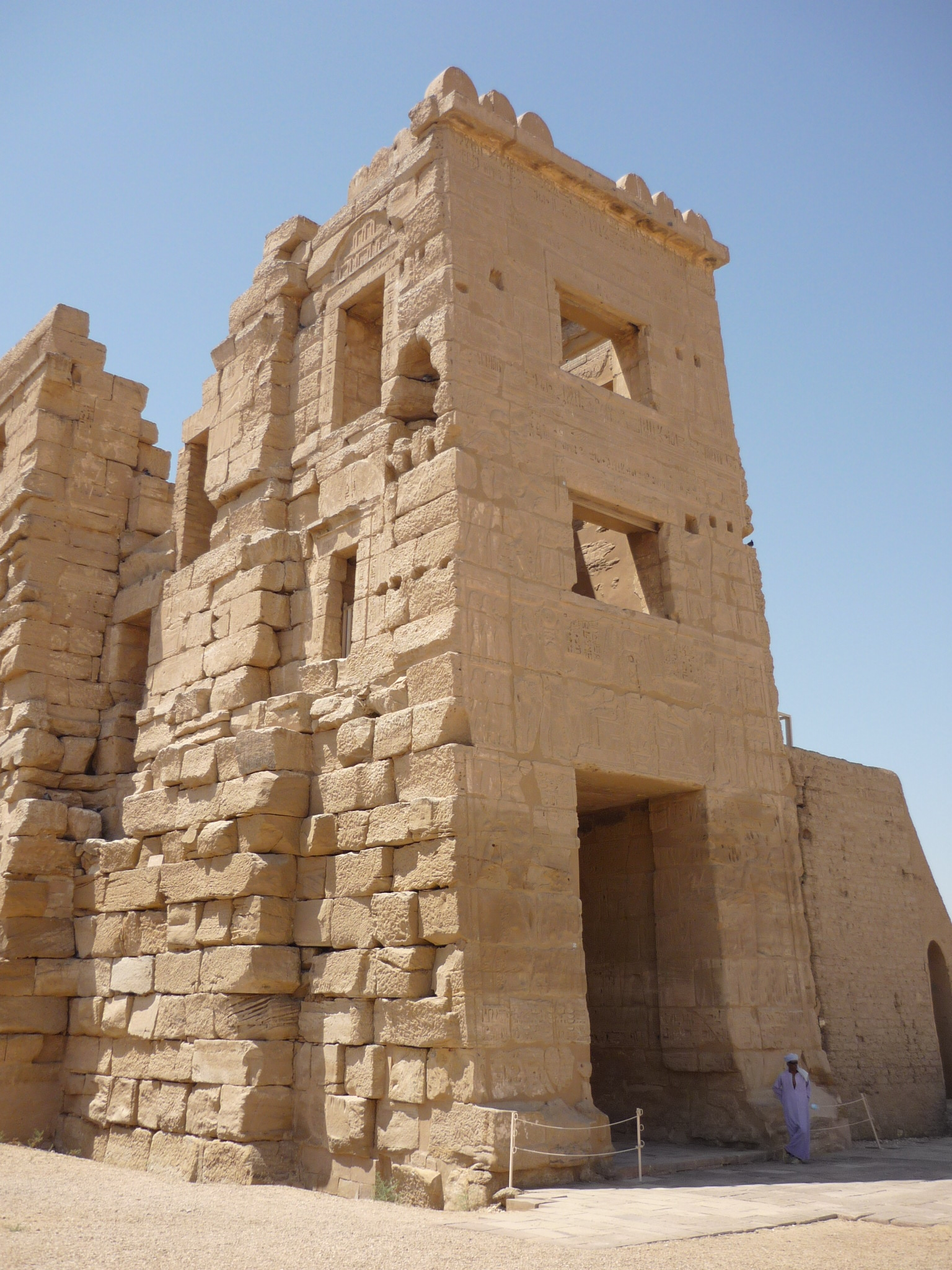
Migdol of Medinet Habu, Theban Necropolis, Egypt

Migdol, or migdal, is a Hebrew word (מגדּלה מגדּל, מגדּל מגדּול) which means either a tower (from its size or height), an elevated stage (a rostrum or pulpit), or a raised bed (within a river). Physically, it can mean fortified land, i.e. a walled city or castle; or elevated land, as in a raised bed, like a platform, possibly a lookout.

"Migdol" has been suggested as a loanword from Egyptian (mktr), mekter, or mgatir meaning "fort," "fortification," or "stronghold," and the corresponding term in Coptic is ⲙⲉϣⲧⲱⲗ meštôl. (Figuratively, "tower" has connotations of proud authority.) However, the word clearly entered Egyptian from the original Northwest Semitic term magdalu, which itself originated with the Akkadian verb dagalu, meaning "to look or watch." The association of the toponym with watchtowers is confirmed by the relationship of sites bearing Arabic place names related to Ar. majdal or majdaluna, which were strategically located along routes between Bronze Age centers.

Although archaeologically, migdol has been traditionally identified with a specific type of temple, examples of which have been discovered, for instance, at Hazor, Megiddo, Tel Haror, Pella and Shechem, no temples are identified as migdols in ancient sources, outside of associations made by biblical scholars with a single passage in Judges 9 referencing a Migdol-Shechem. This identification can be regarded as questionable, and particularly so in light of the evidence offered by more than sixty toponyms in the Levant, which are associated with important vista points above major routes.

== Ancient places named Migdol or Migdal ==
In the Hebrew Bible, the Book of Exodus records that the children of Israel encamped at Pi-Hahiroth between Migdol and the Red Sea, before their crossing.

In Amarna letters (1350–1335 BC), specifically in letter EA 234, "Magdalu in Egypt" is mentioned in the context of a dispute between the local ruler and an Egyptian commissioner named Šuta. Albright identified this place name with 'Migdol' mentioned in the Hebrew Bible.

In archaeology, the earliest mention of Migdol fortress (“Migdol of Men-maʿat-re) was on a wall of Karnak Temple in the reign of king Seti I. It was part of his list of geographical locations in the eastern Nile Delta.

It also appears in the ancient Papyrus Anastasi: Papyrus Anastasis V (20:2-3) implies that Migdol was built by Pharaoh Seti I of the 19th dynasty, the same king who first established the city of Piramesses. According to a map of the Way of Horus, Migdol is east of the Dwelling of the Lion, which has been located at Tell el-Borg, near the north coast of the Sinai Peninsula and the estuary of the Ballah Lakes. Since the early 2000s, archaeologists identified its exact location with the nearby site of T-211 to the east of the ancient Pelusiac branch of the Nile Delta, in the area just to the east of the modern Suez canal.

The Book of Joshua referred to Migdal-Gad, 'tower of Gad', one of the fortified cities of Judah, and also to Migdal-El, 'tower of God', one of the fortified towns of Naphtali (Joshua 19:38).

Jeremiah referred to Migdol (Jeremiah 44:1) in its near-geographical relation to Tahpanhes and Memphis, three Egyptian cities where the Jewish people settled after the Siege of Jerusalem (587 BC). At this time, the city's name had moved its location to Tell Qedua.

Ezekiel referred to Migdol in describing the length of the land of Egypt "from Migdol to Syene (Aswan)". (Ezekiel 29:10, Ezekiel 30:6).

== Places in modern Israel named Migdal ==
Migdal is a town in the northern district of Israel, 8 km north of Tiberias.

Migdal Ha'emek is a city in modern-day Israel, situated on a large hill surrounded by the Kishon river, west of Nazareth.
