= Yidya =

Biridiya

King of Asqaluna
- Reign: c. 1340 BC

Yidya, and also Idiya (fl. c. 1340 BC) was the Canaanite king of Asqaluna in the 1350-1335 BC Amarna letters correspondence.

Yidya is mainly referenced in the Amarna letters corpus, in his own letters: EA 320–326, (EA for 'el Amarna'). However, the other reference to Yidya is a letter from the pharaoh to his vassal Yidya, letter EA 370.

The titles of Yidya's letters are as follows:

EA 320—title: "Listening carefully (1)"
EA 321—title: "Listening carefully (2)"
EA 322—title: "Listening carefully (3)"
EA 323—title: "A royal order for glass"
EA 324—title: "Preparations completed (1)"
EA 325—title: "Preparations Completed (2)"
EA 326—title: "A new commissioner"

== The letters of Yidya ==
=== EA 370, title: "From the Pharaoh to a vassal" ===
"Say to Idiya, the ruler of Ašqaluna: Thus the king. He herewith dispatches to you this tablet-(i.e. tablet-letter), saying to you, Be on your guard. You are to guard the place of the king where you are.
The king herewith sends to you Irimayašša ...
...
And know that the king is hale like the Sun in the sky. For his troops and his chariots in multitude, from the Upper Land to the Lower Land, the rising of the sun to the setting of the sun, all goes very well." -EA 370, lines 1-29 (lacuna of lines 9-22)

See: Amarna letters–phrases and quotations, for the phrasing: "the king is Hale like the Sun"..., for long form (like this), and short form.

=== EA 323, title: "A royal order for glass" ===
"To the king, my lord, my god, my Sun, the Sun from the sky: Message of Yidya, your servant, the dirt at your feet, the groom of your horses. I indeed prostrate myself, on the back and on the stomach, at the feet of the king, my lord, 7 times and 7 times. I am indeed guarding the [pl]ace of the king, my lord, and the city of the king, in accordance with the command of the king, my lord, the Sun from the sky. As to the king, my lord's, having ordered some glass, I [her]ewith send to the k[ing], my [l]ord, 30–("pieces") of glass. Moreover, who is the dog that would not obey the orders of the king, my lord, the Sun fr[o]m the sky, the son of the Sun, [wh]om the Sun loves?" -EA 323, lines 1-23 (complete)

=== EA 326, title: "A new commissioner" ===
An article about the new commissioner, Reanapa. See: Reanap

=== EA 321, title: "Listening carefully (2)" ===
"To the king, my lord, my god, my Sun, the Sun from the sky: [Mes]sage of Yidya, the ruler of Ašqaluna, your servant, the dirt at your feet, the [gr]oom of your hors[e]s. I indeed prostrate myself, on the stomach and on the back, at the feet of the king, my lord, the Sun from the sky, 7 times and 7 times. As to the commissioner of the king, my lord, whom the king my lord, the Sun from the sky, sent to me, I have listened to his orders [ver]y carefully.
[And] I am indeed guarding the [pla]ce of the king whe[re] I am." -EA 321, lines 1-26 (complete; note 2 paragraphs)

=== EA 325, title: "Preparations completed (2)" ===
"[To] the king, my lord, my god, my Sun, the Sun fr[om the s]ky: Message of Yidya, your servant, the dirt at your feet, the groom of [yo]ur horses. I indeed prostrate myself, on the back and on the stomach, at the feet of the king, my lord, 7 times and 7 times.
I am indeed guarding the place of the king, my lord, and the city of the king, my lord, [w]here I am. Who is the dog that would not obey the orders of the king, the Sun from the sky?
I have indeed prepared absolutely everything—[f]ood, strong drink, oxen, sheep, and goats, straw, absolutely everything that the king, my lord, commanded. I have indeed prepared it.
And I am indeed p[reparing] the tribute of the Sun, in accordance with the comma[nd] of the king, my lord, the Sun fr[om the sky]." -EA 325, lines 1-22 (complete)

== See also ==
- Ashkelon
- Reanap, Egyptian commissioner
- Irimayašša, Egyptian official
