= Amarna letter EA 323 =

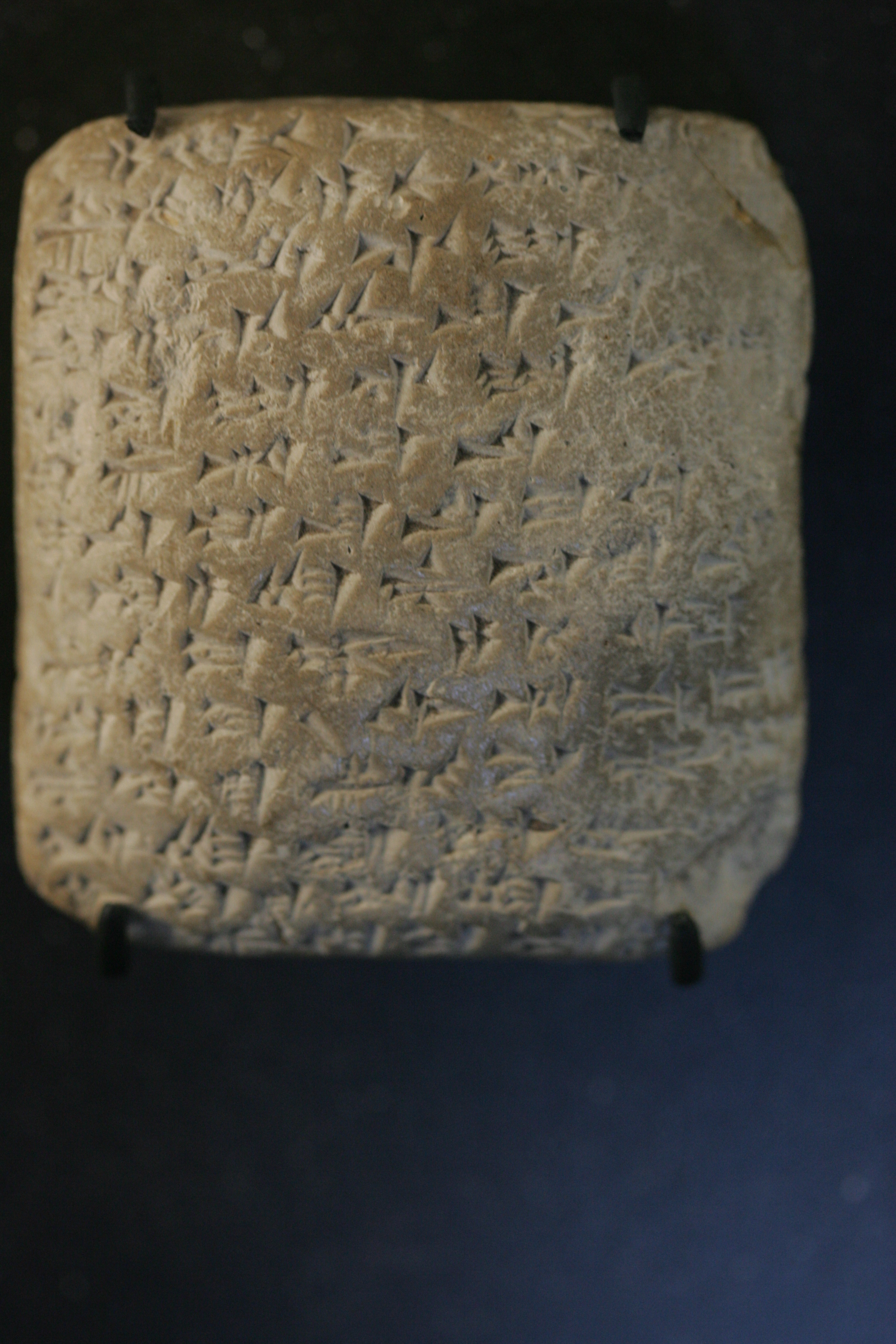
EA 365, similar-size, and a rectangular letter, similar to Yidya's letter EA 323 (very high-resolution expandable photo)

Amarna letter EA 323, titled: A Royal Order for Glass, is a smaller, square, mostly flat clay tablet letter written on both sides, but only half of the reverse; it is also written on the bottom, and is a letter from 'governor' Yidya, and is a short letter like many of his other Amarna letters, numbered EA 320 to EA 326.

EA 323 is so short that it can be described as: a prostration formula to the Pharaoh (the letter is written to the King/Pharaoh), a statement of him guarding his city-state of Ascalon-(Ašqaluna of the letters), and the subject of delivering glass to the King of Egypt.

The clay tablet letter is located at the British Museum, no. BM 29836. (Obverse, see here:)

The Amarna letters, about 300, numbered up to EA 382, are a mid 14th century BC, about 1350 BC and 20–25 years later, correspondence. The initial corpus of letters were found at Akhenaten's city Akhetaten, in the floor of the Bureau of Correspondence of Pharaoh; others were later found, adding to the body of letters.

== The letter ==
=== EA 323: "A Royal Order for Glass" ===
EA 323, letter four of seven. (Not a linear, line-by-line translation, and English from French.)

Obverse:

(Lines 1-5)--To the king, my lord, my god, my Sun, the Sun from the sky: Message of Yidya, your servant, the dirt at your feet, the groom of your horses.
(6-13)--I indeed prostrate myself, on the back and on the stomach, at the feet of the king, my lord, 7 times and 7 times. I am indeed guarding the [pl]ace of the king, my lord and the city of the king(Ashkelon), in accordance with the command of the king, my lord, the Sun from the sky.
(13-16)--As to the king, my lord's having ordered some glass, I [her]ewith send to the k[ing], my [l]ord, 30 (pieces) of glass.

Bottom & Reverse:

(17-23)--Moreover, who is the dog that would not obey the orders of the king, my lord, the Sun fr[o]m the sky, the son of the Sun, [wh]om the Sun loves?--(complete, Obverse & Reverse, lines 1-23)

== Akkadian text ==
The Akkadian language text:

Obverse:

(Line 1)--A-na 1.-^{diš}LUGAL EN-ia,.. DINGIR.MEŠ.ia,..--(To King-Lord-mine,.. (of) God(s)(pl)-mine,.. )
(2)--^{d}"UTU"-ia,.. ^{d}UTU ša iš-tu--(^{God}-"SUN-god"-mine,.. ^{God}-SUN-god,.. which from,.. )
(3)--An-ša_{10}-me umma 1.-^{diš}Yi-iD-iYa,.. ("God-Heaven(God-Šamû)",.. "Message" 1.-Yidya,.. )
(4)--ARAD-ka,.. "ip-ri",.. "ša" 2.-^{diš}GÌR.MEŠ.ka,.. (Servant-yours,.. "Dust",.. "which at" 2.-Feet(pl)-yours,.. )
(5)--LÚ qar-tab-bi,.. ša ANŠE.KUR.RA.MEŠ-ka,..--(..(the) Groom,.. "which of" Horses-yours,.. )
(6)--ana 2.-^{diš}GÌR.MEŠ,.. LUGAL-EN-ia,.. lu-ú,..(..at 2.-feet(pl),.. King-Lord-mine,.. "May it be",.. )
(7)--"iš-ta-ha-hi-in",.. 7.-^{diš} it-šu,..(.."I prostrate myself",.. 7 times,.. )

(Line 1)--(Ana 1.LUGAL ^{EN}Bēlu-ia,.. (of) DINGIR.MEŠ(pl))-ia,.. )
(2)--(^{D}-"UTU"-ia,.. ^{D}-UTU,.. ša ištu,.. )
(3)--("DINGIR-Šamû",.. "Umma" 1.-Yidya,.. )
(4)--(ARAD-ka,.. "eperu",.. "ša" 2.-šēpu.meš-ka,.. )
(5)--(..kartappu/(qartabbu),.. ša sīsû(ANŠE.KUR.RA.MEŠ(pl),.. )
(6)--(..ana 2.-šēpu.meš(pl),.. LUGAL ^{EN}Bēlu-ia,.. "lú",.. )
(7)--(.."iš-ta-ha-hi-in",.. 7. it-šu,.. )

== See also ==
- Yidya
- Ashkelon
- Amarna letter EA 325
- Amarna letters–phrases and quotations
