= Amarna letter EA 254 =

Amarna letter EA 254, titled: "Neither Rebel nor Delinquent (2)", is a moderate length, tall, and mostly flat rectangular clay tablet Amarna letter, (see here ). The letter is from Labaya of city-state Šakmu (Shechem today). It is an undamaged letter, in pristine condition, with cuneiform script on almost all surfaces: Obverse, Bottom, Reverse, and Left Side. Letter EA 254 is numbered VAT 335, from the Vorderasiatisches Museum Berlin.

The Amarna letters, about 300, numbered up to EA 382, are a mid 14th century BC, about 1360 BC and 30-35 years later, correspondence. The initial corpus of letters were found at Akhenaten's city Akhetaten, in the floor of the Bureau of Correspondence of Pharaoh; others were later found, adding to the body of letters.

== The letter ==
=== EA 254: "Neither Rebel nor Delinquent (2)" ===
EA 254, letter three of three. (Not a linear, line-by-line translation, and English from French.)

Obverse: See here; Line drawing,

(Lines 1-5)–To the king, my lord and my Sun: Thus Lab'ayu, your servant and the dirt on which you tread. I fall at the feet of the king, my lord and my Sun, 7 times and 7 times.
(6-10)–I have obeyed (i.e. heard) the orders that the king wrote to me. Who am I that the king should lose his land on account of me?
(10-15)–The fact is that I am a loyal servant of the king! I am not a rebel and I am not delinquent in duty.^{1} I have not held back my payments of tribute; I have not held back anything requested by my commissioner.
(16-29)–He denounces me unjustly,^{3} but the king, my lord, does not examine my (alleged) act of rebellion.

Bottom & Reverse: See here; Line drawing,

(Lines 20-29)–Moreover, my act of rebellion is this: when I entered Gazru, I kept on saying, "Everything of mine the king takes, but where is what belongs to Milkilu?" I know the actions^{3} of Milkilu against me!
(30-37)–Moreover, the king wrote for my son.^{4} I did not know that my son was consorting with the 'Apiru. I herewith hand him over to Addaya.
(38-46)–Moreover, how, if the king wrote to me, "Put a bronze dagger into your heart and die," how could I not..

Left Side

(46)..execute the order of the king?^{5}–(complete EA 254, with no lacunae, lines 1-46)

== The Habiru/'Apiru ==

The mention of the Habiru shows the conflict of the time, as the takeover of city-states or regions by the Habiru. The map shows various cities and regions, and their respective dealings with the Habiru. (There are only 3 letters from Labaya of Šakmu/Shechem.) The next closest mention of the Habiru is from the Jerusalem letters of Abdi-Heba, directly south at Jerusalem, letters EA 286, 287, 288, 289, and EA 290.

=== Spellings for Habiru in the Amarna letters ===
- EA 100, l. 26—KUR,.. ša ìl-qú LÚ.MEŠ GAZ,.. [ ištu ]–.]–( LÚ-MEŠ GAZ )
- EA 271, l. 16—..lú-meš Sa-GaZ-meš .. ( Men (pl), SA.GAZ^{MEŠ(pl)}
- EA 290, l. 24—..Ha-Pí-Ri .. ( Hapiru ( 'Apiru ))
- EA 299, l. 18—..da-an-nu LÚ-SA-GAZ-meš .. ( "Strengthening" - LÚ.SA.GAZ.MEŠ ..( "Strengthening Habiru" )
- EA 366, l. 21—.. {LÚ} SA-GAZ .. ( ^{LÚ}SA-GAZ (Habiru))

== See also ==
- Shechem
- Amarna letter EA 252
- Amarna letters–phrases and quotations
