= Amarna letter EA 290 =

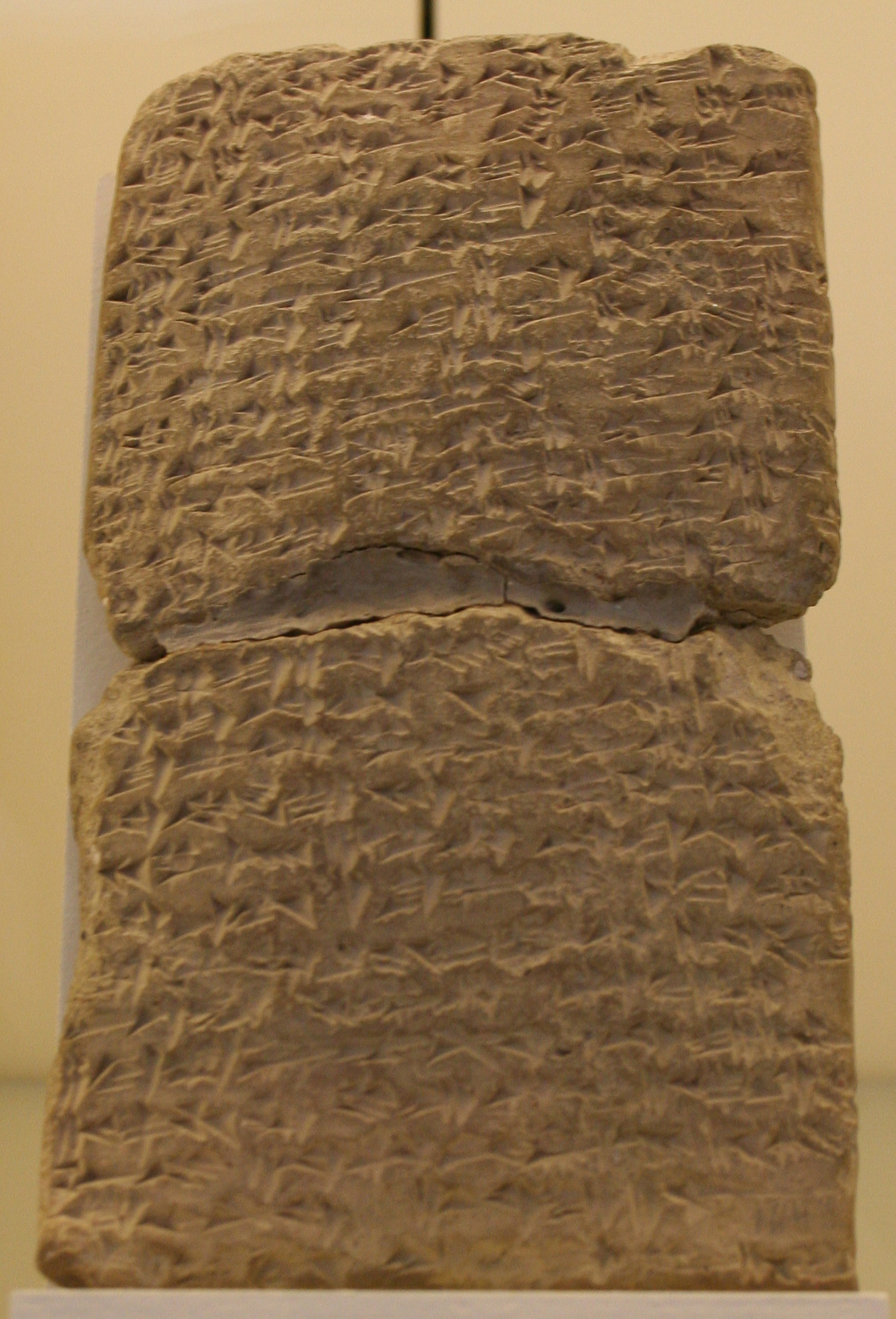
Amarna letter EA 288, from Abdi-Heba, letter 4 of 6 from Jerusalem. (very high-resolution expandable photo) (See EA 290 here-(Obverse & Reverse, and All the Sides !!): ),

Amarna letter EA 290, titled: "Three Against One", is one of the two shorter letters, of six, from Abdi-Heba the governing man of Jerusalem. In the Jerusalem letters, Jerusalem is "Uru-Salem" ("City-Peace").

Amarna letter EA 290, like Amarna letter EA 285 (The Soldier-Ruler of Jerusalem) are short "texts" compared to the long involved letters of EA 286, EA 287, EA 288, & EA 289.

The short letter of EA 290, summarizes the local discord of neighboring city-states and their rulers, and the problem with the warring Habiru ('Apiru). The letter is wider than it is tall, approximately 6.1 cm tall x 7.3 cm wide. It has some damage (lacunae), but not enough to obscure the short letter's story/

The Amarna letters, about 300, numbered up to EA 382, are a mid 14th century BC, about 1350 BC and 20–25 years later, correspondence. The initial corpus of letters were found at Akhenaten's city Akhetaten, in the floor of the Bureau of Correspondence of Pharaoh; others were later found, adding to the body of letters.

Letter EA 290 (also see here-(Obverse & Reverse): ), is numbered VAT 1646, from the Vorderasiatisches Museum Berlin.

== The letter ==
=== EA 290: "Three Against One" ===
EA 290, letter six of six. (Not a linear, line-by-line translation, and English from French.) (Obverse & Reverse):

Obverse: (See here: )

(Lines 1-4)—[Sa]y [t]o the king, my lord: Message of 'Abdi-Heba, your servant. I fall at the feet [of the kin]g, my lord, 7 times and 7 times. (i.e. "Over-and-over again")

(5-13)—Here is the deed against the land^{1} that Milkilu and Shuardata did: against the land of the king, my lord, they ordered^{2} troops from Gazru, troops from Gimtu, and troops from Qiltu. They seized Rubutu. The land of the king deserted to the Hapiru.

Reverse & Left Side: (See here: ) (Or here: )

(14)
(15-21)—And now, besides this, a town belonging to Jerusalem, Bit^{d}NIN-URTA by name, a city of the king, has gone over to the side of the men of Qiltu. May the king give heed to 'Abdi-Heba, your servant, and send archers to restore the land of the king to the king.

(22-30)—If there are no archers, the land of the king will desert to the Hapiru. This deed against the land^{3} was [a]t the order of Milki[lu and a]t the order^{4} of [Shuard]atu, [together w]ith Gint[i] .^{5} So may the king provide for [his] land.—(complete, EA 290, with restored minor lacunae, lines 1-30)

== The Habiru/'Apiru ==

The mention of the Habiru shows the conflict of the time, as the takeover of city-states or regions by the Habiru. The map shows various cities and regions, and their respective dealings with the Habiru. (There are only 3 letters from Labaya of Šakmu/Shechem.) The next closest mention of the Habiru is from the Jerusalem letters of Abdi-Heba, directly south at Jerusalem, letters EA 286, 287, 288, 289, and EA 290.

=== Spellings for Habiru in the Amarna letters ===
- EA 100, l. 26—KUR,.. ša ìl-qú LÚ.MEŠ GAZ,.. [ ištu ]–.]–( LÚ-MEŠ GAZ )
- EA 271, l. 16—..lú-meš Sa-GaZ-meš .. ( Men (pl), SA.GAZ^{MEŠ(pl)}
- EA 290, l. 24—..Ha-Pí-Ri .. ( Hapiru ( 'Apiru ))
- EA 299, l. 18—..da-an-nu LÚ-SA-GAZ-meš .. ( "Strengthening" - LÚ.SA.GAZ.MEŠ ..( "Strengthening Habiru" )
- EA 366, l. 21—.. {LÚ} SA-GAZ .. ( ^{LÚ}SA-GAZ (Habiru))

== See also ==
- Abdi-Heba
- Amarna letters–phrases and quotations
- List of Amarna letters by size (Jerusalem letter EA 288)

== Ext links ==
- Line drawing of EA 290, CDLI
- CDLI entry of EA 290 ( Chicago Digital Library Initiative )
- CDLI listing of all EA Amarna letters, 1-382
- VAT, Vorderasiatische Museum (Berlin) entry for EA 290; Views of Obverse, Reverse, & 2 sides, & with dimension rulers. (4 photos)
