= Pawura =

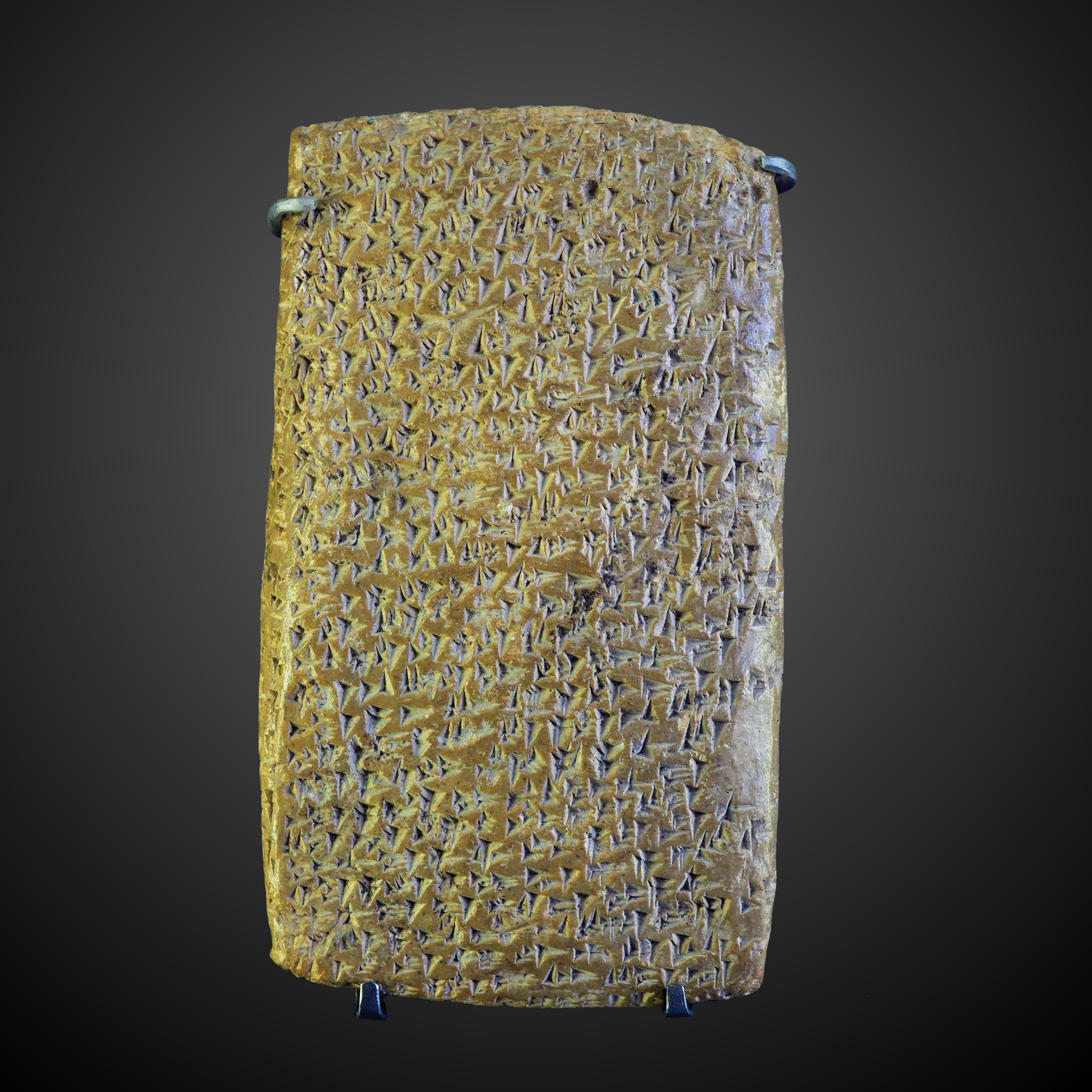
Amarna letter EA 362 (Reverse), photographed at the Louvre. Pawura is referenced near the end of the letter. (very high-resolution expandable photo)

Pawura, and also: Pauru, Piwure, Puuru/Puwuru was an Egyptian official of the 1350–1335 BC Amarna letters correspondence. As mentioned in letter no. 171, he was also an Egyptian "archer–commander". In letter no. 289 he is called an "irpi–official". In Egyptian his name means 'the Great One', (Pa-wr/Pa-ur)(letter EA 287:45-"1.-Pa-Ú-Ru")

Pawura's name is referenced in the following letters: (EA for 'el Amarna')

1. Rib-Haddi–The Rib-Hadda sub-corpus of 68 letters: EA 117, 124, 129, 131, 132, and EA 362.
2. Aziru–EA 171, by Aziru of Ammuru, Title: "Eager to Serve".
3. EA 263–EA 263, a short letter. Title: "Robbed of Everything." (author unknown)
4. Abdi-Heba–EA 287 and EA 289, letters by Abdi-Heba to pharaoh.(see EA 287 here: Photo, EA 287: Reverse)

Pawura's death is mentioned in the Rib-Hadda letters except EA 117, and 124, along with the demise of others, or the warring with the Habiru, or the leaders of Ammuru: (Abdi-Ashirta, or his son, Aziru).

== Example letters for: Official Pawura ==
=== EA 171, by Aziru of Ammuru--(no. 13 of 13) ===
EA 171, Title: "Eager to Serve", + (Yanhamu)

[To the king ...: Message of Aziru ...] ... I fall a[t the fee]t of the king, the Sun, my [lord]. [From the very first I ch]ose to enter [the servi]ce of the ki[ng], the [Su]n, my lord, [but Ya]nhamu would not a[ll]ow me. [I s]ent my mes[sen]gers [to] the king, my lord, [but] Yanhamu [stopped th]em on the way, and [they have not got away. May] the gods of the king, my lord, grant that my messengers get away [fr]om Yanhamu. I would enter the service of the king, the god, the Sun, my lord, but Yanhamu has not allowed me. And now O king, my lord, [Pu]wuru, [the archer ]–comman[der of the king, my lord, has reach]ed me. [Pu]wuru [knows] my [lo]yalty, and [may] the Sun, the king, my lord, [inquire from him] ... [...] May he tell them. For I am a servant of [the Sun, the king, my lord, and] wh[at]ever the ki[ng, the Sun, the king, my lord, orders], I d[o it ... May] the Sun, the king, my lord, [know: I am a loyal servant] of the king, my lord.
Moreover, my lord [...] Yanhamu when ... [...] ... I do not deviate from [his] orders or from th[is] servant of the Sun, the king, my lord. -EA 171, lines 1-37 (complete, with lacunae)

=== EA 289, by Abdi-Heba of Jerusalem--(no. 5 of 6) ===
EA 289, Title: "A Reckoning Demanded"

[Say t]o the king, my lord: Message of Abdi-Heba, your servant. I f[all] at the feet of my lord, the k[ing], 7 times and 7 times. Milkilu does not break away from the sons of Lab'ayu and from the sons of Arsawa, as they desire the land of the king for themselves. As for a mayor who does such a deed, why does the king not (c)all him to account? Such was the deed that Milkilu and Tagi did: –they took Rubutu. And now as for Jerusalem-(called "Uru-salim")(City-Salim), if this land belongs to the king, why is it (not) of concern to the king like Hazzatu-(modern Gaza)? Gintikirmil belongs to Tagi, and men of Gintu are the garrison in Bitsanu. Are we to act like Lab'ayu when he was giving the land of Šakmu-(Shechem) to the Hapiru? Milkilu has written to Tagi and the sons (of Lab'ayu)—"Be the both of you a protection. Grant all their demands to the men of Qiltu-(Keilah), and let us isolate Urusalim." Addaya has taken the garrison that you sent in the charge of Haya, the son of Miyare; he has stationed it in his own house in Hazzatu and has sent 20–men to Egypt (called 'Mizri'-(Mizraim)). May the king, my lord, know (that) no garrison of the king is with me. Accordingly, as truly as the king lives, his irpi-official, Pu'uru, has left me–and is in Hazzatu. (May the king call (this) to mind when he arrives.) And so may the king send 50–men as a garrison to protect the land. The entire land of the king has deser[ted]. (See: Upu). Send Ye(eh)enhamu that he may know about the land of the king, [my lord]. —To the scribe of the king, [my lord: M]essage of Abdi-Heba, [your] servant. Offer eloq[uent] words to the king: I am always, utterly yours. I am your servant. -EA 289, lines 1-51 (complete)

== See also ==
- Pítati
- Upu
- Addaya, Egyptian commissioner
- Yanhamu, Egyptian commissioner
