= Amarna letter EA 287 =

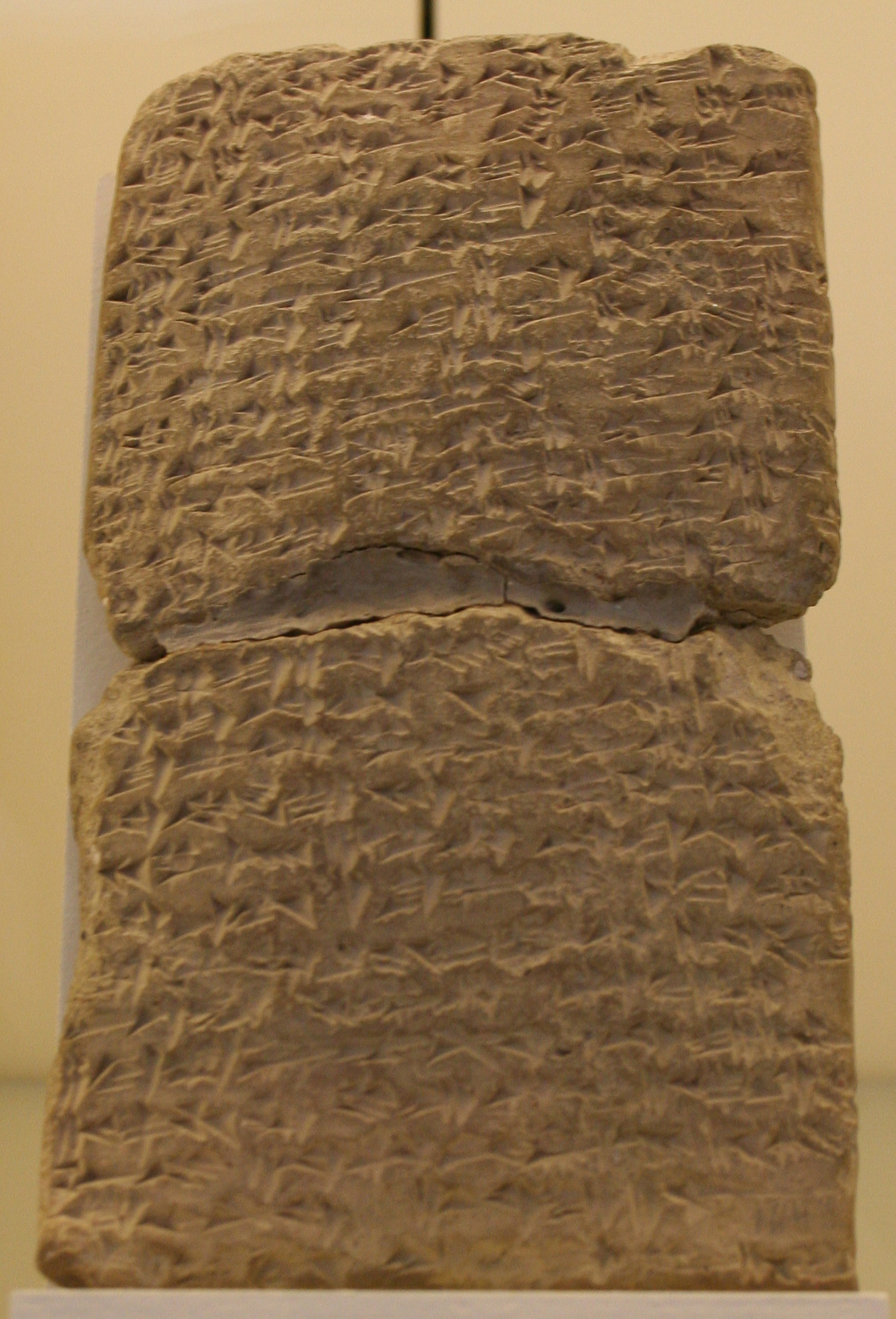
EA 288, from Abdi-Heba, letter 4 of 6 from Jerusalem. (very high-resolution expandable photo)

Amarna letter EA 287, titled: "A Very Serious Crime," is a tall, finely-inscribed clay tablet letter, approximately 8 in tall, from Abdi-Heba the mayor/ruler of Jerusalem, of the mid 14th century BC Amarna letters. The scribe of his six letters to Egypt were penned by the "Jerusalem scribe"; EA 287 is a moderately long, and involved letter. The Amarna letters, about 300, numbered up to EA 382, are a mid 14th century BC, about 1350 BC and 20–25 years later, correspondence. The initial corpus of letters were found at Akhenaten's city Akhetaten, in the floor of the Bureau of Correspondence of Pharaoh; others were later found, adding to the body of letters.

Letter EA 287 (see here-(Reverse): ), is numbered VAT 1644, from the Vorderasiatisches Museum Berlin.

== Glossenkeils ==
Glossenkeils used in letter 387:

Amarna letter EA 287	EA 287 Glossenkeil	EA 287 Akkadian language	translation
Amarna letter EA 287	Glossenkeil #1 line 27, Obverse	zu-ru-uh uh	arm
Amarna letter EA 287	Glossenkeil #2 line 56, Reverse	ša-de_{4}-e de_{4} e	countryside

== The letter ==
=== EA 287: "A Very Serious Crime" ===
EA 287, letter three of six. (Not a linear, line-by-line translation, and English from French.) (Obverse & Reverse):

Obverse:

(Lines 1–3)--[Say to the kin]g, m[y] lord: [Message of Abdi-Heba, yo[ur] servant. [I fall at the feet] of my lord 7 times and 7 times.
segue:
(4-9)--Consider] the ent(ire) affair.^{1,} [ Milkilu and Tagi brought [troop]s into [Qiltu] against me.^{2} [Consider] the deed that they did [to your servant].^{3} Arrow(s)^{4} [ ... ]
( ... lacuna )
( ... lacuna )
(10-12)--[..] they brought into [Qilt]u. May the [kin]g know (that) all the lands are [at] peace (with one another), but I am at war.
(13-13)--May the king provide for his land.
segue:
(14-19)--Consider the lands of Gazru, Ašqaluna, and L [akis]i.^{5} They have given them food, oils, and any other requirement. So may the king provide for archers and ^{6} send the archers against men that commit crimes against the king, my lord.
(20-24)--If this year there are archers, then the lands and the mayors will belong to the king, my lord. But if there are no archers, then the ki[ng] will have neither lands nor mayors.
segue:
(25-28)--Consider Jerusalem! This neither my father nor m[y] mother gave to me. The [str]ong hand :(gloss) zu-ru-uh (arm) [of the king] gave to me.^{7}
segue:
(29-31)--Consider the deed! This is the deed of Milkilu and the deed of the sons(=cohorts) of Lab'ayu, who have given the land of the king (to) the 'Apiru.
segue:
(32-32)--Consider, O king, my lord! I am in the right!^{8}
(33-42)--With regard to the Kašites, may the king make inquiry of the commissioners. Though the house is well fortified, they attempted a very serious crime. They [t]ook their tools, and I had to seek shelter by a support^{9} for the roof :(gloss) ga-ag-gi. A[nd so i]f he is going to send troop]s into [Jerusalem], let them come with [a garrison for] (regular) service.^{10} May the king provide for them; [all] of the land might be in dire straits^{11} on their account.

bottom, obverse: 38–40:
Reverse: (line 41)

(43-49)--May the king inquire about the[m. Let there be]^{12} much food, much oil, much clothing until Pauru, the commissioner of the king, comes up to Jerusalem. Gone^{13} is Addaya together with the garrison of soldiers [that] the king [pro]vided. May the king know (that) Addaya [sa]id to me,
segue:
(50-52)--"[Beh]old, he has dismissed me."^{14} Do not abandon it, [and] send this [year] a garrison, and send right here^{15} the commissioner of the king.
(53-59)--I sent [ as gift]s^{16} to the king, my lord, [x] prisoners, 5000...[...],^{17} [and] 8 porters^{18} for the caravans of the k[ing, my lord], but they have been taken in the countryside: a-de_{4}-e of Ayyaluna. May the king, my lord, know (that) I am unable to send a caravan to the king, my lord. For you information!
segue:
(60-63)--As the king has placed his name in Jerusalem forever, he cannot abandon it—the land of Jerusalem.^{19}
(64-70)--Say to the scribe of the king, my lord: Message of 'Abdi-Heba, your servant. I fall at (your) feet. I am your servant. Present eloquent words to the king, my lord: I am a soldier of the king. I am always yours.^{20}
(71-78)--And please make the Kašites responsible for the evil deed.^{21} I was almost killed by the Kašites [i]n my own house. May the king [make an inquiry] in the[ir] regard. [May the kin]g, my lord, [provide] for them. 7 times and 7 times my the king, my lord, [provide] for me.^{22}(complete, EA 287, many minor, restored lacunae, lines 1–78)

== Akkadian text ==
The Akkadian language text: (starting at line 1, obverse, and line 39, reverse)

Akkadian:

Obverse:

(Line 1)--[ Ana 1.^{diš} ŠÀR ]RU Bēlu-ia qabû ]--(To 1.-King-Lord-mine,..Speak!)
(2)--[ umma ] 1.^{diš}Abdi-Hiba ARAD-ka[-ma ana ]--('message thus' Abdi-Heba, "The Servant-yours", at..)
(3)--[ _ _ šēpu-meš ] Bēlu-ia 7 ta-[a-an ú 7 ta-a-an maqātu ]--( _ _ feet(pl), My-Lord, 7 times and 7 times,.. I bow!..)
segue
(4)--[ a-mur ] gáb((bi)) amatu_{5} [ ša ŠÀRRU Bēlu-ia ]--(Look!.. (all)"the entire affair" that ŠÀRRU Bēlu-ia)
(5)--[ ú-še-]-ru-bu-ni ana [ __ __ __ ]-meš
segue
(6)--amur epišu : ša e-[ -pu-šu ]
(7)--URUDU-gag-ú-tag-ga : [ __ __ ]
(8)--[ __ __ ] a-wa-tu [ __ __ ]
(9)--[ lacuna ]
(10)--[ lacuna ]
(11)--ana ^{URU}-[Qi-eL]-Ti-^{ki} ešeru idû ŠÀRRU--(into ^{City}Qiltu, brought!.. Know, king)
(12)--gábbi mātu-HI.A(pl) šalāmu!.. Ana iāši nukurtu--(all lands(pl) "in peace"! .. For me: 'Warfare'!)
(13)--ù šakānu ŠÀRRU ana mātu-šu--(and "provide" king for Land-his!.. )
segue
(14)--Amur KUR ^{URU}GAZ-Ri^{ki} KUR ^{URU}AŠ-Qa-Lu-Na^{ki}--(Look!..(amāru!)..Land ^{City}Gazru, Land ^{City}Ashkelon)
(15)--ù ^{URU}La-[Ki]-Ši-^{ki} i-din-nu(?dīnu) ana šašû--(and ^{City}Lakisha,.. 'the case' for them:..)
(16)--NÍG-HI.A(pl) I'3-HI.A(pl) ù mimmû gl (AL)(gloss) ma-ah-șí-ra-mu(mahāṣu)--(("provide")-food(pl), oils(pl) and everything('possessions') "and"(gloss) "to fight!")
(17)--ù šakānu ŠÀRRU, ana ERIM-pi-ṭa-ti ú(=ú)--(and 'provide' King, for "Army-Archers" (=and))
(18)--muššuru ERIM-pi-ṭa-ti ana amēlu-MEŠ--(send(issue) "Army-Archers" "to" Men(pl))
(19)--ša epēšu arnu ana ŠÀRRU, Bēlu-ia--(who 'conducted' "evil(deeds)" at King-Lord-Mine! ...)
(20)--šumma bâ'u ina MU(=šattu) annû--(If 'to happen' in YEAR-this...)

Reverse:

(Line 39)--^{10}[ERIN2]-MEŠ ti-ta-lu it-ti# [LÚ ma-ṣar-ti ]
(40)--[ a-na ] ARAD-MEŠ li-is-kín-mi# [ LUGAL ri ]^{10}
(41)--a-na ša-šu-nu ^{11}ta-șa-qa^{11} [ ... ]
(42)--KUR-HI.A i-na qa-ti-šu-nu# [ ù ]
(43)--^{12}li-iš-al-mi^{12} LUGAL ri a-na ša-šu-[-nu lu-ú]
(44)--ma-ad NÌG-HI.A ma-ad Ì-HI.A ma-ad TÚG-HI.A-ti—(much food(pl), much oils(pl), much clothing(pl))
(45)--a-di e-tel-li 1. Pa-Ú-Ru [lú]-maškim2 LUGAL ri—('before'(until) "youth?"/'young-man' 1.-Pa-Ú-Ru(Pawura) man-commissioner, [of the] king..)
(46)--a-na KUR-^{URU}-Ǘ-Ru-SA_{10}-lim-^{ki} ^{13}pa-ța-a-ri^{13}—(to LAND-^{city}Uru-Salim^{ki}-(Jerusalem) ... Gone...)
(47)--[ 1. ..A ]-Da-Ya a-di LÚ-meš-ma-șar-ti LÚ-ú-e-e—([1. "A"]-Da-Ya 'with'(plus) men(pl)-garrison men-[of]-soldiers)
(48)--[ ša i-]din LUGAL ri li-de_{4} LUGAL ri
(49)--[iq-bi a-na ia-a-ši 1.-A-Da-Ya
segue
(50)--amur ^{14} pa-aț-ra-an-ni la ti-iz-ib-ši
(51)--[ mu ] an-ni-ta mu-še-ra-an-ni LÚ ma-ṣar-ta

== See also ==
- Abdi-Heba
- Addaya
- Pawura
- Glossenkeil (Amarna letters)
- Amarna letters–phrases and quotations
