= Rubutu =

Settlement in ancient northern Israel

Rubutu was a city, or city-state located in the southern region of Palestine between the city of Gazru-(modern Gezer), and Jerusalem during the time of the Amarna letters correspondence, a 15-20 year period at about 1350-1335 BC. Some scholars place Rubutu near present-day Arrabah in the northern West Bank. Nadav Na'man writes that this Rubutu, mentioned in the Ta'anach tablets, is a separate site from that in the Amarna tablets but shares the same name.

The Amarna letters were mostly written to the pharaoh of Ancient Egypt, and three mayors of Gazru: Abimilku, Milkilu, and Yapahu authored 20 letters of the 382–letter, Amarna letters corpus. The reference to Rubutu is found in 2 letters of Abdi-Heba of Jerusalem, EA 289, and 290, (EA for 'el Amarna'). They mention the war of various cities, the Habiru, and of: "the seizure of Rubutu".

== The 2 letters of city--Rubutu ==
=== EA 289, title: "A reckoning demanded" ===
EA 289 is letter no. 5 of 6 to the Pharaoh, by Abdi-Heba of Jerusalem. See: Egyptian official: Pawura.

=== EA 290, title: "Three against one" ===
Letter no. 6 of 6 by Abdi-Heba of Urusalim:

"[Sa]y [t]o the king-(i.e. pharaoh), my lord: Message of ['Abdi]-Heba, your servant. I fall at the feet [of the kin]g, my lord, 7 times and 7 times. Here is the deed against the land that Milkilu and Šuardatu did: against the land of the king, my lord, they ordered troops from Gazru, troops from Gimtu, and troops from Qiltu-(Keilah). They seized Rubutu. The land of the king deserted to the Hapiru. And now, besides this, a town belonging to Jerusalem-(called Urusalim), Bit-^{d}NIN.URTA by name, a city of the king, has gone over to the side of the men of Qiltu. May the king give heed to Abdi-Heba, your servant, and send archers to restore the land of the king to the king. If there are no archers, the land of the king will desert to the Hapiru. This deed against the land was [a]t the order of Milki[lu and a]t the order of [Šuard]atu, [together w]ith Gint[i] -(i.e. the city). So may the king provide for [his] land." -EA 290, lines 1-30 (complete)

The city "Bit-^{d}NIN.URTA" is linked to cuneiform as: city: "Home of God–Ninurta", (Bit-^{d}NIN.URTA).

== See also ==
- Milkilu, mayor of Gazru
- Šuwardata, mayor
- Amarna letters
- Amarna letters–localities and their rulers
