= Amarna letter EA 289 =

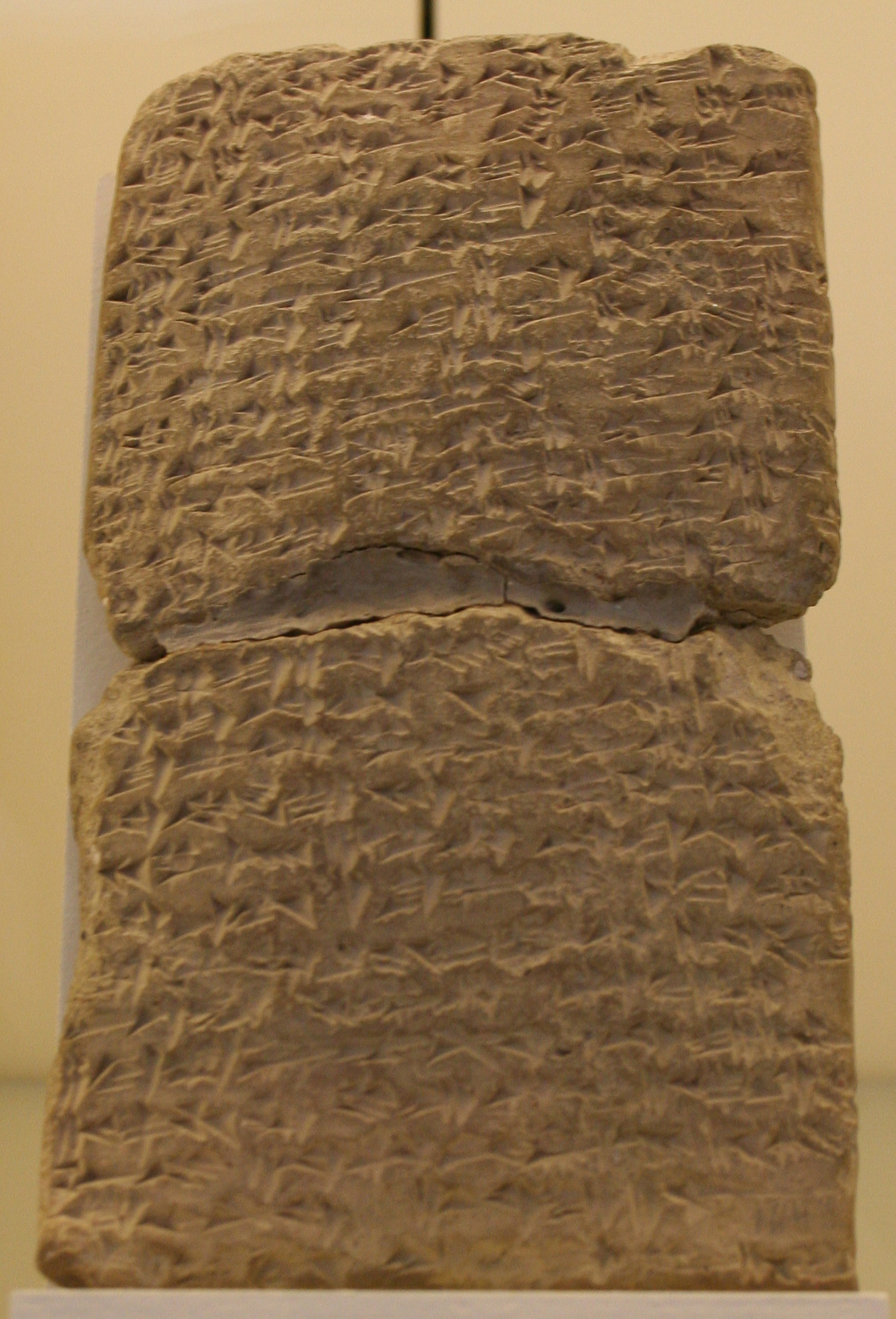
EA 288, from Abdi-Heba, letter 4 of 6 from Jerusalem. (very high-resolution expandable photo)

Amarna letter EA 289, titled: "A Reckoning Demanded," is a moderately tall, finely-inscribed clay tablet letter, approximately 6.5 in tall, from Abdi-Heba the mayor/ruler of Jerusalem, of the mid 14th century BC Amarna letters. The scribe of his six letters to Egypt were penned by the "Jerusalem scribe"; EA 289 is a moderately long, and involved letter, mentioning ten named individuals, some more than three times. A total of nine locations are referenced, as well as men of the "Hapiru"-("LÚ-MEŠ-Hapiru-^{ki}"), and men of "Qilyi-^{ki}".

The Amarna letters, about 300, numbered up to EA 382, are a mid 14th century BC, about 1350 BC and 20–25 years later, correspondence. The initial corpus of letters were found at Akhenaten's city Akhetaten, in the floor of the Bureau of Correspondence of Pharaoh; others were later found, adding to the body of letters.

Letter EA 289 (see here-(Obverse): ), is numbered VAT 1645, from the Vorderasiatisches Museum Berlin.

== The letter ==
=== EA 289: "A Reckoning Demanded" ===
EA 289, letter five of six. (Not a linear, line-by-line translation, and English from French.)

(Lines 1-4)--[Say t]o the king, my lord: Message of 'Abdi-Heba, your servant. I f[all] at the feet of my lord, the k[ing], 7 times and 7 times.
(5-10)Milkilu does not break away from the sons of Labaya and from the sons of Arsawa, as they desire the land of the king for themselves. As for a mayor who does such a deed, why does the king not (c)all him to account?
(11-17)--Such was the deed that Milkilu and Tagi did: they took Rubutu. And now as for Jerusalem-(^{URU}Uru-Salim^{ki}), if this land belongs to the king, why is it ((not)) of concern^{1} to the king like Hazzatu?
(18-24)--Ginti-kirmil belongs to Tagi, and men of Gintu are the garrison in Bitsanu.^{2} Are we to act like Labaya when he was giving the land of Šakmu to the Hapiru?
(25-36)--Milkilu has written to Tagi and the sons ((of Labaya)), "Be the both of you a protection.^{3} Grant all their demands to the men of Qiltu, and let us isolate Jerusalem."^{4} Addaya has taken the garrison that you sent in the charge of Haya, the son of Miyare; he has stationed it in his own house in Hazzatu and has sent 20 men to Egypt-(Miṣri). May the king, my lord, know (that) no garrison of the king is with me.
(37-44)--Accordingly, as truly as the king lives, his irpi- official,^{5} Pu'uru, has left me and is in Hazzatu. (May the king call (this) to mind when he arrives.)^{6} And so may the king send 50 men as a garrison to protect the land. The entire land of the king has deser[ted].
(45-46)--Send Ye((eh))enhamu that he may know about the land of the king, [my lord].

(47-51)--To the scribe of the king, [my lord: M]essage of 'Abdi-Heba, [your] servant, Offer eloq[uent] words to the king: I am always, utterly yours.^{7} I am your servant.--(text complete Obverse & Reverse, EA 289, minor, restored lacunae, (and a small corner of clay tablet missing), lines 1-51)

== List of Individuals, Places, or Peoples in EA 289 ==
A list of the people of EA 289, cities, towns, or countries, and equivalent 'groups of peoples':

Individuals:

- --Line 2--1.-ARAD-Hi-Ba-(Abdi-Heba)
- --5--1.-Mil-Ki-Lim-(Milkilu)
- --6--La-AB-A-Ya-(Labaya)
- --7--Ar-SÀ-Wa
- --11–1.-Mil-Ki-Lim
- --11–1.-Ta-Gi-(Tagi (Ginti mayor))
- --19–1.-Ta-Gi
- --21–1.La-AB-A-Ya
- --25–1.-Mil-Ki-Lim
- --25—Ta-Gi
- --31–1.-Ha-Ya
  - --31—DUMU-Mi-iYa-Re-E-(Miyare)
- --32–1.-Ad-Da-Ya-(Addaya)
- --38–1.-Pu-Ú-Ru-(Pawura)
- --45–1.-Yi-((..))-En-Ha-Mu-(Yanhamu)
- --48–1.-ARAD-Hi-Ba

Placenames or Peoples:

- --13--^{URU}-Ru-Bu-Tá-(Rubutu)
- --14--^{URU}-Ǘ-Ru-Sa-Lim-^{ki}-(Jerusalem)
  –(Uru-Salem)
- --17--^{URU}-Ha-Za-TI--^{ki}-(Hazor)(Tel Hazor)
- --18—KUR-^{URU}-GÍN-Ti-Ki-iR-Mi-iL-^{ki}
- --19--^{URU}-GÍN-Yi-^{ki}
- --23—KUR-Ša-aK-Mi-(Shechem)
- --24—LÚ-MEŠ-Ha-Pí-Ri-^{ki}-(Hapiru)
- --28—LÚ-MEŠ-Qí-iL-Yi-^{ki}-(Qiltu-(Keilah))
- --29--^{URU}-Ǘ-Ru-Sa-Lim
- --33--^{URU}-Ha-Za-Yi-^{ki}
- --34—KUR-Mi-iṢ-Ri-^{ki}-(Egypt)(Miṣri)(Mizraim)
- --40--^{URU}-Ha-Za-Ti (Gaza)

== Akkadian text ==
The Akkadian language text:

Akkadian:

Tablet Obverse:

(Line 1)--Ana Šarru(ŠÀR-ri) bēlu-ia [qabû]--(To King-Lord-mine-["speaking"])
(2)--umma 1.(diš)-ARAD-Hi-Ba 1.ARAD-ka-ma--('message thus' Abdi-Heba, servant-[yours],)
(3)--ana 2.-šēpu(pl) bēlu-ia ma[qātu]--(at 2-feet(pl), my-Lord, I b[ow]([am bowing],..))
(4)--7 ta-a-an ù 7 ta-a-an--(7 times and 7 times (again).)

segue:

(5)--(amāru)(amur(=AMAR)) 1.-Milkilu lā patāru--(Look!..Milkilu not "separating")
(6)--ištu māru(sons/compatriots)-(pl) Labaya ù [ištu]--(from accomplices (of) Labaya and from)
(7)--māru(sons)(pl) Arsawa ana erēšu--(accomplices(pl) (of) Arsawa to "desiring"(requesting))
(8)--mātu Šarru(ŠÀR-ri)(LUGAL-ri) ana šašu--(Land (of the) King for themselves;..)
(9)--LÚ-hazzanu ša epišu-annû--((a)-Mayor which/that "Deed This",..)
(10)--amminu ŠÀR-ri lā ?xx?--(..Why?.. King not concerned?..)

segue:

(11)--(amāru)(amur(=AMAR)) 1.-Milkilu and 1.-Tagi--(Look!.. Milkilu and Tagi)
(12)--epišu ša epēšu annû--("deed" which performed this:....)
(13)--Enuma leqû ^{URU}-Rubutu-^{ki}--("Now-(at-this-time)" "conquered" city-state Rubutu^{ki},..)
(14)--ù eninna ^{URU}-Jerusalem-^{ki}--(and "now-when" city-state Jerusalem^{ki},)
(15)--šumma bašu mātu annû--(If 'to exist' Land this..?..)
(16)--ana Šarru(ŠÀR-ri), ammini enuma--(for King,..When "now-(at-this-time)")
(17)--^{URU}-Hazor-^{ki} ana Šarru(ŠÀR-ri) šakānu--(city-state Hazor 'for/when' (the) King emplaced?!..)

segue:

(18)--(amāru)(amur(=AMAR)) mātu ^{URU}-Ginti-Kirmil-^{ki}--(Look!.. Land City-state Ginti-Kirmil)
(19)--ana 1.-Tagi ù LÚ-MEŠ-^{URU}-GÍNyi-^{ki}--(of Tagi, and "Men(pl)-GÍNyi-^{ki}",..)
(20)--maṣșartu ina bītu bašu--((a) 'garrison' "house-seat" 'exists',..)
(21)--ù lū(lū-ú) napaṣu enūma--(and, "May it Be-'to crush' ", Now,..)
(22)--___ __1.-Labaya..--(space(pl)..Labaya..!)

Tablet bottom:

(23)--Ú kur-Ša-aK-Mi i-tin-u--(But,..land Šakmu-(Shechem) sided)
(24)--ana LÚ.MEŠ-Hapíri^{ki}--(to (the) Men(pl)-Habiru^{ki})

Tablet Reverse:

Note: The endings of lines 1-4 are the missing corner of the clay tablet letter, and the words-(lacunas) are replaced by context, and the common style of the 'introductions' of the Amarna letters. Of note, only the obverse of letter EA 289 uses the segues of Look!, Akkadian language amāru. An equivalent use is on the start of the reverse of EA 365, for the entire end-story of EA 365. The "segue"-use there is "And Look!",..."But, Look...", using "u" "amāru"; (only text on a short line, bottom of tablet reverse, very start of the flat reverse side).

== See also ==
- Abdi-Heba
- Addaya
- Pawura
- Yanhamu
- Milkilu
- Amarna letters–phrases and quotations
