= Amarna letter EA 286 =

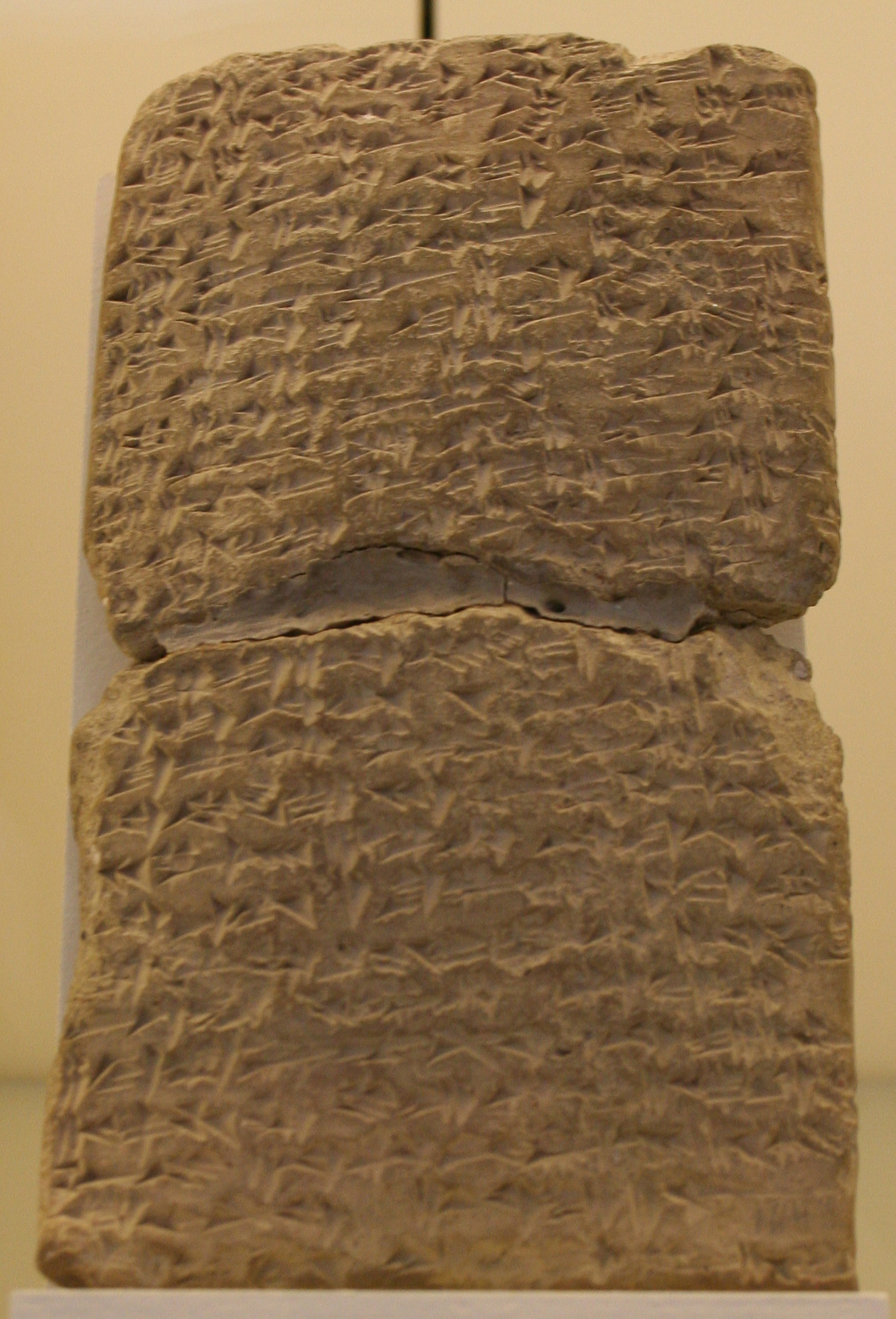
EA 288, from Abdi-Heba, letter 4 of 6 from Jerusalem. (very high-resolution expandable photo)

Amarna letter EA 286, titled: "A Throne Granted, Not Inherited," is a tall, finely-inscribed clay tablet letter, approximately 8 in tall, and 3.5 in wide, from Abdi-Heba the mayor/ruler of Jerusalem, of the mid-14th-century BC Amarna letters. The scribe of his six letters to Egypt were penned by the "Jerusalem scribe"; EA 286 is a moderately long, and involved letter.

Unlike similarly-lengthed letters by the Jerusalem scribe, (EA 287, EA 288, and shorter EA 289), EA 286 is damaged over the entire surface by erosion, probably from moisture. Other small sections of the clay tablet letter are missing entirely, with text supplied by the story's context.

The Amarna letters, about 300, numbered up to EA 382, are a mid-14th-century BC correspondence from about 1350 BC and 20–25 years later. The initial corpus of letters were found at Akhenaten's city, Akhetaten, in the floor of the Bureau of Correspondence of Pharaoh; others were later found, adding to the body of letters.

Letter EA 286 (see here-(Obverse & Reverse): ), is numbered VAT 1642, from the Vorderasiatisches Museum Berlin.

== Letter ==
=== EA 286: "A Throne Granted, Not Inherited" ===
EA 286, letter two of six. (Not a linear, line-by-line translation, and English from French.) (Obverse & reverse):

Obverse (see here: )

1. Say [t]o the king, my lord:
2. Message of Abdi-Heba, your servant.
3. I fall at the feet of my lord, the king,
4. 7 times and 7 times.
5. What have I done to the king, my lord?
6. They denounce me: [ú-ša-a-ru]
7. before the king, my lord, "Abdi-Heba
8. has rebelled against the king, his lord."
9. Seeing that, as far as I am concerned, neither my father
10. nor my mother put me
11. in this place,
12. but the strong arm of the king
13. brought me into my father's house,
14. why should I of all people commit
15. a crime against the king, my lord?
16. As truly as the king, my lord, lives,
17. I say to the commissioner of the king, [my] lord, "Why do you love the
18. 'Apiru, but the mayors
19. you hate?" Accordingly,
20. I am slandered before the king, my lord.
21. Because I say, "Lost are
22. the lands of the king, my lord," accordingly
23. I am slandered before the king, my lord.
24. May the king, my lord, know that
25. (though) the king, my lord stationed
26. a garrison (here),
27. Enhamu has taken i[t al]l away. [ ... ]

Reverse, (see here: )

32. [Now], O king, my lord,
33. [there is n]o garrison,
34. [and so] may the king provide for his land.
35. May the king [pro]vide for his land! All the [la]nds of
36. the king, my lord, have deserted. Ili-Milku
37. has caused the loss of all the land of the king,
38. and so may the king, my lord, provide for his land.
39. For my part, I say, "I would go
40. in to the king, my lord, and visit
41. the king, my lord," but the war
42. against me is severe, and so I am not able
43. to go in to the king, my lord.
44. And may it seem good in the sight of the king,
45. [and] may he send a garrison
46. so I may go in and visit
47. the king, my lord. In truth, the king, my lord,
48. lives: whenever the commissioners have come out,
49. I would say (to them), "Lost are the lands of the king,"
50. but they did not listen to me.
51. Lost are all the mayors;
52. there is not a mayor remaining to the king, my lord.
53. May the king turn his attention to the archers
54. so that archers
55. of the king, my lord, come forth. The king has no lands.
56. (The) 'Apiru have plundered all the lands of the king.
57. If there are archers
58. this year, the lands of
59. the king, my lord, will remain. But if there are no archers,
60. lost are the lands of the king, my lord.
61. [T]o the scribe of the king, my lord: Message of Abdi-Heba,
62. your [ser]vant. Present eloquent
63. words to the king, my lord. Lost
64. are all the lands of the king, my lord.

== Akkadian text ==
The Akkadian language text: (starting at line 1)

Akkadian:

Obverse:

(Line 1)--[ A ]na 1.^{diš} ŠÀRRU Bēlu-ia qabû--(To 1.-King-Lord-mine,..Speak!)
(2)--umma 1.^{diš}Abdi-Hiba ARAD-ka-ma--('message thus' 1.-Abdi-Heba, "The Servant-yours",.. )
(3)--ana 2^{diš} šēpu-meš Bēlu-ia ŠÀRRU--(at 2 feet(pl), My-Lord, King, )
(4)--7^{diš} ta-a-an ù 7^{diš} ta-a-an maqātu!--(7 times and 7 times again, I bow!... )ú-ša-a-ru--("
(5)--Mannu epēšu ana ŠÀRRU Bēlu-ia--("What (done)'did I do' to King-Lord-Mine?".. )
(6)--akālu ka-ar-și-ya :–(gloss) eaten stomach"('my parts are eaten') :–(gloss) "I am slandered!".. )
(7)--ina pānu ŠÀRRU Bēlu-ia 1.^{diš} Abdi-Hi-Ba--(.. before (the) King-Lord-Mine!" 1.-Abdi-Heba)
(8)--patāru ana ŠÀRRI Bēlu-šu--("rebelled" 'against' King, His Lord!..)
segue:
(9)--Amāru! anāku lā LÚ-abu--(Look!.. I(myself),.. not Father.. )
(10)--ù lā MUNUS ummu :–(gloss) šakānu--(nor (not) Mother :–(gloss) "was emplaced!".. )
(11)--ina ašru annu--("into" 'region'/site-this,.. )
(12)--zu-ru-uh ŠÀRRI KAL.GA(=dannu)--("arm" (of) King 'strong')
(13)--ešēru ana É(=bītu) LÚ-abu--("put straight"(enthroned) into HOUSE (of) Father.)
(14)--Ammini ana epēšu--(Who?.. "against" conducted(deed)?.. )
(15)--:–(gloss) arnu ana ŠÀRRU Bēlu-ri--(:–(gloss) 'evil crime' against King, Lord-(ri).?.. )
(16)--Adi ŠÀRRU Bēlu-ia tilla--(As King-Lord-Mine "lives"(and breaths)..)
(17)--Qabû ana LÚ-MAŠKIM2 ŠÀRRU Bēlu-ia--("Say" to 'Man-Commissioner' (of) King-Lord-Mine.. )
(18)--Ammini r'āmu--(..Why "do you love".. )
(19)--LÚ-HAPÍRI ù LÚ-MEŠ-Ha-zi-[-ianuti ]--(..(the) Man-HAPIRU?.. and (the) MEN-Governors.. )
(20)--ta-za-ia-ru ù kinānnu--("Hate"('fight battles' and defeat('wrap up')))
(21)--ú-ša-a'3-ru ina pānu--("I am slandered" before King-Lord-Mine)
(22)--enūma yi?qabû:.. "halāqu--('Now'(Because) I say: "Lost.. )
(23)--KUR-HI.A ŠÀRRU Bēlu-ia kinānnu--(..(the) Land(s)(pl), King-Lord-Mine: "Defeated"!.. )
(24)--ú-ša-wa-ru ana ŠÀRRU Bēlu-ia--(.."I am slandered" before King-Lord-Mine!.. )
(25)--ù lētu ŠÀRRU Bēlu-ia--(..But (I) "side" (with) King-Lord-Mine!... )
(26)--enūma šakānu ŠÀRRU Bēlu-ia--("Now-(at-this-time)" (the)-'stationed'(emplaced) King-Lord-Mine,.. )
(27)--LÚ-MEŠ-ma-ṣar-ta leqû--(garrison-(men(pl)) taken(defeated).. )
(28)--[ gáb-]bi 1.^{diš} YANHAMU--(..all (by) 1.-Yanhamu.. )
(29)--[ ... (lacuna) ]
(30)--[ ... (lacuna) ]

Reverse:

== See also ==
- Abdi-Heba
- Milkilu
- Yanhamu
- Amarna letters–phrases and quotations
