= Yanhamu =

Yanhamu, also Yenhamu, and Enhamu, was an Egyptian commissioner of the 1350-1335 BC Amarna letters correspondence.

== Biography ==
=== Amarna Archive ===
Yanhamu is referenced in 16 of the 60–letter "Rib-Hadda of Gubla"-(Byblos) sub-corpus, and also 12 additional letters.

==== Milkilu's EA 270, "Extortion" ====
Letter no. 4 of 5 to Pharaoh, from "Milkilu of Gazru"-(modern Gezer):

Say to the king, my lord, my god, my Sun: Message of Milkilu, your servant, the dirt at your feet. I fall at the feet of the king, my lord, my god, my Sun, 7 times and 7 times. May the king, my lord know the deeds that Yanhamu keeps doing to me since I left the king, my lord. He indeed wants 2000 shekels of silver from me, and he says to me, "Hand ov[er] your wife and your sons, or I will kill (you). May the king know of this deed, and may the king, my lord, send chariots and fetch me to himself lest I perish.

— EA 270, lines 1-29 (complete)

==== Milkilu's EA 271, "The Power of the 'Apiru" ====
Milkilu letter no. 5 of 5 to Pharaoh:

Say to the king, my lord, my god, my Sun: Message of Milkilu, your servant, the dirt at your feet. I fall at the feet of the king, my lord, 7 times and 7 times. May the king, my lord, know that the war against me and against Šuwardata is severe. So may the king, my lord, save his land from the power of the 'Apiru-(Habiru). O[th]erwise, may the king, my lord, send chariots to fetch u[s] lest our servants kill us. Moreover, may the king, my lord, ask Yanhamu, his servant, about what is bein[g] done in his [l]and.

— EA 271, lines 1-27 (complete)

==== Referenced Amarna letters to Yanhamu ====
The largest sub-corpus of Amarna letters is from the Rib-Haddi corpus: namely "Rib-Hadda of Gubla"-(Byblos). 16 of Rib-Haddi's letters reference Yanhamu, (EA for 'el Amarna').

Letters EA 82-132(16)
the Rib-Hadda/Byblos letters-(w/out-EA 98)

- EA 82—
- EA 85—
- EA 86—
- EA 98—
- EA 102—
- EA 105—
- EA 106—
- EA 109—
- EA 116—
- EA 117—
- EA 118—
- EA 127—
- EA 131—
- EA 132—See: Pahura

Other letters:

- EA 98—See: Yapa-Hadda
- ----
- EA 171—See: Pawura
- EA 215—
- EA 256—
- EA 270—Milkilu no. 4 of 5 to pharaoh.
- EA 271—Milkilu no. 5 of 5 to pharaoh.
- EA 283—See: Šuwardata
- EA 284—
- EA 285—
- EA 286—
- EA 289—See: Pawura
- EA 286—See: Yabitiri
- EA 366—See: Šuwardata

== See also ==
- Milkilu
- Rib-Hadda of Gubla/Byblos
- Amarna letters
- Text corpus
