= EN (cuneiform) =

Sumerian cuneiform for 'lord' or 'priest'

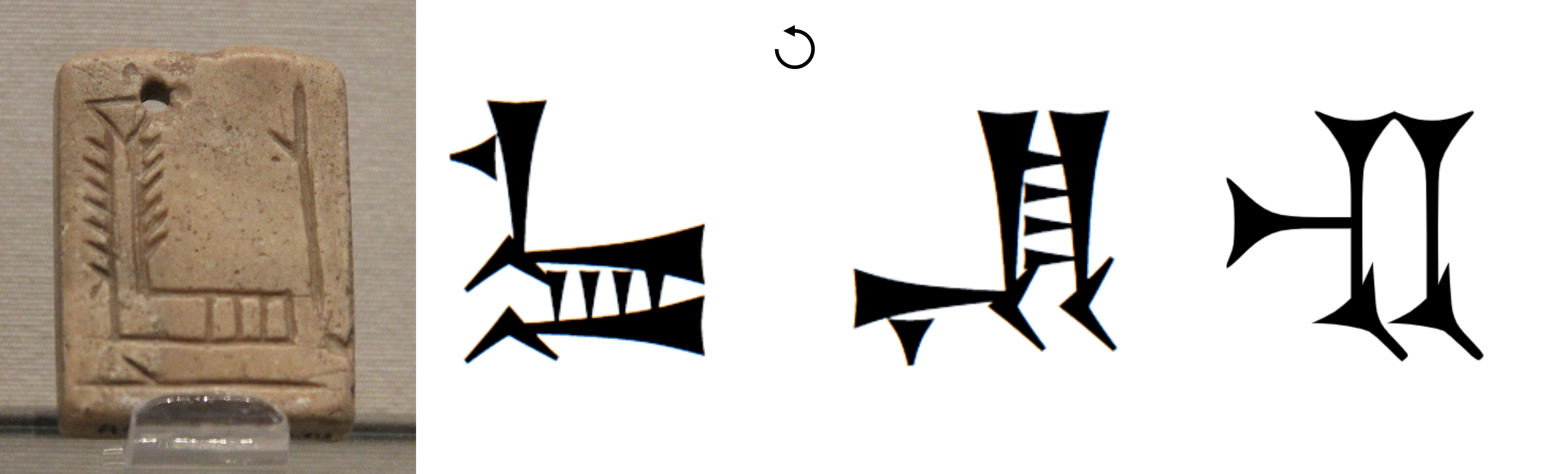
Cuneiform sign "EN", for "Lord" or "Master": evolution from the pictograph of a throne circa 3000 BC on a plaque in the name of Goddess Inanna, followed by simplification and rotation down to circa 600 BC.

En (Borger 2003 nr. 164; U+12097 𒂗, see also Ensí) is the Sumerian cuneiform for 'lord/lady' or 'priest[ess]'. Originally, it seems to have been used to designate a high priest or priestess of a Sumerian city-state's patron-deity – a position that entailed political power as well. It may also have been the original title of the ruler of Uruk. See Lugal, ensi and en for more details.

Deities including En as part of their name include ^{D}Enlil, ^{D}Enki, ^{D}Engurun, and ^{D}Enzu.

Enheduanna, Akkadian 2285 BC – 2250 BC was the first known holder of the title En, here meaning 'Priestess'.

== Archaic forms ==
The corresponding Emesal dialect word was UMUN, which may preserve an archaic form of the word. Earlier Emeg̃ir (the standard dialect of Sumerian) forms can be postulated as *ewen or *emen, eventually dropping the middle consonant and becoming the familiar EN.

== Amarna letters: bêlu ==
The 1350 BC Amarna letters use EN for bêlu, though not exclusively. The more common spelling is mostly be + li, to make bêlí, or its equivalent. Some example letters using cuneiform EN are letters EA (for El Amarna) 252, EA 254, and EA 282, titled: "A demand for recognition", by Abimilku; "Neither rebel or delinquent" (2), by Labayu; and "Alone", by Shuwardata.

Most of the uses are in the letter introduction, formulaic addresses to the pharaoh, stating typically to effect:

"To the king [pharaoh], lord-mine, [speaking] thus ...." EA 254

Bodies of the letters also repeat the phraseology of "king" or "my lord", sometimes doubly as in letter EA 34, (using be-li, as bêlu), "The pharaoh's reproach answered", by the king of Alashiya.

== See also ==
- LUGAL 'king' or 'ruler'
- NIN – 'queen' or 'priestess'
- Bêlu – 'lord' or 'master'
