= Addaya =

Ancient Egyptian official

Addaya was an Egyptian official during the period of the Amarna letters correspondence (1350–1335 BC) who resided in and was the governor of Gaza. His name is West Semitic indicating he may have been a local Canaanite.

Addaya is referenced in four EA Amarna letters (EA for 'el Amarna'), written to the pharaoh of Egypt during a 15–20 year(?) time period. He is in letter EA 254, no. 3 of 3 by Labaya of Šakmu (Shechem), who was aligned with the Habiru of Canaan, the Habiru being one of the main topics of the entire body of Amarna letters. Addaya is also in three letters by Abdi-Heba of Jerusalem, (called Uru-salim in the Amarna letters – EA 289, URU-Ú-ru-sa-lim, "(City)-Uru-salim").

Addaya seems to have held jurisdiction over Shechem (EA 254) and Jerusalem (EA 289) with Gaza serving as an important administrative base for Egypt at the time, and Pauru is also mentioned as residing there at least some of the time. Abdi-Heba laments that Jerusalem is not accorded the same attention or support by the pharaoh as Gaza is (EA 289).

== Letters for Commissioner: Addaya ==
=== EA 287, title: "A very serious crime" ===
Letter no. 3 of 6 from Abdi-Heba, beginning in the middle of the letter:

"....
"With regard to the Kassites, may the king make inquiry of the commissioners. Though the house is well fortified, they attempted a very serious crime. They [t]ook their tools-(men and materiel), and I had to seek shelter by a support for the roof: ga-ag-gi. A[nd so i]f he is going to send [troop]s into [Urusalim], let them come with [a garrison for] (regular) service. May the king provide for them; [all] of the land might be in dire straits on their account. May the king inquire about the[m. Let there be] much food, much oil, much clothing until Pauru, the commissioner of the king, comes up to Urusalim. Gone is Addaya together with the garrison of soldiers [that] the king [pro]vided. May the king know (that) Addaya [sa]id to me, "Behold, he has dismissed me." Do not abandon it, [and] send this [year] a garrison, and send right here the commissioner of the king. I sent [as gift]s to the king, my lord, [x]–prisoners, 5000– ... [...] [and] 8–porters for the caravans of the k[ing, my lord], but they have been taken in the countryside: ša-de_{4}-e of Ayyaluna. May the king, my lord, know (that) I am unable to send a caravan to the king, my lord. For your information! As the king has placed his name in Urusalim forever, he cannot abandon it—the land of Urusalim.
Say to the scribe of the king, my lord: Message of Abdi-Heba, your servant. I fall at (your) feet. I am your servant. Present eloquent words to the king, my lord: I am a soldier of the king. (I am) –always yours–."
-EA 287, (complete: only lines 33-78(End))

=== EA 254, title: "Neither rebel nor delinquent (2)" ===
Letter no. 3 of 3 from Labayu of Shechem-(Šakmu of the letters).

"To the king-(i.e. pharaoh), my lord and my Sun: Thus Labayu, your servant and the dirt on which you tread. I fall at the feet of the king, my lord and my Sun, 7 times and 7 times. I have obeyed the orders that the king wrote to me. Who am I that the king should lose his land on account of me? The fact is that I am a loyal servant of the king! I am not a rebel and I am not delinquent in duty. I have not held back my payments of tribute; I have not held back anything requested by my commissioner. He denounces me unjustly, but the king, my lord, does not examine my (alleged) act of rebellion. Moreover, my act of rebellion is this: when I entered Gazru, I kept on saying, "Everything of mine the king takes, but where is what belongs to Milkilu-(i.e. king of Magidda)? I know the actions of Milkilu against me! Moreover, the king wrote for my son. I did not know that my son was consorting with the Apiru. I herewith hand him over to Addaya. Moreover, how, if the king wrote to me, "Put a bronze dagger into your heart and die," how could I not execute the order of the king?" -EA 254, lines 1-36 (complete)

== See also ==
- Amarna letters
- Abdi-Heba, mayor of Jerusalim/Uru-salim
- Labaya, mayor of Shechem/(Šakmu)
