= Šuwardata =

King of the Canaanite city of Gath

Šuwardata (Shuwardata, Šuardatu) is understood by most scholars to be the king of the Canaanite city of Gath (Tell es-Safi), although some have suggested that he was the 'mayor' of Qiltu (Keilah?, or Qi'iltu), during the 1350 BC-1335 BC Amarna letters correspondence. Šuwardata was the author of 8 letters to the Egyptian pharaoh.

== Name ==
The name Šuwardata may be of Indo-Aryan origin, perhaps reflecting a compound including the Vedic Sun god Surya and meaning "given by heaven."

== Sample of Šuwardata's letters ==
Besides letters EA 283, and EA 366, (EA for 'el Amarna'), only letter 280 tells of intrigues: See Labaya, or Abdi-Heba, as EA 280 claims: "Moreover, Lab'ayu who used to take our town, is dead, but now [an]other Lab'ayu is 'Abdi-Heba, and he seizes our town."

The other 5 letters do refer to the following: Qeltu-(Qiltu, Keilah:); silver (as mercenary pay); the Sun, (as Rê); the archer-forces; and the only reference to Rahmanu, an Egyptian official, (letter EA 284, "The powerful hand of the king").

=== EA 283: "Oh to see the king"--(no. 6 of 8) ===
All Šuwardata's letters are addressed to the pharaoh.

To the king, my lord, my god, my Sun: Message of Šuwardata, your servant. I fall at the feet of the king, my lord. I fall at the feet of the king, my lord, 7 times and 7 times more (i.e. 'overflowing'-(mīlu)). The king, my lord, has written me, "Enter and pay me homage." Into the presence of the king, my lord! Would that it were possible to enter into the presence of the king, my lord, to receive the ... and the .... of the king, my lord. Since Yanhamu is with you, speak with him. If there are still no archers available, then may the king, my lord, take me away. May the king, my lord, be informed that 30–cities have waged war against me. I am alone! The war against me is severe. The king, my lord, has cast me from his hand. May the king, my lord, send archers. May the king, my lord, ta(k)e me away. Since Yanhamu, that is, the commissioner of the king, my lord, is there, may the king, my lord, spea[k] with him, (asking), "Is the war against Šuwardata severe, –or is it not?" -EA 283, lines 1-33 (complete)

Šuwardata must have been an important regional individual, since he claims 30 cities, sub-cities, or city-states have been warring with his city.

=== EA 366: "A rescue operation"--(no. 8 of 8) ===
"Say to the king, my lord, my Sun, my god: Message of Šuwardata, your servant, the servant of the king and the dirt at your feet, the ground you tread on. I prostrate myself at the feet of the king, my lord, the Sun from the sky (i.e. 'heaven:' ša-me ), 7 times and 7 times, both on the stomach and on the back. May the king, my lord, be informed that the 'Apiru that rose up: na-aš-ša-a [נשא] against the lands, the god of the king, my lord, gave to me–and I smote him. And may the king, my lord, be informed that all my brothers have abandoned me. Only Abdi-Heba and I have been at war with (that) 'Apiru. Surata, the ruler of Akka, and Endaruta, the ruler of Akšapa, (these) two also have come to my aid: na-az-a-qú [נזעקו] (have been summoned to help) with 50–chariots, and now they are on my side in the war. So may it seem right in the sight of the king, my lord, and may he send Yanhamu so that we may all wage war and you restore the land of the king, my lord, to its borders: up-sí-hi. [אפסי] ((i.e. 'up-si-hi='borders' referring to article: Upu, also of the "Amarna letters"-?, putting Shuwardata's location on the perimeter?)) -EA 366, lines 1-34 (complete)

== List of letters ==
1. EA 278—title: "As ordered (4)"
2. EA 279—title: "A wasteland"
3. EA 280—title: "Lab'ayu redivivus"
4. EA 281—title: "Rebellion"
5. EA 282—title: "Alone"
6. EA 283—title: "Oh! to see the king.
7. EA 284—title: "The powerful hand of the king"

and from the later corpus:

1. EA 366—title: "A rescue operation"

== See also ==
- Labaya
- Abdi-Heba, mayor of Uru-salim-Jerusalem
- Upu - (reference from letter EA 366 ?-(borders))
