= Henri Cazelles =

- Born: 8 June 1912; 8th arrondissement of Paris
- Died: 10 January 2009 (aged 96); 14th arrondissement of Paris
- Education: doctorate
- Occupation: Biblical scholar, writer, editing staff, translator, university teacher
- Employer: Catholic University of Paris; École pratique des hautes études

Henri Cazelles (born on 8 June 1912 and died on 10 January 2009 in Paris) was a French exegete, priest of Saint-Sulpice, doctor of theology, licentiate in Sacred Scripture, doctor of law, graduate of the École libre des sciences politiques, doctor honoris causa of the University of Bonn, member of the Egyptian Society, former secretary of the Pontifical Biblical Commission, former director of studies at the EPHE, associate member of the Royal Academy of Belgium, EBU Theology and Religious Sciences. He was the nephew of Louis Massignon.

He is famous for having edited the Supplément au Dictionnaire de la Bible.

== Education ==
Cazelles become in Doctor with the thesis entitled Église et état en Allemagne de Weimar aux premières années du IIIe reich (1936) at the University of Paris.

== Award ==
- Doctor honoris causa at the University of Bonn

== Bibliography ==
=== Books ===
- Etudes sur le Code de l'alliance. Paris: Letouzey et Ané. 1946. LCCN a47005510.
- La Naissance de l'Église, secte juive rejetée?. Collection Lire la Bible. Cerf. 1968.
- Écriture, parole et esprit. Trois aspects de l'herméneutique biblique. Desclée De Brouwer. 1971.
- À la recherche de Moïse. Collection: Études Annexes. Éditions du Cerf. 1979. ISBN 2-204-01290-4.
  - translated into Italian: Alla Ricerca Di Mosè. Queriniana. 1982.
- Naissance de l'Église. Collection: Lire la Bible (2 ed.). Le Cerf. 1983-11-01. ISBN 2-204-02103-2.
- Autour de l'Exode. Collection: Sources bibliques. Gabalda. 1987. ISBN 2-85021-024-2.
- Histoire politique d'Israël. Des origines à Alexandre le Grand. Cerf. 1989. ISBN 2-7189-0218-3.
- Le Messie de la Bible. Christologie de l'Ancien Testament. Collection Jésus et Jésus-Christ. Desclée. 1995. ISBN 2-7189-0651-0.
- La Bible et son Dieu. Collection Jésus et Jésus-Christ. Desclée. 1999. ISBN 2-7189-0949-8.
