= Pa (cuneiform) =

Cuneiform sign

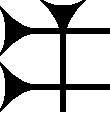
Cuneiform sign for pa.

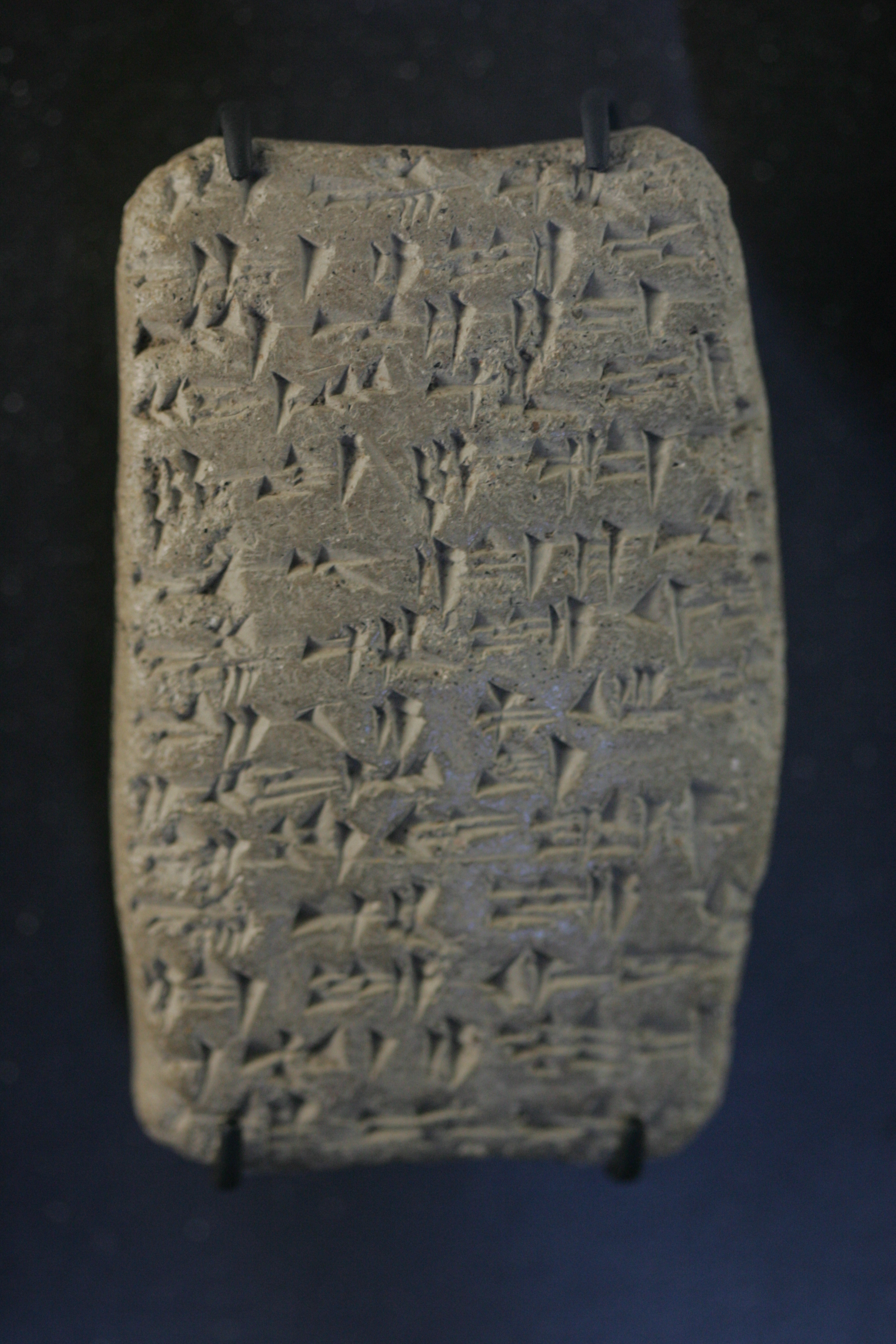
Amarna letter EA 364-(obverse), Ayyab to Pharaoh, "Justified War". Usage in Line 8, 4th character; text reads left-to-right. (very high resolution, expandible photo)

The cuneiform pa sign, (as Sumerogram, PA), has many uses in both the 14th century BC Amarna letters and the Epic of Gilgamesh. It is routinely and commonly used to spell the Akkadian language word "pānu", face, presence, and with a preposition (ex. ana pānu), before. In the photo of the obverse of EA 364, it is used to spell Akkadian "eperu", 'dust', (EA 364, lines 7,8: "...and (ù dust (IŠ (Sumerogram)=dust)) and (u)\ dust "-(a-pa-ru). (The two "and"-s are u-(no. 3), then u-(no. 1)-(u (cuneiform))(the bottom half).)

The alphabetic/syllabic uses and Sumerograms of the 'pa' sign from the Epic of Gilgamesh:

hat
pa
PA (Sumerogram)s
SÀG

Its usage numbers from the Epic of Gilgamesh are as follows: hat-(21), pa-(209), PA-(11), SÀG-(1). In the Amarna letters the start of "messenger Xxxxx" is often spelled in cuneiform characters: "LÚ.PA.X.y.z" (etc.), (LÚ the beginning determinative for Man).
