= Tagi of Ginti =

Ruler of Ginti

Tagi (fl. c. 1350 BC) was the ruler or mayor of ancient Ginti–(Gintikirmil), of the 14th century BC Amarna letters. Tagi's name is a Hurrian hypocoristicon for the word beautiful.

Tagi was the father-in-law of Milkilu, mayor, governor, or ruler of ancient Gazru-(modern Gezer), (one of three mayors). Tagi was the author of 3 short, but complete Amarna letters, EA 264-66, (EA for 'el Amarna'), and Tagi is also referenced in two other letters. The authored letters are written to the pharaoh of Egypt.

== The 3 letters of Tagi ==
=== EA 264: "The ubiquitous king"-(Caravans) ===
To the king, m[y] lord: Message of Tagi, you[r] servant. I fall at the feet of the king, my lord, 7 times and 7 times. As I am the servant of the king, I tried to assemble a caravan, with my brother in charge, but he barely escaped being killed. He is unable to send my caravan to the king, my lord. Ask your commissioner if my brother did not barely escape being killed. Moreover, as far as we are concerned, it is to you that my eyes (are directed). Should we go up into the sky: (ša-me-ma), or should we go down into the netherworld, our head: (ru-šu-nu), is in your hand. So now I try herewith to send my caravan to the king, my lord, with a partner of mine in charge. May the king, my lord, be informed that I serve the king and am on my guard. —EA 264, lines 1-25 (complete)

=== EA 265: "A gift acknowledged" ===
Letter two of three letters by Tagi of Ginti, (Gintikirmil).

To the king, my lord: Message of Tagi, your servant. I fall at the feet of the king, my lord. My own man I sent along with [ ... ] to see the face of the king, my lord. [And] the king, my lord, [s]ent a present to me in the care of Tahmaya, and Tahmaya gave (me) a gold goblet and 1[2 se]ts of linen garments. For the information [of the kin]g, my lord. —EA 265, lines 1-15 (~complete)

=== EA 266: "And there was light" ===
Besides the prostration formula phrasing, letter no. 266 contains two phrases referring to the pharaoh. See: Phrases and Quotations

[S]ay [to] the king, [my] lo[rd], my [g]od, my {Sun]: Message of Tag[i, your servant], the dirt at [your] fe[et]. I fall] at the feet of the king, [my] lor[d], my god, my Sun, 7 times and 7 times. I looked [th]is way, and I l[oo]ked [th]at way, and there was no [li]ght. Then I looked [to]wards the king, [my lord, and the]re was light. I am [ind]eed deter[min]ed to serve the king, my lord. A brick many move fro[m u]nder [its] par[tner]-("partner brick"); still I will not move from [un]der the feet [of the k]ing, my lord. I herewith se[nd] [ha]rness(es) [for a pa]ir of hor[ses, and] a bow, and [a qu]ive[r], [a s]pea[r, c]over[rs, t]o the king, [my] l[ord]. —EA 266, lines 1-33 (complete, with damaged cuneiform–characters, (or missing))

== See also ==
- Amarna letters–phrases and quotations
- Tahmaya, a commissioner
