= Abdi-Heba =

Chieftain of Jerusalem during the Late Bronze Age

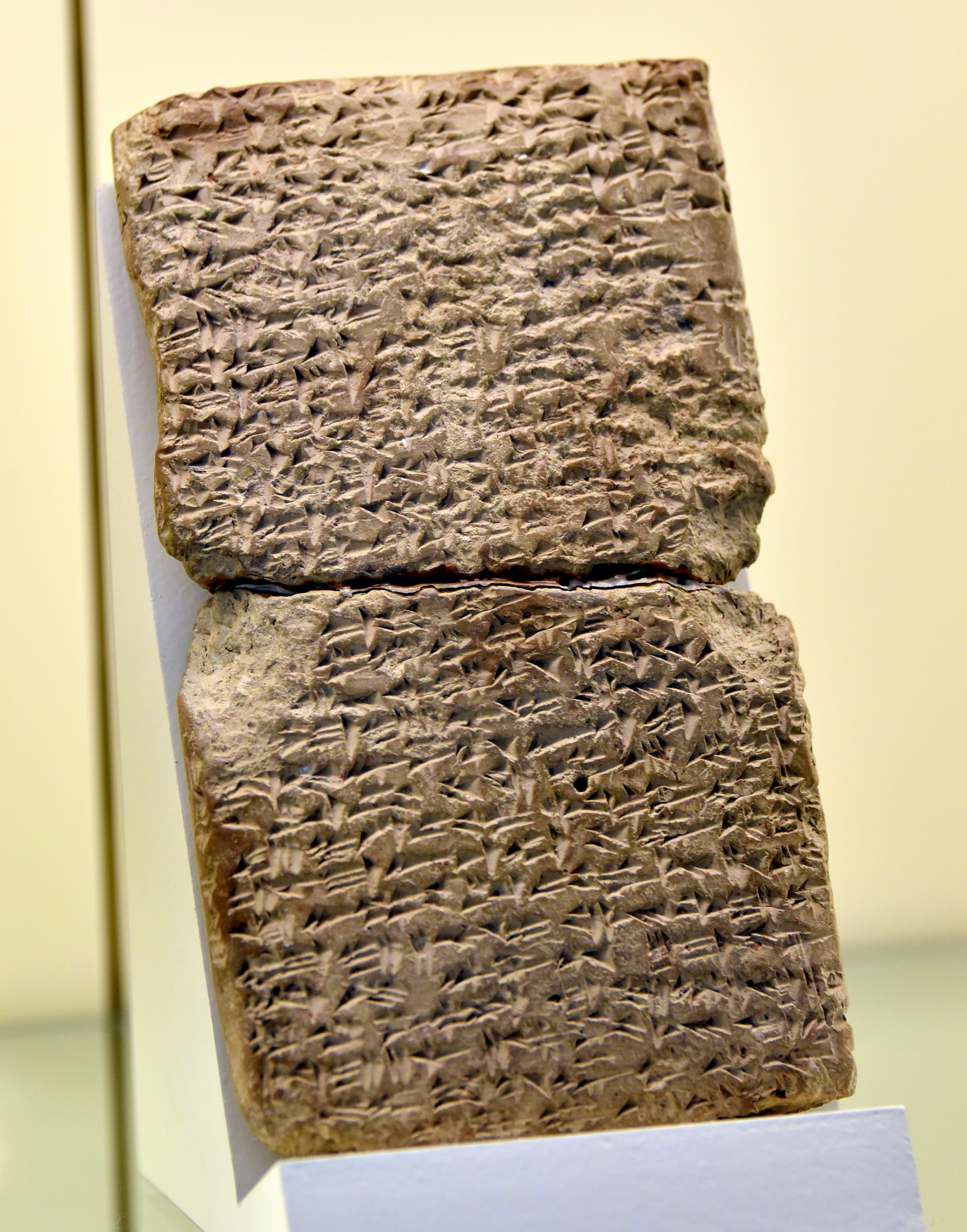
One of the Amarna letters. A letter from Abdi-Ḫeba of Jerusalem to the Egyptian Pharaoh Amenhotep III. 1st half of the 14th century BC. From Tell el-Amarna, Egypt. Vorderasiatisches Museum, Berlin.

Abdi-Ḫeba (Abdi-Kheba, Abdi-Ḫepat, or Abdi-Ḫebat; fl. c. 1335 BC) was a local chieftain of Jerusalem during the Amarna period. Egyptian documents have him deny he was a mayor (ḫazānu) and assert he is a soldier (we'w), the implication being he was the son of a local chief sent to Egypt to receive military training there.

Also unknown is whether he was part of a dynasty that governed Jerusalem or whether he was put on the throne by the Egyptians. Abdi-Heba himself notes that he holds his position not through his parental lineage but by the grace of Pharaoh, but this might be flattery rather than an accurate representation of the situation. At this time the area he administered from his garrison may have had a population of 1,500 people and Jerusalem would have been a 'small highlands stronghold' in the 14th century BC with no fortifications or large buildings. The king is associated with the oldest written texts from Jerusalem, where the Akkadian used had Canaanite language forms.

== Origin ==
Abdi-Ḫeba's name can be translated as "servant of Ḫebat", a Hurrian goddess. Whether Abdi-Ḫeba was himself of Hurrian descent is unknown. There is a mix of Canaanite and Hurrian influences (cf. Mitanni Empire) in this region.

== Correspondence with Egypt ==
During Abdi-Ḫeba's reign the region was under attack from marauding bands of Habiru. He made frequent pleas to the Pharaoh of Egypt, for an army or, at least, an officer to command. He also made other requests for military aid in fighting off his enemies, both Canaanite warlords and bands of Apiru:

Say to the king, my lord: Message of Abdi-Heba, your servant. I fall at the feet of my lord 7 times and 7 times. Consider the entire affair. Milkilu and Tagi brought troops into Qiltu against me… May the king know (that) all the lands are at peace (with one another), but I am at war. May the king provide for his land. Consider the lands of Gazru, Ašqaluna, and Lakisi. They have given them [my enemies] food, oil and any other requirement. So may the king provide for archers and send the archers against men that commit crimes against the king, my lord. If this year there are archers, then the lands and the hazzanu (client kings) will belong to the king, my lord. But if there are no archers, then the king will have neither lands nor hazzanu. Consider Jerusalem! This neither my father nor my mother gave to me. The strong hand (arm) of the king gave it to me. Consider the deed! This is the deed of Milkilu and the deed of the sons of Lab'ayu, who have given the land of the king to the 'Apiru. Consider, O king, my lord! I am in the right!… EA 287.

As a result, conspiracy charges are made against Abdi-Ḫeba, who defended himself strenuously in his correspondence with the Pharaoh.

Abdi-Ḫeba's ultimate fate is unknown.

== Letters (6) from Abdi-Ḫeba's to the King of Egypt ==
Abdi-Ḫeba was the author of letters EA 285–290.

1. EA 285—title: "The soldier-ruler of Jerusalem"
2. EA 286—title: "A throne granted, not inherited"
3. EA 287—title: "A very serious crime"
4. EA 288—title: "Benign neglect"
5. EA 289—title: "A reckoning demanded"
6. EA 290—title: "Three against one"

== Letters mentioning Abdi-Heba ==
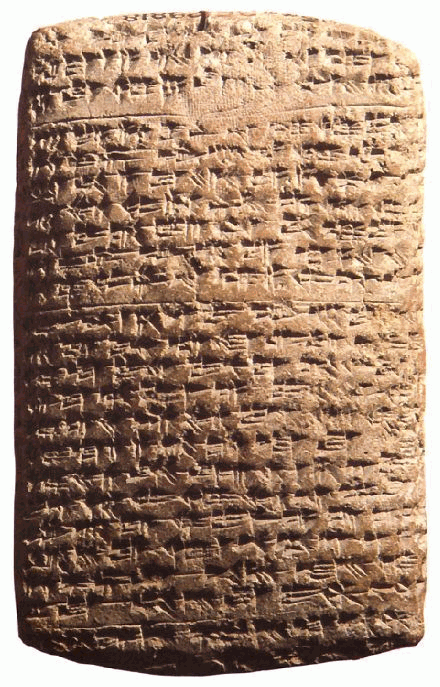
Amarna letter EA 161 by Aziru, leader of Amurru, stating his case to the pharaoh

=== Gath ===
EA 366 by Shuwardata to the King of Egypt. He states he defeated the Habiru. All his brothers (equals) had abandoned him, so that only he and Abdi-Heba were hostile to the Habiru. Surata of Akko and Intaruta of Aksapa, came to assist Suwardata with 50 chariots. He asked for the commissioner Yanḥamu.

EA 280 by Shuwardata to the King of Egypt. Šuwardata states that he with the king's permission had retaken Keilah. But Abdi-Heba had sent a message to the Men of Qiltu to follow him. Thus, the city had been captured again. Lab'aya is reported as dead, but Abdi-Heba is considered as a new Lab'aya by Suwardata for capturing his cities. EA 280 should be later than EA 366, when both of them were fighting the Habiru.

Say to the king, my lord, my god, my Sun: Message of Shuwardata, your servant, the dirt at your feet. I fall at the feet of the king, my lord, my god, my Sun, 7 times and 7 times. The king, my lord, permitted me to wage war against Qeltu (Keilah). I waged war. It is now at peace with me; my city is restored to me. Why did Abdi-Heba write to the men of Qeltu, "Accept silver and follow me?"… Moreover, Labaya, who used to take our towns, is dead, but now another Labaya is Abdi-Heba, and he seizes our town. So, may the king take cognizance of his servant because of this deed… EA 280.

== Resources ==
=== Sources ===
Translations adapted from

- Moran, William (ed. and trans.) The Amarna Letters. Baltimore: Johns Hopkins Univ. Press, 1992.

=== Other works ===
- Baikie, James. The Amarna Age: A Study of the Crisis of the Ancient World. University Press of the Pacific, 2004.
- Cohen, Raymond and Raymond Westbrook (eds.). Amarna Diplomacy: The Beginnings of International Relations. Johns Hopkins University Press, 2002.
