= Keilah =

Biblical settlement

Keilah Arabic: قيلة Hebrew: קעילה
- Village
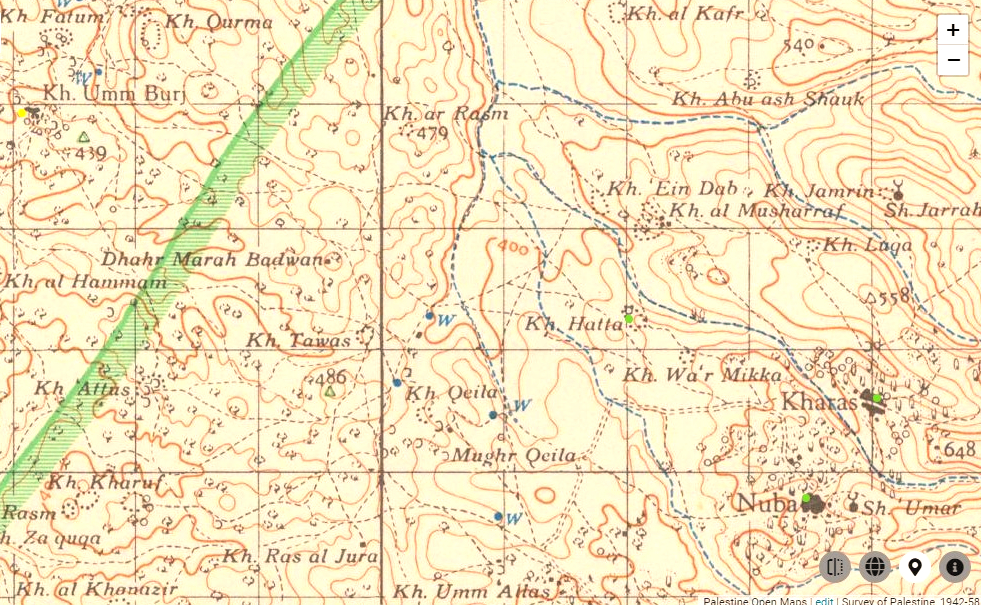
- Old map showing ruin of Keilah (Kh. Qeila) in relation to Green Line

- Location of Keilah
- Coordinates: 31°36′58″N 35°00′11″E
- Grid position: 150113 PAL
- Region: West Bank
- District: Judea and Samaria Area

Government
  - Council: Har Hevron (Mount Hebron) Regional Council

Population (2006)
  - Total: 918
- Time zone: UTC+2 (IST)
  - Summer (DST): UTC+3 (IDT)

Keilah (Hebrew: קְעִילָה, romanized: Qəʿilā, lit. 'Citadel') was a city in the lowlands of the Kingdom of Judah. It is now a ruin known as Khirbet Qeyla near the modern village of Qila, Hebron, 7 miles (11 km) east of Bayt Jibrin and about 3 kilometres (1.9 mi) west of Kharas.

== History ==
=== Late Bronze ===
The earliest historical record of Keilah is found in the Amarna letters from the 14th century BCE. In some of them, Qeilah and her king Šuwardata are mentioned. It is possible to infer from them the importance of this city among the cities of Canaan that bordered near Egypt before the conquest of Canaan by the Israelites.

=== Iron Age ===
According to the Hebrew Bible in the First Book of Samuel, the Philistines had made an inroad eastward as far as Keilah and had begun to appropriate the country for themselves by plundering its granaries until David prevented them. Later, upon inquiry, he learnt that the inhabitants of the town, his native countrymen, would prove unfaithful to him, in that they would deliver him up to King Saul, at which time he and his 600 men "departed from Keilah, and went whithersoever they could go”. They fled to the woods at Ziph. "And David was in the wilderness of Ziph, in a wood" (1 Samuel 23:15). Here his friend Jonathan sought him out "and strengthened his hand in God": this was the last meeting between David and Jonathan.

Keilah is mentioned in the Book of Joshua (15:44) as one of the cities of the Shephelah "Lowland". Benjamin of Tudela identified Qaqun as ancient Keilah in 1160. Conder and Kitchener, however, identified the biblical site with Khirbet Qeyla "seven English-miles from Bayt Jibrin" and 11 km (7 mi) northwest of Hebron. The site was earlier described by Eusebius in his Onomasticon as being "[nearly] eight milestones east of Eleutheropolis [now Bayt Jibrin], on the road to Hebron." Victor Guérin, who visited Palestine between the years 1852–1888, also identified Keilah with the same ruin, Khirbet Kila (Arabic: خربة كيلا), near the modern village by that name, a place situated a few kilometres south of Adullam (Khurbet esh Sheikh Madhkur) and west of Kharas. This view has been adopted by the Israel Antiquities Authority. Khirbet Qeyla, lies on the north side of the village of Qila. Guérin found here a subterranean and circular vault, apparently ancient; the vestiges of a wall surrounding the plateau, and on the side of a neighboring hill, tombs cut in the rock face. The town is mentioned in the Amarna letters as Qilta.

=== Second Temple period ===
Keilah is mentioned in the Book of Nehemiah as one of the towns resettled by the Jewish exiles returning from the Babylonian captivity and who helped to construct the walls of Jerusalem during the reign of the Persian king Artaxerxes I. Nehemiah further records that those returnees were the very descendants of the people who had formerly resided in the town before their banishment from the country, who had all returned to live in their former places of residence.

During the Second Temple period, fig-cake shaped into round or square-shaped hard cakes (Hebrew: דְּבֵילָה, romanized: dəḇilā) were produced in Qeyla, and because of their outstanding and succulent quality and sweetness were permitted to be offered as such in the Temple in Jerusalem as first-fruits, a thing customarily reserved only for fresh fruits (when brought from places near Jerusalem), and for raisins and dried figs when brought from distant places. This is mentioned in the Jerusalem Talmud in the tractate Bikkurim 3:3, and Solomon Sirilio's commentary there.

The town's present residents are Bedouins expelled during 1948 Arab–Israeli War from areas around Beersheba.

== Description of ruin ==
Khirbet Qeila (Ruin of Keilah) is situated on a terraced, dome-shaped hill at the end of a spur that descends to the east, adjacent to a small Arab village which bears the same name. On the other side, it is surrounded by channels, which descend into the watercourse of Wadi es-Sur (an extension of the Elah Valley) and fortify it with a natural fortification. Its area is about 50 dunams (12.3 acres). Remains of walls can be seen on its slopes, and in the north is seen the ascent to the city gate, which is made like a ramp with a retaining wall. At the foot of the tell, on the side of the road, burial caves were hewn. The pottery finds at the tell indicate that it had an almost continuous settlement from the Bronze Age to the Crusader and Mamluk periods.

The remnants of an old road leading from Keilah to the Elah Valley via Adullam can still be seen, and from Keilah to Tarqumiyah. Another ancient road breaks off from Keilah in the direction of Kefar Bish, now a ruin 4.5 kilometres (2.8 mi) to the west of Keilah, but once a Jewish village settled during the Roman occupation of Palestine.

== Bibliography ==
- Amit, David (n.d.). "Keilah (Qila)". In Ben-Yosef, Sefi (ed.). Israel Guide - Judaea (A useful encyclopedia for the knowledge of the country) (in Hebrew). Vol. 9. Jerusalem: Keter Publishing House, in affiliation with the Israel Ministry of Defence. OCLC 745203905.
- Avi-Yonah, M. (1976). "Gazetteer of Roman Palestine". Qedem. 5. The Institute of Archaeology at the Hebrew University of Jerusalem; Carta: 3–112. JSTOR 43587090.
- Chapmann III, R.L.; Taylor, J.E., eds. (2003). Palestine in the Fourth Century A.D.: The Onomasticon by Eusebius of Caesarea. Translated by G.S.P. Freeman-Grenville. Jerusalem: Carta. ISBN 965-220-500-1. OCLC 937002750.
- Conder, C.R. (2002). Tent Work in Palestine: A Record of Discovery and Adventure. Adamant Media Corporation. ISBN 978-1-4021-8987-6.
- Conder, C.R.; Kitchener, H.H. (1883). The Survey of Western Palestine: Memoirs of the Topography, Orography, Hydrography, and Archaeology. Vol. 3. London: Committee of the Palestine Exploration Fund.
- Guérin, V. (1869). Description Géographique Historique et Archéologique de la Palestine (in French). Vol. 1: Judee, pt. 3. Paris: L'Imprimerie Nationale.
- Josephus (1981). Josephus Complete Works. Translated by William Whiston. Grand Rapids, Michigan: Kregel Publications. ISBN 0-8254-2951-X.
- Rainey, A.F. (1983). "The Biblical Shephelah of Judah". Bulletin of the American Schools of Oriental Research. 251 (251). The University of Chicago Press on behalf of The American Schools of Oriental Research: 1–22. doi:10.2307/1356823. JSTOR 1356823.
- Tsumura, David Toshio (2007). The First Book of Samuel. Grand Rapids, Michigan: NICOT; Grand Rapids: Eerdmans. ISBN 9780802823595. OCLC 918498742. (reprinted in 2009)
