= Prostration formula =

In Amarna letters, phrases of servility

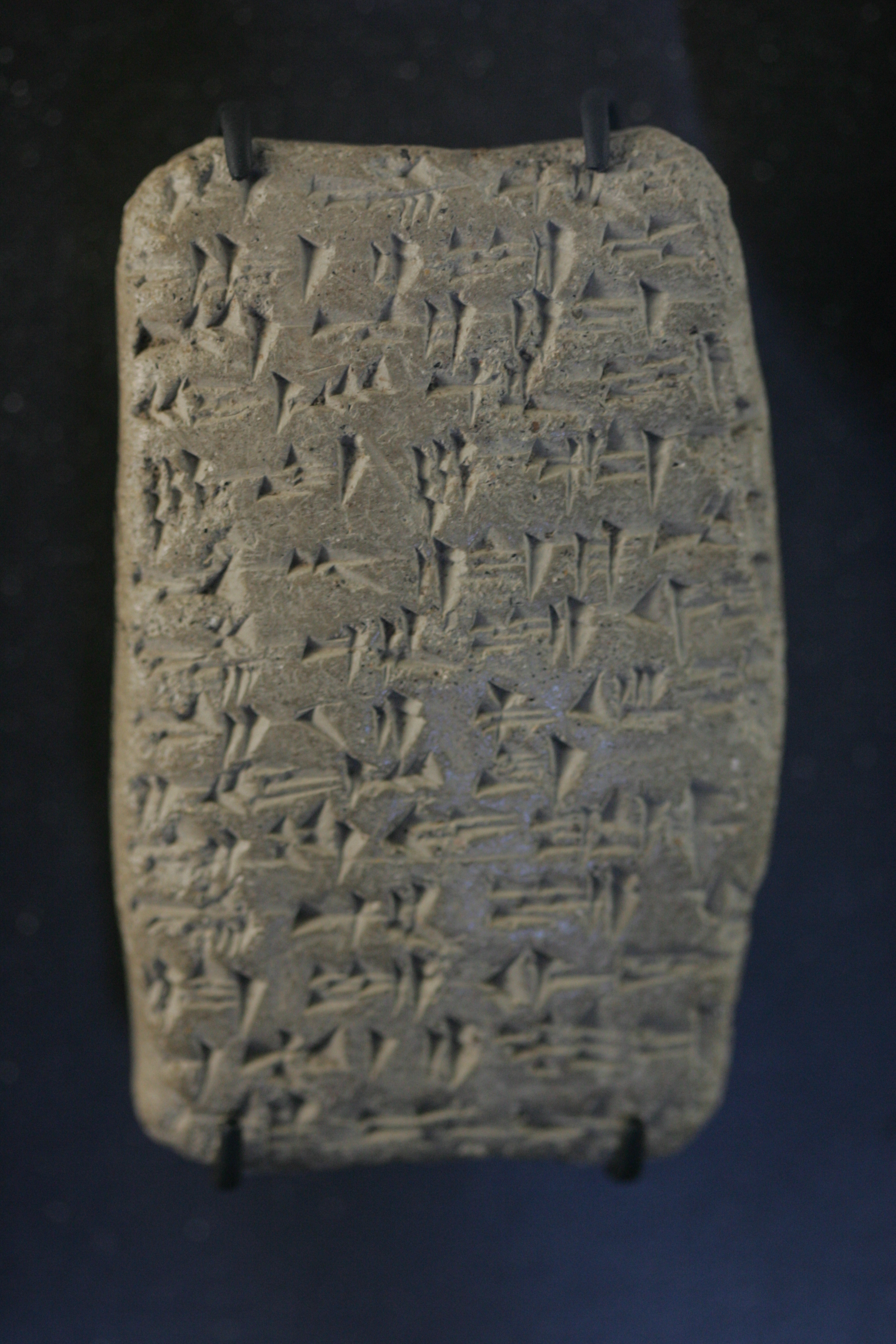
Amarna letter EA 364, "Justified War", City-state-ruler Ayyab of Ashartu to Pharaoh. Line 5, "7 times (and) and 7 times...", (7-šu 7-ta-an, (5 cuneiform characters)), "I bow down" (line 6: 2 signs: am-qut).

In the 1350 BC correspondence of 382 letters, called the Amarna letters, the prostration formula is usually the opening subservient remarks to the addressee, the Egyptian pharaoh. The formula is based on prostration, namely reverence and submissiveness. Often the letters are from vassal rulers or vassal city-states, especially in Canaan but also in other localities.

The formula is often repetitive, or multi-part, with parts seeming to repeat and can go forward in a typical standard format. However, the prostration formula may also be duplicated in a similar format at the end of a letter, or a foreshortened part of the formula may be entered, for effect, in the middle of a letter.

== Some example letters with the Prostration formula ==
The letters EA 242 and 246 are from Biridiya of Magidda-(Megiddo), (EA for 'el Amarna').

=== Biridiya letter 242, no. 1 of 7: title: "Request granted" ===
Say to the king-(i.e. pharaoh), my lord and my Sun: Message-('um–ma') of Biridiya, the ruler of Magidda, the loyal servant of the king. I prostrate myself at the feet of the king, my lord and my Sun, 7 times and 7 times. I herewith give what the king, my lord, requested: 30 oxen, [x sheep and Goats, x bi]rds [ ... ] ... [ ...And in]deed, [the ...] ... of the [l]and are at peace, but I am at war. —EA 242, lines 1-17 (complete, but with lacunae)

See: Amarna letters for the phrase "7 times and 7 times".

=== Biridiya letter 246, no. 5 of 7: title: "The sons of Lab'ayu" ===
Say to the king, my lord and my Sun: Message of Biridiya, your loyal servant. I fall at the feet of the king, m[y] lord and my Sun, 7 times and 7 times.
I have heard the mes[sage] o[f] the ki[ng ...] .... (lacuna)

Reverse:

and [ ... ], and indee[d ...] you ar[e ...]. May the king, my lord, know. The two sons of Lab'ayu have indeed gi[v]en their money to the 'Apiru and the Suteans in ord]er to w[age war again]st me. [May] the king [take cognizance] of [his servant]. —EA 246, 1-9, reverse 1-11 (complete, but with lacunae)

== An example of: "Dirt, Ground, Chair, and Footstool" ==
=== Biryawaza letter EA 195, no. 2 of 4: title: "Waiting for the Pharaoh's words" ===
This letter contains all the uses of "dirt, ground, chair, and footstool", seldom found in one letter.

Say to the king, my lord: Message of Biryawaza, your servant, the dirt at your feet, and the ground you tread on, the chair you sit on and the footstool at your feet. I fall at the feet of the king, my lord, the Sun of the dawn (over): li-me-ma (peoples), 7 times plus 7 times. My lord is the Sun in the sky, and like the coming forth of the Sun in the sky (your) servants await the coming forth of the words from the mouth of their lord. I am indeed, together with my troops and chariots, together with my brothers, my 'Apiru and my Suteans, at the disposition of the archers, wheresoever the king, my lord, shall order--(order me to go). —EA 195, lines 1-32 (complete)

== See also ==
- Amarna letters
- Amarna letters–phrases and quotations
