= Bureau of Correspondence of Pharaoh =

Ancient Egyptian administration building

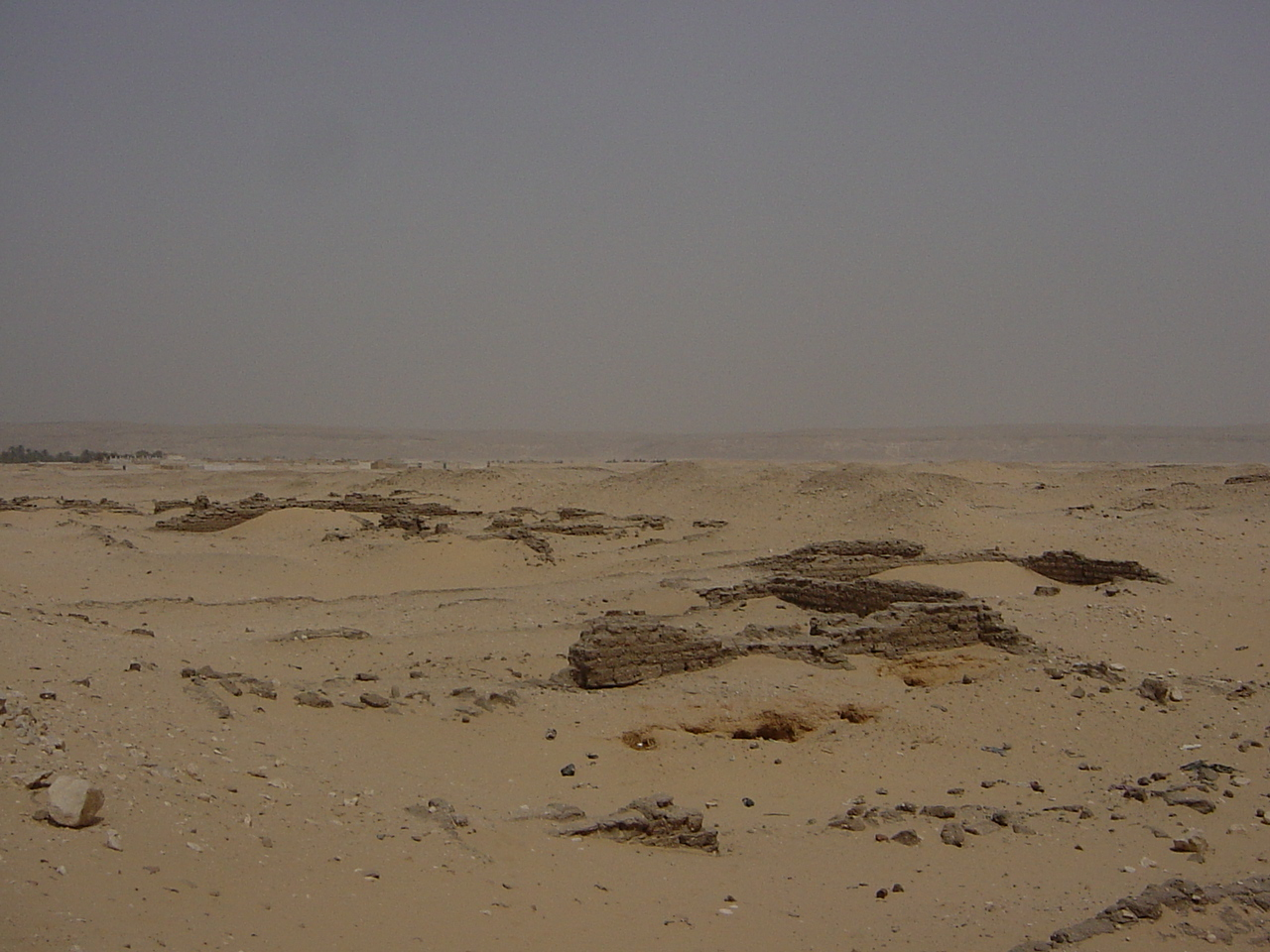
Bureau of Correspondence of Pharaoh at Amarna

The building known as the Bureau of Correspondence of Pharaoh (also known as the Records Office) is located in the 'Central City' area of the ancient Egyptian city of Akhetaten, known as Amarna in modern times. The city was the short-lived capital during the reign of the pharaoh Akhenaten during ancient Egypt's 18th Dynasty.

== History ==
The actual building (although the name may refer to a larger complex of buildings) is located behind the buildings known as the 'King's House' and the Small Aten Temple, and is now ruined, and it appears to be where local villagers discovered a deposit of tablets, now known as the Amarna letters around the year 1888. The building included bricks stamped with the words "Bureau of Correspondence of Pharaoh".
