= Milkilu =

Mayor/ruler of Gazru (Gezer)

Milki-ilu (Milkilu, Milk-ilu, Ili-Milku; fl. c. 1350 BC), was the mayor, governor, or ruler of the Land of Gazru (Gezer) around 1350 BC. He is known as the son-in-law of Tagi and cooperating with Labaya during a period of turmoil among the vassals of Egypt. He is accused of being a rebel, employing mercenaries from the Habiru men (^{lu2-meš} ḫa-bi-ri).

He is known from several letter in that Amarna Archive. There is one letter from the Pharaoh of Egypt to Milki-ilu (EA 369), there are five letters from Milki-ilu to the King of Egypt (EA 267-271), and several letters from other mayors mentioning Milki-ilu.

He is one of several known mayors of Gezer. Adda-danu and Yapahu were also mayors of Gezer.

The Amarna Period was characterized by the heretic pharaoh Amenhotep IV, succeeded by Tutankhamen. Canaan consisted of smaller city-states and vassals of Egypt. At the same time, Suppiluliuma I of Hatti attacked Tushratta of Mitanni for control over Syria.

== From Egypt ==
=== EA 369 from the Pharaoh of Egypt to Milki-ilu of Gezer ===
In this letter the Pharaoh of Egypt addresses his vassal as ^{m}mil-ki-li LU₂ ^{uru}gaz-ri, meaning "Milki-'ilu, Man of Gezer" - with LU "Man" being a rank below LUGAL "Great Man; King" and LUGAL.GAL (Great King). It is often translated as "ruler, mayor, governor" of a land dominated by a city (Land of Gezer, City of Gezer).

"To Milkilu, the ruler of Gazru: Thus the king. He herewith dispatches to you this tablet (i.e., tablet-letter), saying to you, He herewith sends to you Hanya, the stable (overseer) of the archers, along with everything for the acquisition of beautiful female cupbearers: silver, gold, linen garments: ma-al-ba-ši, carnelian, all sorts of (precious) stones, an ebony chair; all alike, fine things. Total (value): 160 diban. Total: 40 female cupbearers, 40 (shekels of) silver being the price of a female cupbearer. Send extremely beautiful female cupbearers in whom there is no defect (i.e., no guile in their heart), so the king, your lord, will say to you, "this is excellent, in accordance with the order he sent to you." And know that the king is hale like the Sun. For his troops, his ch[ariot]s, his horses, all goes very well. Aman has indeed put the Upper Land, the Lower Land, where the sun rises, where the sun sets, under the feet of the king." —EA 369, lines 1–32 (complete)

The name of the king is not mentioned. The reference to the god Amun argues against the reign of Akhenaten who removed Amun in favor of Aten. Amun was restored by Tutankhamun, into which reign the Great Syrian Wars (c. 1350-1345 BC) of Suppiluliuma I eventually falls.

== From Milki-ilu of Gezer to the king of Egypt ==
=== EA 267, title: "Safe and sound" ===
"[Sa]y [t]o the king, my lord, my [g]od, my Sun: Message of Milkilu, your servant, the dirt at your feet. I fall at the feet of the king, my lord, my god, my Sun, 7 times and 7 times. The order the king, my lord, my god, my Sun, dispatched to me—I am indeed carrying out for the king, my lord, the Sun from the sky. May the king, my lord, my god, my Sun, know that the place of the king, my lord where I am is safe and sound." —EA 267, lines 1–20 (complete)

=== EA 268, title: "A consignment of personnel" ===
"Say [to] the ki[n]g, my [l]ord, [m]y g[o]d, my [S]un: Message of Milkilu, your servant, the [d]i[r]t at your feet. I fall at the feet of the king, my lord, my god, my Sun, 7 times and 7 times. May the k[ing], my [lor]d, know that [the city of the king, my lord], that [he put] i[n my] ch[arge], is safe and sound, [and] the word ... [...] [I sen]d [in the care o]f Hay[a] 46 female ... [...] and 5 male ... [...] and 5 ašīrūma to the king, my lord." —EA 268, lines 1–20, (complete, but with lacunae)

=== EA 269, title: "Archers and myrrh" ===
EA 269 – see: Pítati

=== EA 270, title: "Extortion" ===
Amarna Letter EA 270 See Yanhamu

=== EA 271, title "The power of the 'Apiru" ===
Amarna Letter EA 271 See Yanhamu

== Other letters mentioning Milki-ilu of Gezer ==
=== Jerusalem ===
EA 286 by Abdi-Heba of Jerusalem

EA 287 The ruler of Jerusalem (Ir3-hebat) states that Milki-ili had given bows and bronze arrows to Tagi and the sons of Labaya. Furthermore, Gezer, Ashkelon, and Lachish had given help to them and the Habiru men. It also mentions Piwuru, the King's Commissioner stationed at Gaza.

EA 289 EA 290

=== Rahabu ===
EA 249 makes it clear that Milki-ili was the son-in-law of Tagi (known from Amarna Letters sent from Ginti-Kirmil (EA 264, EA 264, EA 266), Jerusalem (EA 287, EA 289), Rahabu (EA 249, EA 263)).

EA 250

=== Labaya of Shechem ===
EA 254

== See also ==
- Yapahu, Gazru mayor
- Adda-danu, Gazru mayor
- Amarna letters
- Endaruta, note on phrasing: "The king is Hale like the Sun, etc."
