= 1350s BC =

The 1350s BC is a decade that lasted from 1359 BC to 1350 BC.

== Events and trends ==
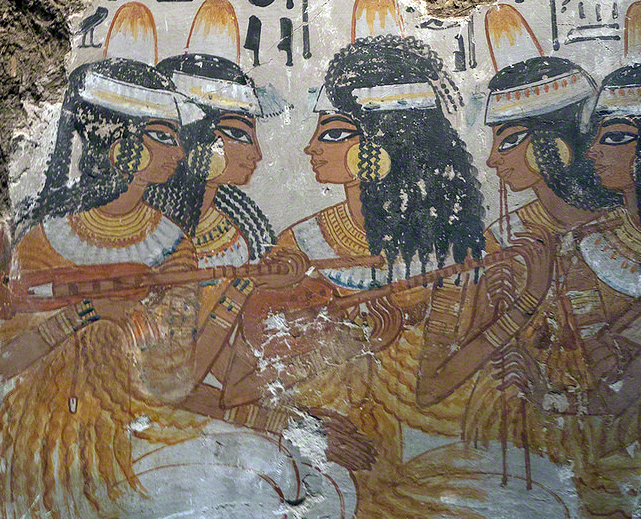
A tomb painting depicting musicians, painted in Thebes, Egypt approximately 1350 BC

- c. 1352 BC – Amenhotep III (Eighteenth Dynasty of Egypt) dies and is succeeded as Pharaoh by Amenhotep IV.
- 1350 BC – Yin becomes the new capital of Shang dynasty China.
