= Labaya =

14th-century BCE prince and ruler in the central hill country of southern Canaan

King of Shechem
- Reign: c. 1350 BC
- Issue: Mutbaal

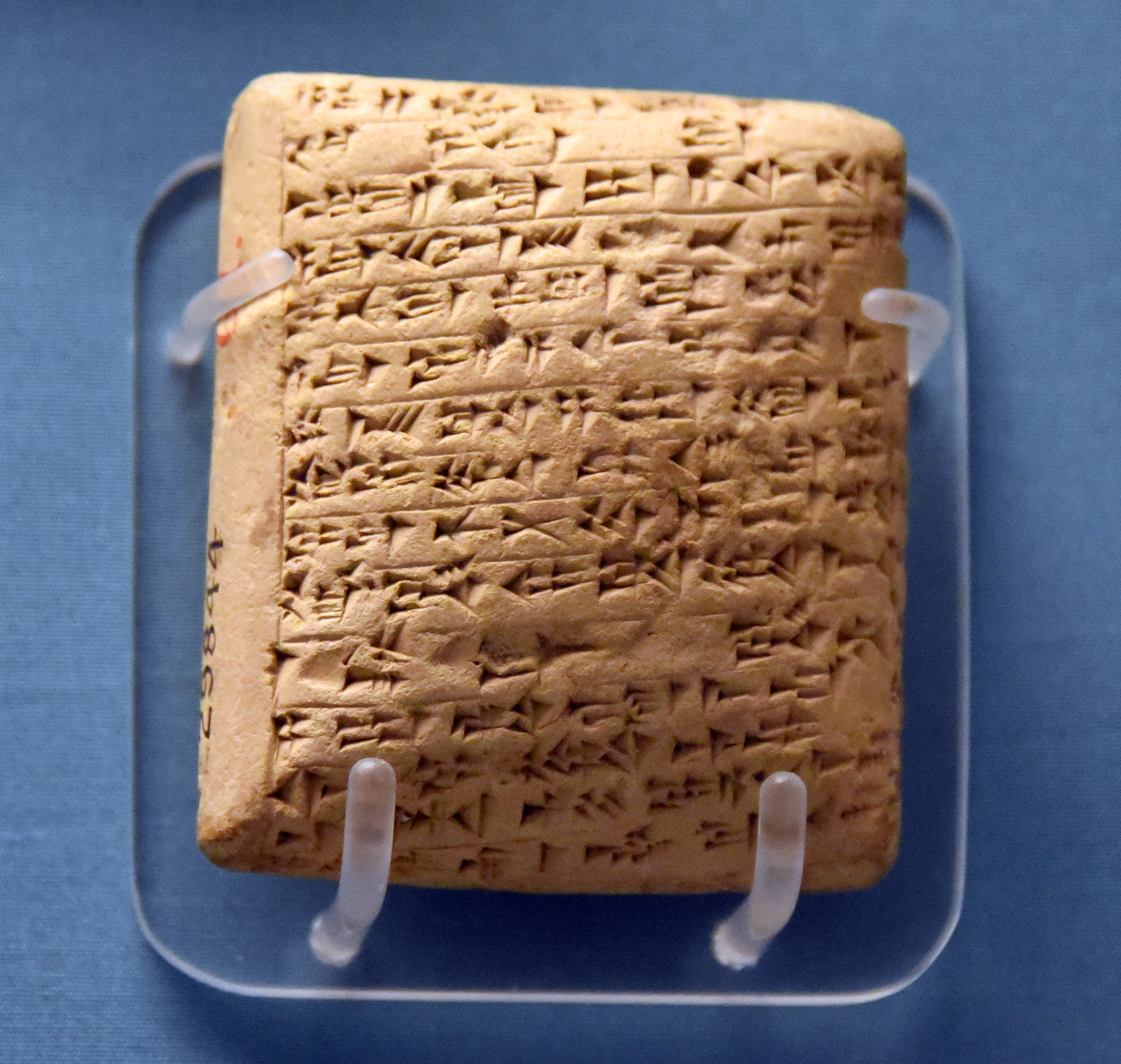
Amarna letter EA 252 from Labaya to the Egyptian Pharaoh Amenhotep III or his son Amenhotep IV around 1350 BC. From Tell el-Amarna, Egypt. British Museum. ME 29844.

Labaya (Labayu or Lib'ayu; fl. c. 1350 BC) was a Canaanite prince and the ruler of Shechem in the central hill country of southern Canaan during the Amarna Period. He lived contemporaneously with the pharaoh Amenhotep IV. Labaya is mentioned in several of the Amarna Letters (abbreviated "EA", for 'el Amarna'). He is the author of letters EA 252–54.

Labaya was active over the whole length of Samaria and slightly beyond, as he gave land to Ḫapiru in the vicinity of Šakmu (Shechem). He and his sons threatened powerful city-states such as Jerusalem and Gazru (Gezer) to the south and Magidda (Tel Megiddo) to the north.

== Career ==
The Amarna letters give an incomplete look at Labaya's career. In the first of Labaya's letters thus far discovered (EA 252), he defends himself to the Pharaoh against complaints of other city rulers about him. For example, the complaint that he has hired mercenaries from among the Habiru. Labaya further admitted to having invaded Gezer and insulting Milkilu. He denied any knowledge of his son's alleged collaboration with the Habiru:

To the king, my lord and my Sun: Thus Lab'ayu, your servant and the dirt on which you tread. I fall at the feet of the king, my lord and my Sun, 7 times and 7 times. I have obeyed the orders that the king wrote to me. Who am I that the king should lose his land on account of me? The fact is that I am a loyal servant of the king! I am not a rebel and I am not delinquent in duty. I have not held back my payments of tribute; I have not held back anything requested by my commissioner. He denounces me unjustly, but the king, my Lord, does not examine my (alleged) act of rebellion. Moreover, my act of rebellion is this: when I entered Gazru-(Gezer), I kept on saying, "Everything of mine the king takes, but where is what belongs to Milkilu? " I know the actions of Milkilu against me! Moreover, the king wrote for my son. I did not know that my son was consorting with the 'Apiru. I hereby hand him over to Addaya-(commissioner). Moreover, how, if the king wrote for my wife, how could I hold her back? How, if the king wrote to me, "Put a bronze dagger into your heart and die", how could I not execute the order of the king?

— (EA 254)

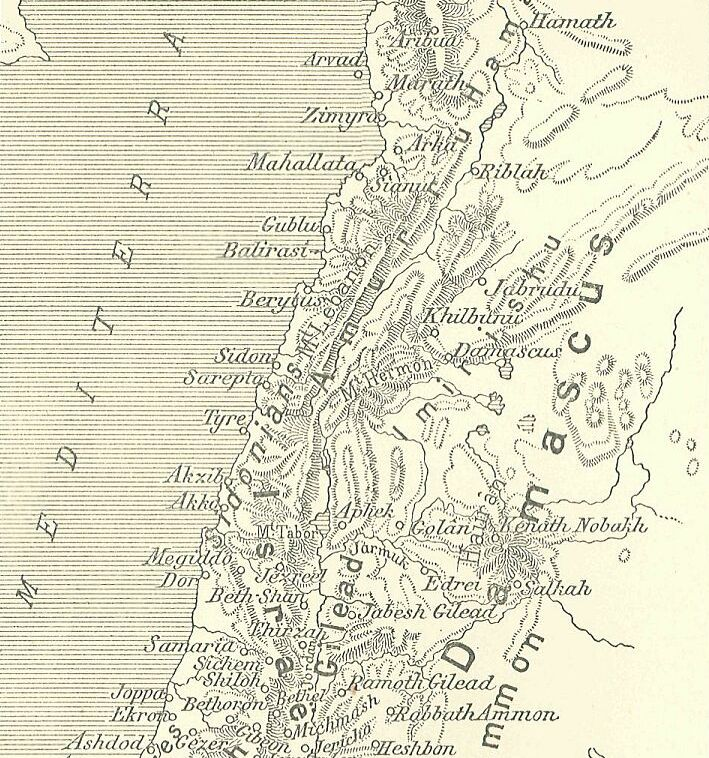
Map of Samaria and its eastern and northern neighbors

Other Canaanite rulers, such as Abdi-Heba of Jerusalem, complained of Labaya's depredations (e.g. EA 289) but note that in later years, Abdi-Heba would himself be referred to as "another Labaya" in EA 280. Labaya was accused of capturing cities that were under Egyptian protection. Biridiya, the king of Megiddo, accused him of besieging his city:

Say to the king-(pharaoh), my lord and my Sun: Message of Biridiya, the loyal servant of the king, I fall at the feet of the king, my lord and my Sun, 7 times and 7 times. May the king, my lord, know that since the return (to Egypt) of the [Egyptian]-archers, Lab'ayu has waged war against me. We are thus unable to do the plucking: Ka-Zi-ra (harvesting), and we are unable to get out of the city gate, because of Lab'ayu. When he learned that archers were not coming out, he immediately determined to take Magidda. May the king save his city lest Lab'ayu seize it. Look, the city is consumed by pestilence, by.... ...So may the king give a garrison of 100 men to guard his city lest Lab'ayu seize it. Look, Lab'ayu has no other purpose. He seeks simply the seizure of Maggida.

— (EA 244)

After receiving numerous complaints about Labaya's behavior, the pharaoh (probably Amenhotep III) finally ordered several Canaanite rulers to take Labaya prisoner and send him to Egypt. Biridiya, ruler of Megiddo, wrote to the pharaoh that Zurata, governor of Akko, had captured Labaya, but accepted a bribe from the latter and released him (EA 245).

Labaya was eventually killed by the citizens of Gina (Beth-Hagan, possibly modern-day Jenin). His death was reported to the Pharaoh's agent, Balu-Ur-Sag, by Labaya's two sons. The sons of Labaya continued to campaign against other Egyptian vassals in Canaan. One of Labaya's sons, Mutbaal, ruled Pella in the Trans-Jordanian part of Canaan. Biryawaza, king of Damascus, was eventually asked to take armed action against Labaya's sons (EA 250).

== List of Labaya's three letters to Pharaoh ==
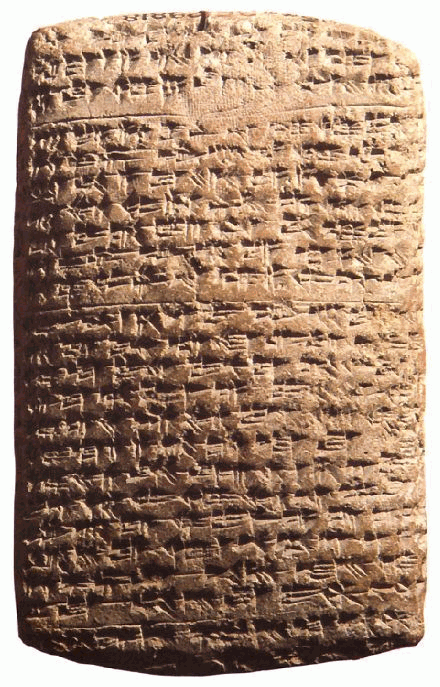
EA 161, letter by Aziru (leader of Amurru) stating his case to pharaoh, one of the Amarna letters in cuneiform writing on a clay tablet

Labaya's name is referenced in fourteen el Amarna letters and his name used thirty-two times. He was the author of letters EA 252–254.

1. EA 252–title: "Sparing one's enemies"
2. EA 253–title: "Neither rebel nor delinquent (1)"
3. EA 254–title: "Neither rebel nor delinquent (2)"'

== Theories ==
=== Identifications with biblical figures ===
Some researchers, such as Richard Abbott, note the possibility that Labaya and the biblical figure of Abimelech ben Gideon, from Judges 9, were identical.

Still others, such as David Rohl, have advocated a totally revised chronology of ancient Israelite and Egyptian history, and instead identify Labaya with Saul, and Mutbaal with Saul's son Ishbaal. Ish-baal and Mutbaal, whose names have the same meaning, "Man of Baal", moved their capital to Transjordan after the death of their fathers, whose center of power had been west of the Jordan river. Rohl further identifies Dadua, Ayab and Yishaya, three figures mentioned by Mutbaal in a later Amarna Letter, with King David, his general Joab and David's father Jesse. The Rohl chronology is not, however, widely accepted. Rohl's suggestions are rejected by other Egyptologists, such as Kenneth Kitchen, who argue that there are discrepancies between the Labaya of the Amarna texts and King Saul as he is described in the Books of Samuel.

== Bibliography ==
- Baikie, James (2004). The Amarna Age. Seattle: University Press of the Pacific. ISBN 1-4102-1510-5.
- Moran, William (1992). The Amarna Letters. Baltimore: Johns Hopkins University Press. ISBN 0-8018-6715-0.
- Rohl, David (1995). Pharaohs and Kings: A Biblical Quest. New York: Crown Publishers. ISBN 0-517-70315-7.
- Westbrook, Raymond (2000). Amarna Diplomacy. Baltimore: Johns Hopkins University Press. ISBN 0-8018-7103-4.
- Benz, Brendon (2016). The Land Before the Kingdom of Israel: A History of the Southern Levant and the People who Populated It. Winona Lake, Indiana: Eisenbrauns. ISBN 978-1-57506-427-7.
