= ʿApiru =

Bronze Age people of the Fertile Crescent

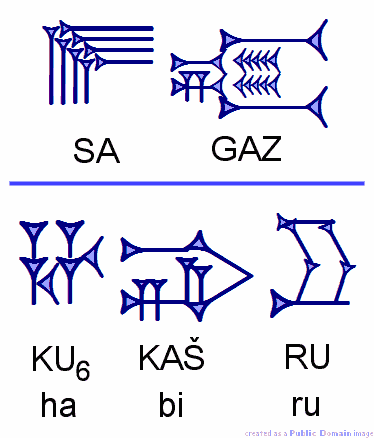
Cuneiform of Sumerian sa.gaz and corresponding West Semitic ha-bi-ru

ʿApiru (Ugaritic: 𐎓𐎔𐎗𐎎, romanized: ʿprm, Ancient Egyptian: 𓂝𓐰𓊪𓐰𓂋𓅱𓀀𓏪, romanized: Ꜥprw), also known in the Akkadian version Ḫabiru (sometimes written Habiru, Ḫapiru or Hapiru; Akkadian: 𒄩𒁉𒊒, ḫa-bi-ru or *ʿaperu) is a term used in 2nd-millennium BCE texts throughout the Fertile Crescent for a social status of people who were variously described as rebels, outlaws, raiders, mercenaries, bowmen, servants, slaves, and laborers.

Some early scholars equated the ʿApiru with the ʿIḇrim, owing to their paronymity. The majority of contemporary scholars no longer accept this view, suggesting that while some early Israelites may have plausibly originated from the ʿApiru class or even borrowed its exonymous designation, the groups as a whole were distinct.

== Etymology ==
a p r w A1 Z3
ꜥpr.w
in hieroglyphs

The term was first discovered in its Akkadian version "ḫa-bi-ru" or "ḫa-pi-ru". Due to later findings in Ugaritic and Egyptian which used the consonants ʿ, p and r, and in light of the well-established sound change from Northwest Semitic ʿ to Akkadian ḫ, the root of this term is proven to be ʿ-p-r. This root means "dust, dirt", and links to the characterization of the ʿApiru as nomads, mercenaries, people who are not part of the cultural society. The morphological pattern of the word is qatilu, which point to a status or condition.

=== The Sumerogram sa.gaz ===
The Akkadian term Ḫabiru occasionally alternates with the Sumerograms sa.gaz. Akkadian dictionaries for Sumerograms added to sa.gaz the gloss ḫabatu "raider", which raised the suggestion to read the Sumerograms as this word. However, the Amarna letters attested the spelling sa ga.az, and letters from Ugarit attested the spelling sa.gaz, which suggests that these Sumerograms were read as written and did not function as ideograms. The only Akkadian word that fits such spelling is "šagašu" (barbarian), but an Akkadian gloss to an Akkadian word seems odd, and the meaning of šagašu doesn't fit the essence of the Ḫabiru. Therefore, the meaning of sa.gaz should probably be found in a West Semitic word such as Aramaic šgš, which means "muddy, restless", while the word ḫabatu should be interpreted as "nomad", which fits the meaning of the word Ḫabiru/ʿApiru.

== Hapiru, Habiru, and ʿApiru ==
In the time of Rim-Sin I (1822 BCE to 1763 BCE), the Sumerians knew a group of Aramaean nomads living in southern Mesopotamia as sa.gaz, which meant "trespassers". The later Akkadians inherited the term, which was rendered as the calque Ḫabiru, properly ʿApiru. The term occurs in hundreds of 2nd millennium BCE documents covering a 600-year period from the 18th to the 12th centuries BCE and found at sites ranging from Egypt, Canaan and Syria, to Nuzi (Upper Mesopotamia near Kirkuk, northern Iraq) and Anatolia (now Turkey).

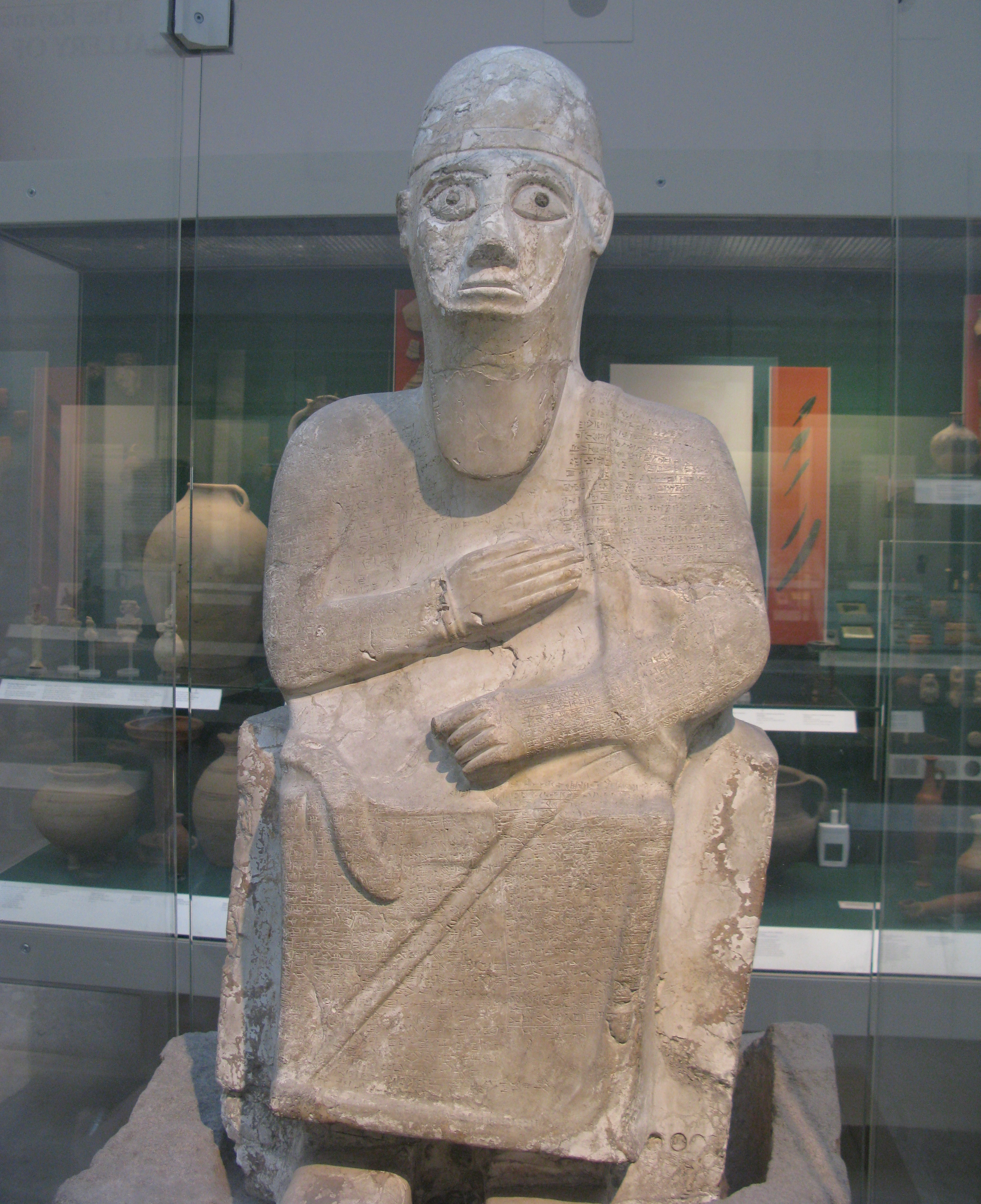
Idrimi of Alalakh

Not all Habiru were brigands: in the 18th century BCE, a north Syrian king named Irkabtum (c. 1740 BCE) "made peace with [the warlord] Shemuba and his Habiru," while the ʿApiru, Idrimi of Alalakh, was the son of a deposed king, and formed a band of ʿApiru to make himself king of Alalakh. What Idrimi shared with the other ʿApiru was membership of an inferior social class of outlaws, mercenaries, and slaves leading a marginal and sometimes lawless existence on the fringes of settled society. ʿApiru had no common ethnic affiliations and no common language, their names being most frequently West Semitic, but also East Semitic, Hurrian or Indo-European.

Areas of reported Habiru activity during the Late Bronze IIA period (based on the Amarna letters corpus)

a p W y r Z1 T14 N25
The spelling of singular ꜥApiru in

"The Conquest of Joppa" tale
in hieroglyphs

Era: New Kingdom
(1550–1069 BC)

In the Amarna letters from the 14th century BCE, the petty kings of Canaan describe them sometimes as outlaws, sometimes as mercenaries, and sometimes as day labourers and servants. Usually they are socially marginal, but Rib-Hadda of Byblos refers to Abdi-Ashirta of Amurru (modern Lebanon) and his son Aziru as ʿApiru, with the implication that they have rebelled against their common overlord, the pharaoh. In The Taking of Joppa (now Jaffa), an Egyptian work of historical fiction from around 1440 BCE, they appear as brigands, and General Djehuty asks at one point that his horses be taken inside the city lest a passing ʿApir steal them.

== Relationship between ʿApiru and biblical Hebrews ==
Since the discovery of the 2nd millennium BCE inscriptions mentioning the ʿApiru, there have been many theories linking these to the Hebrews of the Bible. Most of these theories were based on the supposed etymological link and were widely denied based on the Egyptian sources and later following the Ugaritic and Hittite discoveries.

In the context of the Bible, the term ʿIḇrim is often used to refer to Israelites under "exceptional circumstances", particularly in situations involving wandering, oppression, or degrading servitude. This has led some scholars to conclude that "ʿIḇrim" was heavily associated in the biblical vocabulary with imagery characteristic of, or perhaps even inherited from, the 2nd-millennium BCE ʿApiru. The ethnic connotations of the term are sometimes described as post-exilic in provenance. This is reinforced by the fact that "Hebrew" is occasionally used biblically to refer to clearly non-Israelite groups (1 Sam. 13–14), and is otherwise—when applied to Israelites—used almost universally in the presence of foreigners (Gen. 39:14, Gen. 41:12, and Jon. 1:9); together, these suggest a biblical understanding of ʿIḇrim as an overarching status, untethered to a specific nationality. The only exception, where the use of ʿIḇri seems inconsistent with a general social stratum, is Genesis 14:13 (Hebrew: וַיָּבֹא֙ הַפָּלִ֔יט וַיַּגֵּ֖ד לְאַבְרָ֣ם הָעִבְרִ֑י, romanized: wayyāḇōʾ happālîṭ wayyaggēḏ ləʾaḇrām hāʿiḇrî). Yet other scholars view Abram's unusually martial character in the ensuing passages as proof of a legitimately pre-Israelite ʿApiru recollection. After all, the earliest Mesopotamian mentions of the ʿApiru frequently depict them as military commanders, auxiliaries, or bands of raiders. As a result, some scholars suspect that the earliest proto-Israelite mythic figures may have been of ʿApiru origin, or at least part of a group classified within the ʿApiru fold.

There are other scholars, however, who outright reject any relation between ʿApiru and ʿIḇrim. Anson Rainey and R. Steven Notley, for example, stated that any attempt to relate the ʿApiru to the Hebrews was mistaken, or at most admit only "a bare possibility". They emphasised in particular that ʿ-p-r and ʿ-b-r were unrelated triconsonantal roots, and observed that the Amarna letters clearly distinguished the ʿApiru from the Shutu and Shasu—Syrian pastoral-nomadic groups whom Rainey considered far likelier to have influenced the Hebrews. Their view still remains short of academic consensus. The scholar Moshe Greenberg pointed out that while ʿApiru and ʿIḇrim seem to derive from separate roots—ʿ-p-r and ʿ-b-r, respectively—a linguistic relation between the two is not implausible. Nadav Na’aman and Henri Cazelles went further, both expressing certainty in their direct relationship. Oswald Loretz—though a personal agnostic on the matter—admitted its etymological possibility.

== See also ==
- Ahlamu
- Aamu
- Beisan steles
- Eber
- Foreign relations of Egypt during the Amarna period
