= Haapi =

Ancient Egyptian official

Haapi, also Haip and Ha'ip was a commissioner mentioned in the 1350–1335 BC Amarna letters correspondence. The name "Hapi" in Egyptian is the name for the Nile god Hapi.

Haapi is referenced in 3 letters from the Byblos-(Gubla) corpus of the prolific writer Rib-Hadda, of 68 letters. Haapi is also referenced in letter EA 149 of Abimilku of Tyre-(Surru), (EA for 'el Amarna').

The following letters are referenced to Haapi/Ha'ip:

1. EA 107—Title: "Charioteers, but no horses"–Rib-Hadda letter, (no. 36 of 68). Note: see Maryannu; in letter: mar-i(y)a-nu-ma, =charioteer.
2. EA 132—Title: "The hope for peace". –Rib-Hadda letter, (no. 61 of 68). See: Egyptian commissioner: Pahura.
3. EA 133—Title: "Some advice for the king"–Rib-Hadda letter, (no. 62 of 68).
4. EA 149—Title: "Neither water nor wood"–Abimilku letter no. 4 of 10.

== The letters of commissioner: Haapi/Ha'ip ==
=== EA 149, "Neither water nor wood", letter no. 4 of 10 ===
Letter no. 4 of 10 by Abimilku of Tyre.

To the king-(i.e. pharaoh), my lord, my Sun, my god: Message of Abimilku, [yo]ur servant. I fall at the feet of the king, [m]y lo[rd], 7 times and 7 times. I am the dirt under the feet and sandals of the king, my lord. O king, my lord, you are like the Sun, like Baal, in the sky. May the king give thought to his servant. The king, my lord, charged me with guarding Tyre-("Surru"), the maidservant of the king, but after I wrote an express tablet-(i.e. tablet-letter), to the king, my lord, he has not replied to him. I am a commissioner of the king, my lord, and I am one that brings good news and also bad (news) to the king, my lord. May the king send 20 palace attendants to guard his city in order that I may go in to the king, my lord, and see his face. What is the life of a palace attendant when breath does not come forth from the mouth of the king, his lord? But he lives if the king writes [t]o his servant, and he lives [for]ever.
For my part, [si]nce last year [my intention has been] to go in [and beho]ld the face of the king, my lord, [but Zimredda-( of Sidon/Siduna), the p]rince, [heard about m]e. He made [my caravan] turn back [fro]m the king, my lord, [saying, "Who c]an get you in [to the king?" Hea]r, my lord! Aziru, [the son of Abdi-Ašratu, [the re]bel against the king, [has taken possession of Sumur. Haapi [...] ...[g]ave Sumur [t]o Aziru. May the king not neglect [th]is city and his land. When I hear the name of the king and the name of his army, they will be very afraid, and all the land will be afraid, that is, he who does not follow the king, my lord. The king knows whether you installed me as commissioner in Tyre. (Still), Zimredda seized Usu from (his) servant. I abandoned it, and so we have neither water nor wood. Nor is there a place where we can put the dead. So may the king, my lord, give thought to his servant.
The king, my lord, wrote to me on a tablet, "Write whatever you hear to the king." Zimredda of Sidon, the rebel against the king, and the men of Arwada have exchan(ge)d oaths among themselves, and they have assembled their ships, chariots, and infantry, to capture Tyre, the maidservant of the king. If the powerful hand of the king comes-(i.e. the archer-forces), it will defeat them. They will not be able to capture Tyre. They captured Sumur through the instructions of Zimredda, who brings the word of the king to Aziru. I sent a tablet to the king, my lord, but he has not replied to his servant. [Si]nce last year there has been wa[r a]gainst me. There is no water, [th]ere is no wood. May he send a tablet to his servant so he may go in and see his face. May the king [give thought] to his servant and to his city, and may he not [abandon] his city and his land. Why should [a commissioner of] the king, our lord, move awa[y] from the land? [Zimredda] knows, and the traitor knows, that the arm of the king is absent. Now a palace attendant [is bringing] my tablet to the king, the Sun, [my] lord, and may the king reply to his servant. -EA 149, lines 1-84, (complete, with lacunae)

(Abimilku points out to Pharaoh, that Pharaoh is still communicating with Aziru, by tablet-letter.)

=== EA 132, "The hope for peace" ===
Rib-Hadda letter; see Egyptian commissioner: Pahura.

=== EA 107, "Charioteers, but no horses" ===
See also Maryannu; in letter: mar-i(y)a-nu-ma, =charioteer.

Rib-Hadda says to (his) lord, king of all countries, Great King, King of Battle: May the Lady of Gubla grant power to the king, my lord. I fall at the feet of my lord, my Sun, 7 times and 7 times. Being a loyal servant of the king, the Sun, with my mouth I speak words-(('matters'/'discussions')) to the king that are nothing but the truth. May the king, my lord, heed the words of his loyal servant. May the archer-commander stay in Sumur-(Zemar), but fetch Ha'ip to yourself, examine him, and find out about [his] affai[rs]. Then if it pleas[es] you, appoint as its commissioner someone respected by the kin[g's] mayors. May my lord heed my words. Seeing that Aziru, the son of 'Abdi-Aširta, is in Damascus-("Dimašqu"), along with his brothers, send archers that they might take him, and the land of the king be at peace. If things go as they are now, Sumur will not stand. Moreover, may the king, my lord, heed the words of his loyal servant. There is no money to pay for horses; everything is gone so that we might stay alive.. So give me 30–pairs of horses along with chariots. I have charioteers: mar-ia-nu-ma, but I do not have a horse to march against the enemies of the king. Accordingly, I am afraid, and accordingly, I have not gone to Sumur. -EA 107, lines 1-48 (~complete, undamaged-(with Notes))

EA 107 is a virtually undamaged tablet-letter. 107 also shows the precise spelling of the term: charioteer/Maryannu.

The 'matters'/'discussions', (i.e. the topic), of this letter appears to be twofold: 1) Ha'ip justification, or appropriateness as a commissioner, and 2) the events in Damascus/Dimašqu with the warring Aziru.

== See also ==
- Pahura, Egyptian commissioner
- Tyre, Lebanon and Usu
- Hapi
