= Yapa-Hadda =

Mayor of Biruta

Yapa-Hadda, also Yapah-Hadda (fl. c. 1340 BC) was the mayor or ruler of Biruta of the 1350-1335 BC Amarna letters correspondence.

Yapa-Hadda is referenced in 13 letters of the Amarna letters 382–letter corpus, and specifically in relation to neighboring Gubla-(Byblos), ruled by Rib-Hadda, (who was the most prolific writer of the Amarna letters, (68)). Yapa-Hadda is sometimes the subject of letters, typically involved with his ships, and a collusion of cities, all against Gubla and Rib-Haddi.

Yapa-Hadda is the author of two letters, both sent to the pharaoh, one by way of Šumu-Haddi, (EA 97), the other to the pharaoh by way of an Egyptian commissioner (EA 98), (EA is for 'el Amarna').

== The intrigued letters of Yapah-Hadda ==
=== EA 113, title: "War and peace" ===
This letter is tablet-II of a two-tablet letter. Letter no. 42 of 68, authored by Rib-Hadda of Gubla: (Tablet 113–I is nonexistent.)

"Moreover, ... -lacuna of 3 lines-(a 2nd letter(two-tablet letter))
... Inquire from another may[or]. Is he not [always] c[ommitting] or plotting a crime? Look, Yapah-Hadda has commit[ted] a crime. Be informed! [What] has the king-(i.e. pharaoh), done to hi[m]? Moreover, what have I done t[o] Yapah-Hadda that he plo[ts] evil upon evil against m[e]? As he has plundered two of my ships and my sheep and goats so that the amount of my property in his possession is very large, may the king [se]nd his commissioner [to de]cide between the two of us. [Everything] that [is ta]ken from him [may he (the king) take]. Concerning [my] property [that] is in [his] possession [he should inquire of] my [m]en ... [... fr]om Rib-Hadda, [and] for the 'Apiru, has [all of it] be[en acquired], but there is no one that [can ta]ke anything belonging to him from my [hand]. Why am [I] not able like my associates to send a man to the palace? Their cities are theirs, [and] they are at peace. May the Sun establish [my] honor in your presence so that you bring peace to [your servant], and then he will never leave your side. Tell Amanmašša to sta[y] with me so he can brin[g] my tablet to yo[u. For] once he goes off, there will be no one to bring [my tablet] to you. So may the [k]ing be con[cerned] about Amanmašša [so] he sta[ys with me] ... and Yapah-Hadda ... [So send] provisions for the cities t[hat have not] turned again[st you]." -EA 113–II, lines 4-48 (complete, but with lacunae)

=== EA 97, title: "A bad reputation" ===
Letter of Yapa-Hadda sent to the Egyptian pharaoh by way of Sumu Haddi:

"To Šumu-Hadd[i (...): Mes]sage of Yap pa[h-Hadda]. May (your personal) god show concern for you. [I kn]ow that your reputation with the king-(i.e. pharaoh) is [b]ad, and so you cannot leave Egypt-('Mizri', see: Mizraim). You did [n]ot cause the loss of [the king's lands; 'Abdi-Aširta c]aused the loss. ....
... ..." -EA 97 (complete lines 1-11; 12-21(end) is a lacuna)

=== EA 98, title: "Losses from Byblos to Ugarit" ===
Letter sent to Egypt, and commissioner, Yanhamu:

"[S]ay [t]o Yanhamu: Message of Yapah-Hadda. Why have you been neglectful of Sumur-(Zemar), so that all lands from Gubla to Ugarit have become enemies in the service of Aziru? Šigata and Ampi-(Enfeh) are enemies. He has now [st]ationed ships of Arw[ad]a [i]n Ampi and in Šigata so grain cannot be brought into Sumur. Not are we able to enter Sumur, and so what can we ourselves do? Write to the palace about this [mat]ter. It is good [tha]t you are inf(or)med." -EA 98, lines 1-26 (complete)

== See also ==
- Amanmašša, Egyptian official
- Yanhamu, Egyptian commissioner
- Gubla
- Beirut
