= Subartu =

Bronze Age city-state mentioned in the Amarna Letters

The Akkadian Empire under Naram-Sin, Subartu is shown north.

The land of Subartu (Akkadian: Šubartum/Subartum/ina Šú-ba-ri, Assyrian: mât Šubarri) or Subar (Sumerian: Su-bir_{4}/Subar/Šubur, Ugaritic: 𐎘𐎁𐎗 ṯbr) is mentioned in Bronze Age literature and was inhabited by the Subarians. The name also appears as Subari in the Amarna letters, and, in the form Šbr, in Ugarit.

Subartu was apparently a kingdom in Upper Mesopotamia, at the upper Tigris and later it referred to a region of Mesopotamia. Most scholars suggest that Subartu is an early name for people of upper Mesopotamia proper on the Tigris and westward, although there are various other theories placing it sometimes a little farther to the east and/or north. Its precise location has not been identified. From the point of view of the Akkadian Empire, Subartu marked the northern geographical horizon, just as Amurru, Elam and Sumer marked "west", "east" and "south", respectively, functioning as a term to mean 'north'.

== History ==
Another possible location of Subartu

The Sumerian mythological epic Enmerkar and the Lord of Aratta lists the countries where the "languages are confused" as Subartu, Hamazi, Sumer, Uri-ki (Akkad), and the Martu land (the Amorites). The earliest references to the "four-quarters" by the kings of Akkad name Subartu as one of these quarters around Akkad, along with Martu, Elam, and Sumer. Subartu in the earliest texts seem to have been farming mountain dwellers, frequently raided for slaves.

Eannatum of Lagash was said to have smitten Subartu or Shubur, and it was listed as a province of the empire of Lugal-Anne-Mundu; in a later era Sargon of Akkad campaigned against Subar, and his grandson Naram-Sin listed Subar along with Armani, which has been identified with Aleppo, among the lands under his control. Ishbi-Erra of Isin and Hammurabi also claimed victories over Subar.

Three of the 14th-century BC Amarna letters – Akkadian cuneiform correspondence found in Egypt – mention Subari as a toponym. All are addressed to Akhenaten; in two (EA 108 and 109), Rib-Hadda, king of Byblos, complains that Abdi-Ashirta, ruler of Amurru, had sold captives to Subari, while another (EA 100), from the city of Irqata, also alludes to having transferred captured goods to Subari.

There is also a mention of "Subartu" in the 8th century BC Poem of Erra (IV, 132), along with other lands that have harassed Babylonia in Neo-Babylonian times (under Nabopolassar, Nebuchadnezzar II and Nabonidus).

Subartu may have been in the general sphere of influence of the Hurrians.

== Amarna letters corpus ==
Subartu (Subaru of the letters) is a toponym mentioned in the Amarna letters (14th century BC); the letters were written in the short period approximately from 1350–1335 BC. It is commonly accepted that the region referenced was Subartu.

Subartu is only referenced in three of the Amarna letters: EA 100, 108, and EA 109. All three letters state that people, or 'items' are needed to be sold in Subaru, for money.

=== The letters referencing region Subartu ===
Subaru of the letters is only referenced in three Amarna letters, and with no links to any rulers of Subaru.

The following are the letters referencing Subartu:

EA 100—Title: "The city of Irqata to the king" -See Arqa, Amarna letters Irqata
EA 108—Title: "Unheard-of deeds" -letter of Rib-Hadda
EA 109—Title: "Then and now" -letter of Rib-Hadda

==== EA 108, "Unheard-of deeds" ====
"Rib-Hadda writes to his lord, king of all countries, Great King, King of Battle: May the Lady of Gubla grant power to the king, my lord. I fall at the feet of my lord, my Sun, 7 times and 7 times. Moreover, is it pleasing in the sight of the king, who is like Baal and Šamaš in the sky, that the sons of 'Abdi-Aširta do as they please? They have taken the king's horses and chariots, and they have sold into captivity, charioteers: ši-x-y(?) and soldiers to ((to))-(emphasis?) the land of Su(ba)ru. In whose lifetime has such a deed been done? False words are now being spoken in the presence of the king, the Sun. I am your loyal servant, and whatever I know or have heard I write to the king, my lord. Wh[o] are they, the dogs, that they could res[ist] the archers of the king, the Sun? I wrote t[o] ((to))-(emphasis?) your father-(i.e. Amenhotep III), and he he[eded] my wor[d]s, and he sent ar[ch]ers. Did he not take 'Abdi-Aširta for h[imself]? Moreover, since the mayors have not oppo[sed] th[em], they are stron[g]. The army furnishes whatever they ne[ed], and so they are not afra[id] of the magnate. Because they have taken the hors[es], they are bold. Because we know that they are strong, we have to(ld) the king, "They are strong," Truly, they will not prevail. When I sent 2 messengers to Sumur-(Zemar), I retained this man in order to report to the king. Moreover, why do you listen to other men? The king's messengers must bring (news) by night and bring (it) back by night because of the dog. If the king, the Sun, desires, they will be taken in a day. Moreover, has he [n]o[t] plotted evils [upon evils a]gainst you, and rev[olted? A]nd as for the man of [my] god, 'Apiru came from Sumur to take him prisoner, but I did not give him up. May the [k]ing he[ed] the words of his servant. Send me [2]0 men from Meluhha and 20 men from Egypt-(named 'Mizri'-see Mizraim), to guard the city for the king, the Sun, my lord. (I am)-Your loyal se[rvan]t. -EA 108, lines 1-69 (complete)

== See also ==
- Saparda
