= Pahura =

Pahura, and also spelled Pihur/Pihuru, Pihura, and Pihuru/Pihure was a commissioner of the 1350 BC Amarna letters correspondence. Pahura's name means in Egyptian, ' the Syrian ' , and he was commissioner to the Egyptian pharaoh.

Pahura is referenced in 9-letters of the Amarna letters corpus. Two damaged partial letters are only topically identified by Pahura's name, with no other references: letters EA 207 and 208, (EA for 'el Amarna').

== An example letter (with commissioner Pihura) ==
The largest sub-corpus of Amarna letters is from the Rib-Haddi corpus: namely Rib-Hadda of Gubla-(Byblos). EA 132, entitled: "The hope for peace" shows some of the intrigues of the 68-letter Rib-Haddi corpus of letters.

=== EA 132, "The hope for peace" ===
Letter no. 61 of 68 by Rib-Haddi.

[S]ay [to] the king, my lord, m[y] Sun: Message of Rib-Hadda, your [ser]vant. May the Lady of Gubla grant power to the king, my lord. I fall at the feet of my lord 7 times and 7 times. Moreover, give thought to Gubla, your loyal city. Earlier, 'Abdi-Aširta attacked me, and I wrote to your father, (i.e. Amenhotep III), "Send the royal archers, and the entire land will be taken in a day." Did he not take fo[r himself' 'Abdi-Aširt[a], together with his possessions? Now Aziru has gathered a[ll] the 'Apiru and has said to them, "If Gubla is not ... [...]" [L]ook, Yanhamu being with you, a[sk him] if I did not say to him, "If you make an alliance ... [...] with the sons of 'Abdi-Aširta, they will take you prisoner." He listened t[o me], and he guarded the c[ities] of the king, his lord. I said the same thing to Pawura so he would not listen to the words of Ha'ip, (named for god: Hapi), whose father turned the citi[es] into enemies. Now Ha'ip has hand[ed over] Sumur-(Zemar). May the king not neglect this deed, since a commissioner was killed. If now you are negligent, then Pihura will not stay in Kumidu, and all your [ma]yors will be killed. I keep (wr)iting like this to the pa[lac]e, [but] no attention is paid [t]o me. Send ships to fetch the Lady's property and me. [Sen]d 50–100 men and 50–100 m[en fro]m Meluhha, 50 chariots, [to g]uard [the city] for you. Se[nd] archers and bring peace to the land. -EA 132, lines 1-59 (lacuna of 3-4 middle sentences)

== See also ==
- Rib-Hadda
- Haapi, Egyptian commissioner
- Yanhamu, Egyptian commissioner
- Pawura, Egyptian official
- Text corpus
