= Amarna letter EA 149 =

Amarna letter EA 149, titled: "Neither Water nor Wood" is a moderate- to extended-length clay tablet Amarna letter (mid 14th century BC) from Abimilku of Tyre-(called Ṣurru in the letters), written to the Pharaoh of Egypt.

The letter concerns the intrigues of neighboring city-states and their rulers, and the loss of the neighboring city of Usu, from where the island of Tyre obtained supplies, for example, water, wood, etc. and a place for burying their deceased.

EA 149 is located at the British Museum, no BM 29811. Tablet letter EA 149 can be viewed here: Reverse: , Obverse: .

== The letter ==
=== EA 149: "Neither Water nor Wood" ===
EA 149, letter four of ten from the Abimilku. (Not a linear, line-by-line translation.)

Obverse (Image: )

(Lines 1-5)--To the king, my lord, my Sun, my god: Message of Abi-Milku, [yo]ur servant. I fall at the feet of the king, [m]y lo[rd], 7 times and 7 times. I am the dirt under the feet and sandals of the king, my lord.
(6-20)--((O)) King, my lord, you are like the Sun, like Baal,^{1} in the sky. May the king give thought to his servant. The king, my lord, charged me with guarding Tyre, the maidservant of the king, but after I wrote an express tablet to the king, my lord, he has not replied to him. I am a commissioner of the king, my lord, and I am one that brings good news and also bad (news) to the king, my lord. May the king send 20 palace attendants to guard his city in order that I may go in to the king, my lord, and see his face[i.e. presence].
(21-27--What is the life of a palace attendant when breath does not come forth from the mouth of the king, his lord? But he lives if the king writes [t]o his servant, and he lives [for]ever.
(28-40)--For my part, [si]nce last year [my intention has been] to go in [and beho]ld the face((presence)) of the king, my lord, [but Zimredda, the p]rince, [heard about m]e. He made [my caravan] turn back [fro]m the king, my lord, [saying, "Who c]an get you in [to the king?" Hea]r,^{2} my lord! Aziru, [the son of 'Abdi]-Ashirta, [the re]bel against the king, [has taken possession of Sumu]r.

Reverse (Image: )

(38-40)--.. Haapi [ ... ] ... [g]ave Sumur [t]o Aziru.
(40-54)--May the king not neglect [th]is city and his land. When I hear the name of the king and the name of his army, they will be very afraid, and all the land will be afraid, that is, he who does not follow the king, my lord. The king knows whether you installed me as commissioner in Tyre. ((Still)), Zimredda seized Usu from (his) servant. I abandoned it, and so we have neither water nor wood. Nor is there a place where we can put the dead. So may the king, my lord, give thought to his servant.
(54-63)--The king, my lord, wrote to me on a tablet, "Write whatever you hear to the king." ((1))- Zimredda of Si-Du-Na-(Sidon), ((2))- and Aziru, rebel against the king, ((3))- and the men of Arwada have exchan(ge)d^{3} oaths among themselves, and they
(61)--have assembled their ships, (MÁ-MEŠ)
(62)--chariots, and infantry,^{4}
(63-63) to capture Tyre, the maidservant of the king.

(64-73)--If the powerful hand of the king comes, it will defeat them. They will not be able to capture Tyre. They captured Sumur through the instructions of Zimredda, who brings the word-("matters") of the king to Aziru. I sent-(wrote) a tablet to the king, my lord, but he has not replied to his servant.
(74-84)--[Si]nce last year there has been wa[r a]gainst me. There is no water, [th]ere is no wood. May he send a tablet-(a request tablet) to his servant so he may go in and see his face-(presence).

Left side

(78-84)--May the king [give thought] to his servant and to his city, and may he not [abandon] his city and his land. Why should [a commissioner of] the king, our lord, move awa[y] from the land? [Zimredda] knows, and the traitor knows-(traitors? know), that the arm^{5} of the king is absent. Now a palace attendant [is bringing] my tablet to the king, the Sun, [my] lord, and may the king reply to his servant. --(EA 149, Obv. & Reverse complete except a large obverse flake (see photo), and missing bottom of obverse-(top of reverse ~5 lines damaged).)

== See also ==
- Abimilku
- Amarna letters–phrases and quotations
