= Ushu =

Ancient city near Tyre, modern Lebanon

Coordinates: 33°16′12″N 35°11′46″E

Ushu (in the Amarna Letters Usu) was an ancient Phoenician mainland city that supplied the city of Tyre with water, supplies and burial grounds. Its name was based upon the Phoenician mythical figure Usoos or Ousoüs, a descendant of Genos and Genea whose children allegedly discovered fire, as recorded by Phoenician author Sanchuniathon (Sankunyaton).

== 1350 BC, Amarna letters Usu ==
The 1350–1335 BC Amarna Letters correspondence refers to mainland Usu in three letters of Abimilku of Tyre. The three letters, EA 148, 149, 150-(EA for 'el Amarna'), are the only references to Usu in the 382 letters corpus and are grouped because of the topic, partially Usu, of the three letters.

Of note, Abimilku is nowhere else referenced by name in any other letters of the correspondence, except his own letters, all addressed to the Ancient Egyptian pharaoh. Abimilku's ten letters, EA 145 to EA 155, mostly have the conflict of Tyre with Zimredda of Sidon, the Habiru, or Aziru of Amurru-(especially EA 148, with Usu). Zimredda is the topic of five of the ten letters. In letter EA 149, with commissioner Haapi, the pharaoh is seeking information about Zimredda.

In the three letters with Usu, water, wood, straw, clay and burial grounds (the dead) are referenced. Pottery may be implied with some of the materials, as well as food, and the straw or wood for fire.

=== Three letters referring to Usu ===
1. EA 148–"The need for mainland Tyre".
2. EA 149–"Neither water nor wood".
3. EA 150–"Needed: just one soldier".

- "Ousous took a tree, and, having stripped off the branches, was the first who ventured to embark on the sea" (Eusebius, quoting Philo of Byblos, Praeparatio Evangelica Bk I, 10, 10)
- “[Tyre’s] numbers swelled greatly in time of war, when residents of nearby cities on the mainland (such as Ushu) found refuge on the island.” (Katzenstein, H.J., The History of Tyre, 1973, p10)
- “Besides the city itself, well-protected by its location on an island, the kingdom of Tyre included a strip of mainland, whose center was the town of Ushu.” (Katzenstein, H.J., The History of Tyre, 1973, p29)
- “Ousoüs is, of course, Ushu or Uzu, the ancient name of the mainland city...During most periods, the majority of the population must have lived on the mainland, while the island area was an administrative and religious center. As an administrative center, it would have contained the palaces of the ruler and probably stations for the army as well, and as a religious center, it had temples serving the city and the region.” (Bikai, Pierre, The Land of Tyre, found in chapter 2 of Martha Joukowsky's “The Heritage of Tyre” 1992, pp13–15)
- Remarking about the many times Tyre was attacked leading up to, and including Nebuchadnezzar, Maurice Chehab, the Director general of Antiquities in Lebanon says, “If the invaders, however, sometimes succeeded in subduing the coast (i.e. Ushu), the island, which was the heart of Tyre’s maritime empire, eluded them.” (Chehab, Maurice, Tyre, trans: Afaf Rustum Chalhoub, p11)
- “A wall relief at Karnak lists the cities Sethos I (or Seti I, Ramesses II’s father) conquered, among them Tyre and Ushu. Ushu appears as if it were part of the Tyrian kingdom.” (Badre, Leila, Canaanite Tyre, found in chapter 4 of Martha Joukowsky's “The Heritage of Tyre” 1992, p 40) see also Katzenstein p 49, (both citing James B. Pritchard's Ancient Near East in Pictures nos. 327, 331)
- Moran, William L. The Amarna Letters. Johns Hopkins University Press, 1987, 1992. (softcover, ISBN 0-8018-6715-0)
