= Amanmašša =

Potential 14th-century BC Egyptian official

Amanmašša is the name of an Egyptian official, but probably two separate officials (?), in the 1350–1335 BC Amarna letters correspondence. The Egyptian form of his name is Amenmose, which means "Amun-born".

Amanmašša is only referenced in two letters of the Byblos sub-corpus of Rib-Hadda, EA 113 and 114; EA is for 'el Amarna'. Both letters have depth, (are complex) and reference Yapa-Hadda of Biruta-(Beirut) and involve: ships, control of grain for food, war, desertion of Rib-Hadda people-(citizens of Gubla-Byblos), etc.

Amarna letter EA 114 has the distinction of being the only letter of the 382–Amarna letter correspondence referencing Alashiya/Cyprus-(and concerning Amanmašša), besides the letters EA 34–EA 40 that are from Alashiya, and the unnamed "King of Alashiya".

== The letters for "Official: Amanmašša" ==
=== Rib-Hadda EA 113, title: "War and peace" ===
See: Yapa-Hadda

=== Rib-Hadda EA 114, title: "Loyalty and its rewards" ===
Starting at line 26:

"...
Look, I (must) keep writing like (th)is to you about Sumur-(Zemar). Look, I did go and I strongly urged the troops to [guard i]t, but now they have abandoned it, [and] the garrison [has deserted]. And [for this reason I keep wr]iting. I have sent [ ... ] a messenger of mine time and again. How often did I send him and he was unable to get into Sumur! They have blocked all the roads against him. That fellow–(i.e. Yapa-Hadda of Beirut), looks with pleasure on the war against me and Sumur. For 2 months he has been encamped against me. For what reason is your loyal servant so treated? For service to you! If you are unable to fetch you[r] servant, then send archers to fetch me. It would be good to be with you. The enemies of the king are at war with me, as are his mayors, to whom he gives thought. For this reason my situation is extremely grave. Look, ask the other Amanmašša if it was not (from) Alashiya that I sent him to you. Give thought to your loyal servant. Pre[vi]ously, my peasantry got provisions from the "land of Yarimuta", but now, now Yapah-Hadda does not let them go. W[hy are you negl]igent? [The king must] send a garrison [to protect] your loyal [servant ...] the enemies of the king, for they make a mayor who serves you with loyalty prowl about. Moreover, give thought to me. Who will be loyal were I to die? Look, Yapah-Hadda is on the side of Aziru. " -EA 114, (complete, lines 26-69(End)) (some damaged words, or lost)

== See also ==
- Yapa-Hadda, mayor of Biruta-(Beirut)
- Rib-Hadda
- Amarna letters
- Alashiya/Cyprus
- Amenmesse–Pharaoh
