= As (cuneiform) =

Cuneiform sign

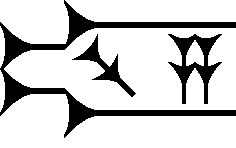
(digitized)-Cuneiform sign for as, aṣ, az

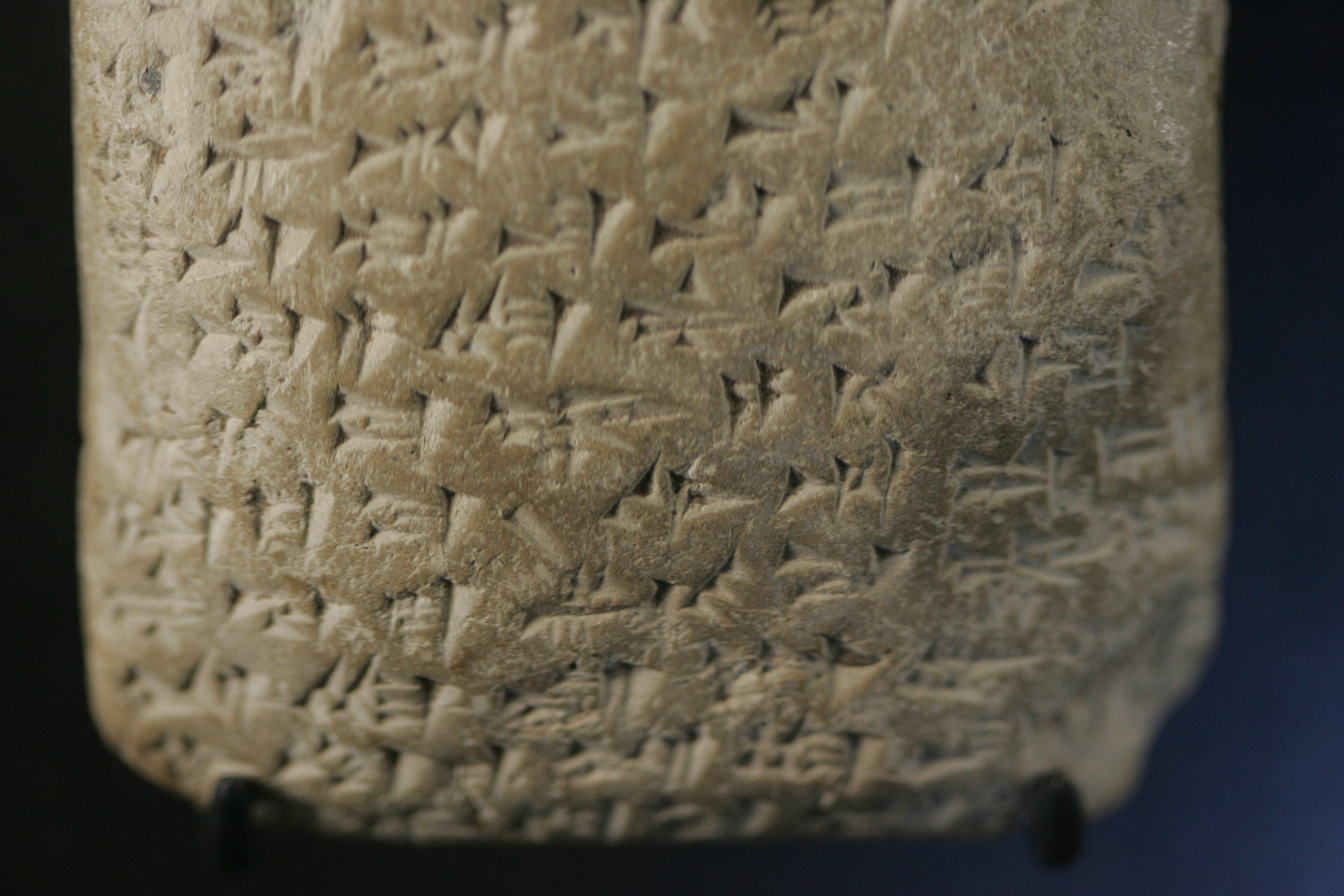
Amarna letter EA 365, "Furnishing Corvée Workers", Biridiya to Pharaoh, reverse (lines 15–30, (31)). 5th line from bottom, (line 23), "LÚ-MEŠ–ma-as-sà-meš (and)". Line 25, 3rd from bottom, repeats the long name. (high resolution, expandible photo)

The cuneiform as sign, also aṣ, and az, is found in both the 14th century BC Amarna letters and the Epic of Gilgamesh. As as and az in the Amarna letters it appears identical in form in both Amarna letters EA 365, and EA 362. In the photo of the bottom half of Amarna letter EA 365 (subject corvée farm work), it is used to name the workers as: LÚ-MEŠ-(plural)–ma-as-sà-meš-(plural), (amēlu-massu)

In the Epic of Gilgamesh, (Tablets I-XII) it is used as follows: as, 26 times, aṣ, 25, and az, 21.

== Amarna letters usage ==
In the Amarna letters, it is rendered differently from the electronic, digitized version. The description for both usages, on letters EA 365, and EA 362 is as follows: the inside sub-parts are found outside the 2-pairs of horizontal strokes; also the right stroke pair, shows the bottom stroke angled down-to-the-right (providing a space for the 2-angled strokes, instead on 362 and 365, a 'coupled-horizontal-sub-pair'). The ending, right 2-strokes made for the 4+4+2 stroke sign, are following the sign, and between the right 2 paired horizontal strokes (in the space between; stroke ten is placed upon stroke 9, making a coupled last two strokes, by final right position).

The 4-vertical, short strokes can be seen to lie upon, and between the bottom left-horizontal (its end), and the beginning of the right-horizontal stroke; consequently, either the final group of 4-strokes, or the 'final' 2-strokes, make up the last strokes in the making of the sign. Being that the sign is in a sub-group of "coupound signs", (signs 'added-to', 'surrounded-by' (enclosed-within) other strokes), it may be assumed the usage of the sa cuneiform is for more specialized, or unique situations. In Amarna letter EA 362, Rib-Hadda to Pharaoh, a long discussion involves the 'territories' (city-states), and other individuals, and unrest in the region surrounding Byblos. The sign is used in the word "falsehood", ('lie'), (ka-az-bu-te), line 53, Rib-Hadda claiming he is not lying, (or misleading) the Pharaoh.

Amarna letter 362, lines 51, and following:

"... (51) And my lord knows that (52) I do not write words (53) of falsehood (ka-az-bu-te) to my lord. (54) And all the city rulers (55) do not like it that (56) archer-troops come forth, ..."
