= Bad (cuneiform) =

Cuneiform sign

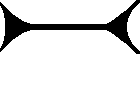
Digitized cuneiform sign for bad, bat, be, etc., and 5 sumerograms in Epic of Gilgamesh. (see text)

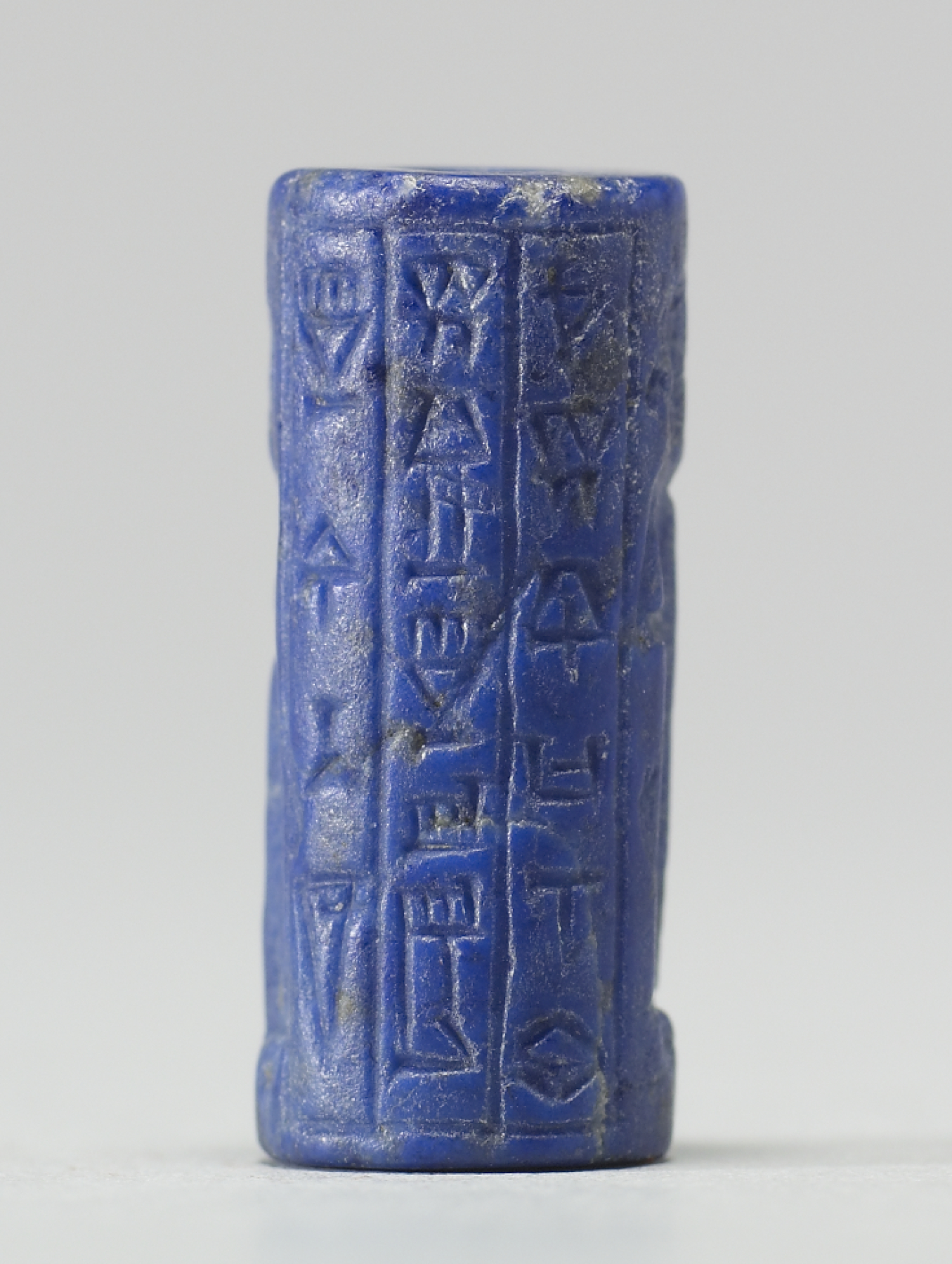
Near Eastern cylinder seal (Walters 42699; see clay impression below) signs read down from top: column left (line no. 1), 3rd sign is the bad sign. Note line no. 1 appears as "line 3", until printed in the clay, and then appearing as "line no. 1".

The cuneiform bad, bat, be, etc. sign is a common multi-use sign in the mid 14th-century BC Amarna letters, and the Epic of Gilgamesh. In the Epic it also has 5 sumerogram uses (capital letter (majuscule)). From Giorgio Buccellati (Buccellati 1979) 'comparative graphemic analysis' (about 360 cuneiform signs, nos. 1 through no. 598E), of 5 categories of letters, the usage numbers of the bad sign are as follows: Old Babylonian Royal letters (71), OB non-Royal letters (392), Mari letters (2108), Amarna letters (334), Ugarit letters (39).

The following linguistic elements are used for the bad sign in the 12 chapter (Tablets I-Tablet XII) Epic of Gilgamesh:

bad (not in Epic)
bat
be
mid
mit
sun
til
ziz

sumerograms:

BE
IDIM
TIL
ÚŠ
ZIZ

The following usage numbers for the linguistic elements of sign bad in the Epic are as follows: bad, (0 times), bat, (61), be, (16), mid, (7), mit, (8), sun, (1), til, (11), ziz, (8), BE, (2), IDIM, (2), TIL, (1), ÚŠ, (2), ZIZ, (1).

Instead of a large horizontal, as seen in the (digitized form, but one type of "bad"), the sign is seen in the Amarna letters as composed of two opposite facing (triangles), the wedges. It can be seen here , Amarna letter EA 153-(lines 153:4, 11), for "King-Lord-mine", "LUGAL, Be-li-ia", or Be-lí-ia", where "bēlu" is Akkadian for "lord".

== Literature examples ==
=== Amarna letters ===
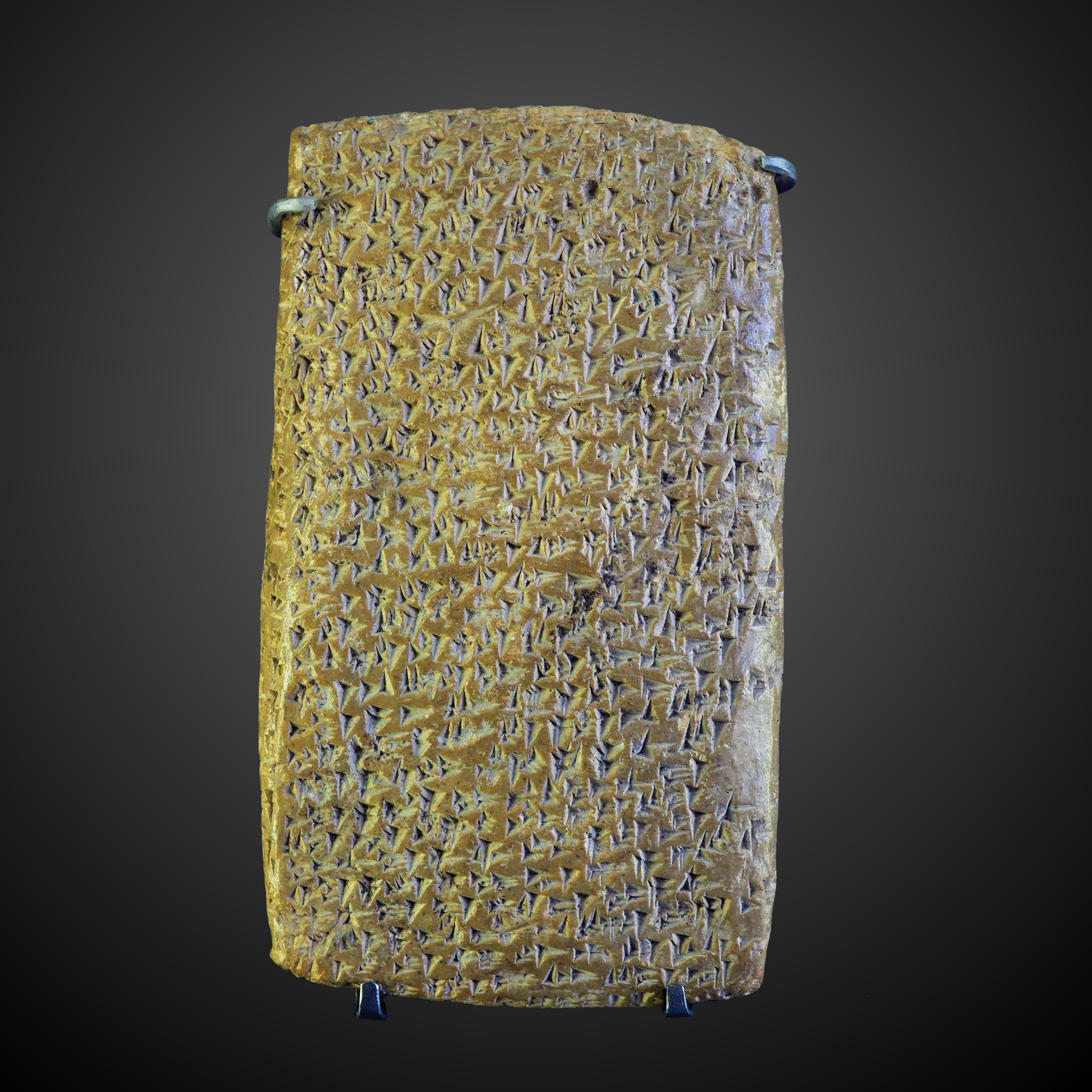
Amarna letter EA 362-(Reverse, lines 31–65), Rib-Haddi to Pharaoh, titled "A Commissioner Murdered".

The vassal city-state letters to the Pharaoh often reference the King (Pharaoh), as: "King, Lord-mine", where king is represented by LUGAL (king Sumerogram), for Akkadian language šarru-(sometimes LUGAL-ri, represented as "ŠÁR-ri", for king, ŠÁR=LUGAL). For the reverse of EA 362, Rib-Hadda to Pharaoh (plus lines 66–69 on clay tablet side), cuneiform sign be is used for "lord", Akkadian "bēlu". In EA 362, be is only used for the spelling of "lord".

The entire topic of EA 362 is developed on the reverse side, (starting halfway on obverse). The listing of be uses, 10-times, on the reverse (and side lines of 66–69), are as follows:

For "King, Lord-mine" (and partials):

(line 32)--LUGAL
(39)--LUGAL be-li-ia
(40)--be-li
(42)--be-li
(46)--LUGAL
(48)--LUGAL be-li

line 51

(51)--ù be-li i-di i-nu-ma

line 51

"And..Lord know, ..now ("now at this time")..."
"And..Lord know, ..[that] "now at this time"..." (a segue to the letter's ending!)

(53)--be-li-ia
(60)--LUGAL be-li-ia
(64)--LUGAL be-li-ia
(65)--LUGAL
(66)--LUGAL be-li
(68)--LUGAL be-li-ia

Besides be in EA 362, bat is used on the letter's obverse (two adjacent lines).

== Form of BAD used in other signs ==
The BAD/BAT sign has been used in other signs:

- With a Gesh2 sign going through it 𒐕: for the Neo-Assyrian Cuneiform sign in Sumerian called MUŠEN, Akkadian: iṣṣūrum meaning bird, and giving the sound of ḪU.
- 𒑙 as numeric value 2: A double BAD (also called double BAT, double ESHE3, or double UŠ2)
- 𒀫 AMAR (unicode 1202B) meaning calf or Mar (the Akkadian word for "son") This sign is the base for many derivatives.
- 𒍘 UŠUM_{X} (unicode u+12358)
- 𒍙 UTUKI, in the suffix, again with a Gesh2 sign going through it.
- 𒆰 KUL
- 𒉄 NAGAR
- 𒑧, 𒑨 Elamite numerical 40 and 50
- Inside various letters like 𒄓, 𒄰, 𒇀
