= Abimilki =

Prince of Tyre

Abimilki (Amorite: 𒇽𒀀𒁉𒅖𒆠, ^{LÚ}a-bi-mil-ki, ʾabī milki; fl. c. 1347 BC) held the rank of Prince of Tyre (called "Surru" in the letters), during the period of the Amarna letters correspondence (1360–1332 BC). He is the author of 10 letters to pharaoh Amenhotep IV, EA 146–155 (EA for 'el Amarna'). In letter EA 147, Amenhotep IV confirmed him as ruler of Tyre upon the death of his father, and in EA 149, referred to him with the rank of rabisu (general).

Abimilki is not referenced by name in any other letters of the 382-letter corpus. His name means "My father (is) king."

== Historical background ==
Following the request of Amenhotep IV to disseminate his political updates in Kinaha, some other city states rebelled against this decision. The background was the vacancy in the position of rabisu in the garrison of Tyre, which Amenhotep IV staffed with non-Egyptians for organizational reasons. Eventually, as in letter EA 149, Amenhotep IV conferred the status of rabisu of Tyre upon Abimilki.

Zimredda of Sidon, and Aziru of Amurru, previously allied with Abimilki, responded by conquering Sumuru and occupying the territories around Tyre. Abimilki advised Amenhotep IV of the dangerous situation in several letters. In letter EA 151 (see here ), Abimilki mentions the Danunans: "Behold, dangerous enemies are besieging Tyre. The king of Danuna is meanwhile dead; his brother now reigns. He behaves peacefully toward me."

Later in the letter, Abimilki warns of the rebels: "Behold, the fort of Tyre is running out of fresh water and wood. I will send you Ilu-milku as a messenger. At present there are no Hittite troops, but Aitakama of Kadesh is together with Aziru in battle against Biryawaza of Damascus. Meanwhile, Zimredda has been reinforced with troops and ships from Aziru; he has besieged me, and it is very dangerous.

== Abimilki's letters ==
The titles of Abimilki's letters are as follows:

EA 146: "Abimilki of Tyre"
EA 147: "A Hymn to the Pharaoh"
EA 148: "The Need of Mainland Tyre"
EA 149: "Neither Water nor Wood" (See Haapi)
EA 150: "Needed: Just One Soldier"
EA 151: "A Report on Canaan" (See external links:letter and Sea Peoples)
EA 152: "A Demand for Recognition"
EA 153: "Ships on Hold"
EA 154: "Orders Carried Out" (See Zimredda (Sidon mayor))
EA 155: "Servant of Mayati" ("Mayati" is a hypocoristicon for Meritaten, Akhenaten's daughter)

== Example letters of Abimilki ==
=== EA 147, "A Hymn to the Pharaoh" ===
The topic of "A Hymn to the Pharaoh" is not Zimredda; however, the war of Aziru son or Abdi-Ashirta, the constant lookout, and reporting by Zimredda is addressed at the very end of this letter.

To the king, my lord, my god, my sun: a message from Abimilki, your servant.

I fall at the feet of the king, my lord. My lord is the sun—who comes forth over all lands day by day according to the way of the sun, his gracious father; who gives life by his sweet breath and returns with his north wind; who establishes the entire land in peace by the power of his arm; and who gives forth his cry in the sky like Baal. All the land is frightened at his cry!

The servant herewith writes to his lord that he heard the gracious messenger of the king who came to his servant, and the sweet breath that came forth from the mouth of the king, my lord to his servant—his breath came back! Before the arrival of the messenger of the king, my lord, breath had not come back; my nose was blocked. Now that the breath of the king has come forth to me, I am very happy, and he is satisfied day by day. Because I am happy, does the earth not pr[osp]er? When I heard the gracious me[ss]enger from my lord, all the land was in fear of my lord—when I heard the sweet breath, and the gracious messenger who came to me.

When the king, my lord, said, "Prepare before the arrival of a large army," then the servant said to his lord, "Yes, yes, yes!" On my front and on my back I carry the word of the king, my lord. Whoever gives heed to the king, his lord, and serves him in his place, the sun com[e]s forth over him, and the sweet breath comes back from the mouth of his lord. If he does not heed the word of the king, his lord, his city is destroyed, his house is destroyed, never [again] does his name exist in all the land. Look at the servant who gives heed to his lord: His city prospers, his house prospers, his name exists forever. You are the sun who comes forth over me and a brazen wall set up for him, and because of the powerful arm I am at rest, I am confident. Indeed, I said to the sun, the father of the king, my lord, "When shall I see the face of the king, my lord?"

I am indeed guarding Tyre, the principal city, for the king, my lord, until the powerful arm of the king comes forth over me, to give me water to drink and wood to warm myself. Moreover, Zimredda, the king of Sidon, writes daily to the rebel Aziru, the son of Abdi-Ashirta, about every word he has heard from Egypt. I herewith write to my lord, as it is good that he knows.

— EA 147, lines 1–71 (complete)

The photo of the external links shows the condition of EA 147, (minus a corner).

See: phrases and quotations. Instead of "seven times and seb times", in 147 the scribe goes far deeper, using "one half of seven times". A partial reference to the prostration formula may be used in the letter middle, when he uses "on my front and on my back".

Zimredda of Sidon is the topic of five of Abimilki's ten letters.

=== EA 148, "The Need of Mainland Tyre" ===
Abimilki of Tyre has sent his tribute to Pharaoh who appointed him, and he requests of Pharaoh ten foot soldiers for protection, since his own men have been taken by the king of Sidon. He also mentions that the king of Hazor has gone over to the enemy, the Habiru who are taking over Canaan.

=== EA 149, "Neither Water nor Wood" ===
See: Egyptian commissioner Haapi.

=== EA 151, "A Report on Canaan" ===
See: external link article/write-up.

=== EA 154, "Orders Carried Out" ===
Five of Abimilki's letters concern his neighbor and conflict enemy Zimredda of Sidon. See: Zimredda (Sidon mayor).

=== EA 153, "Ships on Hold" ===
See picture: EA 153 (Obverse)

[To] the king, my lord: a [mes]sage from Abimilki, your servant.

I fall at your feet seven times and seven times. I have carried out what the king, my lord, ordered—the entire land is afraid of the troops of the king, my lord: I have had my men hold ships at the disposition of troops of the king, my lord.

Whoever has disobeyed has no family, has nothing living. Since I gua[rd the ci]ty of the king, [my] lo[rd], m[y] s[afety] is the king's responsibility. [May he take cognizance] of his servant, who is on his side.

— EA 153, 1–20 (complete but damaged)

== See also ==
- Haapi, Egyptian commissioner
