= Ili-Rapih =

Canaanite ruler

Ili-Rapih was the follow-on mayor in Gubla-(modern Byblos), and the brother of Rib-Hadda, the former mayor of Gubla, (who was the prolific author of letters to pharaoh); Ili-Rapih is in the 1350-1335 BC Amarna letters correspondence, and wrote 2 follow-on letters to the Pharaoh after the death of Rib-Haddi.

Of note, Ili-Rapih's name is referenced in only one letter in the entire Amarna letters corpus, besides his own 2 authored letters of EA 139, and 140, (EA is for 'el Amarna'), that being letter EA 128, (Rib-Haddi letter no. 57 of 68).

== The letters of Ili-Rapih ==
=== EA 139, title: "A new voice, an old story" ===
To the king, [my] lo[rd, my Sun]: Message of Ili-ra[pih, your servant]; message of Gu(b)la, [your maidservant. I fall at] the feet of the lord, the Sun, 7 times and [7 times]. Do not neglec[t Gu-la, your city and the city of [your] ancesto[rs] from most ancient times. Moreover, behold Gu-la! Just as Hikuptah, so is Gu-la to the king, my lord. Do not neglect the delicts of a serva[nt], for he acted as he pleased in the lands of the king-(i.e. the "king's" brother: Rib-Hadda). Here is the crime that Aziru ... against the king: [he kill]ed the king of Ammiya, and [the king of E]ldata-(Ardata), and the king of Ir(qata)-(="King Aduna"), [and a co]mmissioner of the king, my lord. He also broke into Sumur.
[And indeed] he is now intent on [committing] a cri(me) against the king. Moreover, ... ...May the king (my) lord, know [I] am his loyal servant. And so let him send a garrison to his city—30 to 50 men— as far as Gubla. The king is to take (n)o account of whatever Aziru sends him. Where were the things that he sends coveted? It is property belonging to a royal whom he has killed that he sends to you. Look, Aziru is a reb(el) against the king, my lord. -EA 139, lines 1- 40 (complete, but major lacuna: lines 20-28)

Note that Gubla's name is abbreviated in this letter, (Gu-la), except for one usage.

=== EA 140, title: "Again, the crimes of Aziru"; letter Part 1 of 2-(lost) ===
[To] the king, the lord, my Sun: Message of Gubla), your maidservant; message of Ili-rapih, your servant. I fall at the feet of my lord, the Sun, 7 times and 7 times. The king, my lord, shall not neglect Gubla, his maidservant, a city of the king from most ancient times. Moreover why did the king communicate through Aziru? He does as he pleases. Aziru killed Aduna, and a magnate. He took their cities. To him belongs Sumur-(Zemar); to him belong the cities of the king. Gubla alone is a ... of the king. Moreover, he broke into Sumur and Ullassa. Moreover, Aziru even [com]mitted a crime [wh]en he was brought [in]to you-(i.e. over-to you, (in Egypt)). The crime [was against] us. He sent [his] men [t]o Itakkama [and] he smote all the land of Amqu and (their) territories. Moreover, is not the king of Hatta active, and the king of Narima-(Mittani) and..? (lacuna-- continuation to 2nd letter, (Letter 2 lost) -EA 140, lines 1-33 (complete)—(Letter: Part 1 of 2 parts)

=== EA 128, title: No title, since badly damaged ===
Letter EA 128, no. 57 of 68, by Rib-Hadda-(?) of Gubla/Byblos. A postscript ending on letter no. 128 exists:

...Message of Ili-rapih: I fall 7 times and 7 times beneath the feet of the king, my lord. And may the king, my lord, hear about the deed of (that) criminal-(Aziru(?)) ... -EA 128, ending, (these are postscript lines on the damaged letter)

== See also ==
- Rib-Hadda
- Gubla/Byblos
- Amarna letters
- Amarna letters–localities and their rulers
