= Pihuri =

Pakhura (Pihu) was an Egyptian commissioner in the "Land of Retenu" (Canaan) mentioned in the Amarna letters. He probably served under Pharaoh Amenhotep III and/or Akhenaten. In EA 122, Rib-Hadda, king of Byblos, complained of an attack by Pakhura, who killed a number of Byblos' Shardana mercenaries and took captive three of Rib-Hadda's men.
