= Maryannu =

Caste of Near Eastern warrior nobility in the Bronze Age

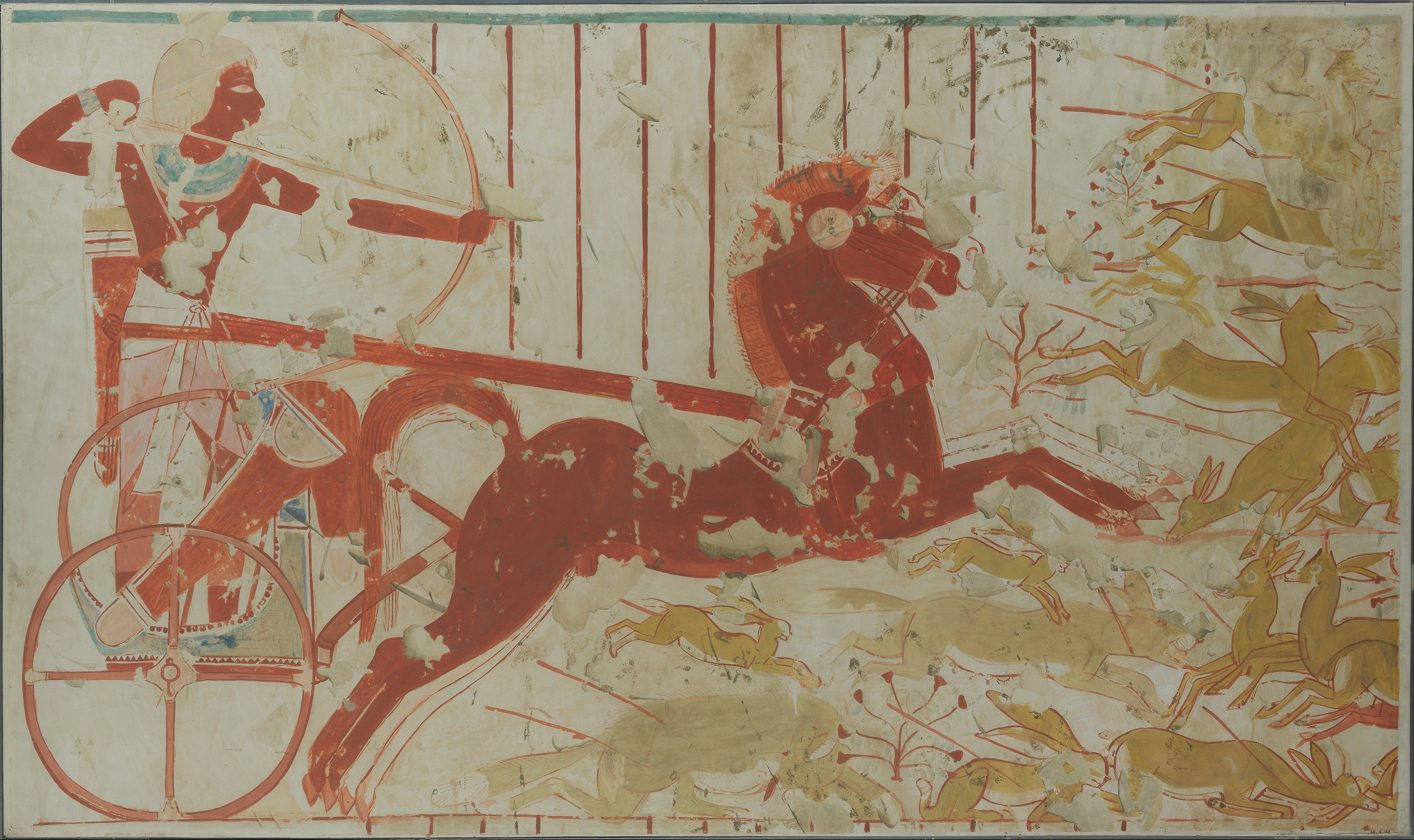
Possible Maryannu from the Tomb of Userhet

The Maryannu were a caste of chariot-mounted hereditary warrior nobility that existed in many of the societies of the Ancient Near East during the Bronze Age, in particular between 1700 and 1200 BC. Maryannu is a Hurrianized Indo-Aryan word, formed by adding the Hurrian suffix -nni to the Indo-Aryan root márya, meaning "(young) man" or a "young warrior". Philologist Martin West suggested that the name Meriones, a character in Homeric epic, is "identical" to maryannu. Thus, Mērionēs would be the Homeric Greek version of the term, reflected in pre-Mycenaean poetic verse as Mārionās.

The term is attested in the Amarna letters written by Haapi. The majority of the Maryannu had Semitic and Hurrian names.

== See also ==
- Late Bronze Age collapse: Warfare
- Indo-Aryan superstrate in Mitanni
