= Zimredda of Sidon =

King of Sidon in the 14th century BC

Zimredda

King of Sidon
- Reign: c. 1340 BC

Zimredda (Zimri-Haddu, Zimr-Edda or Zimr-Eddi, Akkadian: 𒍣𒅎𒊑𒁕 Zîmreda; Amorite: *ḏimrī hadda, "Hadad is my protection"; fl. c. 1340 BC) was the king of Sidon in the mid 14th century BC. He is mentioned in several of the Amarna letters, in the late Rib-Hadda series, and later. He authored letters EA 144–45 (EA for 'el Amarna').

Zimredda of Siduna-Sidon, is the only king of Sidon in the 1350–1335 BC Amarna letters correspondence, (15–20 year) time period.

Zimredda of Sidon's name is referenced in 10 Amarna letters, with three from the Rib-Hadda series-(+Rib-Hadda EA 92, entitled: "Some help from the Pharaoh"-(calling mayors to assist Rib-Hadda), as the "King of Siduna"), five from Abimilku of Tyre, also his own letters. (He is the major subject of half of Abimilku's letters to pharaoh.)

The Abimilku letters reference Zimredda of Siduna as one of his major enemies in the groups against Abimilku.

== Zimredda of Siduna: his two letters ==
=== EA 144: "Zimreddi of Siduna" ===
A letter written to the pharaoh.

Say to the king, my lord, my god, my Sun, the breath of my life: Thus Zimreddi, the mayor of Siduna. I fall at the feet of my lord, god, Sun, breath of my life, ((at the feet of my lord, my god, my Sun, the breath of my life))-(emphasis(?)), 7 times and 7 times. May the king, my lord, know that Siduna-(Sidon), the maidservant of the king, my lord, which he put in my charge, is safe and sound. And when I heard the words of the king, my lord, when he wrote to his servant, then my heart rejoiced, and my head went [h]igh, and my eyes shone, at hearing the words of the king, my lord. May the king know that I have made preparations before the arrival of the archers of the king, my lord. I have prepared everything in accordance with the command of the king, my lord.
May the king, my lord, know that the war against me is very severe. All the cit[i]es that the king put in [m]y ch[ar]ge, have been joined to the 'Apiru-(Habiru). May the king put me in the charge of a man that will lead the archers of the king to call to account the cities that have been joined to the 'Apiru, so you can restore them to my charge that I may be able to serve the king, my lord, as our ancestors before (did before). —EA 144, lines 1–30 (complete)

(See: the Prostration formula)

=== EA 145: "Word on Amurru" ===
A letter written to someone, in the pharaoh's charge.

[Sa]y [to ...] ... [my lord: Message of Z]imre[ddi]. I fall [at (your) fee]t. [May] you know that I am safe and sound, and with your greeting from the presence of the king, my lord, you–yourself brought back to me the breath of his mouth. I have heard your words that you sent me through ... [...] The war is very severe. [...] ...The king, our lord, has indeed been ea[rnestly ad]dressed from his lands, but the breath of his mouth does not reach his servants that are in the hinterlands-(countryside). Moreover, as to your ordering with regard to the land of Amurru, "The word you hear from ther[e],—you must report to me," everyone [has] heard (that) [...] ....: ia-ak-wu-un-ka (he awaits you). —EA 145, lines 1–29 (with lacunae)

== EA 154, no. 9 of 10 of Abimilku ==
This damaged letter is the 5th letter of Abimilku which discusses the affairs of Zimredda: ('ruler of Siduna'). His name appears in the end-lines damaged lacuna. He is also referenced as the "ruler of Siduna", line 14.

=== EA 154: "Orders carried out" ===
To the king, my lord: Message of Abimilku, [your] servant. I fall at the feet of the king, [m]y lo[rd], 7 times and 7 times. I am the d[i]rt un(der) the sandals of the king, my lord. I have heard what the king wrote to his servant, "Let my forces: [.ia-k]u-(un) (be prepar(ed)) again[st] Yawa." What the king ordered, that I have carried out with the greatest joy. Moreover, since the departure of the troops of the king, my lord, from me, the ruler of Siduna does not allow me or my people to go to land to fetch wood or to fetch water for drinking. He has killed one man, and he has capt[ured] another. [ ... 8–line lacuna ]. May the king take cognizance of his servant. —EA 154, lines 1–20, and line 29 (lines 21–28, a lacuna)

== See also ==
- Amarna letter EA 144
- Zimredda (Lachish mayor)
- Abimilku, mayor of Surru-(Tyre)
- Rib-Hadda, mayor of Gubla-(Byblos)
- Amarna letters–localities and their rulers
