= Amarna letter EA 362 =

Ancient clay tablet

Amarna letter EA 362 (Titled: A Commissioner Murdered)
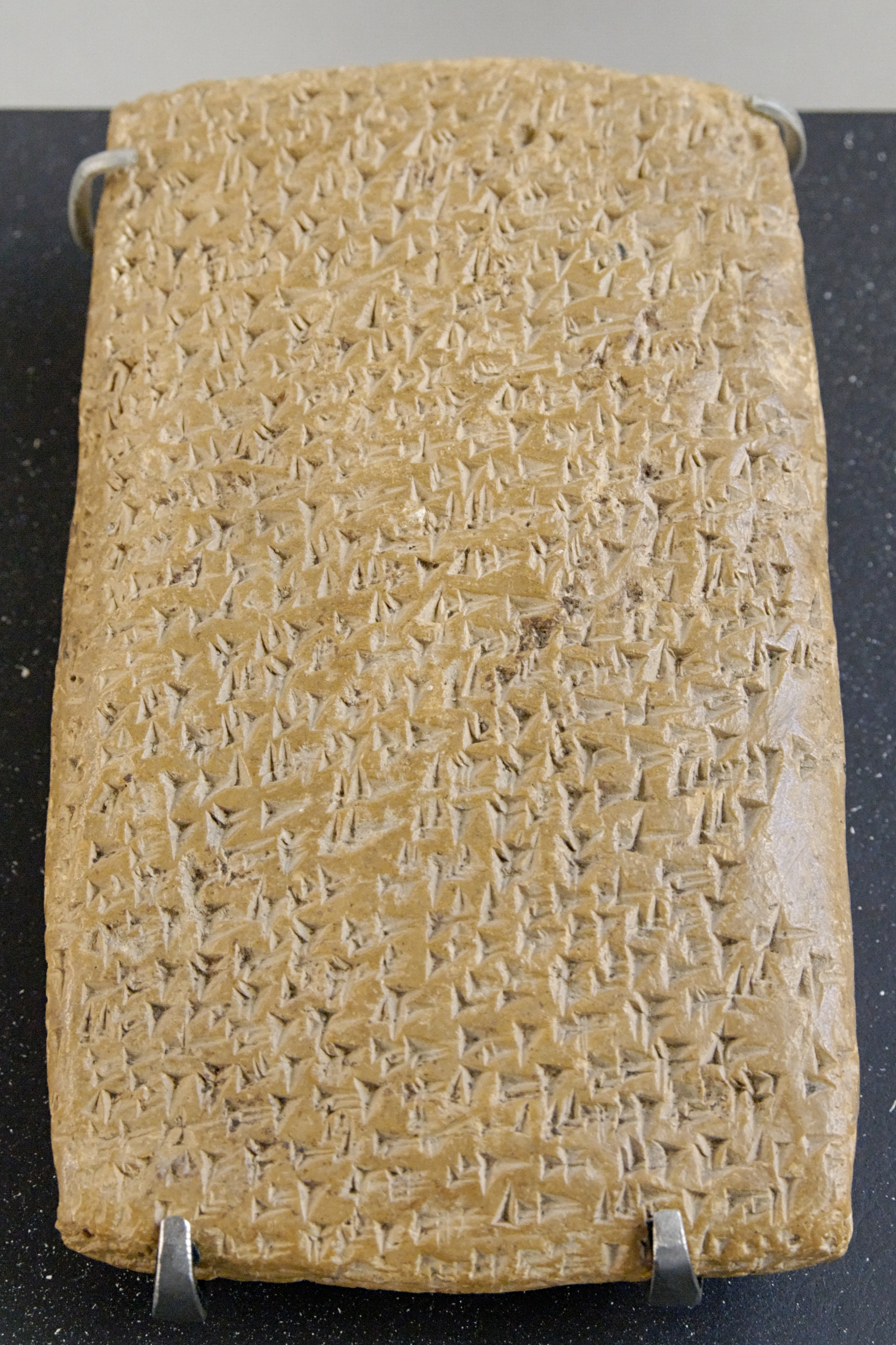
- Reverse; Rib-Haddi letter to Pharaoh
- Material: Clay
- Writing: cuneiform (Akkadian language)
- Created: ~1350-1335 BC (Amarna Period)
- Period/culture: Middle Babylonian
- Place: Akhetaten
- Present location: Louvre (Antiquités orientales AO 7093)

Amarna letter EA 362, titled: "A Commissioner Murdered," is a finely-inscribed clay tablet letter from Rib-Haddi, the mayor/'man' of the city of Byblos, (Gubla of the letters). Byblos, being a large coastal seaport Mediterranean city, was a city that was aligned with Egypt (Miṣri), and housed an Egyptian community. Rib-Haddi, as the city-state leader wrote the largest number of letters to the Pharaoh, in a sub-corpus of the 1350 BC Amarna letters (about 70 letters).

Near the end of his rule, Rib-Haddi penned two large diplomatic letters summarizing conditions of his hostilities with peoples like the Hapiru, but also other city-state rulers, vying for regional ascendency. Letter EA 362 relates the hostilities, but also talks of disease, upon his land. The letter ends addressing the fate of Egypt's commissioner Pawura.

The Amarna letters, about 300, numbered up to EA 382, are a mid 14th century BC, about 1350 BC and 20–25 years later, correspondence. The initial corpus of letters were found at Akhenaten's city Akhetaten, in the floor of the Bureau of Correspondence of Pharaoh; others were later found, adding to the body of letters.

Letter EA 362 is numbered AO 7093, from the Louvre, in France.

== The letter ==
=== EA 362: "A Reckoning Demanded" ===
EA 362, a letter by Rib-Haddi to Pharaoh, 1 of approximately 70 letters in the Rib-Haddi sub-corpus of the Amarna letters. (Not a linear, line-by-line translation, and English from French.)

Obverse: Photo, see here:

(Lines 1-4)--Rib-Haddi. Say to the king, my lord: I fall beneath the feet of my lord 7 times and 7 times.^{1}
(5-11)--I have indeed heard the words of the king, my lord, and my heart is overjoyed. May my lord hasten the sending of the archers with all speed. If the king, my lord, does not send archers, then we ourselves must die and
(12-20)--Gubla^{2} will be taken. He was distraught recently: he is also distraught now.^{3} Recently they were saying, "There will be no archers," but I wrote with the result that archers came out and took their father. (fatherlands?).
(21-30)--Now indeed they are saying, "Let him not write or we will certainly be taken."^{4} They seek to capture Gubla, and they say, "If we capture Gubla, we will be strong;"^{5} there will not be a man left, (and) they (the archers) will certainly be too few for them.^{6}
(31-39)--I for my part have guarded Gubla, the city of the king, "night (and) day".

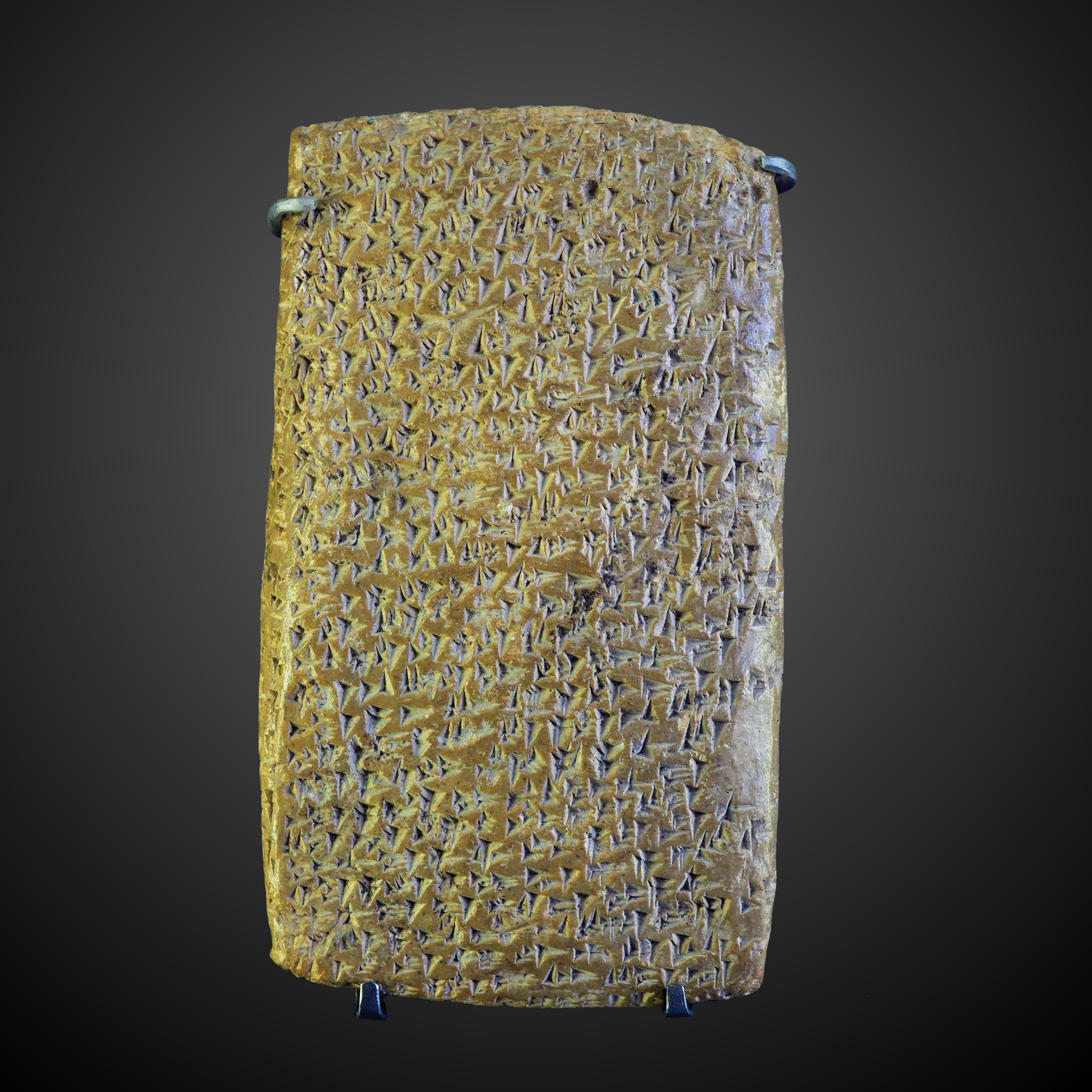
Reverse

Reverse:

Should I move to the (outlying) territory, then the men will desert in order to take territory for themselves,^{7} and there will be no men to guard Gubla, the city of the king, my lord.
(40-50)--So may my lord hasten the archers or we must die. Because my lord has written to me, they know indeed that they are going to die, and so they seek to commit a crime.^{8} As to his having said^{9} before the king, "There is a pestilence in the lands," the king, my lord, should not listen to the words of other men. There is no pestilence in the lands. It has been over for a long t(i)me.^{10}
(51-59)--My lord knows that I do not write lies to my lord. All the mayors are not in favor of the archers' coming out, for they have peace. I am the one who wants them to come out, for I have distress (i.e. discord).
(60-65)--May the king, my lord, come out, for I have distress. Look, the day you come out, all the lands will be (re)joined to the king, my lord. Who will resist the troops of the king?

Side:

(66-69)--May the king, my lord, not leave this year free for the sons of Abdi-Aširta, for you know all their acts of hatred^{11} against the lands of the king. Who are they that they have committed a crime and killed the commissioner: sú-ki-na, (Prefect)-Pewure?--(complete Obverse & Reverse, EA 362)

== Akkadian text ==
The Akkadian language text: Note; the Akkadian language text, is mostly a running sequential text (with many exceptions for clarity), from Rainey, 1970. But comparison with the Moran, and French, modern times translation, will show the variety, and stressing of different translations.

Akkadian:

Tablet Obverse: see here: Note: -///- represents, a pause, segue, or change in topic.

(Line 1)–{umma(inferred)} [1.]-Rib-Haddi(Rib-^{d}Haddi) qabû–.–({"message"} Rib-Haddi, speaking..!)
(2)–ana Šarru(LUGAL) bēlu-ia–.–.–.–.–(to King-Lord-mine)
(3)–ana šupalu šēpu(pl) bēlu-ia–.–.–.–(at (the) feet, my lord)
(4)–7 ta u 7 maqātu–.–.–.–.–.–.–(seven times and seven,.. I bow.)(?I address you?)
(5)–enūma šemû amatu(pl)–.–.–("Now-(at-this-time)", I hear (the) words)
(6)–šarru, bēlu-ia ù hadû libbu–.–((of) King, my lord, and 'rejoiced'-heart,..)
(7)--magal hamātu bēli--(greatly. -///- "Hotly"(Quickly) Lord)
(8)–uššuru ṣābu(pl) pí-ṭá-ti_{7}–.–.–.–(send(issue) archers with[haste])
(9)–ar-hi-iš šumma Šarru(LUGAL) bēlu-ia–.–(haste!.. -///- (If) King-Lord-mine)
(10)–lā uššuru ṣābu(pl) pí-ṭá-ta_{5}–.–((does) not send archers)
(11)–ù nīnu nimūt–.–.–.–.–(then,.. we die)
(12)–ù ālu(pl) Gubli–.–.–(and (the) cities (of) Byblos(Gubli))
(13)–leqû(tu-ul_{11}-qú-ma) agami–.–((are) taken. -///- ..Today,...)
(14)–tumāl šālšami–.–(yesterday,...(and) "the day before",...)
(15)–magāgu inanna(eninna)–.–.–(it (Byblos) "has been in dire straits". -///- ..Now)
(16)–tumāl šālšami–.–((formerly)-yesterday,...(and) "the day before",...)
(17)–qabû jānu–.–.–.–((they) were saying:.."There Are No"..)
(18)–ṣābu(pl) pí-ṭá-ta_{5} ù šapāru–.–(archer-troops. -///- and. ..I wrote)
(19)–ù aṣu ṣābu(pl) pí-ṭá-tu–.–.–.–( (and)That "to come forth" (the) archers)
(20)–ù leqû 1.(diš)-A-Ba-Šu-Nu(abu-father)–.–(and take 1.-"Father-(Land)-theirs")
(21)–anūma inanna(eninna) qabû–.–.–.–.–("Now-(at-this-time)" ..(Now..) ..(they) say:...)
(22)–lā šapāru(yi-išpāru) ù–.–.–.–.–.–((Let him)-"Don't write.. and(But)-("that"))
(23)–leqû ù anūma–.–.–.–.–.–.–.–.–(we be taken!" ... And,.. now..)
(24)–ba' 'û ṣabātu alāni(URU meš) Gubli–.–(they seek towns Byblos(Gubli))
(25)–ù qabû ṣabātu–.–.–(and they say "(when) We take)
(26)–nīnu alāni(URU meš)–.–.–.–.–(we towns Byblos(Gubli))
(27)–ù danānu amāru–.–.–.–.–.–((and)then,.. we be strong!!"-///-...See)
(28)–ṣabātu šunu alāni(URU meš)–.–(they seized towns Byblos(Gubli))
(29)–ù danānu jānu–.–.–.–.–(and they are strong. -///-There is no)
(30)–amēlu lā aṣu ana šâšu–.–.–(man(people?) not coming against them !!)
(31)–Anūma anāku naṣāru–.–(Now(at this time) I guard)

Tablet Reverse:

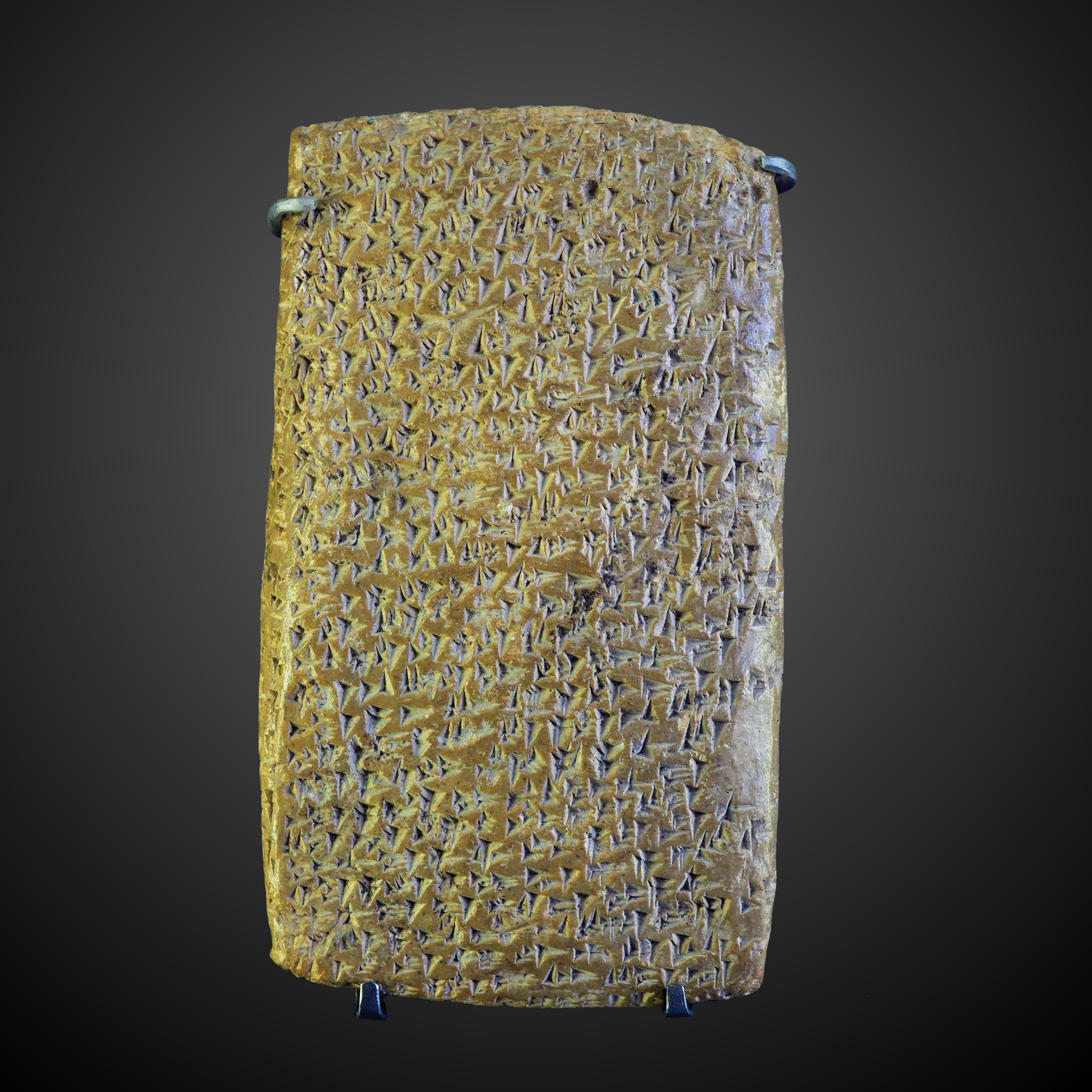
Reverse (very high-resolution expandable photo)

(Line 32)–alāni(URU meš) ālu Šarru(LUGAL)–.–(towns Byblos(Gubli) City (of) King)
(33)–muša /// urru inūma–.–.–.–.–.–.–.–(Night -///- Day -///- -///- Because)
(34)–kašādu mātu(pl)(KÚRKÚRmeš-ki)–.–.–.–("to Desert(to reach)"(i.e. abandon) (my)territories)
(35)– -///- ù paṭaru amēlu–.–.–.–.–.–.–(-///- then men (would) desert)
(36)–ana leqi mātu(pl)(KÚRKÚRmeš)–.–(to take territories)
(37)–ana šašu ù jänu–.–.–.–(for themselves, -///- and there would be no)
(38)–amēlu ana naṣāru ālu(URU ki) šarri(LUGAL) bēlu-ia–.–(men to guard City(Gubli), (of)King-lord-mine.(segue))
(39)–ālu(URU-ki) šarri(LUGAL)–.–.–.–(City (of) King-lord-mine. )
(40)–ù hamātu bēlu-ia&bēlu–.–.–.–.–.–.–("And So" may (the)Lord hasten)
(41)–ṣābu(pl) pí-ṭá-ta_{5} ù "nimut"–.–.(archer-troops or(and) we die. )
(42)–Inūma šaṭāru bēlu–.–.–.–.–.–(Because(Now) (the)Lord wrote)
(43)–ana mahru, ù inūma–.–.–.–.–(to me, ..and now(at this time) )
(44)–ù idu inūma mātu–.–.–.–(and Know .. now(at this time) They Die.(There is dying?) -///- )
(45)–ù ba' 'u epēšu arni–.–.–.–.–(and they seek to perform(commit) (a)crime)
(46)–Inūma qabû ana pānu šarri(LUGAL)–.–.–("Now"(In that) they said "before" (the)King:.. )
(47)–mūtu ana mātāti(KÚRmeš)–.–.–("Death(epidemic) (is) in the Land(Countryside ! -///-)")
(48)–lā šemû šarri(LUGAL) bēlu–.–( -///- (May You) Not Listen, King-Lord)
(49)–amatu(pl) amēlu amēlu šanūB(ša-nu-ti_{7}) jänu(jā-nu-mi)–.–.–( (the)Words(Stories/Reports) (of)Other Men! -///- There is no)
(50)–mūtu ana mātu(KÚRmeš) -///- šalāmu(ša-lim) ištu pānānu–.–(Epidemic(Death) in (the)Territories! -///- (It is Peaceful(Tranquility) since "a long time" !! -///-)
(51)–- ///- Ù bēlu idu inūma–.–.–.–.–(And (The)King knows, Now (at this time) )
(52)–lā šapāru amatu(a-ma-at) bēlu-ia–.–.–( (I) not write words(Reports) Lord-mine)
(53)–kazbūtu ana bēlu-ia–.–.–.–.–.–( (of)Falsehood to Lord-mine !! )
(54)–ù gabbu awiluti (LÚ-meš) hazzanu–.–.–( And all "City-Rulers" )
(55)–lā ra'āmu inūma–.–.–.–.–.–.–.–("do not" like(love) (it) that)
(56)–aṣû ṣābu(pl) pí-ṭá-tu–.–.–.–.–.–("come-forth"(emerge) (the) archer-force, -///- )
(57)–inūma pašāhu ana šunu–.–(Since(and) "it is tranquil(relief)" for them ! -///-)
(58)–ù anāku ba'u aṣû–.–.–.–.–(But(and) I seek (their) "coming forth" )
(59)–inūma marāṣu iāši–.–.–(because(since) "events/things"(i.e. warfare) are grievous(ill, painful) for me !! )
(60)–Ù aṣû aṣû šarri(LUGAL) bēlu-ia amāru–.–(And "may (the) coming forth" King-Lord-mine he see)
(61)–mātu(pl)-šu(KÚR-meš-šu) ù leqû gabbu–.–.–( Lands-his, -///- "and that" (he) Retake All (Lands) ! )
(62)–Amāru ana ūmuA aṣû–.–.–( -//- See, for the day "coming forth" )
(63)–ù epēšu gabbu–.–.–(then(and) "will be turned back" all... )
(64)–mātu(pl)(KÚRKÚRmeš) ana šarri(LUGAL) bēlu-ia–.–(Lands to King-Lord-mine ! -//- )
segue
(65)–Mija uzuzzu ana pānu ṣābu(pl) pí-ṭá-tu šarri(LUGAL)–.–( Who "can stand(resist)" before (the)Archer-Troops,.. King ? )

( major segue to tablet side )

Side:

(66)–Lā muššuru šarri(LUGAL) bēlu šattu(MU) šanû šanita(m) annû–.–(Not sending(issuing) King-Lord "year-another-this" )
(67)–ana mārī(DUMUmeš) Abdi-Ashirta ù idû mārū(DUMUmeš)–.–("Towards"(against) (the)Sons (of) Abdi-Ashirta,.. Then(And then) Know (the) Sons )
(68)–(All of them within the Territories of King-Lord-mine,.. -///- Who (are) they )
(69)–(now (at this time) make (commit) crime,.. -///- Or(and) kill commissioner Pawura ? !! )

== Cuneiform score, Akkadian, English ==
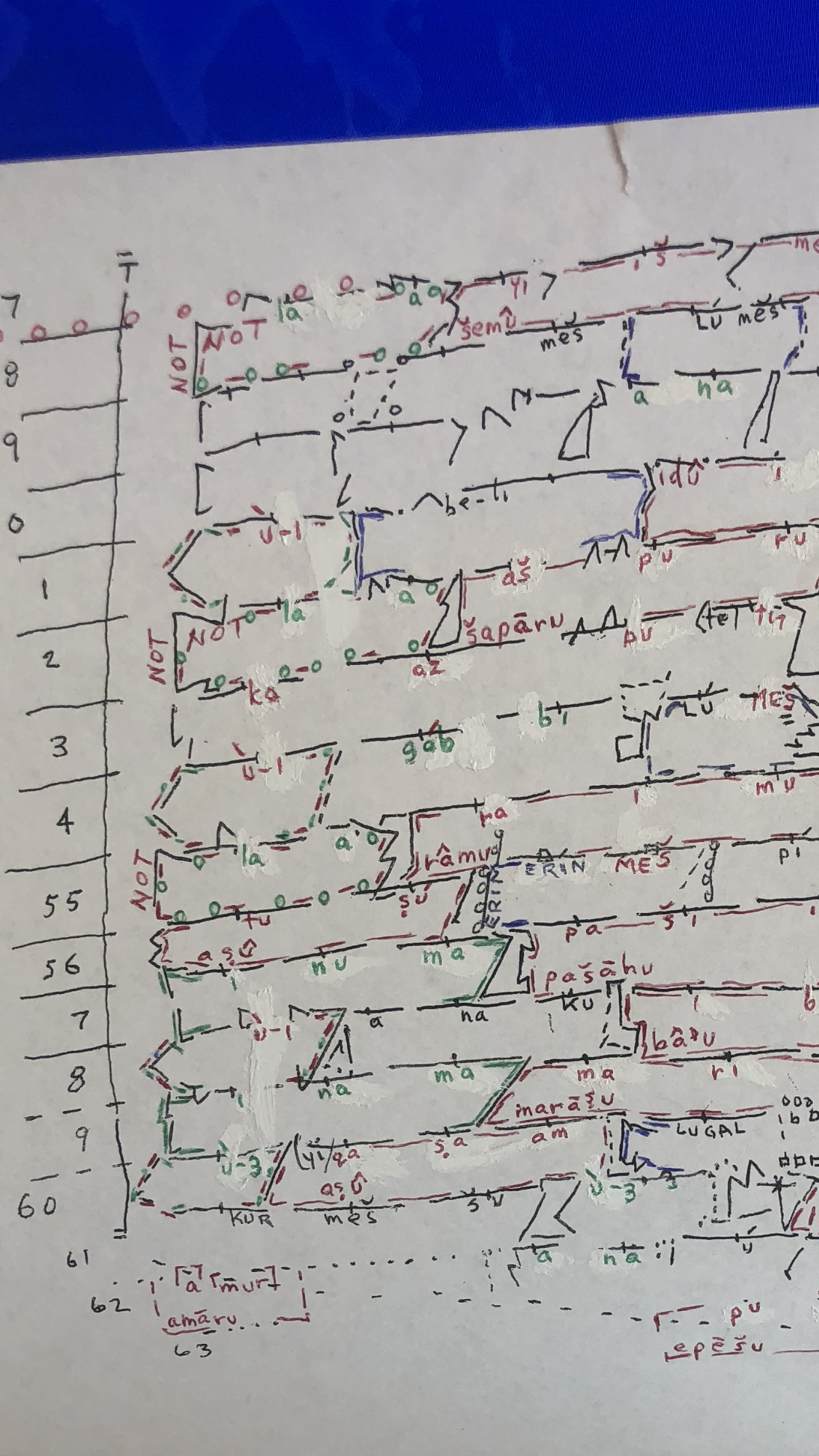
EA 362, Reverse, lines 47-62, Start, & End of lines.

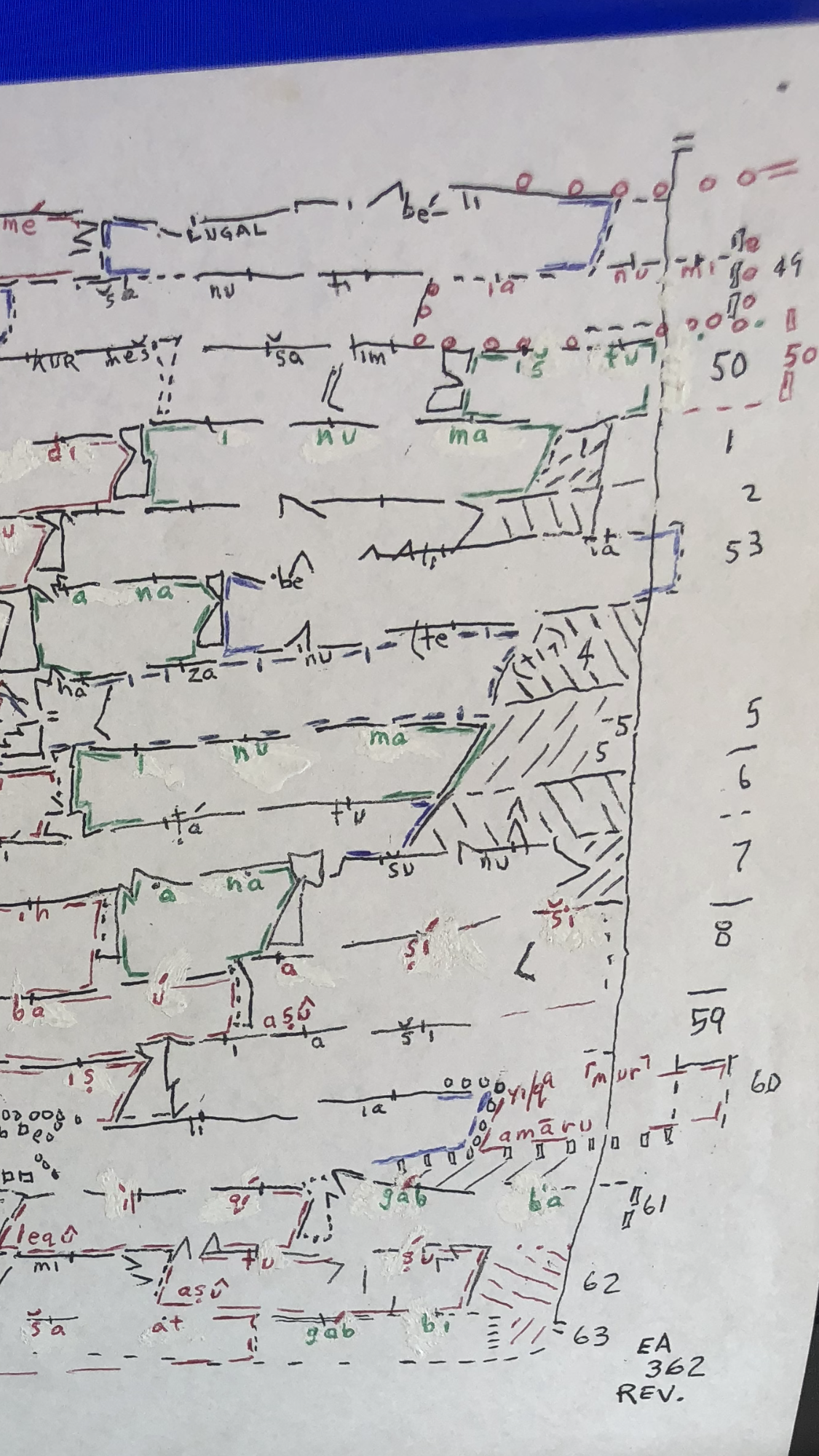
EA 362, Reverse, lines 47-62, Start, & End of lines.

Cuneiform score (per CDLI, Chicago Digital Library Initiative), and Akkadian, and English.

54.ù gab-bi _lú-meš_ ha-za-nu-ti_{7}
___u gabbu ^{lú-meš}Ha-za-nu-ti_{7}
___and all ^{lú-meš}Hazzanuti (City-state-governors)
55.la-a ra-i-mu i-nu-ma
___lā ra'āmu inūma
___("do not" like(love) (it) that), —
55.6-----------i-nu-ma
___--------------inūma
___--------------now (at this time)
56.tu-ṣú _ERIM-meš_ pí-ṭá-tu
___aṣû, – ṣābu(pl) pí-ṭá-tu
___(the) "coming-forth", – (the) Amarna letter archer force-(Pítati archers)
57.i-nu-ma pa-ši-ih a-na šu-nu
___inūma, – pašāhu ana šunu
___Since, – tranquil for them
58.ù a-na-ku i-ba-ú a-ṣé-ši
___u, — anāku ba'u aṣû
___But, — I seek (their) "coming forth"

== See also ==
- Rib-Hadda
- Byblos
- Archers (Egyptian pitati)
- Amarna letters–phrases and quotations
- List of Amarna letters by size
  - Amarna letter EA 5, EA 9, EA 15, EA 19, EA 26, EA 27, EA 35, EA 38
  - EA 153, EA 161, EA 288, EA 364, EA 365, EA 367
