= Ammunira =

Ancient king of Beirut

King of Biruta
- Reign: c. 1350 BC

Ammunira (fl. c. 1350 BC) was a king of Biruta. He is mentioned in several of the Amarna letters, and authored letters EA 141-43 (EA for 'el Amarna').
