= Amurru kingdom =

Ancient Levantine state

Coordinates: 34°34′11″N 36°13′55″E

Amurru Amurru (𒈥𒌅𒆠)
- c. 2000 BCE–c. 1200 BCE
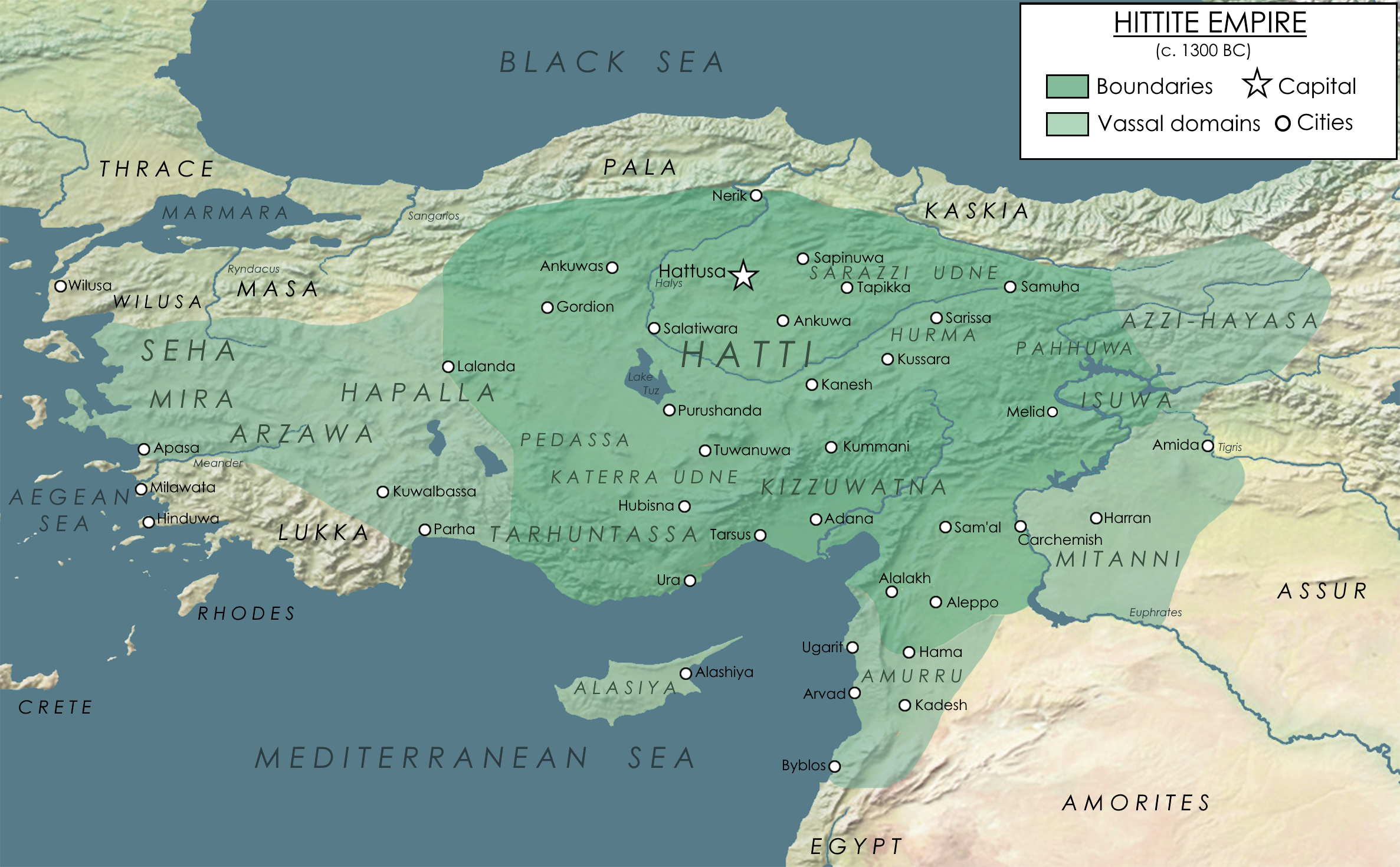
- Map showing the borders of Amurru as a vassal state of the Hittites
- Capital: Sumur
- Religion: Ancient Levantine religion
- Government: Monarchy
  - c. 14th century BC: Abdi-Ashirta
  - c. 14th century BC: Aziru
- Historical era: Bronze Age
  - Established: c. 2000 BCE
  - Disestablished: c. 1200 BCE
- Today part of: Syria; Lebanon

Amurru (Sumerian: 𒈥𒌅𒆠 MAR.TU^{KI}; Akkadian: 𒀀𒈬𒌨𒊏 Amûrra, 𒀀𒈬𒊑 Amuri, 𒀀𒄯𒊑 Amurri) was a kingdom in the Levant known for its role in early Bronze Age trade and cultural development. Amurru occupied the Akkar plains in modern Lebanon. Its southern boundary was near Byblos; its eastern and northern boundaries were the Homs Gap and Tartus in modern Syria.

== History ==
The inhabitants spoke the Amorite language, an extinct early Northwest Semitic language classified as a westernmost or Amorite-specific dialect of Ugaritic.

The kingdom shares a name with the eponymous god Amurru. However, the exact relationship between the two is unclear, as the god Amurru functioned as the divine personification of the Amorites and their stereotypes for the inhabitants of Mesopotamia and was not an Amorite god.

Amurru was first mentioned in the third millennium BCE as a geographical designation for the west from Mesopotamia (Sumer, Akkad and Assyria). Texts from Ebla also refer to a place spelled Mar-tu, with sources in the 24th century BCE mentioning a king of Mar-tu. The name Amurru appears in the Old Assyrian period as a geographical designation, often with the divine determinative prefix, bearing similarities to how the god Assur and the city of Assur freely interchange in Old Assyrian texts. The Mari archives also mention Amurru, which may have been the name of a federation. Eventually, following the expansion of Egypt into Syria, Amurru became a well-defined geopolitical unit between the Middle Orontes and the central Levantine coast.

=== Abdi-Ashirta ===
Detailed documentation about the Kingdom of Amurru mainly comes from sources from Egypt and Ugarit. The first documented leader of Amurru was Abdi-Ashirta in the 14th century BCE, who united the Habiru and brought much of Amurru under his sway through conquest. This prompted Rib-Hadda, the king of Gubla (Byblos), to send a series of letters to Amenhotep III asking for intervention. Rib-Hadda also claimed that Abdi-Ashirta was conspiring with the king of Mitanni. However, this was likely made up to garner support from Egypt. Meanwhile, Abdi-Ashirta styled himself as the governor of Amurru guarding Egyptian interests, perhaps because Egypt did not recognize Amurru as a legitimate state. After Abdi-Ashirta’s death, Sumur, an Egyptian stronghold in the area, was captured by Abdi-Ashirta's sons.

=== Aziru ===
Abdi-Ashirta' successor, Aziru, continued to stylize himself as the governor of Amurru for Egypt. Aziru also sent to Egypt a series of letters, the chronology of which is highly debated. During his reign Akhenaten repeatedly asked for his personal presence in Egypt, which he repeatedly delayed, citing Hittite presence in Nuhasse and fear of Hittite action against Amurru. Aziru's messengers to the Egyptian court were repeatedly detained or delayed, and soon Aziru himself, finally departing to Egypt, was detained as well, with rumors circulating that he was never going to get out of Egypt. Eventually, Aziru returned to Amurru, and soon defected to the Hittite King Suppiluliuma I. Around this time, Aziru signed a treaty with Niqmaddu, the king of Ugarit.

=== Benteshina ===
Seti I, the second pharaoh of Egypt's Nineteenth Dynasty, aimed to restore Egyptian authority over the southern Levant, launched a military campaign and brought Kadesh and Amurru back under Egypt's sphere of influence. Amurru later participated in the Battle of Kadesh on the side of the Egyptians. After the battle of Kadesh, Amurru was brought back to the Hittite fold by Muwatalli II, where King Benteshina was held responsible for the revolt and removed from the throne and was subsequently replaced by Shapili. However, Benteshina may not have had much of a choice when he surrendered to the Egyptian side. Later, under Urhi-Teshub, Benteshina was restored to the throne of Amurru presumably with the support of Urhi-Teshub’s uncle, Hattusili III, as he later took credit for the move. Hattusili also promised Benteshina that, despite the past rebellion and resubjugation by the Hittite forces, he would continue to enjoy the terms granted to Aziru and was ensured that his successors would retain the throne. A similar treaty was made for Shaushgamuwa by Tudhaliya IV, who also stressed loyalty and allegiance, perhaps due to feeling insecure about his throne and life since his father, Hattusili, was a usurper. In addition, Shaushgamuwa was supposed to enforce a trade ban with the increasingly powerful Middle Assyrian Empire, as Assyria and Hatti were at war.

=== Shaushgamuwa ===
Perhaps the most well known incident from Shaushgamuwa's reign was the divorce between his sister and Ammistamru II, the king of Ugarit. The case involved Tudhaliya himself and the Ini-Teshub, the king of Carchemish (long established Hittite cadet branch in Syria), who were both related to Shaushgamuwa's sister due to intermarriage between the Hittite and Amurrite royal family. Ammistamru never specified what her exact crime was, only saying that she stirred trouble and intended to cause harm. The divorce was eventually settled and she returned to Amurru with her original dowry. However, Ammistamru later demanded her extradition to Ugarit, which involved the intervention of both the Hittite King and the King of Carchemish. Her extradition was decided and compensation for Shaushgamuwa was decided on 1400 gold shekels.

References to the Kingdom of Amurru disappeared along with the Hittite Empire, Ugarit, and Amurru during the Bronze Age Collapse circa 1200 BC. with the Middle Assyrian Empire annexing much of the Hittite Empire in Anatolia and Levant and the Phrygians sacking Hattarsus. The term Amurru continued to be used in Assyrian and Babylonian annals as a geographical designation for both the west in general and to the more specific area where the Kingdom of Amurru once was.
