= Aziru =

Ruler of Amurru

- King of Amurru; Vassal of Suppiluliuma I of Hatti
- Reign: c. 35 regnal years c. 1350~1315 BC
- Predecessor: Abdi-Ashirta
- Successor: DU-Tessup

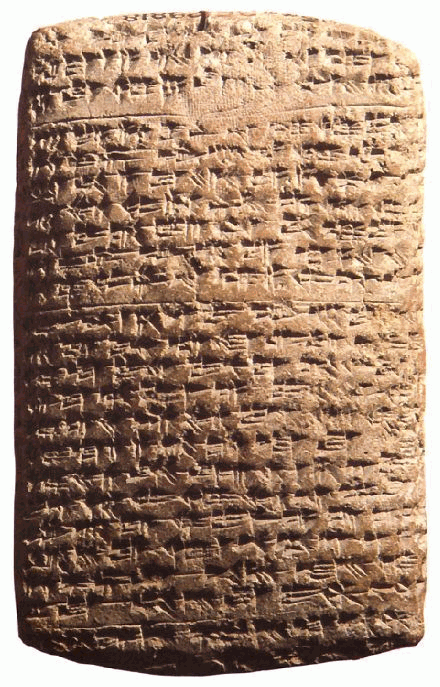
Amarna letter EA 161, Aziru to Pharaoh, "An Absence Explained." (British Museum no. 29818, painted in black on top of letter, visible)

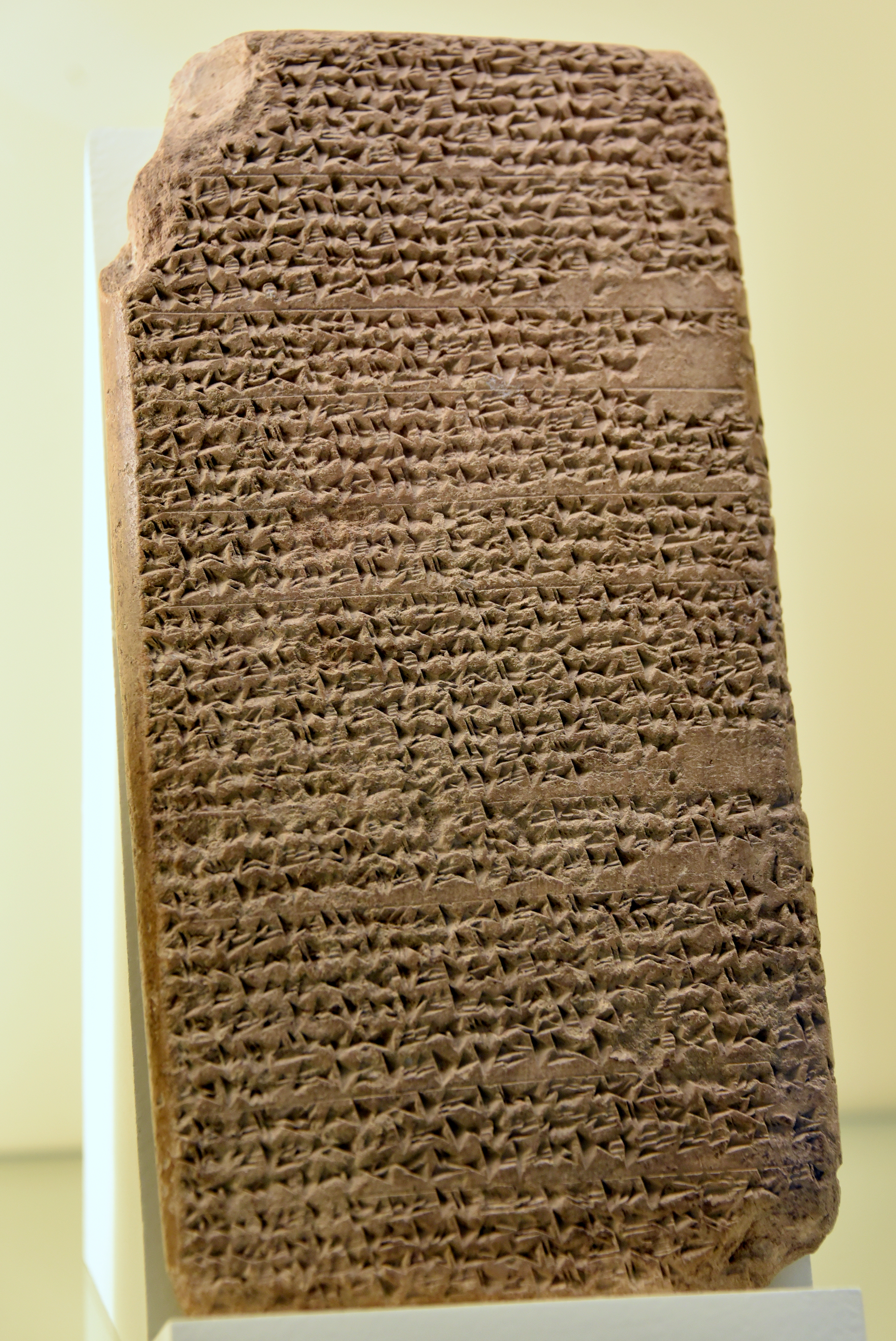
A letter from the Pharaoh of Egypt Akhenaten to Aziru prince of Amurru. Circa 1350 BCE. From Tell el-Amarna, Egypt. Vorderasiatisches Museum, Berlin

Aziru (Akkadian: ^{m}a-zi-ra) was the Canaanite ruler of Amurru, modern Lebanon, in the 14th century BC. He was the son of Abdi-Ashirta, the previous Egyptian vassal of Amurru and a direct contemporary of Akhenaten.

== Family ==
Aziru was the son and successor of Abdi-Ashirta, the founder of the Kingdom of Amurru. He was the father of DU-Teššup.

== Reign ==
Aziru was a petty king of the Land of Amurru, a vassal of Suppiluliuma I, Arnuwanda II and Mursili II. He changed his allegiance to Suppiluliuma I around 1350-1345 BCE, and was still alive in Year 7 of Mursili II (c. 1315 BCE), when neigboring provinces rebelled.

=== Relations with Egypt ===
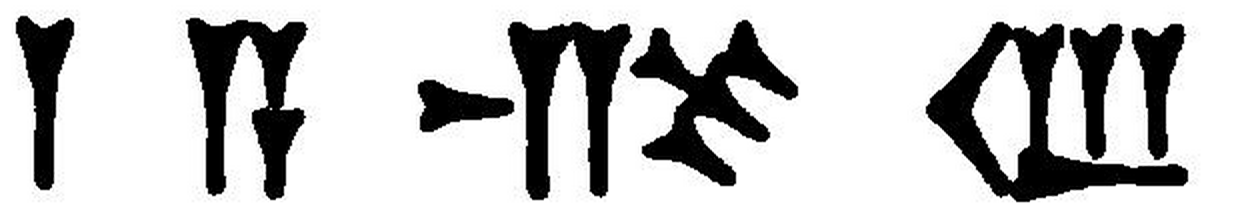
EA 161, line 2: "message (speaking thus) ': 1. A-zi-ru, servant-yours" (Individual (1.) + 3 cuneiform characters, A, zi, ru.)

The dealings of Aziru are well-known from the Amarna letters. While being a formal vassal of Egypt, he tried to expand his kingdom towards the Mediterranean coast and captured the city of Sumur (Simyrra). This was seen with alarm by his neighbouring states, particularly Rib-Hadda, the king of Gubla, (Byblos), who pleaded for Egyptian troops to be sent for their protection. Rib-Hadda was ultimately exiled—and probably not long afterwards killed—at the behest of Aziru. Rib-Hadda had left his city of Byblos for four months to conclude a treaty with the king of Beirut, Ammunira, but when he returned home, he learned that a palace coup led by his brother Ilirabih had unseated him from power. He temporarily sought refuge with Ammunira and unsuccessfully appealed for support from Egypt to restore him to the throne. (EA 136-138; EA 141 & EA 142) When this failed, Rib-Hadda was forced to ignominiously appeal to his sworn enemy, Aziru, to place him back on the throne of his city. Aziru promptly betrayed him and dispatched Rib-Hadda into the hands of the rulers of Sidon where Rib-Hadda almost certainly met his death.

This event is mentioned in Amarna letter EA 162 by Akhenaten to Aziru when the pharaoh demanded that Aziru travel to Egypt to explain his actions. Aziru was detained in Egypt for at least a year before being released when the advancing Hittites conquered the important city of Amki thereby threatening Amurru (EA 170). Aziru was allowed to leave Egypt and return to his kingdom.

=== Relations with Hatti ===
Aziru made secret contacts with the Hittite king Suppiluliuma I, and sometime upon his return to Amurru, he permanently switched his allegiance to the Hittites to whom he remained loyal until his death.

Hittite-Amurru text:

- Treaty of Suppiluliuma I with Aziru of Amurru (CTH 49)
- Treaty of Niqmaddu II of Ugarit and Aziru of Amurru (CTH 54)

In Year 7 of Mursili II (c. 1315 BCE), the "Second Syrian Rebellion" by Tette of Nuhasse and Kinza (supported by Horemheb by Egypt) saw Aziru and DU-Tessup remain loyal to Mursili II (CTH 62).

Amurru remained firmly in Hittite hands until the reign of the 19th Dynasty Pharaohs Seti I and Ramesses II.

== See also ==
- Amarna letter EA 161
