= Rib-Hadda =

King of Byblos in the 14th century BCE

- King of Byblos
- Reign: c. 1350 BC
- Successor: Ilirabih (brother)

Rib-Hadda (also rendered Rib-Addi, Rib-Addu, Rib-Adda) was king of Byblos during the mid fourteenth century BCE. He is the author of some sixty of the Amarna letters all to Akhenaten. His name is Akkadian in form and may invoke the Northwest Semitic god Hadad, though his letters invoke only Ba'alat Gubla, the "Lady of Byblos" (probably another name for Asherah).

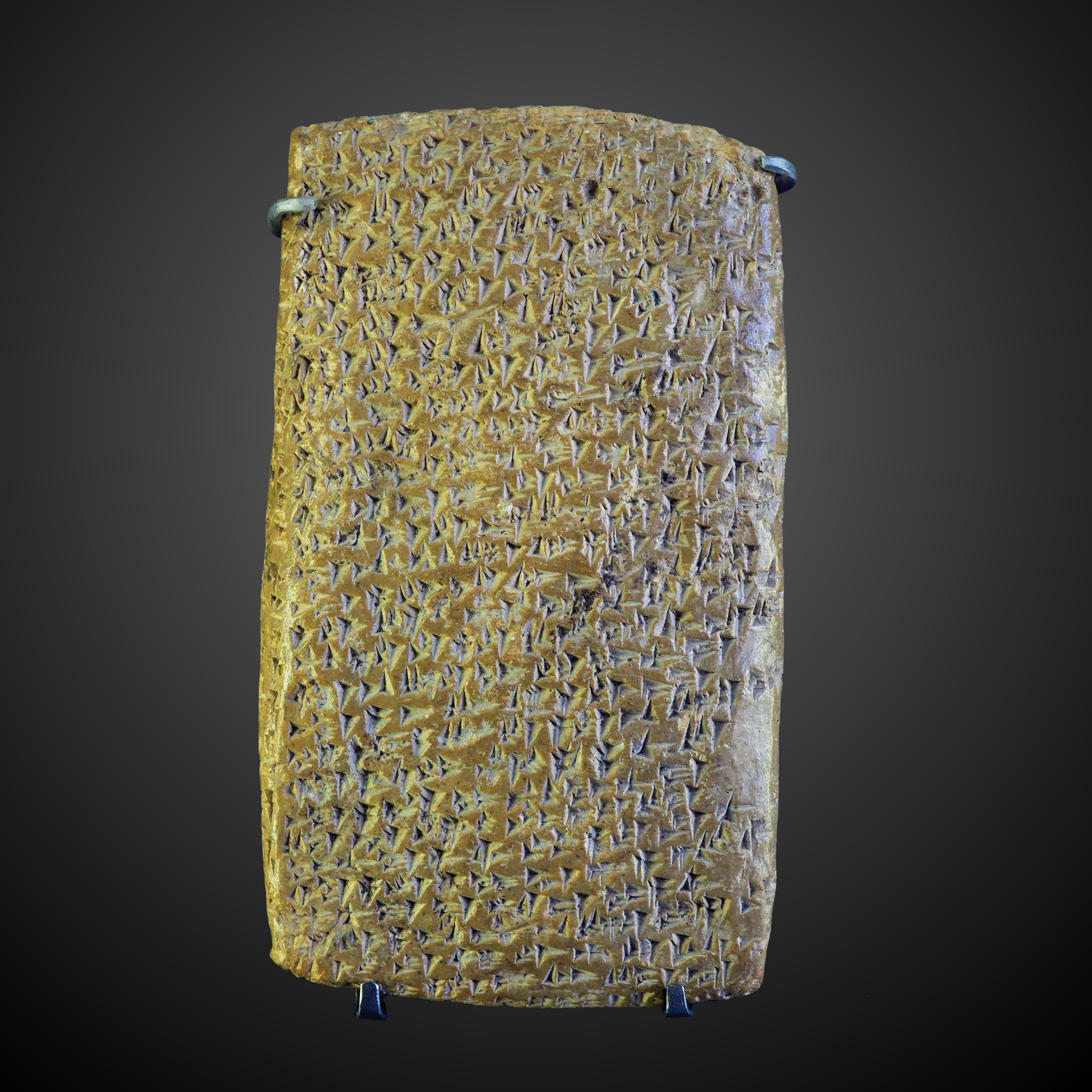
Letter EA 362 written by Rib-Hadda to Pharaoh, one of the Amarna letters, Louvre Museum

Rib-Hadda's letters often took the form of complaints or pleas for action on the part of the reigning Pharaoh. In EA 105, he begged Pharaoh to intervene in a dispute with Beirut, whose ruler had confiscated two Byblian merchant vessels. In EA 122, Rib-Hadda complained of an attack by the Egyptian commissioner Pihuri, who killed a number of Byblos' Shardana mercenaries and took captive three of Rib-Hadda's men.

Rib-Hadda was involved in a long-standing dispute with Abdi-Ashirta, the ruler of Amurru (probably in southeastern Lebanon and southwestern Syria), who hired mercenaries from among the Habiru, Shardana, and other warlike tribes. EA 81 contains a plea for Egyptian aid against Amurru, whose ruler Rib-Hadda accused of luring away his followers and inciting them to rebellion. He reported further that an assassin sent by Abdi-Ashirta had attempted to kill him. Rib-Hadda pleaded with Akhenaten to send Pítati to defend him from the forces of Amurru and from his own increasingly resentful peasantry. In one of the most poignant of the Amarna texts, Rib-Hadda wrote "the people of Ammiya have killed their lord and I am afraid." (EA 75). He added: "like a bird in a trap so I am here in Gubla (ie: Byblos)." (EA 74 & EA 81) Zemar, a city previously under his control, fell to Abdi-Ashirta (EA 84). Shortly thereafter the Egyptian commissioner Pahannate was withdrawn from northern Canaan, leaving Rib-Hadda without even the appearance of Egyptian support. His pleas for assistance evidently went unanswered (EA 107) and caused much annoyance to Akhenaten. Akhenaten's irritation with Rib-Hadda is recounted in EA 117 where the pharaoh is quoted saying to Rib-Hadda "Why do you alone keep writing to me?" (EA 117) While Abdi-Ashirta is reported to have been killed in EA 101, this only provided temporary relief to Rib-Hadda since the former was succeeded by his son Aziru; Rib-Hadda soon after complains about the depredations caused by "the sons of Abdi-Ashirta" in several Amarna letters to Akhenaten such as EA 103 and EA 109

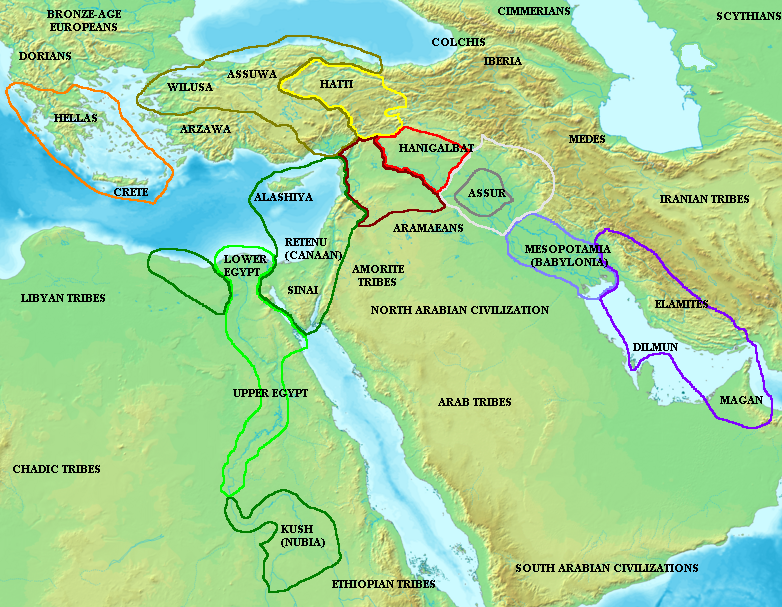
Map of the Ancient Near East during the Amarna period, showing the great powers of the period: Egypt (green), Hatti (yellow), the Kassite kingdom of Babylon (purple), Assyria (grey), and Mittani (red). Lighter areas show direct control, darker areas represent spheres of influence. The extent of the Achaean/Mycenaean civilization is shown in orange.

In EA 89, Rib-Hadda reported a coup d'etat in neighboring Tyre, in which the ruler of Tyre, his fellow kinsmen, was killed along with his family. Rib-Hadda's sister and her daughters, who had been sent to Tyre to keep them away from Abdi-Ashirta's Amurru invaders, were also presumed to be among those killed. Rib-Hadda wrote again to report that the Hittites were invading Egyptian protectorates in Syria and burning "the King's lands". (EA 126). At one point Rib-Hadda was forced to flee to exile in Beirut, under the protection of king Ammunira. (EA 137) In EA 75, Rib-Hadda details the changing political situation around Byblos:

[Ri]b Hadda says to his lord, king of all countries, Great King: May the Lady of Gubla grant power to my lord. I fall at the feet of my lord, my Sun, 7 times and 7 times. May the king, my lord, know that Gubla (ie: Byblos), the maidservant of the king from ancient times, is safe and sound. The war, however, of the Apiru against me is severe. (Our) sons and daughters and the furnishings of the houses are gone, since they have been sold [in] the land of Yarimuta for our provisions to keep us alive. "For the lack of a cultivator, my field is like a woman without a husband." I have written repeatedly to the palace because of the illness afflicting me, [but there is no one] who has looked at the words that keep arriving. May the king give heed [to] the words of [his] servant... ...The Apiru killed Ad[una the king] of Irqata-(Arqa), but there was no one who said anything to Abdi-Ashirta, and so they go on taking (territory for themselves). Miya, the ruler of Arašni, seized Ar[d]ata, and just now the men of Ammiy<a> have killed their lord. I am afraid. May the king be informed that the king of Hatti has seized all the countries that were vassals of the king of Mitan<ni>...Send arc[hers]

An aged and ailing Rib-Hadda continued to write to Pharaoh, telling him of violent upheavals in Phoenicia and Syria, including revolutions instigated by Abdi-Ashirta's son Aziru coupled with incursions by Apiru raiders. (e.g. EA 137)

Rib-Hadda was ultimately exiled by his younger brother Ilirabih and not long afterwards and depending on the interpretation of EA 162, either sent to be killed or offered a mayoral position in Sidon. This event is mentioned in Amarna letter EA 162 from Akhenaten to Aziru.

== See also ==
- Amarna letter EA 86, Rib-Hadda to official Amanappa at the Egyptian court of Pharaoh
- Amarna letter EA 75
- Amarna letter EA 362

== Resources ==
- Baikie, James. The Amarna Age: A Study of the Crisis of the Ancient World. University Press of the Pacific, 2004.
- Cohen, Raymond and Raymond Westbrook (eds.). Amarna Diplomacy: The Beginnings of International Relations. Johns Hopkins University Press, 2002.
- Moran, William L. (ed. and trans.) The Amarna Letters. Johns Hopkins University Press, 1992.
