= Abdi-Ashirta =

Ruler of Amurru

King of Amurru
- Reign: c. 1385 – c. 1340 BC
- Successor: Aziru
- Died: c. 1340 BC
- Issue: Aziru

Abdi-Ashirta (Akkadian: 𒀵𒀀𒅆𒅕𒋫 Warad-Ašîrta [ARAD_{2}-A-ši-ir-ta]; died c. 1340 BC) was the ruler of Amurru who was in conflict with King Rib-Hadda of Byblos.

== Reign ==
While some contend that Amurru was a new kingdom in southern Syria subject to nominal Egyptian control, new research suggests that during Abdi-Ashirta's lifetime, Amurru was a "decentralized land" that consisted of several independent polities. Consequently, though Abdi-Ashirta had influence among these polities, he did not directly rule them.

=== Conflict with Byblos ===
Rib-Hadda complained bitterly to Pharaoh; in the Amarna letters (EA) — of Abdi-Ashirta's attempts to alter the political landscape at the former's expense. Abdi-Ashirta's death is mentioned in EA 101 by Rib-Hadda in a letter to Amenhotep IV.

=== Succession ===
Unfortunately for Rib-Hadda, Abdi-Ashirta was succeeded by his equally capable son Aziru, who would later capture, exile and likely kill Rib-Hadda. Aziru subsequently defected to the Hittites, which caused Egypt to lose control over its northern vassals in Amurru which Aziru controlled.

== Amarna Archive ==
The Amarna Archive mentions his name 97 times.

=== Authored ===
==== Amarna Letter EA 060 ====
(o 001) [To] the king, the Sun god, my lord, a message from ʿAbdi-ʾAširte, your servant, the dust of your feet. I fall at the feet of the king, my lord, seven times and seven times.

(o 006) Look, I am a servant of the king and a dog of his house. I guard all the land of Amurru for the king, my lord. I said repeatedly to Paḥanaṯe, my commissioner, “Bring auxiliary troops in order to guard the lands of the king!”. Now all of the kings of the king of the people of the Hurrian lands desire to wrest the lands from my control and the control of [the commissioner] of the king, [my] lord, [but I] am guarding them. [Look, Pa]ḥanaṯe is w[ith you]. The king, [my] Sun god, should ask him if I am not guarding Ṣumur (and) Ullaza. When my commissioner (is absent) because of the instructions of the king, my Sun god, I guard the grain harvest of Ṣumur and of all the lands for the king, the Sun god, my lord. So may the king, my lord, care for me and assign me into the charge of Paḥanaṯe, my commissioner.

== See also ==
- Asherah
