= Sumur (Levant) =

Former city of Phoenicia

- Sumura, Zemar, etc.
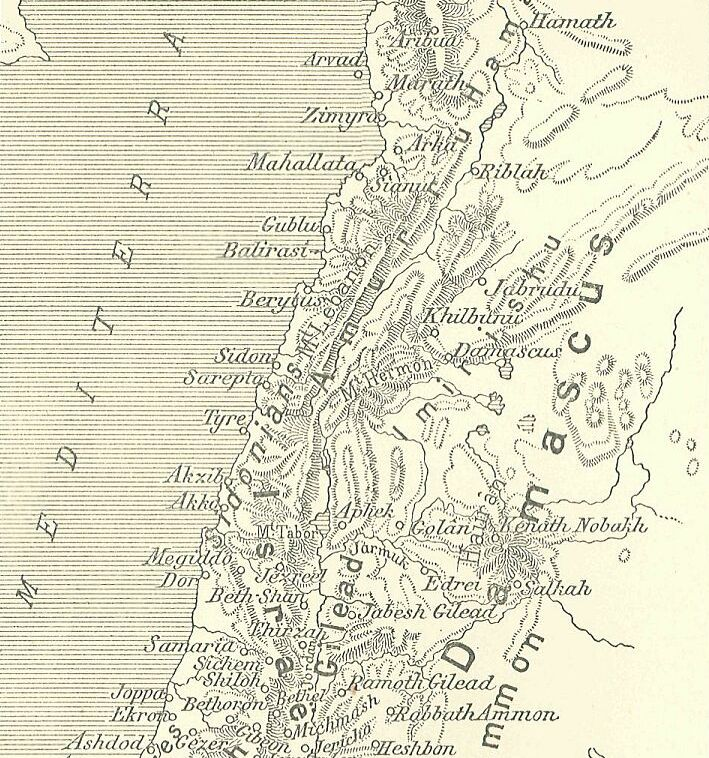
- The location of Zimyra/Sumur (in the north)

- Location within Syria
- 34.7081°N 35.9861°E
- Location: Syria
- Region: Tartus Governorate

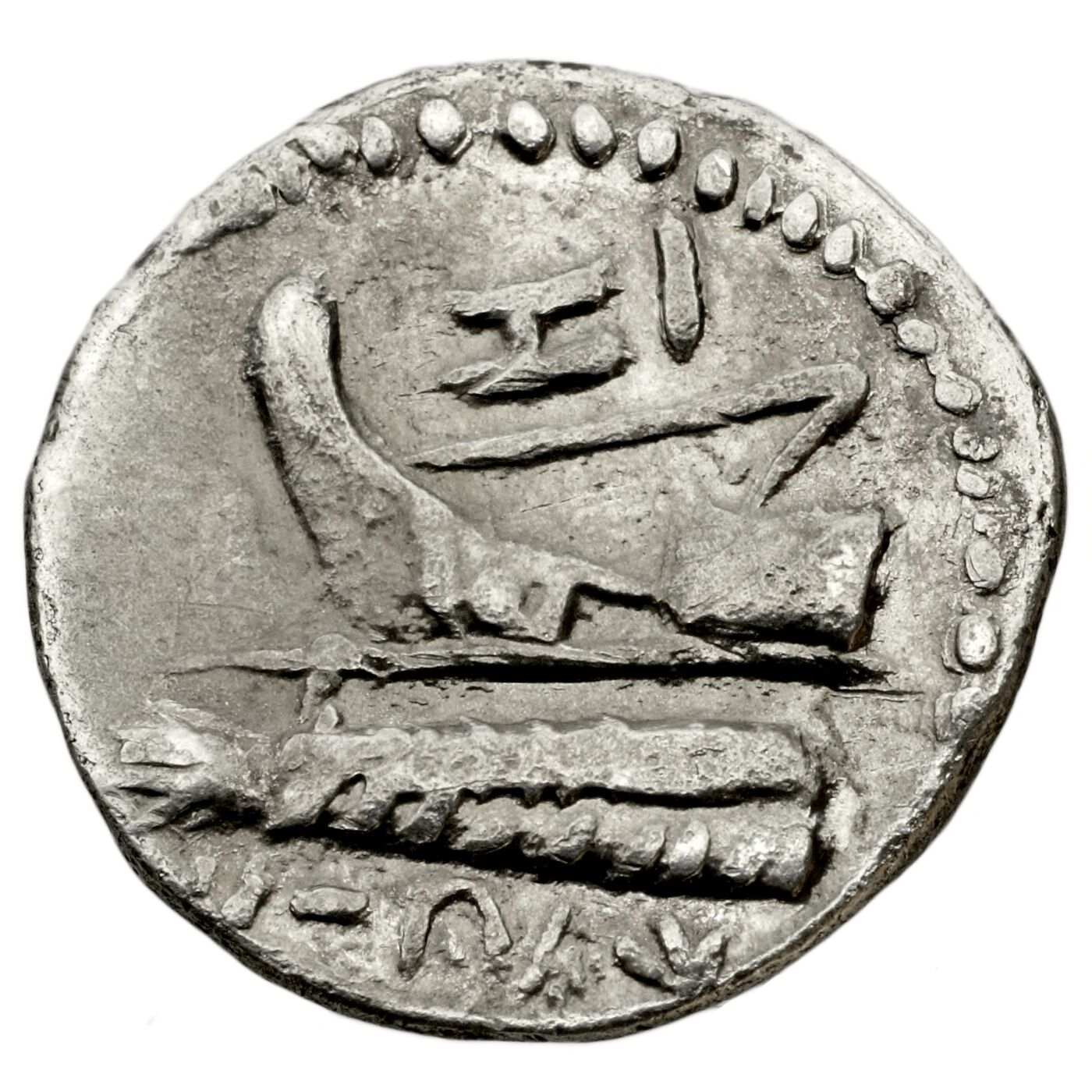
An ancient Phoenician coin of Simyra

Sumur (Biblical Hebrew: צְמָרִי [collective noun denoting the city inhabitants]; Egyptian: Smr; Akkadian: Sumuru; Assyrian: Simirra) was a Phoenician city in what is now Syria. It was a major trade center. The city has also been referred to in English publications as Simyra, Ṣimirra, Ṣumra, Sumura, Ṣimura, Zemar, and Zimyra.

Sumur (or "Sumura") appears in the Amarna letters (mid-14th century BCE); Ahribta is named as its ruler. It was under the guardianship of Rib-Addi, king of Byblos, but was conquered by Abdi-Ashirta's expanding kingdom of Amurru. Pro-Egyptian factions may have seized the city again, but Abdi-Ashirta's son, Aziru, recaptured Sumur. Sumur became the capital of Amurru.

It is likely, although not completely certain, that the "Sumur" of the Amarna letters is the same city later known as "Simirra." Simirra was claimed as part of the Assyrian empire by Tiglath-Pileser III in 738 BCE, but rebelled against Assyria in 721 at the beginning of the reign of Sargon II.

It has been linked by Maurice Dunand and N. Salisby to the archaeological site of Tell Kazel in 1957.
