= Tell Ashtara =

Archaeological mound in Syria

- تل عشترة (Arabic)
- Aštartu, Ashtaroth
- Location within Syria
- 32.8045°N 36.0155°E
- Type: Settlement
- Location: 4 km (2.5 mi) from Al-Shaykh Saad, Syria
- Region: Bashan (modern Hauran)

Site notes
- Area: 7 ha (17 acres)
- Excavation dates: 1966-1967
- Archaeologists: Ali Abu Assaf
- Condition: Ruins
- Management: Directorate-General of Antiquities and Museums
- Public access: Yes

Tell Ashtara (Arabic: تل عشترة) is an archaeological mound south of Damascus. The Bronze Age city that once stood here may have been mentioned in the Amarna letters correspondence of 1350 BC as Aštartu, and is usually identified with the Biblical city of Ashtaroth.

== History ==
=== Late Bronze Age ===
D36 z U33 D21 Z1 t w or D36 s U33 D21 Z1 t w
ꜥstꜣrwt
in hieroglyphs
Era: New Kingdom
(1550–1069 BC)

==== Thutmosid period ====
Aštartu is mentioned in the Annals of Thutmose III at the Temple of Karnak as 'Astarot, which Emmanuel de Rougé and Ludwig Borchardt identify with Biblical Ashtaroth and which Tomkins and Gaston Maspero identify with Tell Ashtarah.

==== Amarna period ====
Aštartu is referenced twice in the Egyptian Amarna letters (c. 1350 BC), specifically in letters EA 197 and EA 256.

EA 197 is catalogued as "Biryawaza's plight". Biryawaza was the mayor of Damascus, called Dimasqu in the letters' Akkadian.

EA 256 is a story concerning Mutbaal, the son of Labaya, and the Habiru, in regard to the whereabouts of Ayyab, who may be in Pihilu, modern day Pella, Jordan, and is a letter of intrigue, catalogued as "Oaths and denials", and lists 7 cities located in the Golan area.

Ayyab was the king of Aštartu. He authored of one surviving letter to the Egyptian pharaoh, listed as EA 364.

=== Iron Age ===
==== Assyrian period ====
Ashteroth (Tell Ashtara) is mentioned in the Assyrian relief in 730/727 BC, stored in the British Museum. It is a town where Levites lived. The relief depicts the Assyrians removing the people from Ashteroth in 730–727 BC. The relief was excavated at Nimrud by Sir Austen Henry Layard in 1851. The name Ashteroth is inscribed in cuneiform script on the top of the relief. The king in the lower register is Tiglath-pileser III. This is the first exile of the people out of Israel into Assyria. This event is mentioned in the Bible in 2 Kings 15:29. (“In the days of Pekah king of Israel came Tiglath-pileser king of Assyria, and took Ijon, and Abel-beth-maachah, and Janoah, and Kedesh, and Hazor, and Gilead, and Galilee, all the land of Naphtali, and carried them captive to Assyria.”)

The floppy turbans and pointed shoes and the style of the cloaks are typical for Israel at that period and shown on the Black Obelisk of Shalmaneser III, which is very close to it in the Assyrian section of the British Museum in London. The Black Obelisk is dated to about 825 BC. It was also excavated at Nimrud by Sir Austen Henry Layard in 1848. It shows king Jehu of Israel (or his representative) offering tribute to Shalmaneser III on the second register down.

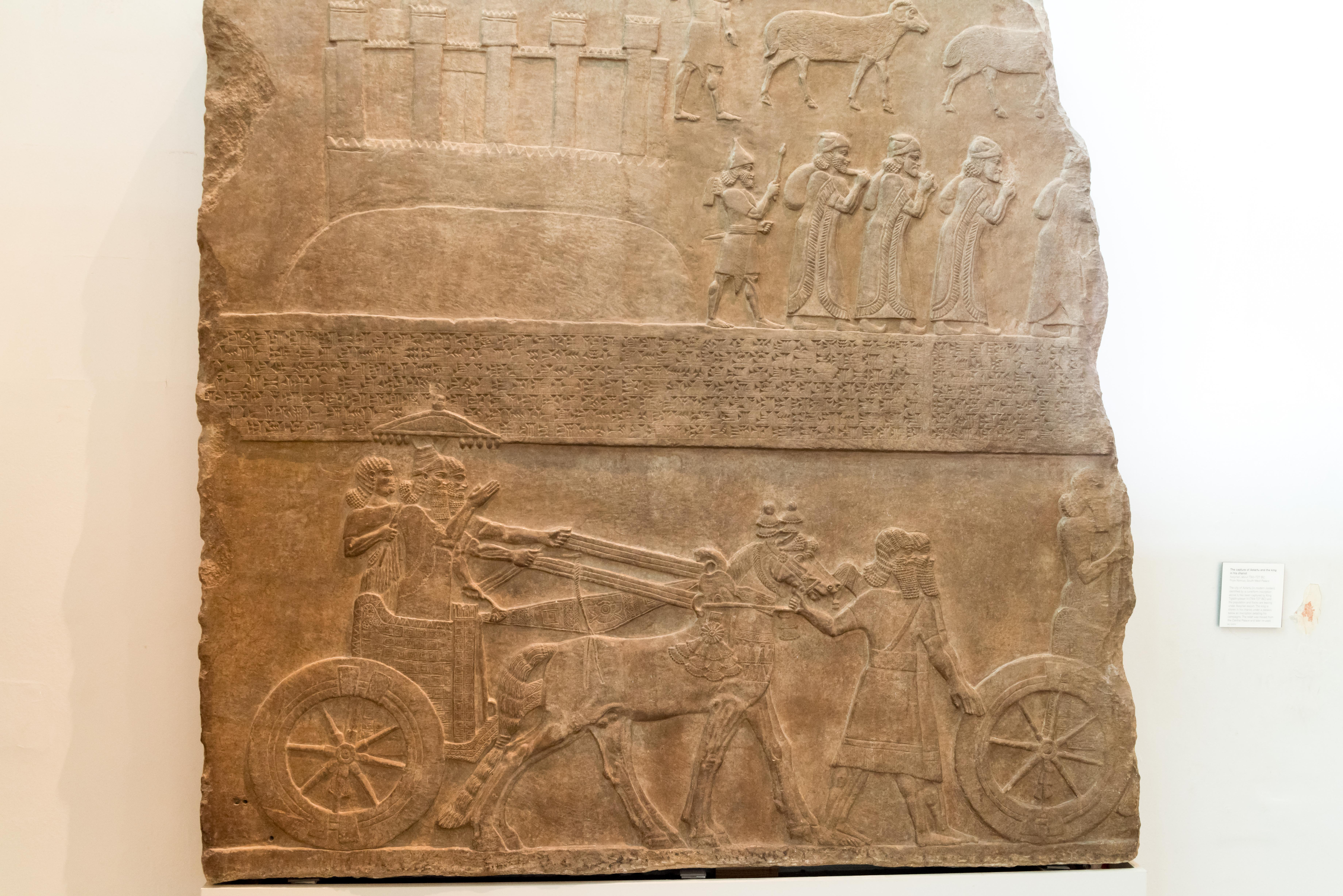
Ashteroth Relief at the British Museum

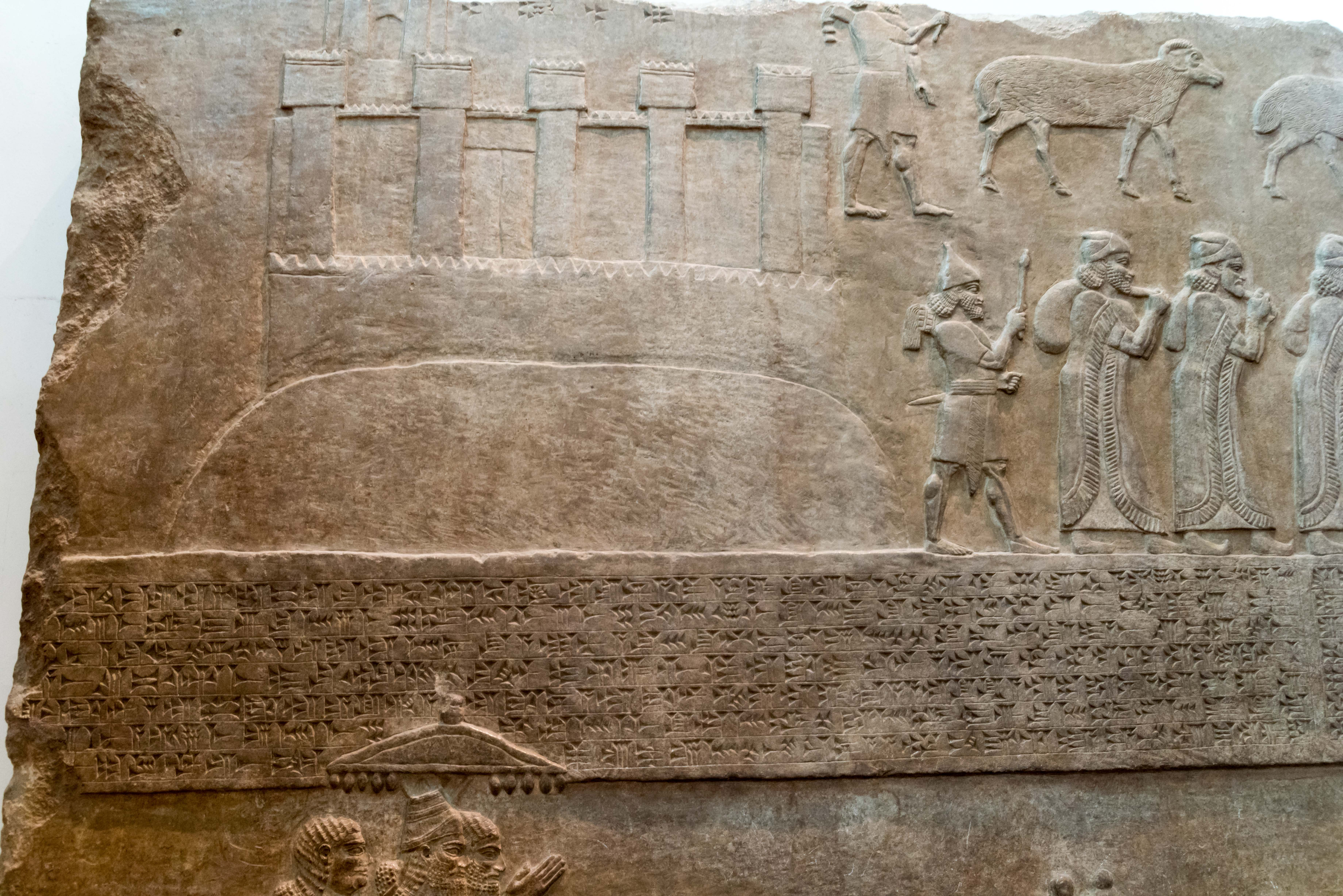
Ashteroth Relief at the British Museum

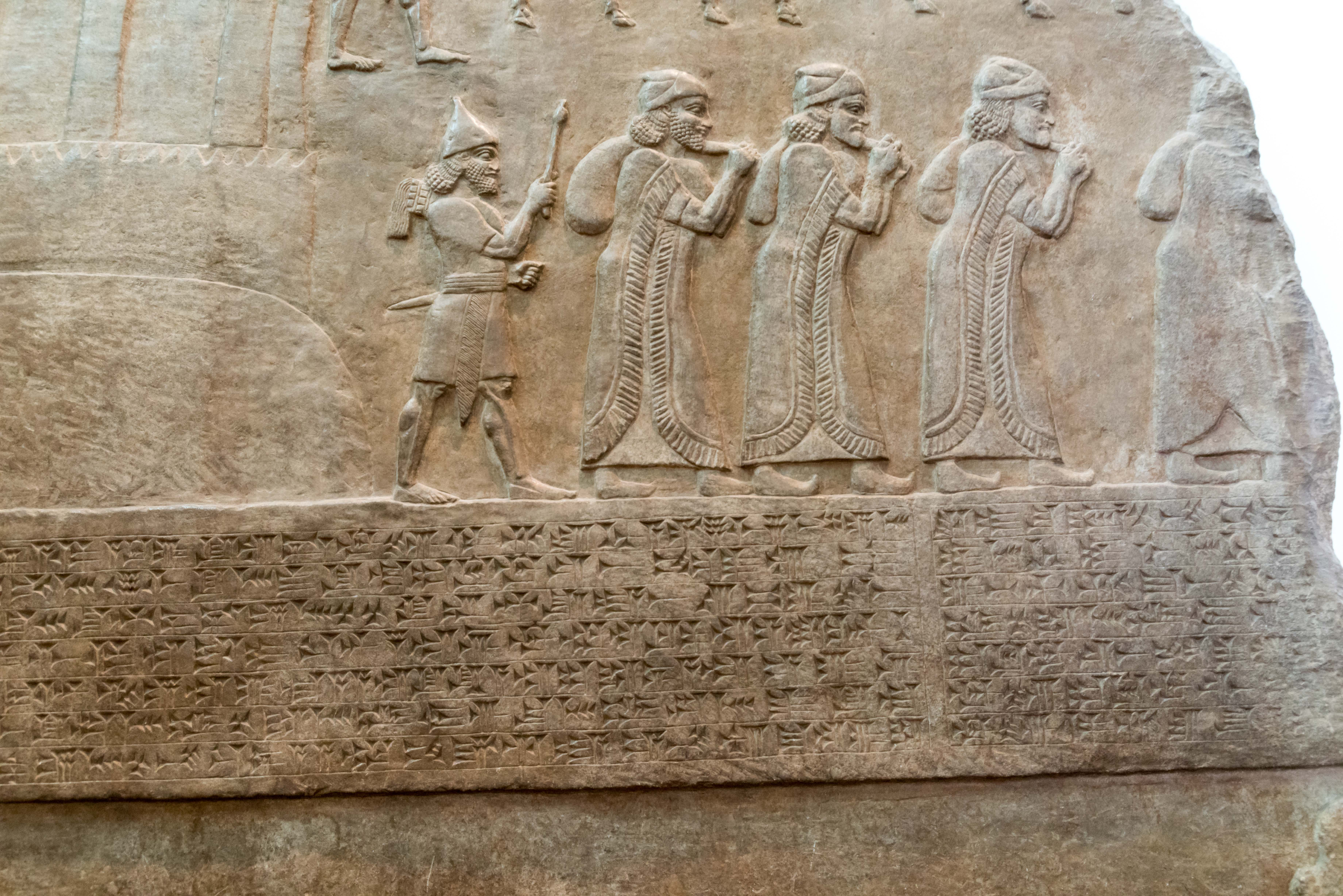

== See also ==
- Asherah
- Ashteroth Karnaim, initially simply Karnaim, a Biblical city who annexed the name of its neighbour, the city of Ashteroth
- Ayyab, mayor of Aštartu
- Shutu (for the name "Ayyab")
- Aram Damascus
