= Musa va 'Uj =

15th-century manuscript painting

- The Giant ‘Uj and the Prophets Moses, Jesus and Muhammad
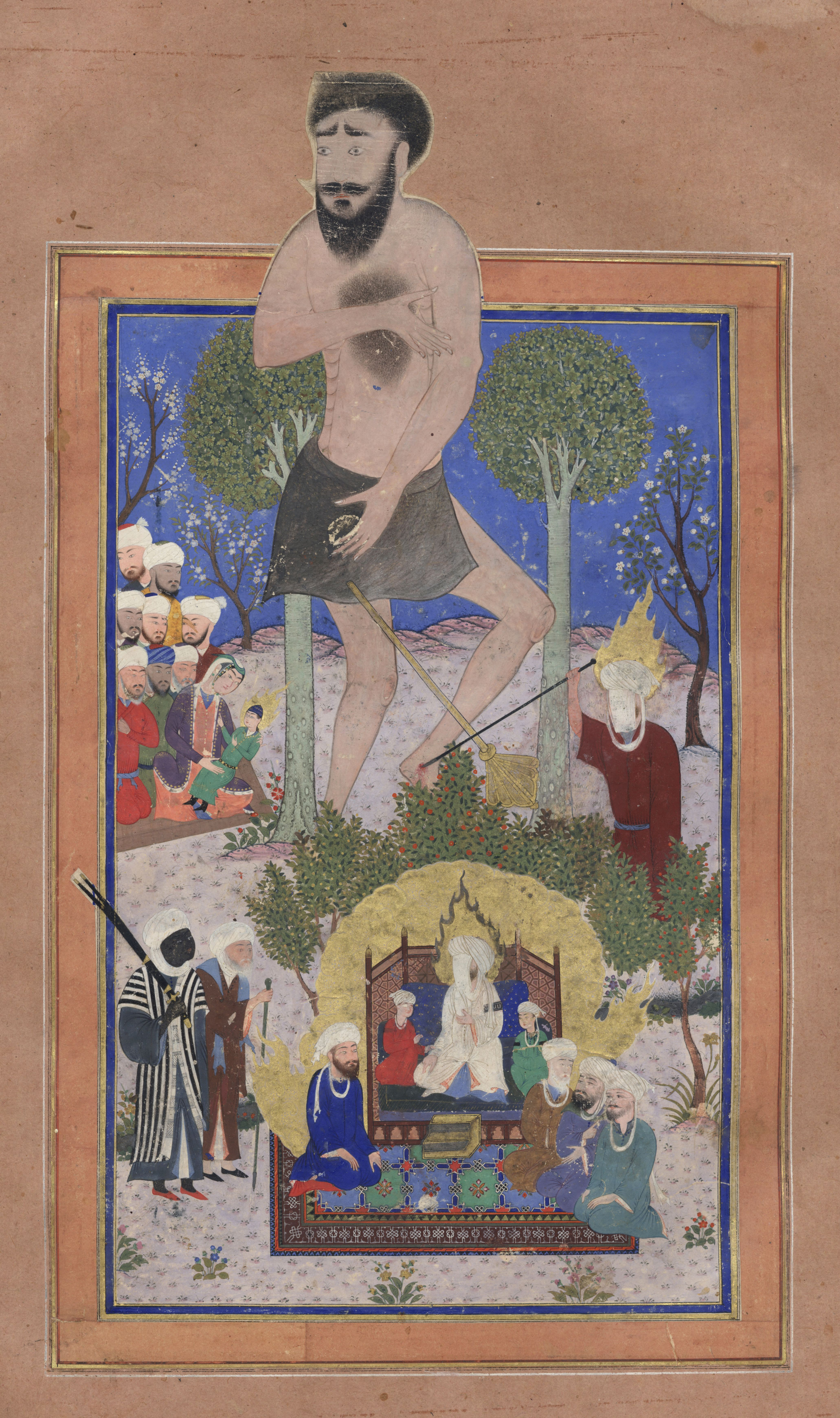
- Year: 15th century
- Medium: Ink, gold, silver and opaque watercolour on paper
- Dimensions: 25.6 cm × 16 cm (10.1 in × 6.3 in)
- Owner: Khalili Collection of Islamic Art
- Website: MSS 620

Musa va 'Uj (Arabic: موسى و عوج; lit. 'Moses and Og') is a 15th-century manuscript painting from Iran or Iraq. The painting is not signed by any artist, nor does it have an original title—in scholarly literature it has become known by the title Musa va 'Uj. It is unusual in combining figures from all three Abrahamic religions: the Islamic prophet Muhammad, the Madonna and Child, and Moses. Some of Muhammad's successors and family are also shown. First described in the 1930s, the painting was later acquired by the Khalili Collection of Islamic Art.

== Physical description ==
The manuscript folio is 38 centimetres (15 in) high and 24.8 centimetres (9.8 in) wide. The painting is mostly contained within a rectangle 25.6 centimetres (10.1 in) high and 16 centimetres (6.3 in) wide, with elements extending beyond the border at the top and left. It is done in ink, opaque watercolour paint and gold and silver. There are markings on the back by previous owners, though they are almost entirely smudged and illegible.

== Composition ==
The scene presents its figures among blossoming trees and other foliage under an intensely blue sky. The top half of the painting is dominated by 'Uj (the Arabic name for the Biblical character Og), whose huge upper body extends past the border of the painting. Og is described in the Torah as a giant who was king of Bashan and lived for 3,000 years until being slain by Moses. In Islamic tradition, this inspired the character of 'Uj, who was son of ʿAnāq, a villainous daughter of Adam.

Moses (Musa), with his face covered, is shown on the right of 'Uj, striking the giant's feet with a staff and drawing blood. 'Uj wears an expression of pain and is seen to drop an enormous mace. On the left is a group of kneeling figures including Mary who carries the young Jesus on her lap. In the lower part of the painting, Muhammad – his face veiled – sits on a geometrically patterned carpet, surrounded by the four caliphs who succeeded him: Abu Bakr, Umar, Uthman, and Ali. Next to Muhammad on the carpet are two of his grandsons, Hasan ibn Ali and Husayn ibn Ali – the second and third Imams of Shia Islam – depicted as young boys. Outside this group, on the left, are two of Muhammad's companions including Bilal ibn Rabah who carries Dhulfiqar, a double-pointed sword. Moses, Jesus, and Muhammad are each shown with a flaming nimbus and the group centred around Muhammad are enclosed in a flaming golden cloud. A silver stream runs across the painting, separating the foreground and background.

== History ==
Basil William Robinson attributed the painting to an artist he calls "the Gulistan painter" who contributed miniature paintings to a Kalīla wa-Dimna manuscript that is in the Gulistan Imperial Library in Tehran. Giti Norouzian found many stylistic differences between Musa va 'Uj and the Kalīla wa-Dimna miniatures and concluded they were the work of different artists with common influences.

According to J. M. Rogers, the painting was created in the early 15th century in either Baghdad or Tabriz. Later research by Eleanor Sims, editor of the journal Islamic Art, locates its creation to between 1460 and 1465 in either Tabriz or Shiraz. It is not known what manuscript it was part of, though it may have originally been the right-hand half of a frontispiece for Qisas al-Anbiya' (Stories of the Prophets). It was at one stage extracted from its original manuscript, mounted on card, and included in an album. It was first documented in the late 1930s in A Survey of Persian Art from Prehistoric Times to the Present by Pope and Ackerman and was acquired decades later by the Khalili Collection of Islamic Art (accession number MSS 620). It has been included in public exhibitions of the Khalili Collection, including in Abu Dhabi and Russia. The collector Sir David Khalili cited the painting as an example of how art can promote unity between faiths.

== Interpretation ==
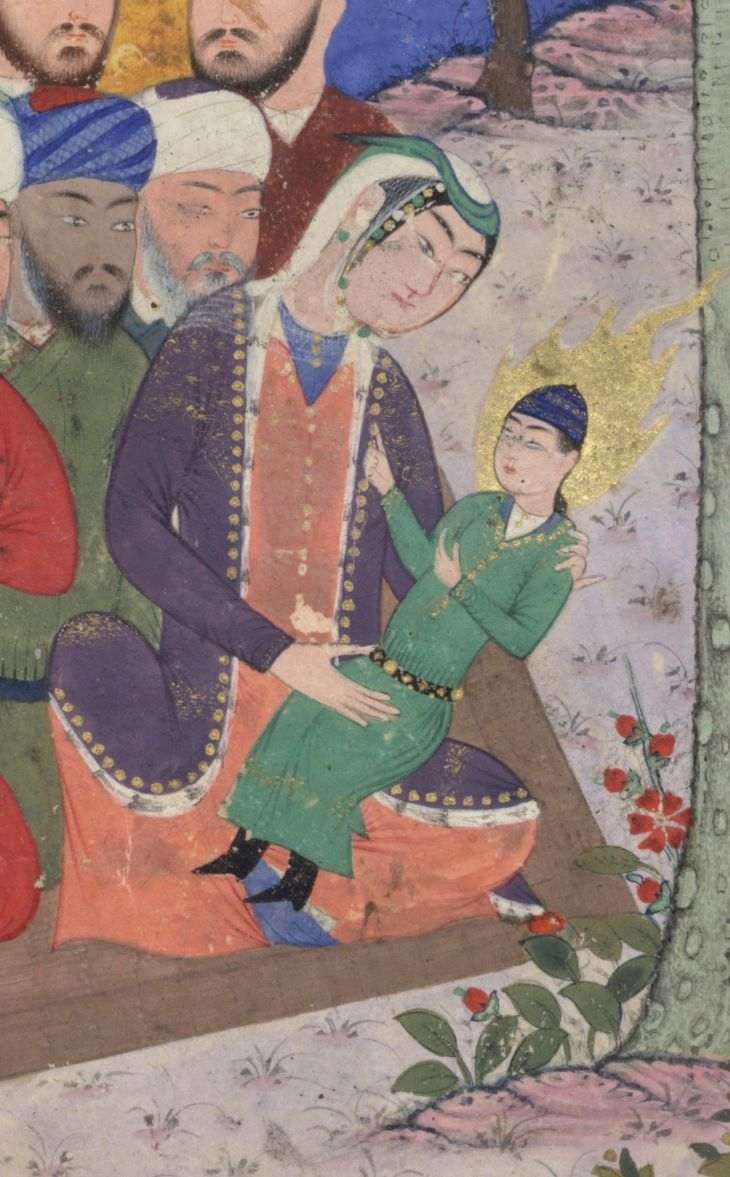
Detail of the Virgin Mary and Jesus

Two other paintings from the same period show Muhammad seated among his successor caliphs, his grandsons, and Bilal in a similar configuration. Unlike these, Musa va 'Uj does not include angels in the group. In combining this group with figures from Christianity and Judaism, it is thought to be unique.

Ernst Kühnel described the painting as "a kind of religious trilogy". Basil William Robinson described it as an allegory of the three Abrahamic religions. Other paintings from the period 1250 to 1500 AD gave Muhammad physical features, unlike Musa va 'Uj which shows him veiled and with a nimbus of golden flame. This suggests that the artist's intent was to emphasise Muhammad's status as a prophet rather than his physical reality. Eleanor Sims argues that the other figures seated with the Virgin Mary are meant to be the Apostles. Her interpretation is that by presenting Christian and Jewish prophets in the background and Muhammad with companions in the foreground surrounded by golden flame, it emphasises the status of Muhammad as the "Seal of the Prophets": the last of the prophets sent by God.

== See also ==
- Depictions of Muhammad
- Jesus in Islam
- Madonna (art) § Islamic view
- Moses in Islam
