= Gina (Canaan) =

Ancient Canaanite town

Gina, mentioned in the Amarna Letters, was a town in ancient Canaan. The citizens of Gina were responsible for the death of Labaya. The town was later known as Beth-Hagan and was probably located roughly on the spot of the modern town of Jenin. In ancient times as the Canaanite village of “Ein-Ganim” or Tel Jenin. The city of Ein-Ganim (Anem) is mentioned in the Hebrew bible as the city of the Levites of the Tribe of Issachar.

== History ==
Amarna letter 250 records the only mention of Gina. It explains (in passing) the recent killing of Labaya and the resultant of dealing with his two sons.

An excerpt of the mostly complete 60-line letter:

And the two sons of Lab'ayu keep talking to me like this, (saying): "Wage war against the 'people of [G]ina' for having killed our father. And if you do not wage war, then we will be your enemies." I have answered the two of them, "May the god of the king, my lord, preserve me from waging war against the 'pe[op]le of [G]ina,' servants of the king, my lord." May it seem rig[ht] in the sight of the king, my lord, and may he sen[d] one of his magnates to Biryawaza-(of Damascus) [to tel]l him, "You will ma[r]ch against the two sons of Lab'aya or [yo]u are a rebel against the king.

— EA 250, lines 15-27

== See also ==
- Mutbaal
