= Og =

Amorite king; Biblical character

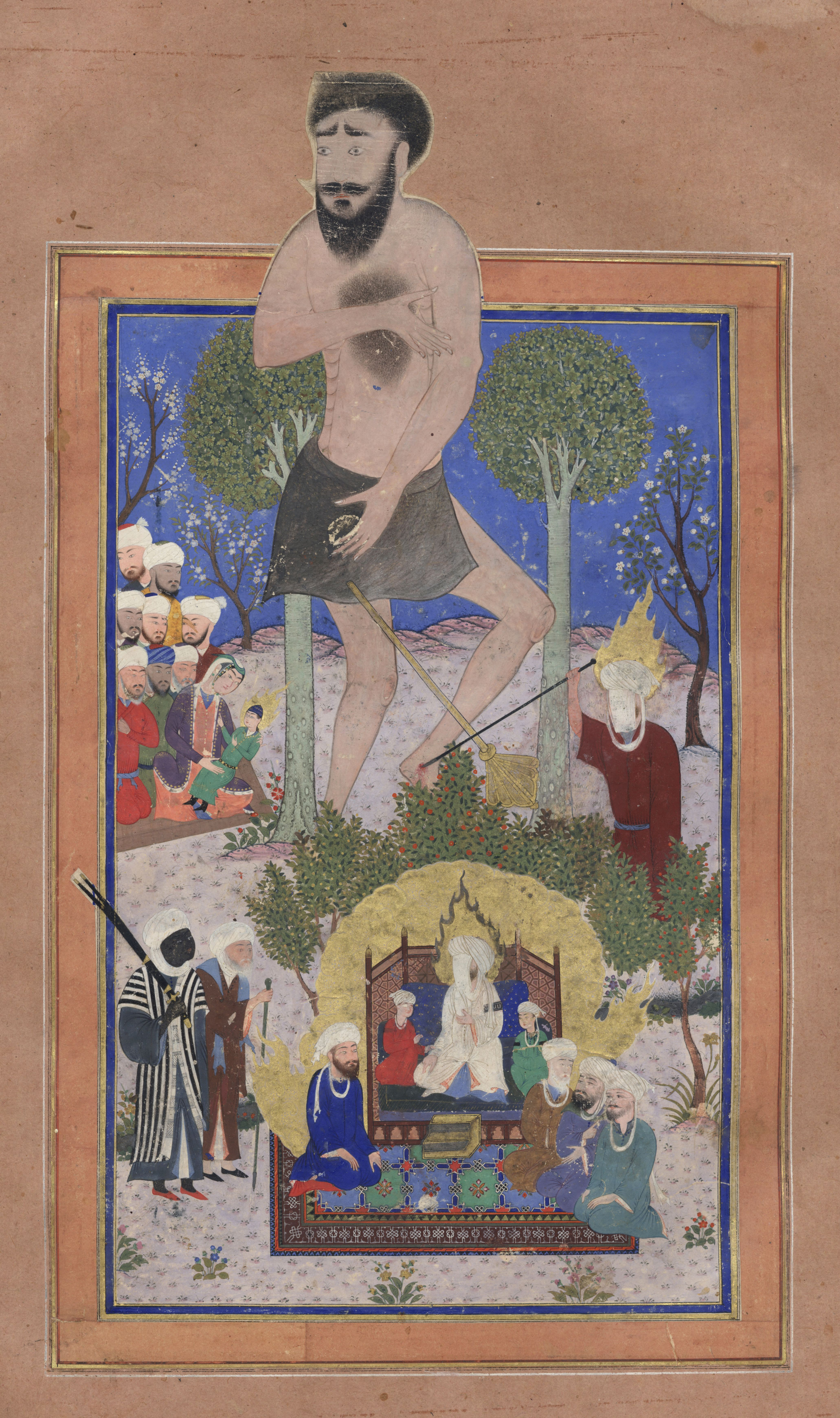
Og is depicted towering over groups of people in the manuscript painting Musa va 'Uj, c. 15th century

Og (Hebrew: עוֹג, romanized: ʿŌg [ʕoɡ]; Arabic: عوج, romanized: ʿŪj [ʕuːdʒ]; Ancient Greek: Ὤγ, romanized: Ōg) was, according to the Hebrew Bible and other sources, an Amorite king of Bashan who was slain along with his army by Moses and his men at the battle of Edrei. In Arabic literature he is referred to as ʿŪj ibn ʿAnāq (عوج بن عنق, "Og son of Anaq"), Anaq being a daughter of Adam in Islamic tradition.

Og is introduced in the Book of Numbers. Like his neighbor Sihon of Heshbon, whom Moses had previously conquered at the battle of Jahaz, he was an Amorite king, the ruler of Bashan, which contained sixty walled cities and many unwalled towns, with his capital at Ashtaroth (probably modern Tell Ashtara, where there still exists a 70-foot (20 m) mound).

The Book of Numbers, Chapter 21, and Deuteronomy, Chapter 3, continues:

Next we turned and headed for the land of Bashan, where King Og and his entire army attacked us at Edrei. But the Lord told me, "Do not be afraid of him, for I have given you victory over Og and his entire army, and I will give you all his land. Treat him just as you treated King Sihon of the Amorites, who ruled in Heshbon."

So the Lord our God handed King Og and all his people over to us, and we killed them all. Not a single person survived. We conquered all sixty of his towns—the entire Argob region in his kingdom of Bashan. Not a single town escaped our conquest. These towns were all fortified with high walls and barred gates. We also took many unwalled villages at the same time. We completely destroyed the kingdom of Bashan, just as we had destroyed King Sihon of Heshbon. We destroyed all the people in every town we conquered—men, women, and children alike. But we kept all the livestock for ourselves and took plunder from all the towns.

So we took the land of the two Amorite kings east of the Jordan River—all the way from the Arnon Gorge to Mount Hermon. (Mount Hermon is called Sirion by the Sidonians, and the Amorites call it Senir.) We had now conquered all the cities on the plateau and all Gilead and Bashan, as far as the towns of Salecah and Edrei, which were part of Og's kingdom in Bashan. (King Og of Bashan was the last survivor of the giant Rephaites. His bed was made of iron and was more than thirteen feet long and six feet wide. It can still be seen in the Ammonite city of Rabbah.)

Og's destruction, mentioned in Joshua 12:4, is told of in Psalms 135:11 and 136:20 as one of many great victories for the nation of Israel, and the Book of Amos 2:9 may refer to Og as "the Amorite" whose height was like the height of the cedars and whose strength was like that of the oaks. The text states that he was the last giant of the Rephaites. His stature made him sleep on an iron bed, which was about 9 cubits in length.

== Og and the Rephaim ==
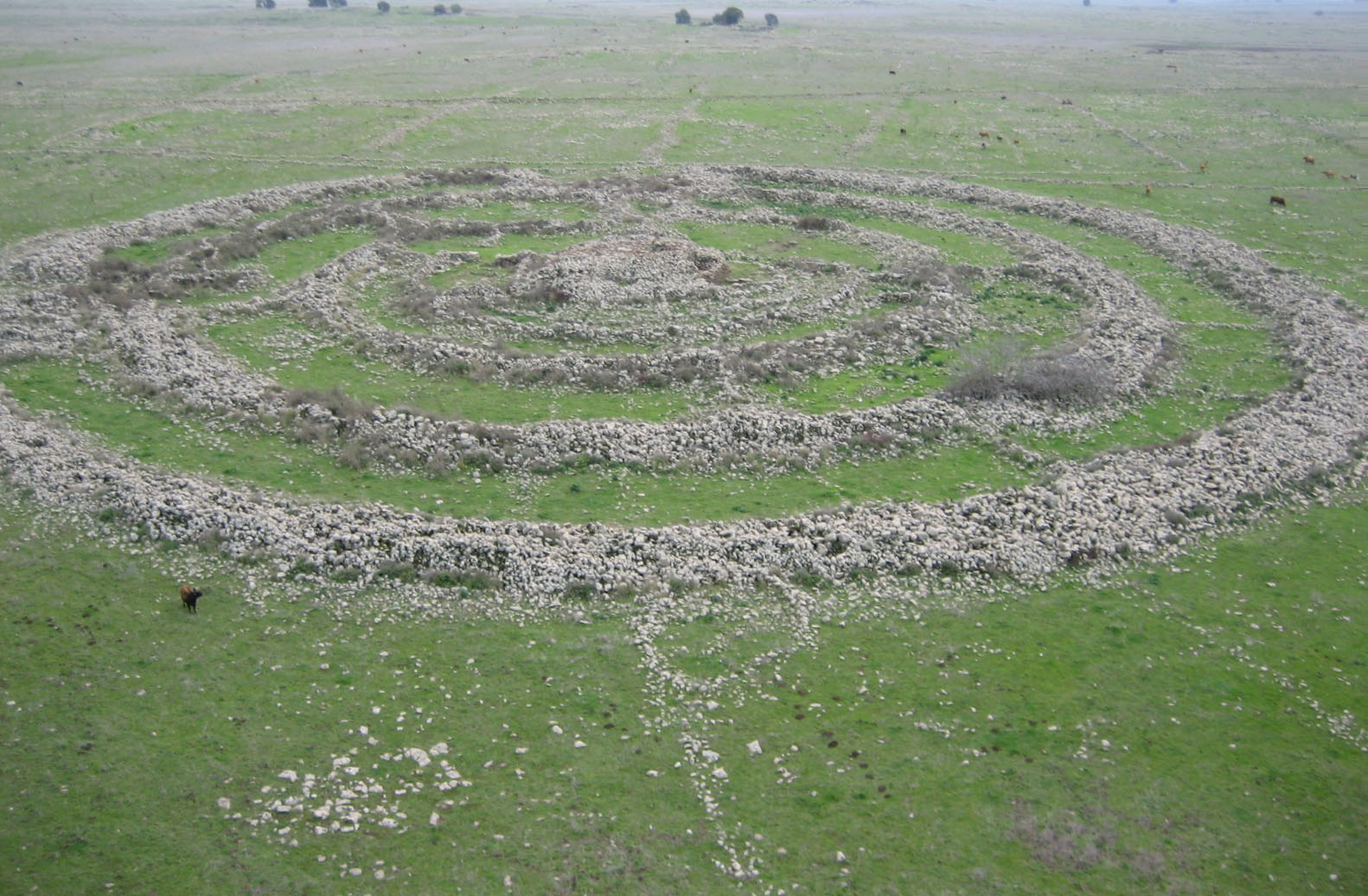
Some see Rujm el-Hiri, dating from the third Millennium BC in the Golan Heights, as a source for legends about "a remnant of the giants" for Og.

In Deuteronomy 3:11, and later in the book of Numbers and Joshua, Og is called the last of the Rephaim. Rephaim is a Hebrew word for giants. Deuteronomy 3:11 declares that his "bedstead" (translated in some texts as "sarcophagus") of iron is "nine cubits in length and four cubits in width", which is 13.5 by 6 feet (4.1 by 1.8 m) according to the standard cubit of a man. It goes on to say that at the royal city of Rabbah of the Ammonites, his giant bedstead could still be seen as a novelty at the time the narrative was written. If the giant king's bedstead was built in proportion to his size as most beds are, he may have been between 9 and 13 feet (2.7 and 4.0 m) in height. However, later Rabbinic tradition has it that the length of his bedstead was measured with the cubits of Og himself.

Michael S. Heiser argues that the reference to Og's bed is a link to the sacred marriage bed of Marduk, and so the dimensions are not a reliable indicator of Og's size. There may have also been traditions where King Og was a supernatural being and ruler of the underworld, because of his connection to the Repha'im. Francesca Stavrakopoulou and Baruch Margulis argue his kingdom was originally one for departed shades; but Laura Quick argues for a middle-ground position suggesting Biblical writers euhemerized older ancestral myths to reframe Og not as an underworld deity, but as the last of a legendary race of physical giants—though evidence for either proposition is inconclusive.

It is noteworthy that the region north of the river Jabbok, or Bashan, "the land of Rephaim", contains hundreds of megalithic stone tombs (dolmen) dating from the 5th to 3rd millennia BC. In 1918, Gustav Dalman discovered in the neighborhood of Amman, Jordan (Amman is built on the ancient city of Rabbah of Ammon) a noteworthy dolmen which matched the approximate dimensions of Og's bed as described in the Bible. Such ancient rock burials are seldom seen west of the Jordan river, and the only other concentration of these megaliths are to be found in the hills of Judah in the vicinity of Hebron, where the giant sons of Anak were said to have lived (Numbers 13:33).

== Og in non-Biblical inscriptions ==
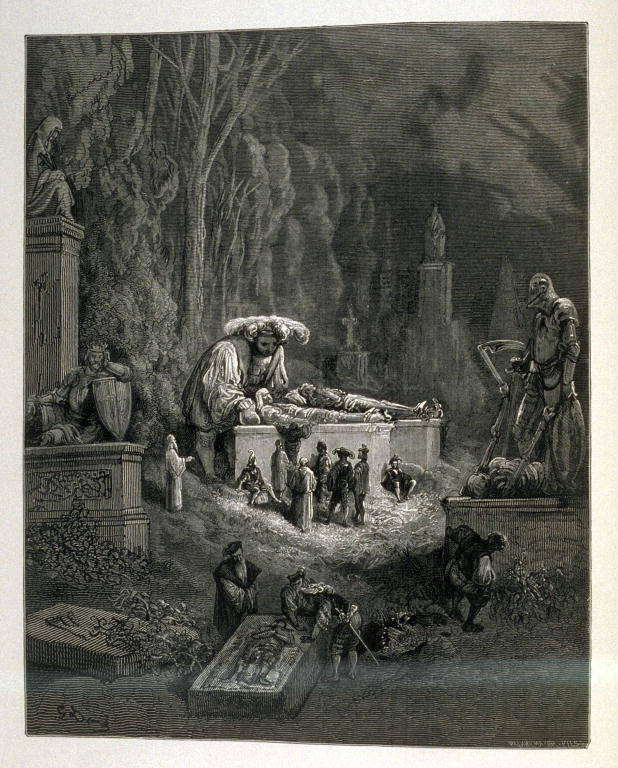
Illustration of Pantagruel for the Fourth Book in the Pantagruel and Gargantua series by François Rabelais published in Œuvres de Rabelais (Paris: Garnier Freres, 1873), vol. 2, Book IV, ch. XXVII, opposite page 87, Gustave Doré, 1873

In 1974, Wolfgang Röllig published a Phoenician inscription from Byblos (Byblos 13) which he argued it contained a reference to a deity named "Og". According to Röllig, it appears in a damaged 7-line funerary inscription that Röllig dates to around 500 BC, and appears to say that if someone disturbs the bones of the occupant, "the mighty Og will avenge me." Frank Moore Cross disputed Röllig's interpretation, proposing that the line of the inscription in question reads instead "my decrepit/mouldering bones".

A possible connection to Og and the Rephaim kings of Bashan can also be made with the much older Canaanite Ugaritic text KTU 1.108 from the 13th century B.C., which uses the term "king" in association with the root /rp/ or "Rapah" (the Rephaim of the Bible) and geographic place names that probably correspond to the cities of Ashtaroth and Edrei in the Bible, and with which king Og is expressly said to have ruled from (Deuteronomy 1:4; Joshua 9:10; 12:4; 13:12, 31). The clay tablet from Ugarit KTU 1.108 reads in whole, "May Rapiu, King of Eternity, drink [w]ine, yea, may he drink, the powerful and noble [god], the god enthroned in Ashtarat, the god who rules in Edrei, whom men hymn and honour with music on the lyre and the flute, on drum and cymbals, with castanets of ivory, among the goodly companions of Kothar. And may Anat the powerful drink, the mistress of kingship, the mistress of dominion, the mistress of the high heavens, [the mistre]ss of the earth." Og's existence and true identity is disputed. According to Matthew McAffee, the historical reminiscenses of Ugaritic mythology indicate that the Hebrew Bible has probably preserved a genuinely ancient tradition of an Amorite king Og stemming from the 2nd millennium BC. He also argues that the description of Og as a Rephaim seems to reflect an Old Amorite theology which gave such status to their deceased kings.

== In the Talmud ==
The Jewish Talmud embellishes the story, stating that Og was so large that he sought the destruction of the Israelites by uprooting a mountain so large, that it would have crushed the entire Israelite encampment. The Lord caused a swarm of ants to dig away the center of the mountain, which was resting on Og's head. The mountain then fell onto Og's shoulders. As Og attempted to lift the mountain off himself, the Lord caused Og's teeth to lengthen outward, becoming embedded into the mountain that was now surrounding his head. Moses, fulfilling Yahweh's injunction not to fear him, seized a stick of ten cubits length, and jumped a similar vertical distance, succeeding in striking Og in the ankle. Og fell down and died upon hitting the ground. Many great rabbis, notably Shlomo ibn Aderet, have explained this story in an allegorical manner.

== In Islam ==
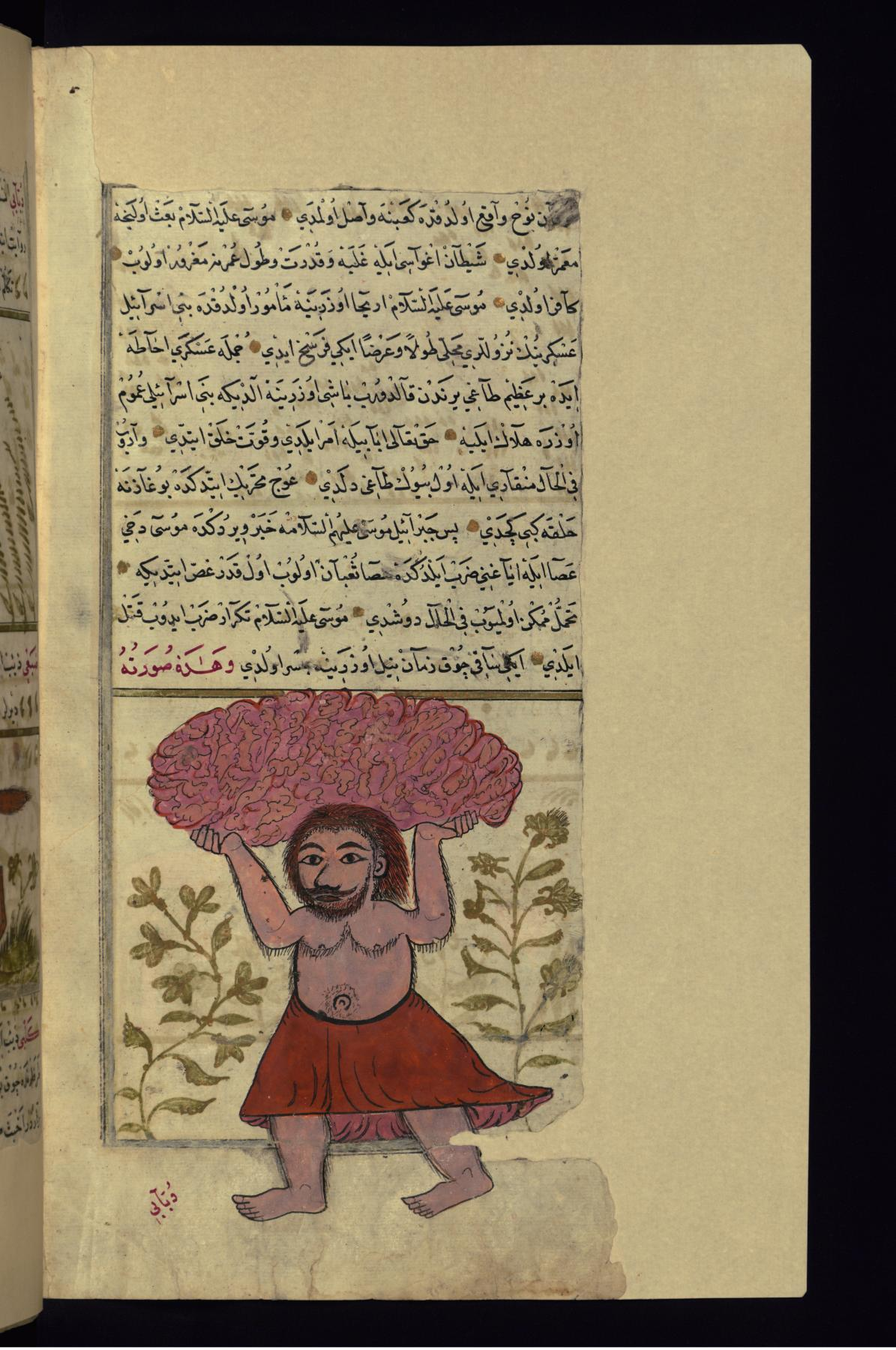
The giant 'Uj ibn 'Unuq carries a mountain with which to kill Moses and his men, manuscript from 1717.

'Uj ibn Anaq ('Ûj ibn 'Anâq) is a giant in Islamic mythology. Uj is not mentioned in the Quran or canonical hadiths. The origins of this character lay in Jewish folklore and the Old Testament, i.e. king Og. He takes his matronymic from his mother ʿAnāq, who begat him after an incestuous affair.

Famous and much-painted episodes include his fight with the Prophet Moses (see Musa va 'Uj), and his fishing and frying of whales, while he stands just about knee-deep in the ocean.

== "Ogias the Giant" ==
The 2nd-century BC apocryphal book "Ogias the Giant" or "The Book of Giants" depicts the adventures of a giant named Ogias who fought a great dragon, and who was supposedly either identical with the Biblical Og or was Og's father.

The book enjoyed considerable currency for several centuries, especially due to having been taken up by the Manichaean religion.

== Hurtaly ==
In Pantagruel, Rabelais lists Hurtaly (a version of Og) as one of Pantagruel's ancestors. He describes Hurtaly as sitting astride the Ark, saving it from shipwreck by guiding it with his feet as the grateful Noah and his family feed him through the chimney.

== See also ==
- Gibborim
- Goliath
- Anakim
- Bergelmir
- Finger of Og
- Moses in rabbinic literature
