= Ayyab =

Ancient ruler of Aštartu

Ayyab (fl. c. 1350 BC) may have been a ruler of Astartu during the Amarna period.

According to the Amarna letters, cities/city-states and their kings in the region — just like countries to the north, such as Hittite, fell prey to a wave of attacks by ʿApiru raiders. The Amarna correspondence corpus covers a period from 1350–1335 BC.

Another ruler of Astartu cited in the Amarna letters is Biridašwa. The letters do not clearly indicate their title, leading some scholars to describe them as kings of Damascus (Dimašqu) while others believe they were high Egyptian officials, possibly mayors.

== Amarna Archive ==
The Amarna Archive has 3 references to Ayyab. He authored one letter (EA 364) to the Pharaoh. He is mentioned in EA 256, a letter by Mutbaal of Pihilu (Pella, Jordan), one of the sons of the rebellious Labaya.

The chronological order of events may indicate that Ayyab ruled before Biridašwa.

=== Authored ===
==== Amarna Letter EA 364 ====
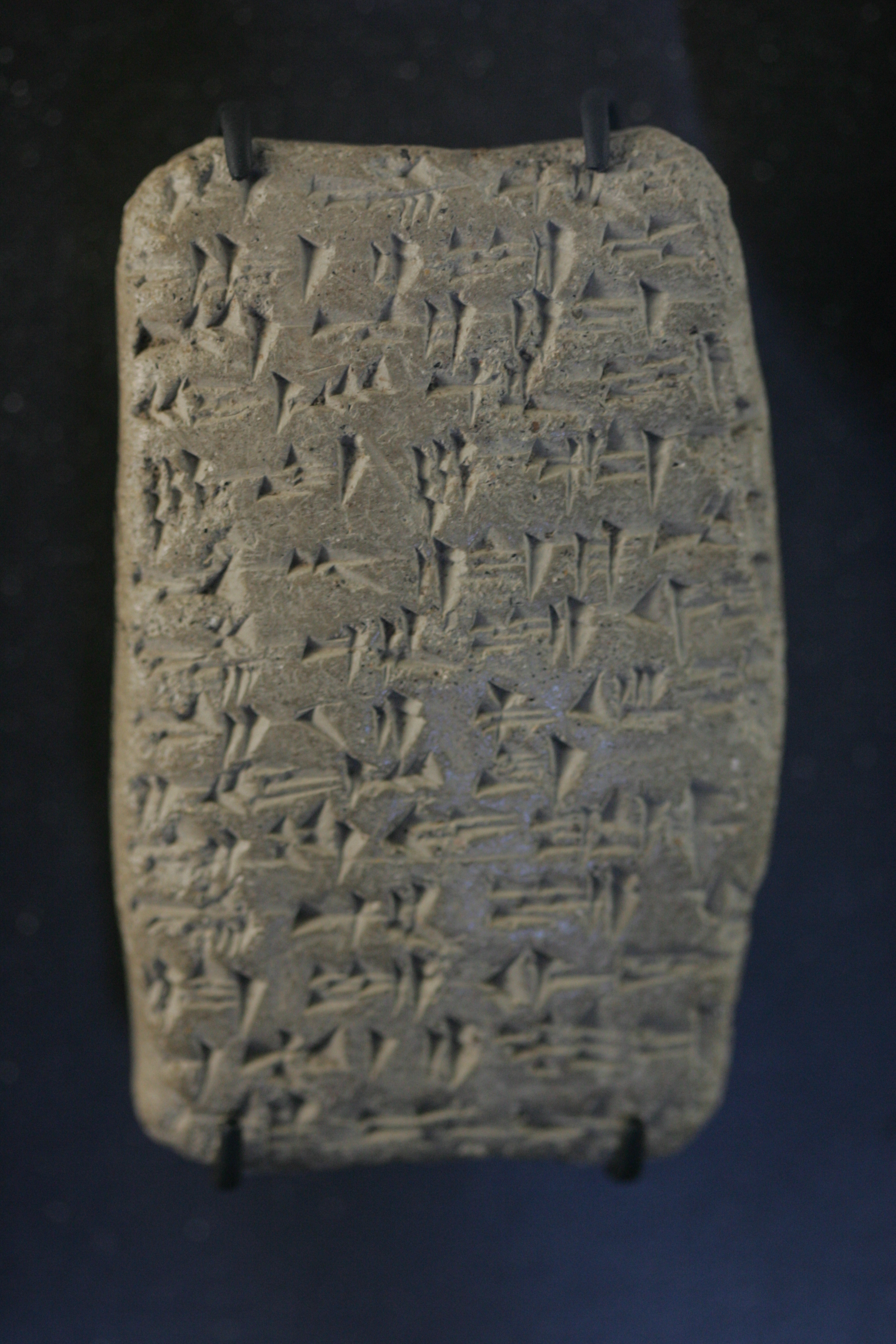
Ayyab's letter to Pharaoh, Amarna letter EA 364, title: Justified War. His name in line 2 is spelled: A-iYa-aB, "message (speaking), Ayyab...".

In the Amarna Archive, Ayyab is the author of one letter to the Egyptian pharaoh (EA 364). He is in conflict with the city of Hazor to the northwest.

To the king, my lord: Message of Ayyab, your servant. I fall at the feet of my lord 7 times and 7 times. I am the servant of the king, my lord, the dirt at his feet. I have heard what the king, my lord, wrote to me through Atahmaya. Truly, I have guarded very carefully, (i.e. Ma-GAL, Ma-GAL), [the citie]s of the king, my lord. Moreover, note that it is the ruler of Hasura who has taken 3 cities from me. From the time I heard and verified this, there has been waging of war against him. Truly, may the king, my lord, take cognizance, and may the king, my lord, give thought to his servant. —EA 364, lines 1-28 (complete)

=== Mentioned ===
==== Amarna Letter EA 256 ====
A letter from Mutbaal of Pihilu (Pella) to the commissioner Yanhamu, rejecting rumors that he was concealing Ay-'ab.

(o 001) Speak to Yanḥamu, my lord, a message from Mut-Baʿli, your servant. I fall at the two feet of my lord.

(o 004) How is it said in your presence: "Mut-Baʿli ran away; {Can. he concealed} ʾAy-ʾab"? How can the king of Pihilu run away from the commissioners (Can. gloss: sukinu-officials) of the king, his lord? As the king, my lord, lives, as the king, my lord, lives, I swear that ʾAy-ʾab is not in Pihilu! See, he has not been (there) for two months. Look, ask Bin-ʾilima; look, ask [T]aduwa; look, ask Yašuya! (r 019) Indeed, since the robbery of Šulum-Marduk I went to the aid of ʿAštartu (only) when all the cities of the land of Garu became hostile, (namely) Udumu, Aduru, Araru, Mištu, Magdalu, ʿEnu-ʿanabi, (and) Zarqu. The cities of Hayyanu and Yabišima were seized.

(r 029) Something else: See, (only) since you sent a tablet to me did I send a message to him. By the time you arrive from your journey, see, he will have reached Pihilu, and I will surely obey your commands.

The Land of Garu may compare to modern Golan/Bashan/Hauran-region. The name Golan may derive from Garu with the -r and -l being interchangeable. The cities that follow may then be spread in this region. Udumu, Aduru (in Hauran?), Araru (ʿAraʿra north in Hauran), Mištu, Magdalu, ʿEnu-ʿanabi, (and) Zarqu. A counterpart to Astartu in the Bashan region would have been modern Daraa.

Outside Garu were Hayyanu may be in Bashan south of the Ḥauran-plateau and Yabišima may perhaps be rendered as Yabesh/Yabish/Yabessa, being similar to Jabesh-Gilead (Ybś) south of the Yarmouk River.

== See also ==
- Aram-Damascus
- Biridašwa, mayor of Aštartu about 1350–1335 BC
- Shutu
- Tahmašši, Egyptian official
- Upu
