= Biridašwa =

Mayor of Aštartu about 1350–1335 BC

Biridaswa

King of Astartu
- Reign: c. 1340 BC

Biridašwa (Sanskrit: "Prītāśva," "whose horse is dear" (Mayrhofer II 182); fl. c. 1340 BC) was a ruler of Astartu, (Tell Ashtara), south of Damascus, (named Dimasqu/Dimašqu), during the time of the Amarna letters correspondence, about 1350–1335 BC. A second ruler of Astartu, Ayyab, existed in this short 15–20 year time period.

== History ==
Though Biridašwa did not communicate with the Egyptian pharaoh directly in any of the Amarna letters, he, along with the mayors of Busruna and Halunnu were involved with the intrigues of city/city-state takeovers, in the region of Damascus. The region around Dimašqu was named Upu, or Apu, a name going back to at least pharaoh Thutmose III's time.

== Amarna Archive ==
=== Letters authored by him ===
In the Amarna Archive, no letter has been found authored by Biridašwa.

=== Letters mentioning him ===
The Amarna Archive have four references to the name Biridašwa, found in two letters EA 196 and EA 197.

Biryawaza, who was associated with Dimašqu, wrote 2 letters addressed to pharaoh concerning problems with Biridašwa.

==== Amarna Letter EA 197 ====
(o 001') [ ... sa]id t[o ...] your servant in A-[...] “[You gave] his horses and his chariots to the Habiru, and you did not [give them] to the king, my lord.” {Can. Who} am I but a servant? Everything that is mine is for the king. Biridašwa saw this deed and incited the town of Yanʾuam against me. He shut the city gate behind me and captured the chariots from the town of ʿAštartu. He gave them to the Habiru and did not give them to the king, my lord. The king of Buṣruna and the king of Halunnu saw (this), and they waged war with Biridašwa against me. They said: "Come! Let us kill Biryawaza. We will not dispatch him to[the land of Ta]hšu."But I got away from their [control] and stayed in [the land of Apu and] Damascus. When [they saw] that I was serving [the king, my lord, they] were saying, "We are [servants of the king of the land of Ha]tti," but I was saying, "I am a servant of the king of the land of Egypt." And Arzawya went to Qid[šu]. He brought (along) ʿAḏi[ri]’s troops, and he seized Šaddu. He gave it over to the Habiru; he did not give it to the king, my lord.

(r 031') Look, Etakkama caused the land of Qidšu to go out of (the king's) control, and this one, Arzawya, together with Biridašwa, is (now) causing the land of Apu to go out of (the king's) control. So the king should take care of his land lest hostile men capture it. Since my brothers are hostile to me, I am guarding Kumidu, the city of the king, my lord. The king should make peace for his servant; the king should not abandon his servant, [so that] the kings of [the land of Qidšu] and the land of Apu see i[f ... ... ... ...]

(l.e. 001') [...] I have seen the regular troops.

Edition by Jacob Lauinger and Tyler Yoder (CC-BY-SA 3.0).

==== Amarna Letter EA 196 ====
Biryawaza writes to the pharoh mentioning both the King of the Land of Hatti, dating this letter to when Suppiluliuma I of Hatti attacked Tushratta of Mitanni, and Biridašwa.

(o 001) Spea[k to the king], my [lord, a message from Bir]yawaza, [your] servant. I fall [a]t the feet of the king, <my> l[ord], seven (times) plus seven times.

(o 005) I have obeyed when the k[ing, my] lord, sent [...]-saya. I am on guard, and I [ser]ve the king, my lord, in this [pl]ace. Abundant [troops] of the king, my lord, should [quickly] reach [the king of the land of Ha]tt[i]. The guard of the king, [my lord, has gone away] from me. I am the [one servant] of the king who remains to [him]. The king, my lord, should know that [al]l of the servants of the king, my lord, left to follow [the king] of the land of Hatti, but all of the commissioners [of the king], my [lo]rd, who came forth [arri]ved. [...] (r 026) [...] my [...], my [... ...] my wives [and] my daughter-in-law, and he placed (them) in the lap (Akk. gloss: his lap).

(r 030) Something else: Now, [the king], my lord, has learned of this matter. Since time immemorial, a ruler has not done this de<ed>.

(r 033) Something else: The king, [my] lord, should dispatch 200 men to me in order to guard [your servant and] in order to guard the cities of the king, [my] lord, [un]til I see the regular army of the king, my lord. The king, my lord, should not keep silent [rega]rding this deed that Biridašwa [has] done [becau]se the land of [the king], my lord, and [his] cities departed.

Edition by Jacob Lauinger and Tyler Yoder (CC-BY-SA 3.0).

== See also ==
- Biryawaza
- Aram Damascus
- Upu
