= Hurtaly =

Legendary giant

Hurtaly or Hurtali is a legendary giant. He appears in Gargantua and Pantagruel by Rabelais, as an ancestor of Gargantua. Hurtaly is there said to have survived Noah's Flood, by sitting astride Noah's Ark ("il estoit dessus à cheval, jambe de sà, jambe de là"). He is characterised as a beau mangeur des souppes ("a fine eater of soups"), and as the son of Faribroth, father of Nembroth.

A biography of Rabelais states that Hurtaly is based on the Biblical Og, King of Bashan, and that Rabelais was paraphrasing the Pirkei of Rabbi Eliezar of Hyracanus. This legend is also mentioned in the Jewish Encyclopedia of Adler and Singer (article "Og"), where it is also attributed to the Pirke of Rabbi Eliezar .
