= Ashteroth Karnaim =

Ancient city in the land of Bashan mentioned in the Hebrew Bible

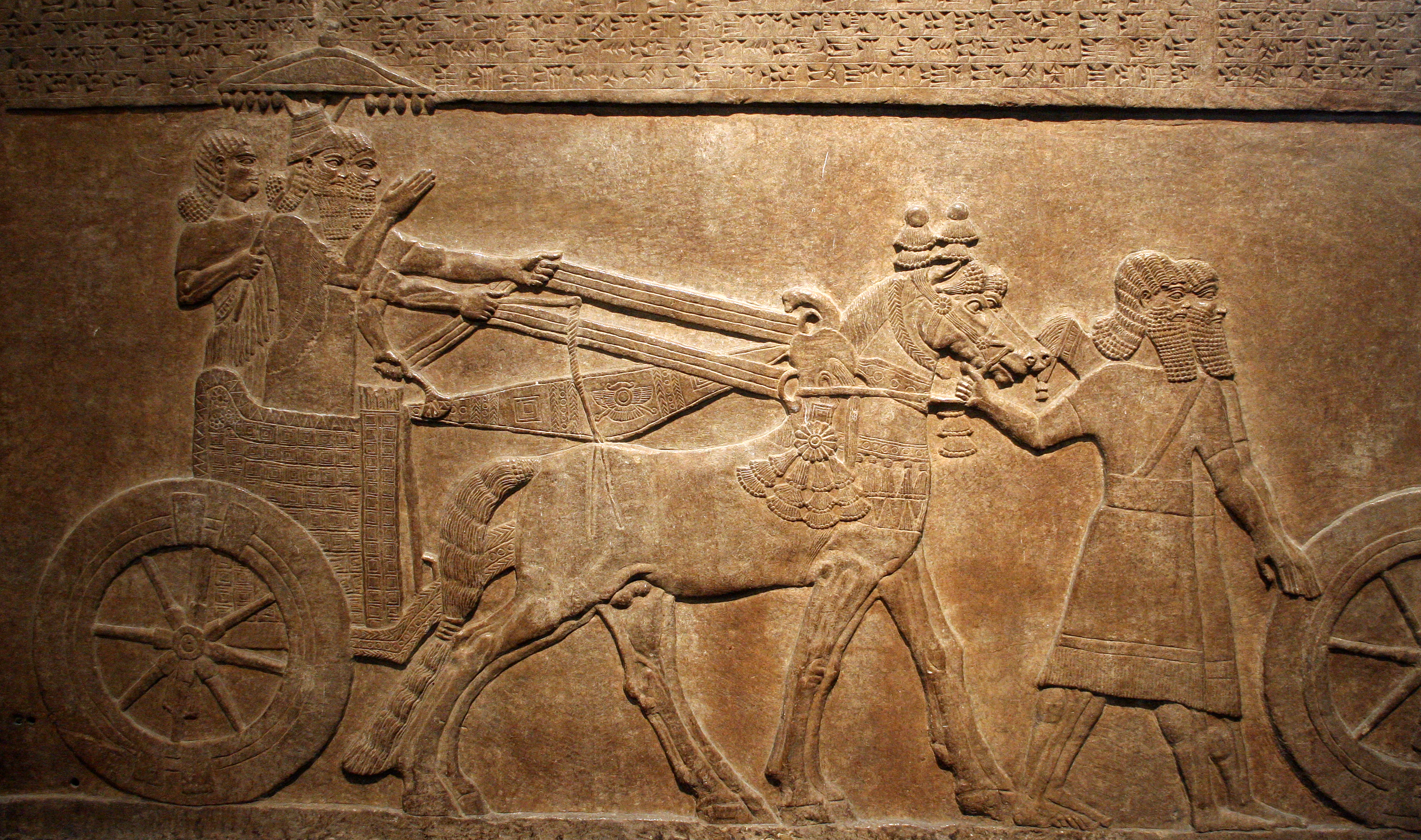
The capture of the city of Astartu, thought to be Ashteroth, in the land east of the Jordan River of king Og of Bashan, by the Neo-Assyrian emperor Tiglath-Pileser III about 730–727 BCE, as depicted on a palace relief now kept on display in the British Museum.

Ashteroth Karnaim was a city east of the Jordan River in Bashan in the northern part of the Transjordan. (Note: Biblical Hebrew: עַשְׁתְּרֹת קַרְנַיִם, romanized: ʿAštəroṯ Qarnayim, lit. 'Two-Horned Astarte'.)

There were originally two neighbouring cities, Ashtaroth, and northeast of it Karnaim, the latter annexing the name of the former after Ashtaroth's decline and becoming known as Ashteroth Karnaim.

Eusebius (c. 260/265–340) writes of Karneia/Karnaia, a large village in Arabia Petraea, where a house of Job was identified by tradition.

== Etymology ==
The name translates literally to "Astarte of the Two Horns". Astarte was a goddess of civilisation and fertility in Canaanite religion.

== Ashteroth in the Assyrian relief ==
Tell Ashtara is mentioned in the Assyrian relief in 730/727 BCE, which is in the British Museum. The relief depicts the Assyrians removing the people from Ashteroth in 730–727 BC. The relief was excavated at Nimrud by Austen Henry Layard in 1851. The name Ashteroth is inscribed in cuneiform on the top of the relief. The king in the lower register is Tiglath-Pileser III. This event is known as the Assyrian captivity. It is mentioned in 2 Kings 15:29: "In the days of King Pekah of Israel, King Tiglath-pileser of Assyria came and captured Ijon, Abel-beth-maachah, Janohah, Kedesh, Hazor-Gilead, Galilee, the entire region of Naphtali; and he deported the inhabitants to Assyria."

The floppy turbans and pointed shoes and the style of the cloaks are typical for the Northern Kingdom in this period; the same clothes are shown on the Black Obelisk of Shalmaneser III. The Black Obelisk is dated to about 825 BCE. It was also excavated at Nimrud by Austen Henry Layard in 1848. It shows Jehu, King of Northern Israel, or his representative offering tribute to Shalmaneser III on the second register down.

== Biblical references ==
Ashteroth Karnaim was mentioned under this name ahead of the account of the Battle of Siddim in Genesis 14, which records that "Chedorlaomer and the kings who were with him came and defeated the Rephaim in Ashteroth-karnaim." The allied kings defeat a series of peoples before the battle in the Valley of Siddim where Sodom and Gomorrah are sacked.

In Joshua 12:4, the place is rendered simply as "Ashtaroth". Karnaim is also mentioned by the prophet Amos in Amos 6:13, where those in Israel boast that they have captured the place for themselves.

Karnaim/Ashteroth Karnaim is considered to be the same as the Karnein of the Hellenistic period mentioned in 2 Maccabees 12:21, rendered in the King James Version as Carnion, and possibly as "Carnaim" in 1 Maccabees.

== Identification ==
The identification of the two sites is not straightforward, but there is some degree of consensus.

=== Ashtaroth ===
- Tell Ashtara, north of the Yarmouk, is a site considered to be identical with Ashtaroth, a city mentioned in several ancient Egypt sources: the Execration texts, Amarna letters (mid-14th century BCE) and the campaign list of Ramesses III (r. 1186 to 1155 BCE). The city appears in Amarna letters EA 256 and EA 197 as Aš-tar-te/ti. In the Hebrew Bible it is mentioned as the capital of Og, King of Bashan (Joshua 9:10 etc.) and as part of the territory of Manasseh (Joshua 13:31).

=== Karnaim/Ashteroth Karnaim ===
All sites identified by different scholars at different times as Karnaim/Ashteroth Karnaim lie in the area of Daraa in modern Syria.

- Al-Shaykh Saad is widely seen as the site of Ashteroth Karnaim.

Other possible sites proposed in the past are:

- Al Churak, a site proposed by 14th-century topographer and traveller Ishtori Haparchi, aka Astori Pharchi, being eight miles northeast of the ancient ruins known as 'Draä';
- Muzayrib, an ancient fortress town.

== See also ==
- Asherah

== Bibliography ==
- Negev, Avraham; Gibson, Shimon (2005). Archaeological Encyclopedia of the Holy Land. Continuum International Publishing Group. p. 277. ISBN 9780826485717.
- Eusebius of Caesarea (1971). Wolf, Umhau C. (ed.). Onomasticon (Concerning the Place Names in Sacred Scripture). "Karnaeim. Astaroth Karnaeim. There is now a large village of Arabia (in a corner of the Batanea) which is called Karnaia beyond the (river) Jordan. There according to tradition the house of Job is pointed out."
- Wolf, Umhau C., ed. (1971). Eusebius of Caesarea, Onomasticon: Notes. "The two villages are best located at Tell 'ashtarah and Sheih Sa'ad. The former is a large tell suitable for the Old Testament Ashtaroth (cf. K. 12:11). Perhaps the latter succeeded as chief administrative city of the district of Karnaeim (cf. K. 112:3). However in the Bible, Astaroth is merely identifying the site of a battle which took place near the city. If so, then Karnaeim added to the name gives the district in which the battle took place (cf. Biblical Archaeologist Dec. 1962, p.109). Eusebius seems to look for two sites."
- Gershon Galil (1998). Isre'el, Singer and Zadok (ed.). Israel Oriental Studies XVIII - Past Links: Studies in the Languages and Cultures of the Ancient Near East. Eisenbrauns. p. 373. ISBN 1-57506-035-3.
