= Flight to Pella =

Early Christian tradition about the Jerusalem Church

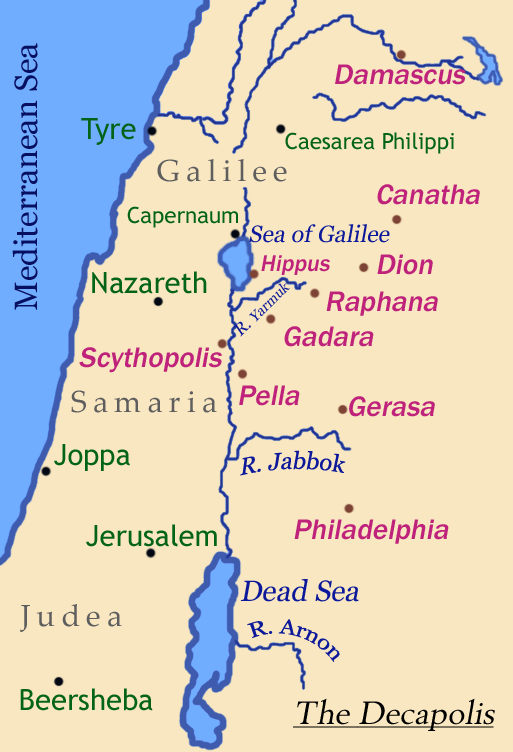
Map of the Decapolis with Jerusalem and Pella visible.

The flight to Pella is an early Christian tradition that the Early Church of Jerusalem fled to the city of Pella before the destruction of Jerusalem in AD 70 during the First Jewish–Roman War. Pella was in the region of the Decapolis and across the Jordan River. The earliest surviving reference to this is from the fourth-century Church Father Eusebius of Caesarea; the 4th century writer Epiphanius of Salamis also cites this tradition. The flight to Pella probably did not include the Ebionites.

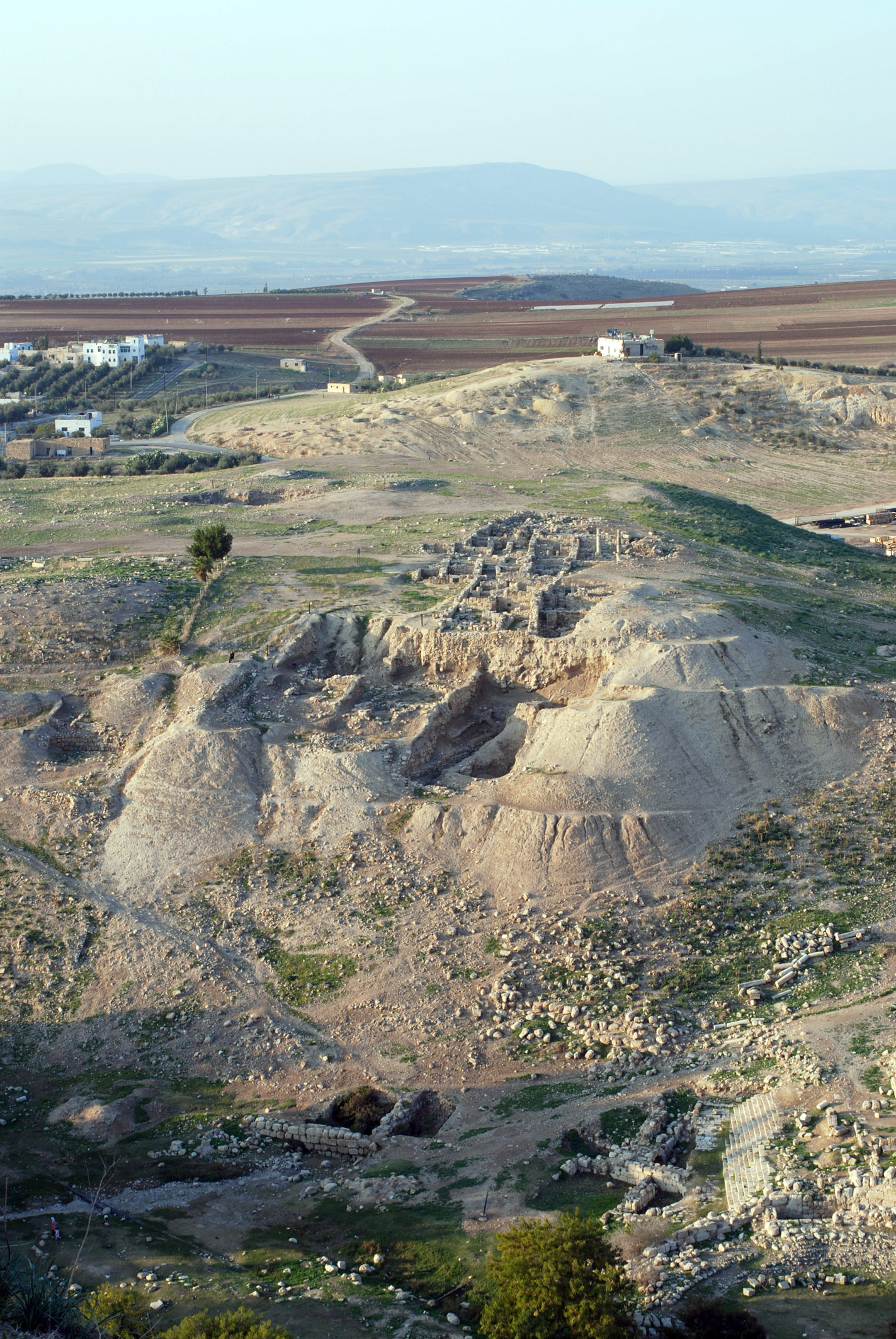
Remnants of Pella.

The authenticity of this tradition became a debated question in the 20th century. S. G. F. Brandon argued in 1951 that the flight to Pella most likely did not happen and that the original Jerusalem Church was wiped out, which to him would explain the loss in prestige of Jewish Christianity and the growth of Pauline Christianity as the dominant and organized form afterward. Gerd Lüdemann has argued that it was more likely Eusebius was recounting a 2nd-century legend by some Jewish Christian church in Palestine that sought to buttress its legitimacy by claiming a continuing link to the early Jerusalem Church. Still, many other scholars accept the basic parameters of such an escape as plausible.

== Ancient sources ==
The oldest source is from Eusebius's book Church History, published in the early 4th century (c. 310–335). He implies the flight happened before the First Jewish–Roman War (c. 66), rather than immediately before the siege. He also makes it part of a moral where wicked Jews are punished and Christians are saved.

The people of the church in Jerusalem, in accordance with a certain oracle that was given through revelation to those who were worthy in the place, were commanded to migrate from the city before the war and to settle in a certain city of Perea—Pella it was called—to which those who believed in Christ migrated from Jerusalem, so that when holy men had completely abandoned the royal capital of the Jews and the whole land of Judea, the judgment of God might at last overtake them for all their crimes against the Christ and his apostles, utterly blotting out that very generation of the wicked from among humankind.

— Eusebius, Church History Book 3, Chapter 5, 3

The heresiologist Epiphanius of Salamis references it three times, writing in the late 4th century. It is not known whether Epiphanius had read Eusebius, or was relying on an independent, lost source; Gerd Lüdemann argues he was likely relying on Eusebius, while Craig Koester argues it was likely an independent tradition.

This heresy of the Nazoraeans exists in Beroea in the neighborhood of Coele Syria and the Decapolis in the region of Pella and in Basanitis in the so-called Kokaba (Chochabe in Hebrew). From there it took its beginning after the exodus from Jerusalem when all the disciples went to live in Pella because Christ had told them to leave Jerusalem and to go away since it would undergo a siege. Because of this advice they lived in Perea after having moved to that place, as I said.

— Epiphanius, Panarion 29,7,7-8

For after all those who believed in Christ had generally come to live in Perea, in a city called Pella of the Decapolis of which it is written in the Gospel that it is situated in the neighborhood of the region of Batanaea and Basanitis, Ebion's preaching originated here after they had moved to this place and had lived there.

— Epiphanius, Panarion 30, 2, 7

So Aquila, while he was in Jerusalem, also saw the disciples of the disciples of the apostles flourishing in the faith and working great signs, healings, and other miracles. For they were such as had come back from the city of Pella to Jerusalem and were living there and teaching. For when the city was about to be taken and destroyed by the Romans, it was revealed in advance to all the disciples by an angel of God that they should remove from the city, as it was going to be completely destroyed. They sojourned as emigrants in Pella, the city above mentioned in Transjordania. And this city is said to be of the Decapolis.

— Epiphanius, On Weights and Measures 15

While not a direct source on an alleged flight to Pella, the late 1st century Gospel of Luke features some related verses. Luke 21 verses 20-22 can be read as hinting at something similar. It seems to be referring to the Jewish-Roman War, and says that when Jerusalem is surrounded by armies, those who are in Judea should flee into the mountains.

== Historicity ==
Traditionalist Christian scholars did not generally question the historicity of Eusebius's claim in the 19th century and before. The first major challenge came in 1951, where S. G. F. Brandon argued in his work The Fall of Jerusalem and the Christian Church that the Jerusalem Christians were more likely to have been allied with the Zealots and still firmly Jewish; for Brandon, they would have held their ground and been destroyed with the other defenders of the city. According to Brandon, it was after the destruction of the Jewish Christian leadership in Jerusalem (the de-facto leaders of the earliest church) that the more universalist Pauline Christianity triumphed as the dominant form. In general, most scholars have been skeptical of the existence of such a Jewish Christian–Zealot alliance, but others have questioned the historicity of the flight to Pella on other grounds.

Gerd Lüdemann has also argued that the flight was most likely not historical. The most pressing issue is that Eusebius's reference is rather late, coming 250 years after the claimed event. Lüdemann does not think Eusebius fabricated the tradition himself, given that he only mentions it once and does not mention it in other passages where it would be relevant or to further some theological goal. However, in the theological disputes of early Christianity (and even medieval and modern Christianity), one of the most common ways to bolster the theological authority of a church was to claim direct descent from the apostles. This is seen in the multitude of pseudepigrapha, letters and documents falsely claiming the authorship of some apostle or other notable, trustworthy figure (and denounced by surviving writings of figures like Epiphanius). As such, a Christian group in Palestine could well have been incentivized to claim descent from the Early Church of Jerusalem, which would require continuity and the Jerusalem church somehow surviving the destruction of the city. This church's tradition then survived to be recorded by Eusebius – perhaps from the mysterious Ariston of Pella, a Jewish Christian mentioned elsewhere in his writings.

Craig Koester has argued that a Flight to Pella is plausible. He explains the lack of surviving early sources as related to the same thread the skeptics mention: the loss of prestige of Jewish Christianity that kept Jewish law, and the rise of Pauline Christianity as the dominant form of Christianity. Given that this happened, regardless of the reasons, there simply was little interest from pagans-converted-to-Christianity in the stories of the continuity of the Jewish Christian church, explaining the paucity of sources to Koester.
