= Finger of Og =

Stone pillar in Jerusalem

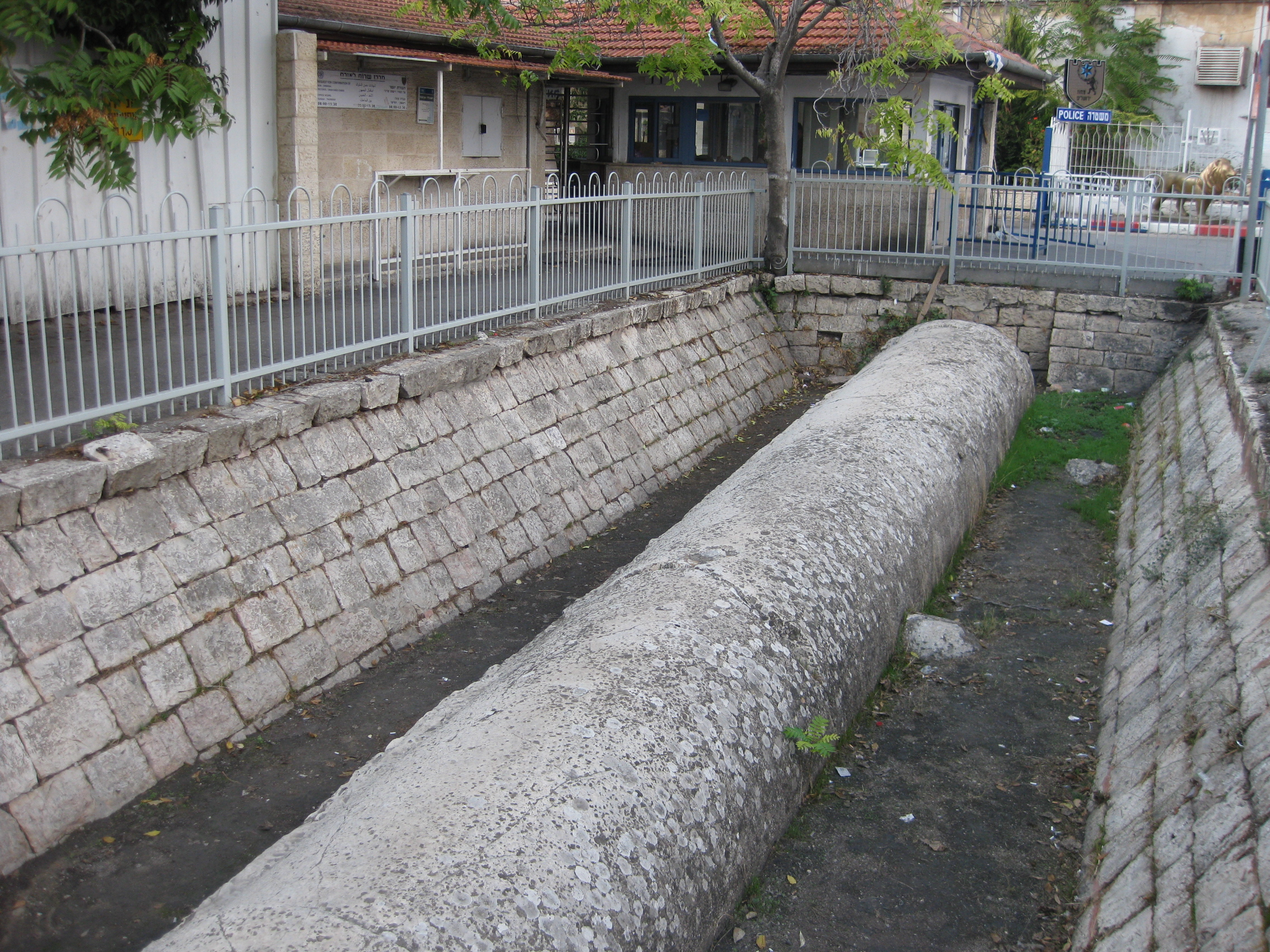

- Location within Jerusalem
- 31°46′53.4″N 35°13′20.5″E
- Type: pillar
- Location: Jerusalem

Site notes
- Material: local stone
- Length: 12 metres (39 ft)

The Finger of Og a huge stone pillar, sometimes called Herod's Pillar, which lies in front of the Russian Compound in Jerusalem. Its name is a reference to the giant Og, King of Bashan, as described in the Hebrew Bible.

The column measures 12 m (39 ft) long and is thought to have been intended for use in either Herod's Temple, or the later Byzantine Nea Church. Its upper surface is partially dressed and the discovery of a flaw appears to be the reason it was abandoned and left in-situ.

== See also ==
- Levantine archaeology
