= Stephen Bourke =

Australian archaeologist

Stephen Bourke is an Australian archaeologist of the ancient Near East. He obtained his Ph.D. from University College London in 1992, and is an Honorary Fellow of the Council for British Research in the Levant.

Bourke has led the ongoing University of Sydney excavations at Pella in Jordan since 1992. Previously, Bourke also directed the university's excavations at Teleilat el Ghassul.
