= ʿAnāq (daughter of Adam) =

Evil character in some Islamic theologies

ʿAnāq bint Ādam (أناق/عَنّاق بنت آدم) is, in some varieties of Islamic theology, a daughter of Adam and Eve. She is portrayed as evil. In some accounts, she is the first child of Adam and Eve.

== Summary of traditions ==
A summary of the diverse traditions about ʿAnāq is provided by Roberto Tottoli:

According to some reports ʿAnāq was born alone, with no twin brother, or, in other reports, she was Cain's sister, and he, after killing Abel, brought her to Yemen, where he married her ... She was said to be the first one to commit fornication and to act badly on earth and because of this she was later killed. Some traditions add particulars about her monstrous appearance, such as that she had two heads, or twenty fingers with two nails each, or that she had long nails. It is also stated that she was the first person killed on earth, and that she was killed by ravaging beasts or by a gigantic lion sent by God. The name ʿAnāq is usually employed in connection with the story of her son ʿŪj, the giant who survived the Flood and was later killed by Moses.

== Significance of name ==
ʿAnāq's name seems to correspond in some way to male giant Anak in Hebrew tradition. However, her name can also be understood to mean 'misfortune' or 'calamity' or to evoke the word ʿināq ('embrace'). However, the word also means 'caracal' (a kind of lynx) (more usually in the fuller form ʿanāq al-arḍ).

== Example ḥadīth ==
One Shia ḥadīth mentioning ʿAnāq, for example, is the following, included in al-Kāfī by Muḥammad ibn Yaʿqūb al-Kulaynī (864–941 CE), where Muḥammad attributes the material to ʿAlī, and translated by Amina Inloes.

O people! Corruption (بغي, baghy) leads its perpetrator to the Fire. The first to commit [the crime of] corruption against Allah was ʿAnāq, the daughter of Adam. She was the first person whom Allah killed, and she used to inhabit a place made of earth. She had twenty fingers; on each finger were two claws like two sickles. So Allah set upon her a vulture like a mule, and it overpowered her like a lion overpowers an elephant, or a wolf overpowers a camel. So We killed her, and thus Allah has killed the tyrants when they were in their best condition and secure in their positions.

== Cultural significance ==
The role of ʿAnāq in extra-Quranic traditions can be seen as similar to that of Lilith in extrabiblical Judaeo-Christian traditions, providing a monstrous female near the very beginning of human existence, through whom misogynistic ideology can be conveyed.

== Occurrences in major authorities ==
- al-Damīrī, Ḥayāt al-ḥayawān al-kubrā (Cairo 1978), 2:76–9
- al-Jāḥiẓ, Le Kitāb at-tarbīʿ wa-t-tadwīr de Ğāḥiẓ, ed. by C. Pellat (Damas: Institut Français de Damas, 1955), p. 30 [§47].
- al-Kisāʾī, Qiṣaṣ al-anbiyāʾ, ed. Isaac Eisenberg (Leiden 1922–23), 233
- Kulaynī, Muḥammad ibn Yaʿqūb al-, al-Kāfī, 8 vols (Tehran: Dār al-Kutub al-Islāmiyyah, 1367 AH (solar)), 2:327, no. 4.
- Majlisī, Muḥammad Bāqir al-, Biḥār al-nwār al-Jāmiʿahli-Durar Akhbār al-Aʾimmat al-Aṭhār [The Oceans of Lights: A Compendium of the Pearls of the Narrations of the Pure Imāms], 110 vols (Beirut: Muʾassasat al-Wafāʾ, 1983), 11:226 no. 6 (citing Kitāb al-Mukhtaṣir li al-Ḥasan bin Sulaymān), pp. 237–38; 11:237 no. 21 (citing Tafsīr al-Qummī).
- Maʿlūf, Amīn, Muʿjam al-ḥayawān (Beirut 1985), 49–51
- al-Masʿūdī, L'Abrégé des merveilles, ed. and trans. Bernard Carra de Vaux (Paris 1984), pp. 133–34 [trans. from K. Akhbār al-zamān wa-man abādahu 'l-ḥidthān min al-umam al-māḍiya wa'l- adjyāl al-khāliya wa'l-mamālik al-dāthira]
- Muqātil ibn Sulaymān, Tafsīr, ed. ʿAbdallāh Maḥmūd Shiḥāta (Cairo 1979–88), 1:465–66
- al-Thaʿlabī, Qiṣaṣ al-anbiyāʾ (Cairo 1954), 44.
