= Shutu =

Ancient nomadic groups of the Transjordanian highlands

Shutu (/ˈʃuːtuː/ or Sutu /ˈsuːtuː/) is the name given in ancient Akkadian language sources to certain nomadic groups of the Transjordanian highlands, extending deep into Mesopotamia and Southern Iraq. Some scholars have speculated that "Shutu" may be a variant of the Egyptian term Shasu.

An Egyptian execration text of the 17th century BCE refers to an "Ayyab" (possibly a variant form of the name Job) as king of the Shutu. Some scholars have tenuously identified the Shutu as the progenitors of the Moabites and Ammonites.

== See also ==
- Ayyab
- ʿApiru
- Suteans

== Bibliography ==
- Baikie, James. The Amarna Age: A Study of the Crisis of the Ancient World. University Press of the Pacific, 2004.
- Cohen, Raymond and Raymond Westbrook (eds.). Amarna Diplomacy: The Beginnings of International Relations. Johns Hopkins University Press, 2002.
- Moran, William L. (ed. and trans.) The Amarna Letters. Johns Hopkins University Press, 1992. ISBN 0-8018-4251-4.
- Redford, Donald. Egypt, Canaan and Israel in Ancient Times. Princeton: Princeton University Press, 1992. ISBN 0-691-00086-7.
- Rainey, Anson. The Sacred Bridge. Carta, 2005. ISBN 978-9652205292
