= Mutbaal =

Canaanite king of the Amarna Period

King of Pella
- Reign: c. 1350 BC
- Father: Labaya

Mutbaal (Akk. "man of Baal"; fl. c. 1350 BC) was a Canaanite king of the Amarna Period. He is identified in the Amarna letters as a son of Labaya, the king of Shechem.

Mutbaal may be the son whose association with the Habiru raiders Labaya denounced in EA 254. He ruled in Pella on the eastern side of the Jordan River. After his father's death at the hands of the citizens of Gina, Mutbaal and his brother continued their assaults on other Canaanite rulers and their holdings, employing Habiru mercenaries. Eventually, Biryawaza of Damascus was ordered by the Egyptian court to take armed action against the sons of Labaya. (EA 250)

== List of Mutbaal's 2 letters to Pharaoh ==
=== EA 255 ===
Mutbaal letter no. 1 of 2, title: "No destination too far" Letter 255 by Mutbaal, about caravans, seems to imply that his location in western Jordan (as "Mayor of Pihilu", the modern city Pella in Jordan) was an important trade route to the east to Babylonia, or north to Mittani.

Say [t]o the king, [my] lord and my Sun: Thus Mut-Bahl[u], your servant, the dirt at your feet, the mire you tread on. I fall at the feet of the king, my lord, 7 times and 7 times. The king, my lord, sent Haaya to me to say, "A caravan to Hanagalbat-(Mitanni), is this (man) to send on, and (all of you) send it on!" Who am I that I would not send on a caravan of the king, my lord, seeing that [La]b 'ayu, my father, [used to ser]ve the king, his lord, [and] he [himself] used to send on [all the carav]ans [that] the king [would se]nd to Hanagalbat. Let the king, my lord, send a caravan even to Karaduniyaš. I will personally conduct it under very heavy guard. -EA 255, lines 1-25 (complete)

=== EA 256 ===
EA 256; title: "Oaths and denials".
EA 256 is about Mutbaal, and Pella (Pihilu); a list of cities in the letter, in the Golan Heights=(Garu)—Udumu, Aduru, Araru, Mešta-(Meshta), Magdalu, Heni-anabi-(Kheni-anabi), Sarqu, Hayyunu, and Yabiluma. People mentioned in this letter include Dadua, Yishuya and Ayab, whom Rohl identifies with David, Jesse, and Joab.

== Speculations ==
David Rohl identifies Mutbaal with Ish-bosheth, the son of the Israelite King Saul, but the chronology that would make this identification feasible is not accepted by the majority of scholars. It cannot be denied that the names have exactly the same meaning, but two people may have the same name and still belong to different time-periods. But of both Mutbaal son of Labaya and of Ishbosheth son of Saul it can be said that, though his father ruled from Shechem, he himself ruled from Pella.

David Rohl believes that it would not have been Mutbaal, but Jonathan who displeased Labaya by associating with the Habiru. Mutbaal's brother in the post-Labaya period would be David, his brother-in-law.

== Resources ==
- Baikie, James. The Amarna Age: A Study of the Crisis of the Ancient World. University Press of the Pacific, 2004.
- Cohen, Raymond and Raymond Westbrook (eds.). Amarna Diplomacy: The Beginnings of International Relations. Johns Hopkins University Press, 2002.
- Moran, William L. (ed. and trans.) The Amarna Letters. Johns Hopkins University Press, 2002.
