= Pella, Jordan =

Ancient city in Jordan

Pella
- Πέλλα (Greek)
- Fihl, Tabaqat Fahl
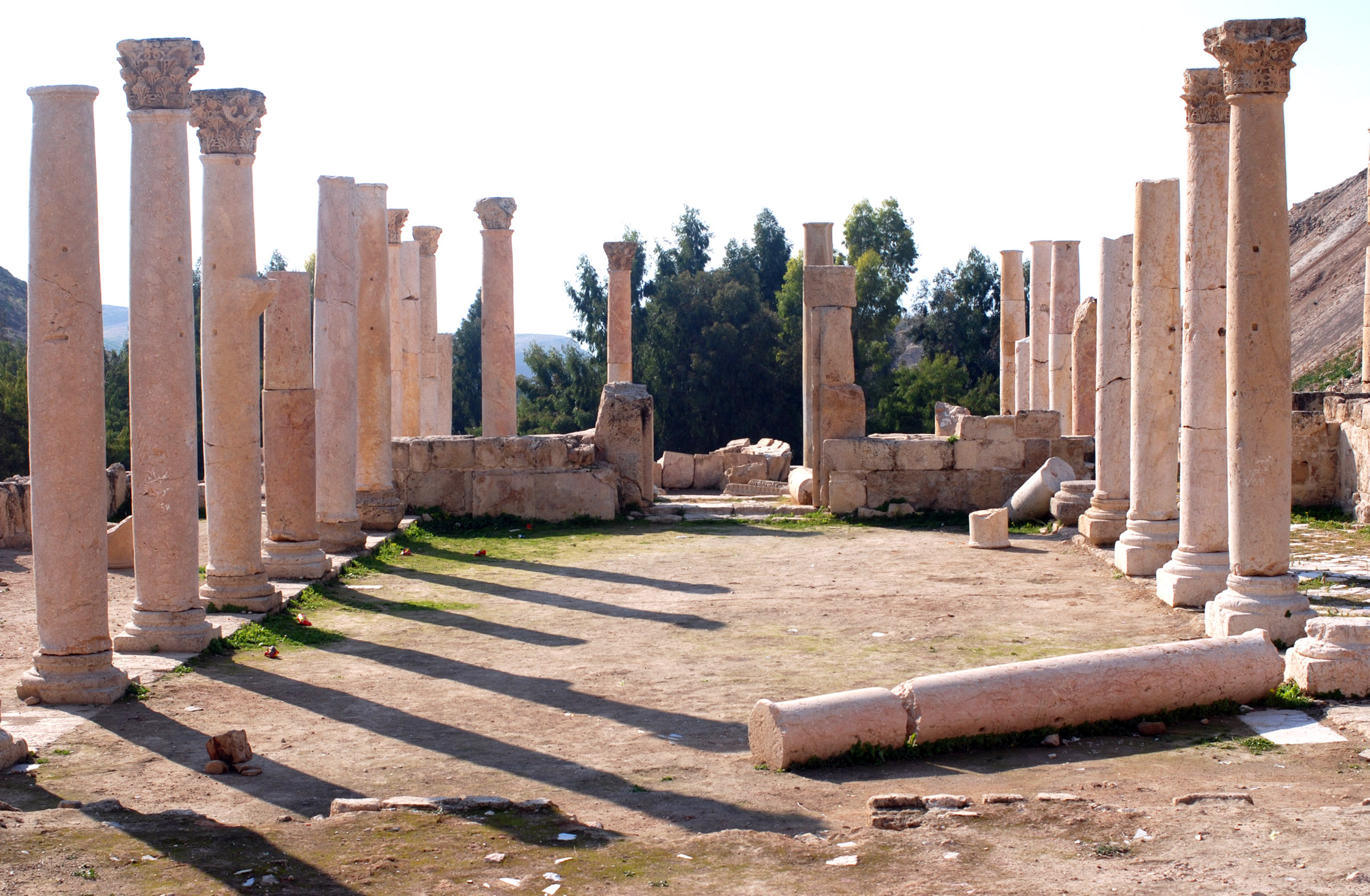
- Byzantine Basilica in Pella.

- Location within Jordan
- 32°27′N 35°37′E
- Type: Settlement
- Location: Irbid Governorate, Jordan
- Region: Levant

Site notes
- Owner: Government of Jordan
- Management: Department of Antiquities of Jordan

Pella (Greek: Πέλλα, Arabic: فحل) was an ancient city in what is now northwest Jordan, and contains ruins from the Neolithic, Chalcolithic, Bronze Age, Iron Age, Canaanite, Hellenistic and Islamic periods. It is located near a rich water source within the eastern foothills of the Jordan Valley, close to the modern village of Ṭabaqat Faḥl (Arabic: طبقة فحل) some 27 km (17 mi) south of the Sea of Galilee (Lake Tiberias). The site is situated 130 km (81 mi) north of Amman: a drive of about two hours (due to the difficult terrain), and an hour southwest by car from Irbid, in the north of the country. Pella's ruins – predominantly temples, churches, and housing – have been partially excavated by teams of archaeologists; they attract thousands of tourists annually but especially in spring, during which time the area is awash with spring flowers.

== Tourism ==
During the Roman period, Pella was a thriving city with evidence of urban planning, public spaces, and luxurious villas. The city’s location along ancient trade routes contributed to its prosperity.

== Name ==
The Semitic name of the ancient, pre-Hellenistic site, was Pahil or Pihil. Pehal is the name under which the city is mentioned in early Egyptian (Bronze Age) historical texts.

The Arab geographer of Greek origin, Yaqut (1179–1229), could find no Arabic meaning for the modern name Fahl and believed it to be of foreign origin.

Pella is the name of Alexander the Great's birthplace in Macedonia. It is not known (as of 2006) who founded the Hellenistic town of Pella in Transjordan, which makes it hard to assess who exactly gave it its Greek name and precisely why. Stephanos (fl. 6th century CE), a quite late source, seems to indicate that it was founded by Alexander himself, and Ptolemy III Euergetes is another possible founder. The Princeton Encyclopedia of Classical Sites write that it was founded by veterans of Alexander's army, and named it after the Pella in Greece which was the birthplace of Alexander. Getzel M. Cohen sees it as plausible that the name Pella was chosen either due to its similarity with the older Semitic name, or due to a common characteristic of both the Macedonian and Transjordan sites: their richness in springs. For the Greek meaning of the name, see the Etymology paragraph in the article on the original Pella. The town is said to have been called Pihilum.

Berenike in Greek, often Latinised to Berenice, is another name of Pella from the Hellenistic period, based on only one source: Stephanos. The Macedonian name Berenike was often used in the royal family of Ptolemaic Egypt, who conquered southern Syria and thus Pella in 301, and ruled over the city until 218 BCE, when they lost it to the Seleucid king Antiochos III. It is not possible to assess after which Ptolemid the city was renamed, possible candidates being the wife of Ptolemy I, a daughter of Ptolemy II, and the wife of Ptolemy III. Cohen presumes that under Seleucid rule, the city reverted right away to being called Pella.

Philippeia is another name of the city from the Roman period, seen by Cohen as an attempt of claiming Marcius Philippus as its founder as a reaction to other cities in the region claiming an illustrious, but fictitious pedigree.

== History and archaeology ==
Pella has been almost continuously occupied since Neolithic times. During the Hellenistic period, the town formed with other like-minded towns in the region a political and cultural league known as the "Decapolis", an alliance that grew in stature and economic importance to become regionally influential under Roman jurisdiction. However, Pella expanded to its largest size during the Byzantine period, when it was a bishopric in the province of Palaestina Secunda. In Islamic times, after 635 CE, the town became part of the Jund al-Urdunn (Province of Jordan), but in time was negatively impacted by natural calamities and eclipsed by the geo-political successes of the nearby towns of Amman, Beisan and especially Tabariyah (Tiberias).

=== Neolithic ===
The University of Sydney's Pella Excavation Project discovered at Tabaqat Fahl the remains of Neolithic housing dated to ca. 6000 BCE.

=== Chalcolithic ===
The Australian teams also found storage complexes from the Chalcolithic period (ca. 4200 BCE). Since being headed by Stephen Bourke in the 1990s, the excavation has been focusing on the site's Bronze Age and Iron Age temples and administrative buildings.

=== Early Bronze ===
In May 2010 Bourke announced to the press the discovery of a city wall and other structures dating back to 3400 BCE and some even to 3600 BCE, indicating that the city standing at the top of Pella's Tell Husn at the time was a "formidable" city-state around 3400-3200 BCE, at the same time the cities of Sumer were taking shape. The official University of Sydney excavation page only mentions Early Bronze Age stone defensive platforms from ca. 3200 BCE.

=== Middle Bronze ===
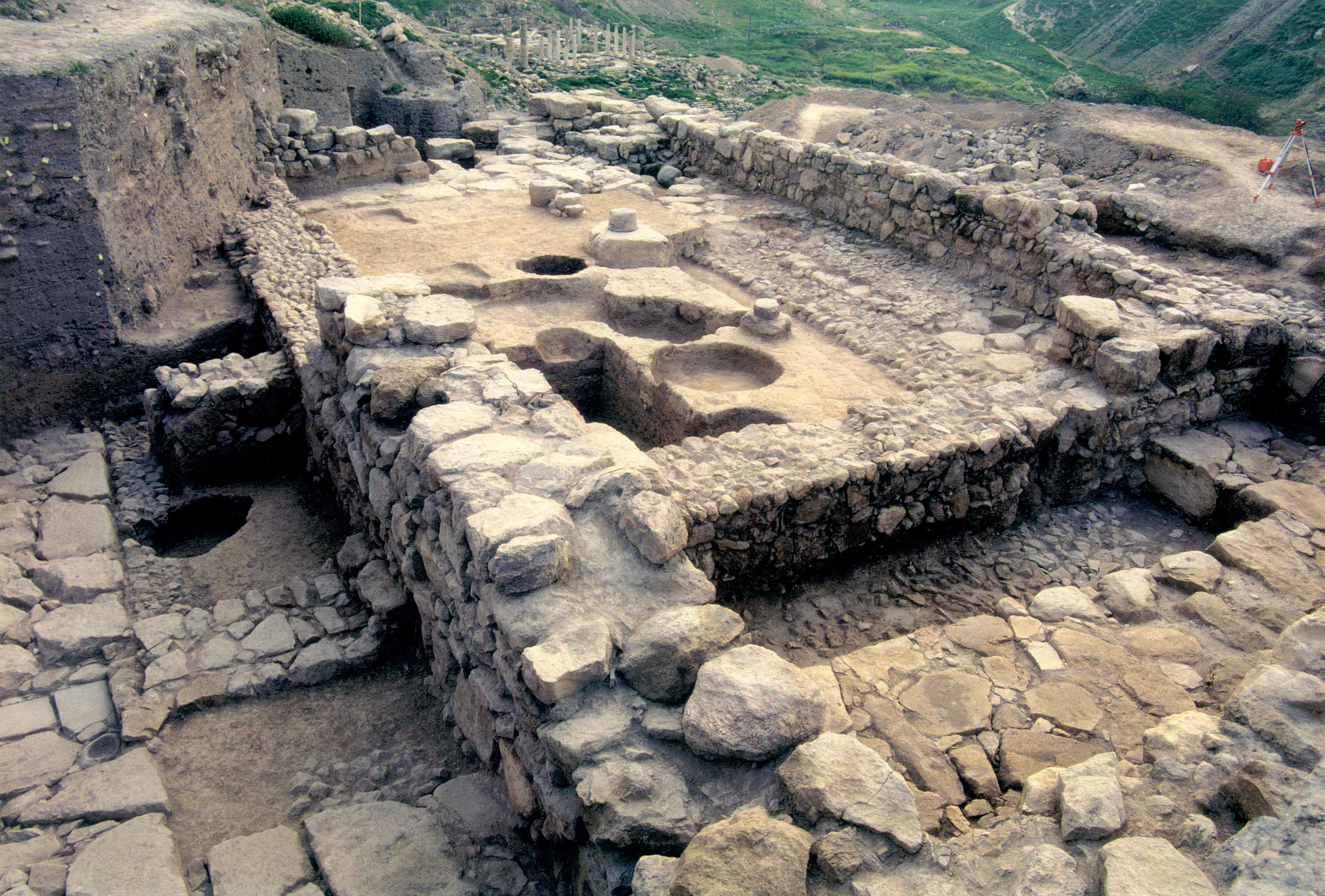
Migdol-type temple at Pella, first built in the Middle Bronze Age (1650 BCE) and destroyed in the Iron Age (850 BCE), 2001

The Middle Bronze Age IIA city of ca. 1800 BCE boasted massive mud-brick city walls. Australian archaeologists also discovered Middle and Late Bronze Age temples and palatial residences (ca. 1800-1200 BCE). The city was first mentioned in the 19th century BCE in Egyptian execration texts, and it continued to flourish throughout the Bronze Age. A Canaanite temple was uncovered during the 1994-2003 campaigns.

=== Late Bronze ===
In the Amarna Period (c. 1350 BC), Pella was the site of an Egyptian "governor's residence" containing clay tablets. The Amarna Archive contains letters showing that the city was ruled by Mutbaal, a son of Labaya of Shechem. Apparently, they rebelled and expanded their territory and associated with the Habiru.

=== Iron Age ===
The urban heart of the Iron Age city-kingdom seems to have suffered a major destruction in the later 9th century, from which it did not recover.

=== Hellenistic period ===
Re-established as an urban centre under the early Seleucids, its ancient name must still have been known, for its new, Greek name was a close synonym, Pella – the birthplace of Alexander the Great in Macedon.

As yet no public buildings from the Hellenistic period have been identified, although well-appointed private houses attest to their integration into the wider norms of urban living, such as wall-paintings and statuary. Several of these houses suffered what appears to be the same fiery destruction in the Late Hellenistic period. This has been attributed to a massive destruction by the Hasmonean king, Alexander Jannaeus, about 83 or 82 BCE (Josephus, The Jewish War 14.4.8; Antiquities 14.4.4). From Josephus, it is clear that Pella had been damaged and so needed some restoration by Pompey decades afterwards, but his specific reference to the destruction of Pella by Jannaeus because its inhabitants refusing to follow Jewish customs, seems to refer to a different place (Antiquities, XIII.395-397): it is listed as if amongst southern Levantine cities and out of its more normal sequence between Gadara, Gerasa and Scythopolis.

=== Roman period ===
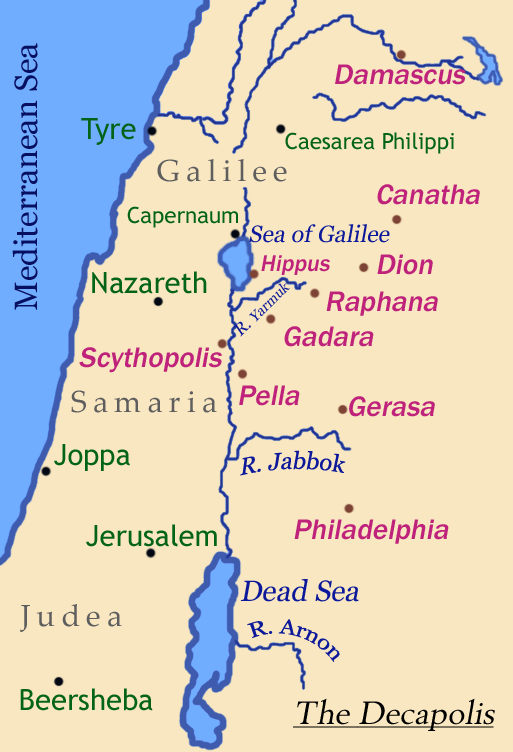
Map of the Decapolis showing the location of Pella

In 63 BCE, the Roman General Pompey integrated the region into the Eastern portion of the Roman Empire, converting the old Seleucid empire into the province of Coele-Syria and incorporating Judaea as a client kingdom. A group of cities claiming Greek Hellenistic foundations asked Pompey to avoid incorporation within Rome's new client-state of Hasmonaean Judaea. Pompey agreed, and these cities were called the Decapolis – literally, the ten cities – although the lists which have survived vary in composition and number. Pella, however, is consistently a "Decapolis" city, and the city in the northernmost bounds of the region known as Perea. If these cities had previously dated their years from their foundation under Alexander the Great or Seleucis I Nicator, they now honoured Pompey by counting 63 BC as a new "Year One". Like most cities within the empire, Pella would have had its own town council. It also minted coins in the Roman period.

Pella was incorporated within Roman Judaean territory (Jewish Wars 3.5). According to Josephus, the Roman governor of Syria Marcus Aemilius Scaurus "laid waste the country around Pella" (The Jewish War 1.8.1). Pella was one of eleven administrative districts (toparchies) in Roman Judea. During the outbreak of the First Jewish-Roman War, when the Syrian inhabitants of Caesarea had slain its Jewish citizens, there was a general Jewish uprising against neighboring Syrian villages, who sought revenge for the murder of their countrymen, during which time Pella was ransacked and destroyed. Growing Jewish dissent over Roman military occupation in Judea brought about Roman reprisals against Jewish enclaves in the regions of Galilee, the coastal plains of Judea, Idumea and Perea, until, at length, the Roman army had subdued all insurgents and their military governors established during the Jewish revolt.

University of Sydney digs unearthed the theatre, baths, and nymphaeum of the Roman city of ca. 150 CE.

==== First Christians: the "flight to Pella" ====
In what is known as the "flight to Pella", sometime before the Roman destruction of Jerusalem in 70 CE, tradition holds that a Jewish-Christian sect of Nazoreans made their way to Pella and settled in the city which became a Jewish Christian hub during the early days of Christianity. According to Epiphanius, the disciples had been miraculously told by Christ to abandon Jerusalem because of the siege it was about to undergo.

Epiphanius claims that after the destruction, some returned to Jerusalem. Similarly to Epiphanius, Eusebius of Caesarea recounts how Pella was a refuge for Jerusalem Christians who were fleeing the First Jewish–Roman War in the 1st century CE. Pella is alleged to have been the site of one of Christianity's earliest churches, but no evidence has been found of this. According to historian Edward Gibbon, the early Church of Jerusalem fled to Pella after the ruin of the temple, staying there until their return during the reign of Emperor Hadrian, making it a secondary pilgrimage site for early Christians and modern Christians today.

=== Byzantine period ===
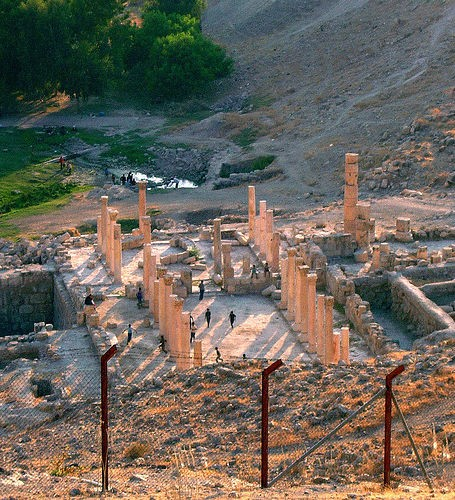
Children playing football in the ancient ruins of Pella in September 2004.

In the late Roman and Byzantine periods, the town extended over the ancient tell (archaeological mound), across the broad central valley of the town today known as the Wadi al-Jirm (see photograph), and over the slopes and summit of the southern hill known as Tell al-Husn. By the Byzantine era, Pella had reached its maximum size and, probably, prosperity. Being part of the province of Palaestina Secunda ("second Palestine"), it certainly had a bishop by the year AD 451. At least three triapsidal churches have been identified within the city: the West Church at the western foot of the tell; the Civic Complex church in the Wadi al-Jirm at the southeast foot of the tell and which, due to its size and location, was probably the cathedral; and the elevated East Church on the higher slopes of the Jebel Abu el-Khas. A Bishop's palace from ca. 550 CE was also discovered. On the tell, the entire summit was leveled off and a new gridded urban zone constructed during the time of the Byzantine emperor Justinian I. The access streets were lined with newly built shops and large buildings, serving both commercial and residential functions. This concern with urban development matched similar activities in other Decapolis towns, such as Gadara (Umm Qays) and Gerasa (Jerash/Jarash), and reflects the role of regional centres in serving local populations during late antiquity.

=== Early Islamic period ===
On the plain of the Jordan Valley below Pella, a historically decisive battle took place in January 635 CE (13 AH) between a Muslim army and the Byzantine forces stationed at Pella and Scythopolis (Beit She'an; Beisan). This encounter, one of the earliest between Muslims and Byzantines, came to be known as the Battle of Fihl (also Battle of Fahl, Fahl being a later variant of Fihl). As the Byzantine forces practically annihilated in this battle, the Muslims forces continued to the town of Pella, where they faced little resistance with the town of Pella surrendering by treaty, thereby avoiding occupation by military conquest. Accordingly, the archaeological record shows no disruption attributable to the arrival of Islam, as was the case for nearly all the towns of Bilad al-Sham. Rather, the churches, markets and houses of Pella continued in use, with the archaeology showing their progressive modification to meet evolving social and political conditions, as in many of the other towns of the Decapolis alliance in north Jordan. In particular, a large market and workshop area was installed adjacent to the Civic Complex church at the heart of the Byzantine town plan.

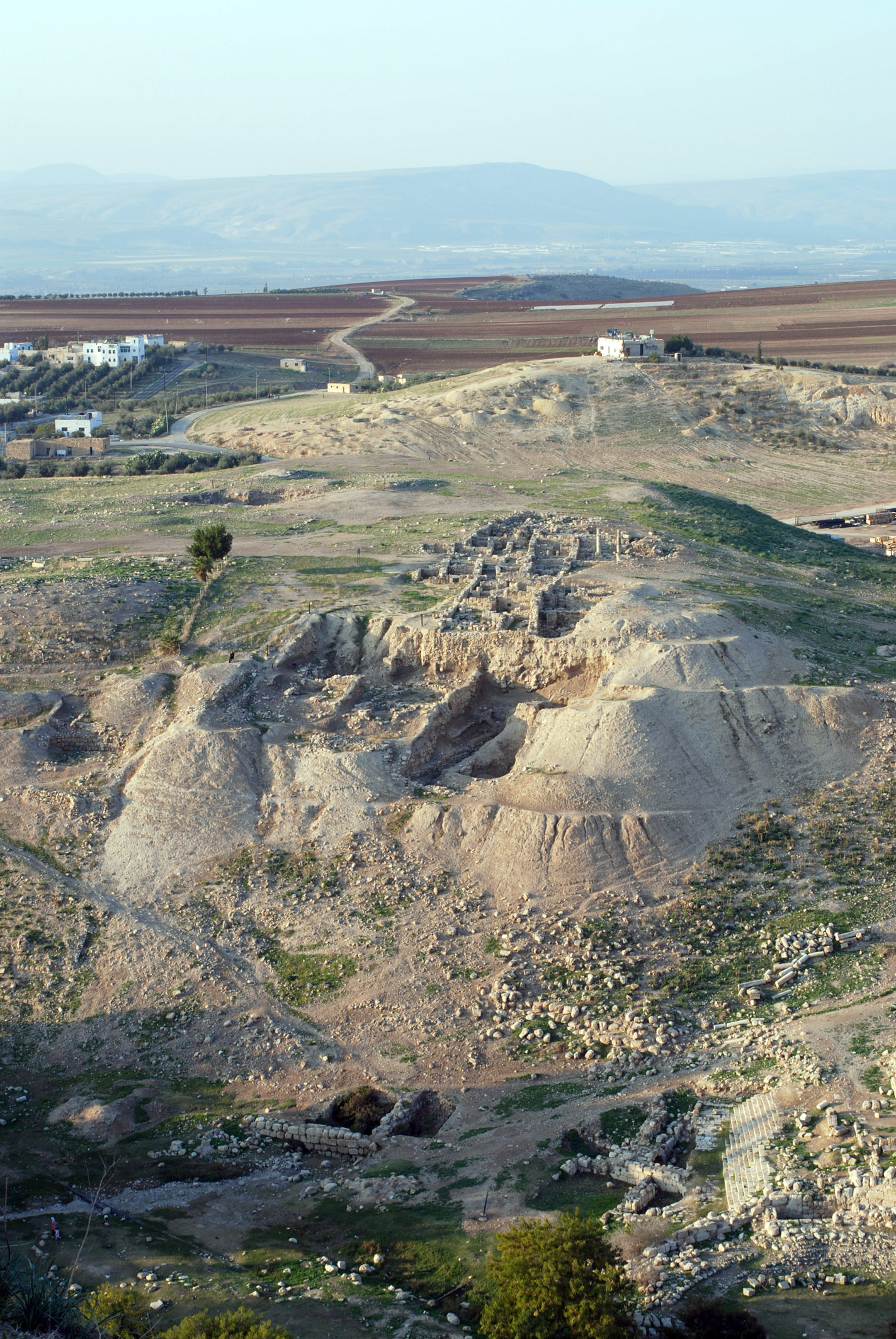
Eastern portion of main tell (mound)

Umayyad Pella, which by the eighth century CE had officially returned to its original Semitic name of Fihl (variant of Pihil), was totally devastated by the massive 749 Galilee earthquake, as a Jordan Valley rift fault line runs directly under the site. The stone and mudbrick two-storeyed houses on the top of the tell (main mound) collapsed in on themselves, thereby trapping the inhabitants – human and animal – and preserving a rich collection of finds sourced from distant regions, such as Egypt and the Arabian Peninsula.

Subsequent settlement at Pella, dated from the later eighth to eleventh centuries CE (from the Abbasid into the Fatimid period), was reduced in size, but featured an enclosed double-courtyard architectural complex in the valley immediately north of the tell. The configuration of the complex suggests markets (khans), with commercial activities such as glass workshops. An Abbasid khan (caravanserai) dating to ca. 950 CE was unearthed at Pella. Recent work on the tell has identified widespread rebuilding following the 749 earthquake, as indicated by wall foundations, plastered floors and refuse pits filled with finely worked bone and moulded glassware.

=== Later history ===
Evidence for a presence in the Crusader period (12th century CE) is slight – a few pottery shards only – but in the following Ayyubid and Mamluk periods the flat summit of the tell was inhabited by a large village, featuring a stone-built mosque with a minbar (pulpit), residential compounds defined by lane ways, and a large cemetery. Australian archaeologists discovered a Mameluke mosque and administrative compound (ca. 1350 CE). Late 16th century Ottoman defters list a village called Fahl el Tahta in the administrative district of Ajlun where wheat, barley, and sesame were grown and taxes collected on goats, beehives and water-driven mills.

=== Recent excavations ===
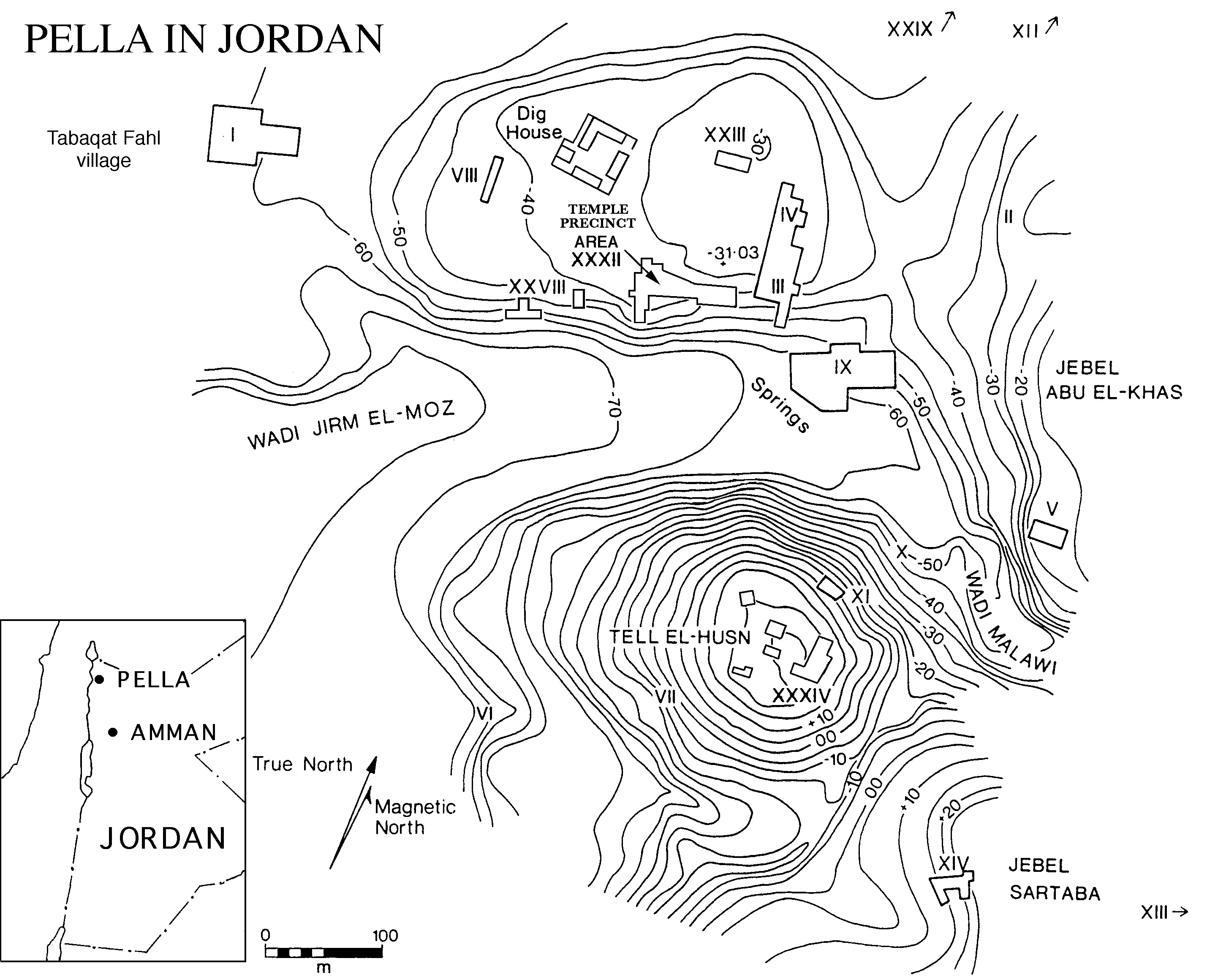
Topographical map Pella, including several significant excavation areas

The site was first published as part of a regional survey by G. Schumacher, but the first excavation was conducted by Funk and Richardson only in 1958, revealing Bronze and Iron Age material in two soundings. From 1966 to 1967, R. H. Smith led a team from Wooster College (Ohio) to prepare a plan of the site and its environs, and begin excavations, but was interrupted by the Six Day War. A joint project with the University of Sydney (Australia), but with separate excavation teams and seasons, explored the city from 1978 to 1985. The Australian expedition was initially directed by Prof. J. B. Hennessy and Dr A. W. McNicoll. Wooster College stopped their excavations in 1985, but the Australian project continues. Between 1994 and 1996, Pam Watson (at the time, Asst Director of the British Institute at 'Amman) and Dr Margaret O'Hea of the University of Adelaide conducted the Pella Hinterland Survey to identify land-use in an area approx. 30 square kilometers around the city.

Since the 1990s, with the project headed by Stephen Bourke, the focus has been on the site's Bronze and Iron Age temples and administrative buildings. A Canaanite temple was uncovered between 1994 and 2003. In 2010 Stephen Bourke announced the discovery of a city wall and other structures, some dating back to the mid-4th millennium BCE.

== See also ==
- Flight to Pella
- Diocese of Pella
- Bayt Nattif, another 'Pella' from the Roman province of Judaea
