= Biryawaza =

High Egyptian official

Biryawaza (fl. c. 1350 BC) may have been a ruler in the Beqaa and Damascus regions, known from the Amarna letters.

He is often mentioned in the Amarna letters, although his title is never given clearly. Some scholars describe him as the king of Damascus, and others cite him as a high Egyptian official.

== Reign ==
It is unclear if Biryawaza was a local ruler (Akkadian LU "Man") or a commander. The name Biryawaza is Indo-European in origin. Biryawaza may have been of an Indo-European maryannu caste similar to that which ruled Mitanni and later, the Hittites.

== Amarna Archive ==
In the Amarna letters, Biryawaza is mentioned by name 16 times. He author four letters (EA 194-197) and is mentioned in seven other letters (EA 052, 053, 129, 151, 189, 234, 250).

=== Letters written ===
In the Amarna Archive (c. 1350 BC), Biryawaza was the author of four Amarna letters (EA 194–197) to the Pharaoh.

==== Amarna Letter EA 194 ====
In EA 194 we learn that Biryawaza was the son of Suttarna, grandson of Haš-[x]-tar, which may indicate a Mitanni background and a line of succession. He controlled a caravan trade route from Egypt to Mesopotamia, in this case to the Land of Naharima, which went along the eastern Jordan valley by way of Pella and Damascus.

(o 001) To the king, my lord, a message from Biryawaza, your servant. I fall at the feet of the king, my lord, seven (times) and seven times.

(o 005) Look, we are servants, serving the king from time immemorial, like Šuttarna, my father, like Haš-[x]-tar, my grandfather. (o 011) Look, we are [... ... ... ... ... ... ...] son [...] regarding [...] in order to guard the cities. (As for) the caravan that you dispatched to the land of Naharima, let it come forth. [... ...] my [... ...] it (f.s.) is very fearful. (l.e. 030) Herewith I dispatch my brother t[o] you.

Edition by Jacob Lauinger and Tyler Yoder (CC-BY-SA 3.0). Note: "Land of Mitanni" changed to "Land of Naharima" (KUR na-aḫ-ri-mi) as the original text states.

==== Amarna Letter EA 195 ====
In EA 195, Biriawaza commands troops and chariots, refers to his brothers, and auxiliary forced by tribal Habiru/'Apiru (cf. Hebrews) and Sutean mercenaries from the Khabur and Euphrates regions in Mitanni. Unlike many of the other subjects in the southern Levant complaining about the presence of the Habiru-mercenaries, they were here employed in his service. These mercenaries provided military service in return for land.

(o 001) Speak to the king, my lord, a message from Biryawaza, your servant, the dust (Akk. gloss: the dust) of your feet and the ground upon which you tread, a chair upon which you sit, and a footstool (Akk. gloss: a footstool) for (lit. of) your feet. I fall at the feet of the king, my lord, the Sun god of the morning (Akk. gloss: mornings) {Can. of the peoples}, seven times plus seven times.

(r 016) My lord is the Sun god in the heavens (Akk. gloss: the heavens), and like the emergence of the Sun god from the heavens, in this way servants await the emergence of commands from the mouth (Akk. gloss: the mouth) of their lord. (r 024) Now, I, together with my troops and my chariots, and together with my brothers, and together with my habiru, and together with my Suteans, am (ready) for the front of the regular troops, wherever the king, my lord, commands (them to go).

Edition by Jacob Lauinger and Tyler Yoder (CC-BY-SA 3.0).

==== Amarna Letter EA 196 ====
In EA 196, there is an important reference to the King of the Land of Hittite, which provides a dating of this letter to the time when Suppiluliuma I had attacked Tushratta during six military campaigns (c. 1350-1345 BC) leading to the fall of Mitanni - an ally of Egypt. With the high chronology of the Egyptian New Kingdom, this would date the letter to the reign of Tutankhamen (r. 1356/1355-1346/1345 BC).

(o 001) Spea[k to the king], my [lord, a message from Bir]yawaza, [your] servant. I fall [a]t the feet of the king, <my> l[ord], seven (times) plus seven times.

(o 005) I have obeyed when the k[ing, my] lord, sent [...]-saya. I am on guard, and I [ser]ve the king, my lord, in this [pl]ace. Abundant [troops] of the king, my lord, should [quickly] reach [the king of the land of Ha]tt[i]. The guard of the king, [my lord, has gone away] from me. I am the [one servant] of the king who remains to [him]. The king, my lord, should know that [al]l of the servants of the king, my lord, left to follow [the king] of the land of Hatti, but all of the commissioners [of the king], my [lo]rd, who came forth [arri]ved. [...] (r 026) [...] my [...], my [... ...] my wives [and] my daughter-in-law, and he placed (them) in the lap (Akk. gloss: his lap).

(r 030) Something else: Now, [the king], my lord, has learned of this matter. Since time immemorial, a ruler has not done this de<ed>. (r 033) Something else: The king, [my] lord, should dispatch 200 men to me in order to guard [your servant and] in order to guard the cities of the king, [my] lord, [un]til I see the regular army of the king, my lord. The king, my lord, should not keep silent [rega]rding this deed that Biridašwa [has] done [becau]se the land of [the king], my lord, and [his] cities departed.

Edition by Jacob Lauinger and Tyler Yoder (CC-BY-SA 3.0).

==== Amarna Letter EA 197 ====
In EA 197, Biryawaza is in conflict with regional petty kings and his main rival Biridašwa. The reference to the King of the Land of Hatti dates this letter to the time when Suppiluliuma I attacked Tushratta (see above EA 196). The letter provides some geographical information, as Biryawaza has gone to the Land of Apu and the city of Damascus, with a conflict that spans from Qadesh in the north (formerly Mitanni, now Hatti), through the Beqaa Valley to the reign of Damascus and the town of ʿAštartu (Tell Ashtara, Astaroth).

(o 001') [ ... sa]id t[o ...] your servant in A-[...] “[You gave] his horses and his chariots to the habiru, and you did not [give them] to the king, my lord.” {Can. Who} am I but a servant? Everything that is mine is for the king. Biridašwa saw this deed and incited the town of Yanʾuam against me. He shut the city gate behind me and captured the chariots from the town of ʿAštartu. He gave them to the habiru and did not give them to the king, my lord. The king of Buṣruna and the king of Halunnu saw (this), and they waged war with Biridašwa against me. They said: "Come! Let us kill Biryawaza. We will not dispatch him to[the land of Ta]hšu."But I got away from their [control] and stayed in [the land of Apu and] Damascus. When [they saw] that I was serving [the king, my lord, they] were saying, "We are [servants of the king of the land of Ha]tti," but I was saying, "I am a servant of the king of the land of Egypt." And Arzawya went to Qid[šu]. He brought (along) ʿAḏi[ri]’s troops, and he seized Šaddu. He gave it over to the habiru; he did not give it to the king, my lord.

(r 031') Look, Etakkama caused the land of Qidšu to go out of (the king's) control, and this one, Arzawya, together with Biridašwa, is (now) causing the land of Apu to go out of (the king's) control. So the king should take care of his land lest hostile men capture it. Since my brothers are hostile to me, I am guarding Kumidu, the city of the king, my lord. The king should make peace for his servant; the king should not abandon his servant, [so that] the kings of [the land of Qidšu] and the land of Apu see i[f ... ... ... ...] (l.e. 001') [...] I have seen the regular troops.

Edition by Jacob Lauinger and Tyler Yoder (CC-BY-SA 3.0).

=== Letters mentioned ===
Biryawaza is mentioned in seven other letters (EA 052, 053, 129, 151, 189, 234, 250).

In a letter, King Burna-Buriash II of Babylonia said Biryazawa attacked a Babylonian caravan sending gifts to the Pharaoh.

In EA 151, ʾAbi-Milki of Tyre provides an overview of the affairs in his region mentioning the war against Birywaza.

In EA 250, Biryawaza was ordered by his Egyptian overlords to take armed action against Labaya's sons.
