= Bashan =

Historical region in the Levant mentioned in the Bible

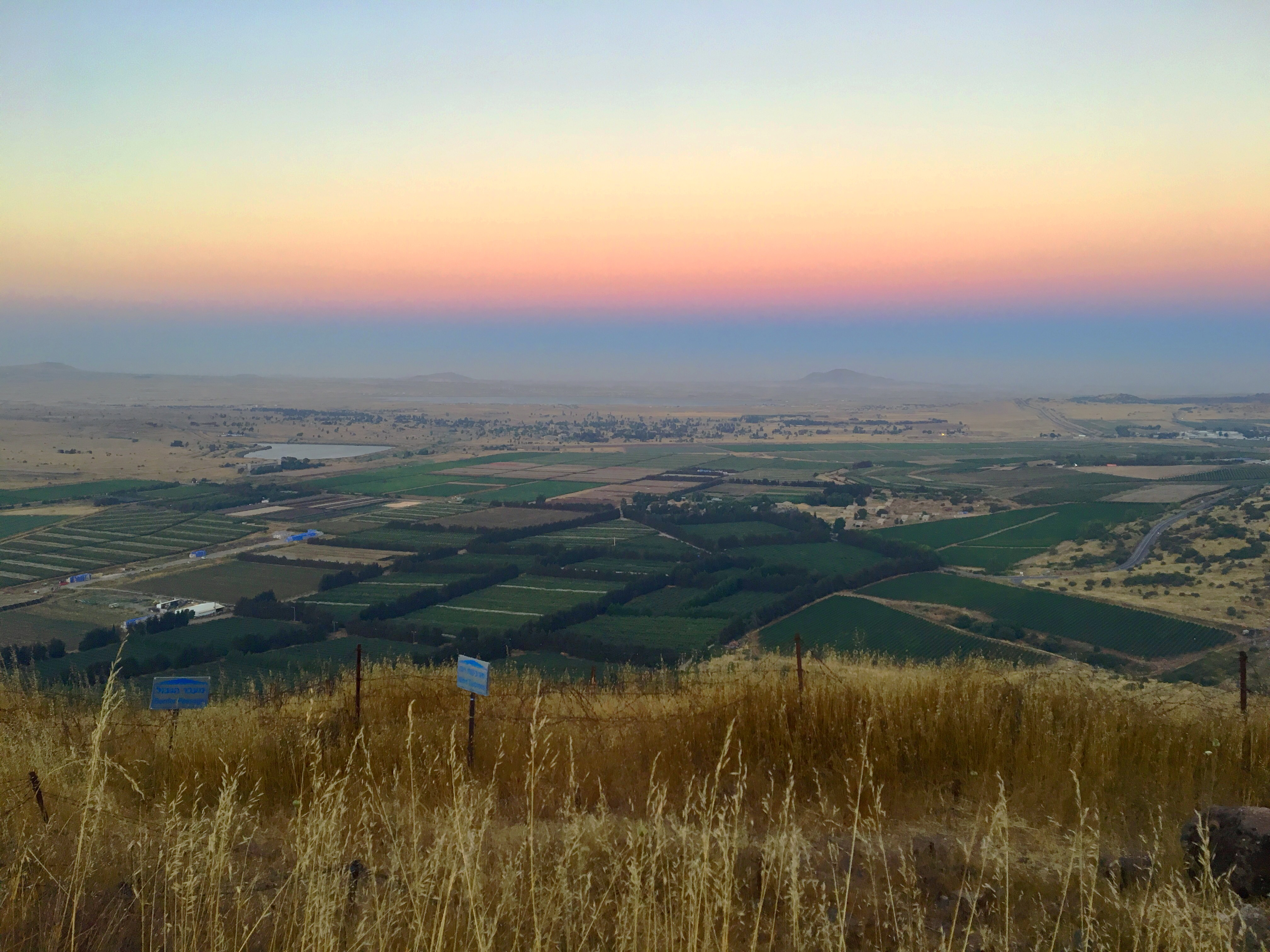
View from Mount Bental

Bashan (/ˈbeɪʃən/; Hebrew: הַבָּשָׁן, romanized: habBashan; Latin: Basan or Basanitis) is the ancient, biblical name used for the northernmost region of Transjordan during the Iron Age. It is situated in modern-day Jordan and Syria. Its western part, nowadays known as the Golan Heights, was occupied by Israel during the 1967 Six Day War, and remains under Israel's occupation.

Bashan has been inhabited since at least the fourth millennium BCE. Its earliest mention is found in a Sumerian text dating back to the third millennium BCE. During the Late Bronze Age, Bashan is recorded in Egyptian sources as being under the control of their empire. Biblical tradition holds that an Amorite kingdom in Bashan was conquered by the Israelites during the reign of King Og. Throughout the monarchic period, Bashan was contested between the kingdoms of Israel and Aram-Damascus. Tiglath-pileser III of Assyria eventually intervened, removing Bashan from Israel's control.

Bashan is mentioned 59 times in the Hebrew Bible. It is the location of Ashtaroth Karnaim and Edrei (modern-day Daraa), as well as the city of Golan, which gave its name to the modern Golan Heights. The name Bashan fell out of use in classical antiquity, in which the region was divided into four districts: Batanaea, Gaulanitis, Trachonitis and Auranitis.

== Etymology ==
In some Semitic languages, bashan (Ugaritic: bšn) meant serpent. These reflexes derive from a Proto-Semitic form *baṯan.

== History ==
=== Hebrew Bible ===
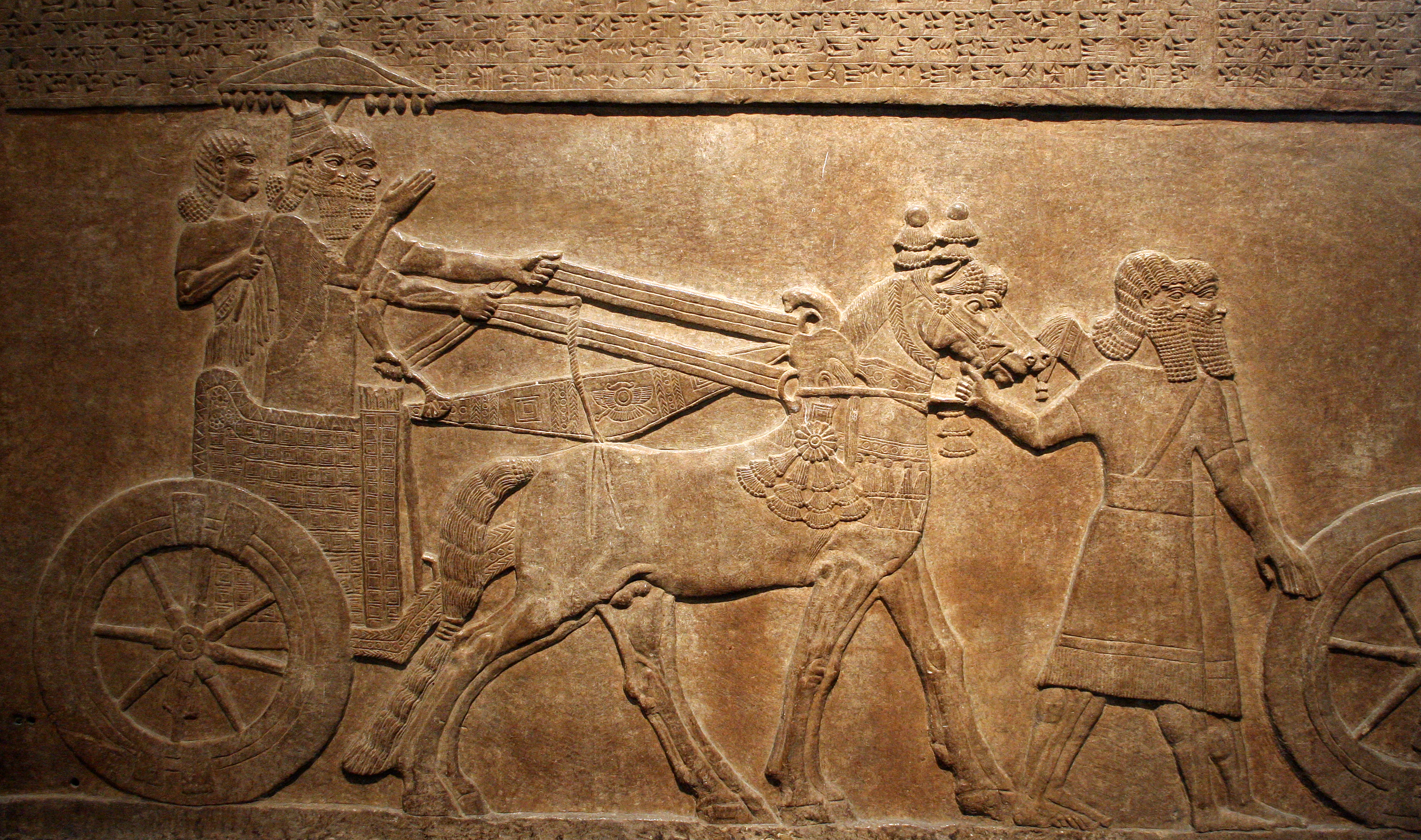
The capture of the city of "Astartu" (thought to be Ashteroth in the land of king Og of Bashan, east of the Jordan River), by the Assyrian king Tiglath-Pileser III about 730–727 BCE, as depicted on a palace relief now kept on display at the British Museum.

The Book of Numbers tells that King Og of Bashan came out against the Israelites led by Moses at the time of their entrance into the Promised Land, but was vanquished in battle (Numbers 21:33–35; Deuteronomy 3:1–7). Deuteronomy 3:1–7 states:

Then we turned, and went up the way to Bashan: and Og the king of Bashan came out against us, he and all his people, to battle at Edrei. And the LORD said unto me, Fear him not: for I will deliver him, and all his people, and his land, into thy hand; and thou shalt do unto him as thou didst unto Sihon king of the Amorites, which dwelt at Heshbon. So the LORD our God delivered into our hands Og also, the king of Bashan, and all his people: and we smote him until none was left to him remaining. And we took all his cities at that time, there was not a city which we took not from them, threescore cities, all the region of Argob, the kingdom of Og in Bashan. All these cities were fenced with high walls, gates, and bars; beside unwalled towns a great many. And we utterly destroyed them, as we did unto Sihon king of Heshbon, utterly destroying the men, women, and children, of every city. But all the cattle, and the spoil of the cities, we took for a prey to ourselves.

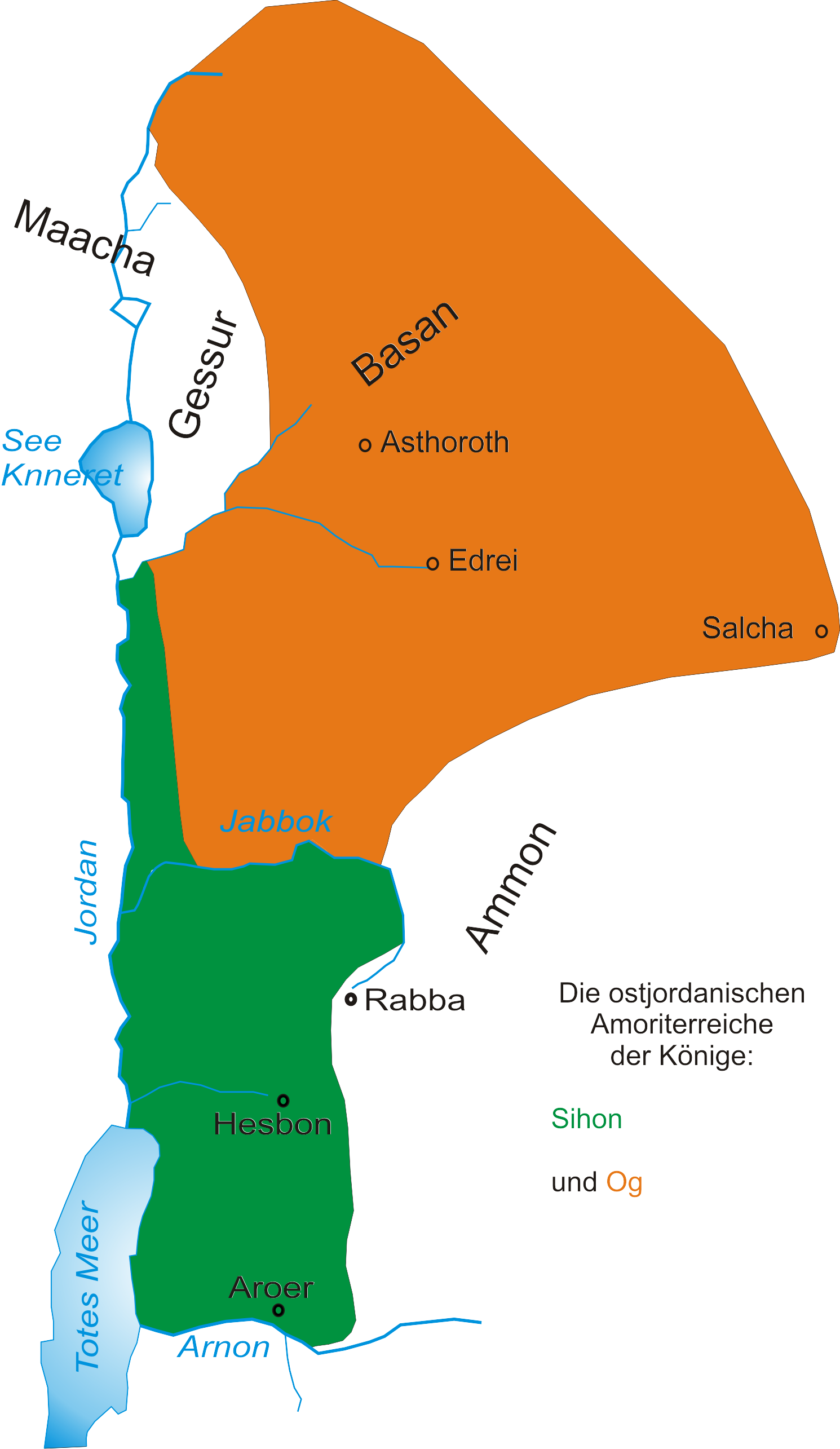

Along with the half of Gilead, it was given to the half-tribe of Manasseh (Joshua 13:29–31). According to the Book of Joshua, Golan, one of its cities, became a Levitical city and a city of refuge (Joshua 21:27). Argob, in Bashan, was one of Solomon's commissariat districts (1 Kings 4:13).

In the late-9th century BCE, the cities of Bashan were taken by Hazael, monarch of the Syrian kingdom of Aram-Damascus (2 Kings 10:33), but were soon after reconquered by Jehoash (2 Kings 13:25) who overcame the Syrians in three battles, according to the prophecy of Elisha (2 Kings 13:19).

From this time, Bashan almost disappears from history, although there are biblical references to the wild cattle of its rich pastures (see Ezekiel 39:18, Psalm 22:12 and Amos 4:1), the oaks of its forests (Isaiah 2:13; Ezekiel 27:6; Zechariah 11:2), the beauty of its extensive plains (also in Amos 4:1), Jeremiah 50:19), and the rugged majesty of its mountains (Psalm 68:15). Bashan is also mentioned in 1 Chronicles 5:16: "[The Gadites] lived in Gilead, in Bashan and its outlying villages, and on all the pasturelands of Sharon as far as they extended."

=== Later periods ===
The Bashan was ultimately conquered and pillaged by the Neo-Assyrian Empire, which held onto it from 732 to 610 BCE. It later saw security and prosperity under the Achaemenid Empire; its settlements became better developed and culturally Aramaized.
