= Salhi =

Salhi or al-Salhi with the Arabic definite article "al" may refer to:

== People ==
- Abdelkader Salhi (footballer) (born 1993), Algerian footballer
- Abdelkader Salhi (serial killer), known as The 10 Killer, a suspected German serial killer
- Bassam as-Salhi, Palestinian politician
- Hafid Salhi (born 1993), Dutch footballer
- Mohammed Al-Salhi, Saudi athlete
- Nabil Salhi (born 1971), Tunisian wrestler
- Radhouane Salhi, Tunisian footballer
- Toafik Salhi, Tunisian footballer
- Yassin Salhi, French domestic terrorist in the Saint-Quentin-Fallavier attack
- Yassine Salhi (footballer, born 1987), Moroccan football forward
- Yassine Salhi (footballer, born 1989), Tunisian football midfielder
- Yassine Salhi (footballer, born 1992), Algerian football defender playing for CS Constantine

== Other uses ==
- Salhi (region), a region/city-state in the vicinity of Ugarit
- Salhi (music), a Tunisian genre of music
