= Hannathon =

Hannathon (Amarna Letter: Hinnatuna; Tel Hanaton; Tell el-Badawiya) was a city-state in Canaan during the Late Bronze Age. The site is strategically located on the trade route between the Hauran and the Akko Plain.

== History ==
=== Late Bronze Age ===
In the Late Bronze, Hinnatuna was a city-state in Canaan. It was located near Akko and Megiddo. It is attested in the Amarna Archive around 1350 BC as "Hinnatuna". It associated with the Biblical city/city-state of Hannathon, (meaning: "the Gift of Grace"). While the city has not been identified with certainty, the ancient settlement of Tel Hanaton in Lower Galilee has been suggested as a candidate.

==== Amarna Archive ====
In Egypt, the Amarna Archive mentions "Hinnatuna" first in Amarna Letters EA 245 and later in Amarna Letter EA 8. We learn that Surata of Akka was the father of Satatna of Akka, thus the events in EA 245 comes prior to the events in EA 8.

Amarna letter EA 245, to pharaoh, letter no. 4 of 7 by Biridiya, concerns the rebel, and mayor of Shechem-(Amarna Šakmu), Labayu, and his cohort and protector: Surata of Akka-(modern Acre, Israel). EA 245 is the second tablet of a 2–Tablet letter-(Part 1 lost).
Letter Part 2 of 2:

^{(1-7)} Moreover, I urged my brothers, "If the god of the king, our lord, brings it about that we overcome Lab'ayu, then we must bring him alive: ha-ia-ma to the king, our lord.

^{(8-12)} My mare, however, having been put out of action: tu-ra (having been shot), I took my place behind him: ah-ru-un-ú and rode with Yašdata.
^{(13-20)} But before my arrival they had struck him down: ma-ah-sú-ú,-(mahāsū). Yašdata being truly your servant, he it was that entered with me into batt[le] .
^{(21-47)}(bottom/tablet and reverse)May ... [...] the life of the king, my [lord], that he may br[ing peace to ever]yone in [the lands of] the king, [my] lord. It had been Surata that took Lab'ayu from Magidda and said to me, "I will send him to the king by boat: a-na-yi." Surata took him, but he sent him from Hinnatunu to his home, for it was Surata that had accepted from him: ba-di-ú his ransom.
^{(?41-47)} Moreover, what have I done to the king, my lord, that he has treated me with contempt: ia_{8}-qí-ìl-li-ni and honored: ia_{8}-ka-bi-id my less important brothers? It was Surata that let Lab'ayu go, and it was Surata that let Ba'l-mehir go, (both) to their homes. And may the king, my lord, know."

-EA 245, lines 1-47 (complete, (minor 1-sentence lacuna))(Letter Part 2 of 2; Letter Part 1–lost)

Amarna letter EA 8 is a letter to Pharaoh by Burna-Buriash of Karaduniyaš-(i.e. Babylon). The letter, entitled: "Merchants murdered, vengeance demanded", states near the letter beginning: "...Now, my merchants who were on their way with Ahu-tabu, were detained in Canaan for business matters. After Ahu-tabu went on to my brother-(the pharaoh), –in Hinnatuna of Canaan, Šum-Adda, the son of Balumme, and Šutatna, the son of Šaratum of Akka-(modern Acre), having sent their men, killed my merchants and took away [th]eir money."

Burna-Buriash continues, and states that he demands retribution, as well as he makes a warning to the pharaoh, that his own merchants/envoys are in danger.

=== Iron Age ===
==== Iron Age II ====
In the late 8th century BCE, the region was attacked and subjugated by the Neo-Assyrian Empire. Tiglath-Pileser III mentions Hannathon in his royal annals (Ann. 18, Line 15) as part of the northern cities of the Kingdom of Israel conquered in 734-732 BCE, and the deportation of the local population (elite).

== See also ==
- Biridiya of Megiddo
- Yašdata
- Labaya
- Surata (Akka mayor), Akka/Acre, Israel
- Amarna letters
- Tel Hanaton
- Hanaton

=== Amarna letters (photos) ===
King of Babylon:
- EA 9-(Obverse); see: Karaduniyaš

Tushratta:

- EA 19-(Obverse), Article, Tushratta
- EA 23-(Reverse), with Black Hieratic; Article-(British Museum); see: Shaushka
- EA 28-(Obverse), see: Pirissi and Tulubri

"Alashiya kingdom" letters:

- EA 34-(Obverse); see: EA 34

Rib-Hadda letters:

- EA 126-(Obverse); Article-(Click for larger Picture); See: Salhi (region)

Abimilku:

- #1: EA 153-(Obverse); Article
- #2: EA 153-(Obverse)-2nd; see: Abimilku

Abdi-Tirši:

- EA 228-(Obverse)//(228,330,299,245,252), (EA 330, for Šipti-Ba'lu); Article, Pic writeup

Biridiya:

- EA 245-(Obverse) EA 245-(Reverse); Article-1; Article-2; Hannathon/Hinnatuna

Labaya:

- EA 252-(Obverse), Article, see Labaya

Others:

- EA 299-(High Res.)(Obverse); see Yapahu
- EA 369-Front/Back-(Click on each); see: Milkilu
