= Hanaton =

Kibbutz in northern Israel

Hanaton: חנתון (Hebrew)
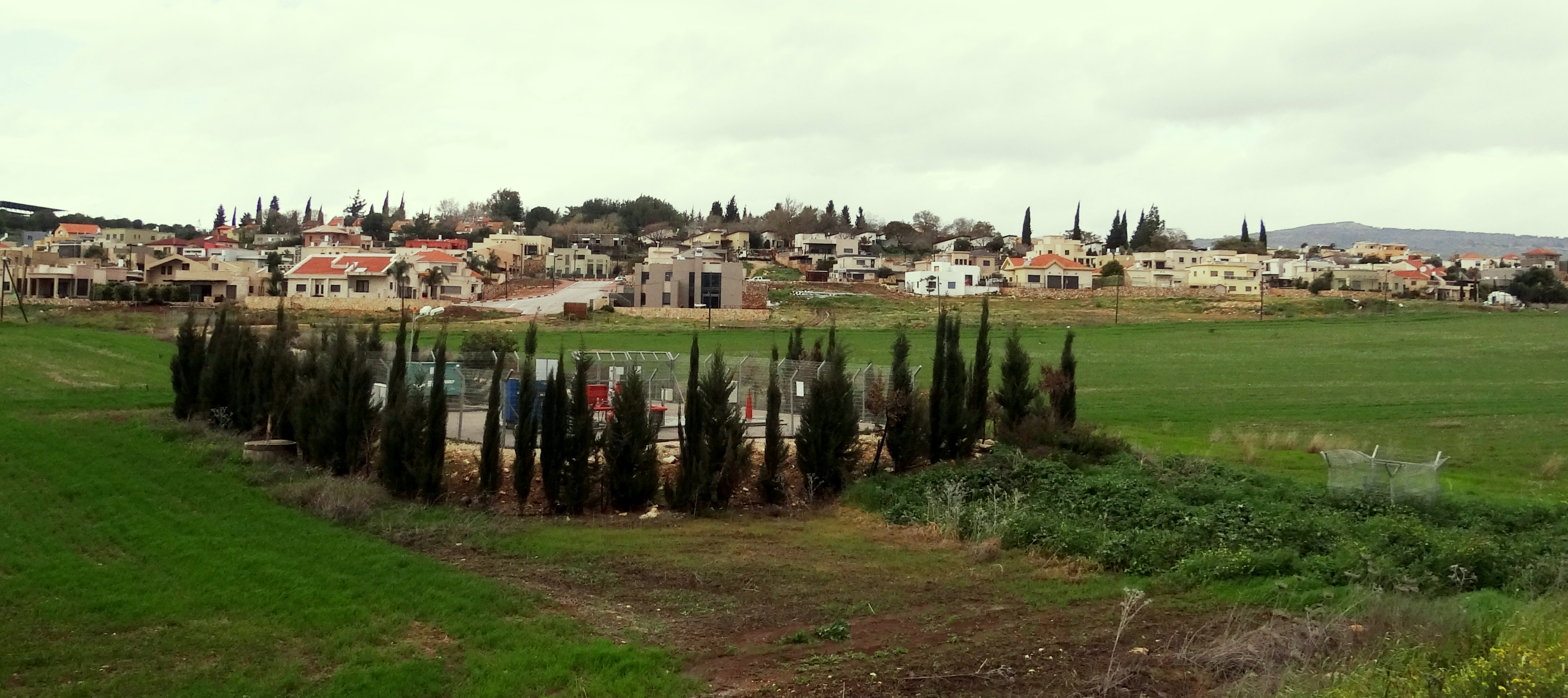

- Location within Jezreel Valley region of Israel Location within Israel
- Coordinates: 32°47′9″N 35°14′38″E
- Country: Israel
- District: Northern
- Subdistrict: Jezreel
- Council: Jezreel Valley
- Affiliation: Kibbutz Movement
- Founded: 1984
- Founder: American Conservative Jews
- Population (2024): 1,008
- Website: hanaton.net

Hanaton (Hebrew: חנתון) is a kibbutz in northern Israel. Located twelve kilometers north of Nazareth near the Arab town of Shefaram, it falls under the jurisdiction of Jezreel Valley Regional Council. In 2024 it had a population of 1,008.

== Etymology ==
The biblical name Hanaton (Hebrew: חנתן), also spelled Hannathon, appears in the Book of Joshua (Joshua 19:14, 16), where it is listed as inside the allotment of the tribe of Zebulun, on the border with the tribe of Asher.

== Archaeology ==
Tel Hanaton, an archaeological site associated with the biblical city of Hannathon, lies to the east of the kibbutz. The tell is in the western end of the Beit Netofa Valley, and covers an area of roughly 100 dunams (25 acres). It was occupied from the Bronze Age through the Ottoman period.

In the 14th-century BCE Amarna letters, the settlement of Ḫinnatuna is mentioned as a location where caravans passed on their route from Babylon to Egypt. Tiglath-Pileser III also lists Ḥanathon among the cities he conquered in the Galilee. Researchers suggest identifying these locations with Tel Hanaton.

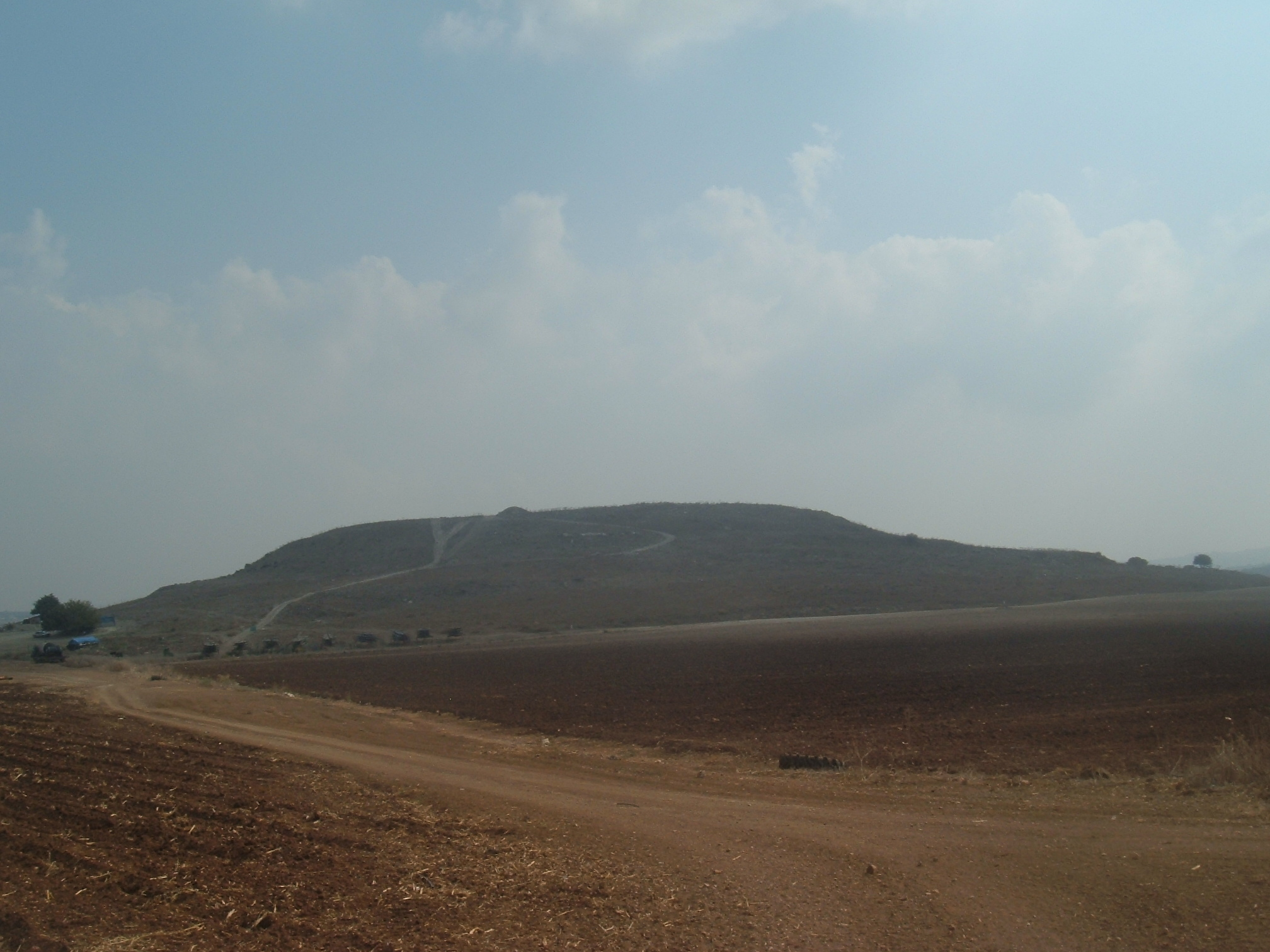
General view of Tel Hanaton

== Geography ==
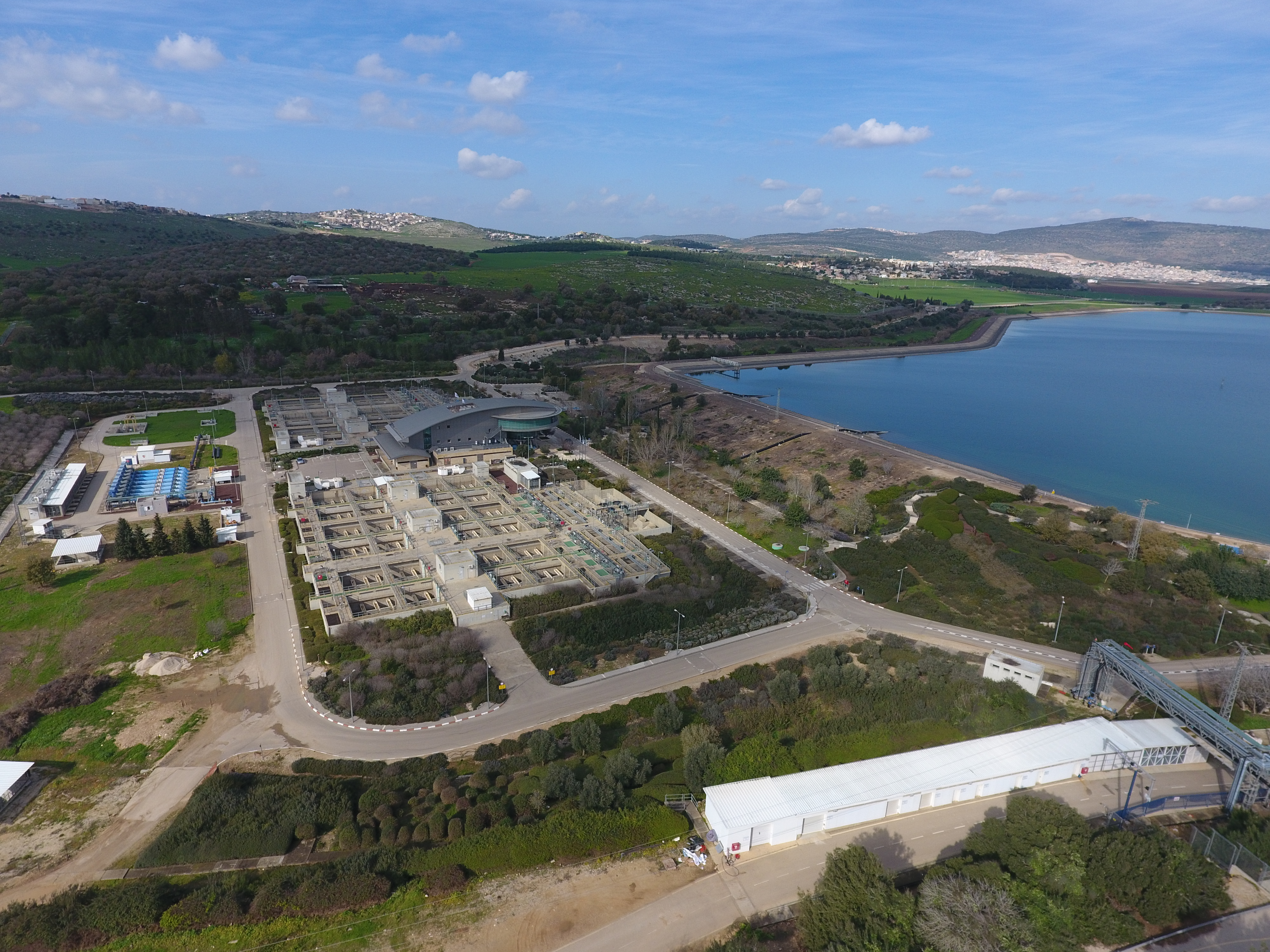
Eshkol reservoir

Kibbutz Hanaton overlooks the Eshkol reservoir, an important component of the National Water Carrier. The 4.5 million m^{3} reservoir is fed by water carried by the Beit Netofa Canal. To the north of the kibbutz is the Arab village of Kafr Manda. Southwest of the kibbutz, across highway 79, lies Alon HaGalil.

== History ==
In the 1980s, inspired by the Reform movement's first kibbutz, Yahel, a group of students affiliated with the Jewish Theological Seminary in New York City decided to establish a kibbutz for adherents of Conservative Judaism. Gar'in Nitzan recruited members from across the United States and joined forces with the Israeli branch, the Masorti Movement. In Israel, they hired Rabbi Ehud Bandel to organize high school seniors interested in joining a Nahal gar'in. On 1 September 1983, Gar'in Noam (30 members, aged 18–19) moved to Kfar HaHoresh for training. They were joined by Gar'in Nitzan (40 members, aged 19–35, including several families with small children). In September 1984, the founders moved into the new kibbutz, which was named for a biblical town that existed in the area and is mentioned in the Book of Joshua. The founders were later joined by immigrants from South Africa, South America, the Netherlands, and Canada. In 1997 the United Kibbutz Movement began to send HaNoar HaOved VeHaLomed groups to the kibbutz, but they have not been accepted as full-fledged members for ideological reasons.

In 2006, in the wake of financial difficulties, attorney Sagi Mirom was appointed as a dissolution trustee. Under his stewardship the annual deficit of 80,000 NIS (about $22,000 US at the time) was reversed, and the kibbutz recovered economically.

In 2008, it was decided to recharter Hanaton as a "renewed kibbutz" (Hebrew: קיבוץ מתחדש). Since March 2011, the kibbutz has been accepting new members and new housing units are under construction.

In 2023, former long-time resident Eitan Chikli said that the Kibbutz now has "more Reform members than Conservative ones." But that the majority of members are secular.

== Economy ==
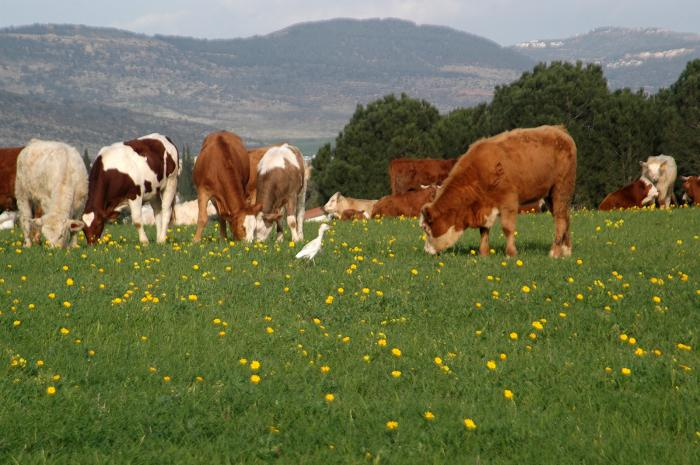
Kibbutz Hanaton dairy herd

In its early years, the kibbutz engaged in agriculture. A small crafts business, Hadran, manufactures rug kits. The kibbutz operates a dairy in partnership with Kibbutz Gat and a state-of-the-art chicken coop where chicken and turkey hatchlings are raised in a controlled, computerized environment. It grows greenhouse tomatoes, table grapes and grapefruits. A primary source of income is the Education & Lodging Center that provides lodging and workshops for Conservative Jewish youth groups from North America.

== Notable residents ==
- Amichai Chikli, politician, government minister, grew up on the kibbutz and lives there
- Haviva Ner-David, feminist activist and Open Orthodox rabbi
