= Salhi (region) =

Location near Ugarit c. 1350–1335 BC

The Salhi is a region/city-state in the vicinity of Ugarit during the 15-20 year Amarna letters correspondence of 1350–1335 BC.

The region of Salhi is referenced in only one letter of the Amarna letters corpus, that of EA 126, (EA for 'el Amarna'), and EA 126 is in the sub-corpus of the 68-letters written from Rib-Hadda of Gubla/-(Byblos). As stated in the letter: .."boxwood, it is taken from the land of Salhi and from Ugarit." Rib-Haddi's letter no. 126 is written to the Egyptian pharaoh.

== The letter of: "lands of Salhi" and of Ugarit ==
=== Letter EA 126, title: "Rejection of Gubla or Rib-Hadda?" ===
Letter no. 55 of 68 by Rib-Haddi of Gubla-(Byblos):

"(1-13)–Rib-Eddi. Say to the king-(i.e. Pharaoh), my lord: I fall beneath the feet of my lord 7 times and 7 times. As for my lord's having written for bo [xwood] , it is taken from the lands of Salhi and from Ugarit. I am unable to send my ships there, since Aziru is at war with me, and all the mayors are at peace with him. Their ships go about as they please, and they get what they need.
(14-26)–Moreover-(i-nu-ma), why does the king give the mayors, my friends, every sort of provision, but to me not give anything?
(17-26)–Previously-(a-du), money and everything for the(ir) provisions were sent from the palace to my ancestors, and my lord would send troops to them. But now I write for troops, but a garrison is not sent, and nothing at all is given [to m]e.
(27-60)–A[s for] the king, my lord's, [having said],—"Gua[rd yourself] and [the city of the king where you are]," how am I to guar[d myself]? I wrote t[o the king, my lord], "They have taken a[ll] m[y cities]; the son of 'Abdi-Aširta-(i.e. Aziru) is their [master]. Gub[la is the only c]ity I have." I have ind[eed sen]t my mes(sen)ger t[o the king], my [lo]rd, but troops are not sen[t], and [my] messenger you do not allow to come out. So send him along with rescue forces. If the king hates his city, then let him abandon it; but if me, then let him dismiss me. Send a man of yours to g[uar]d it. Why is nothing given to me from the palace? ... the Hittite troops–and they have set fire to the country. I have written repeatedlly, but no word comes back to me. They have seized all the lands of the king, my lord, but my lord has done nothing to them. Now they are mobilizing the troops of the Hittite countries to seize Gubla.
(61-66)–So give thought to [your] city. And may the [k]ing pay no atten[tion] to the men of the army. They give all the silver and gold of the king to the sons of 'Abdi-Aširta, and the sons of 'Abdi-Aširta give this to the strong king, and accordingly they are strong." -EA 126, lines 1-66-(lines 1-30 on obverse) (complete-(with minor lacuna))

== See also ==
- Ugarit
- Rib-Hadda
- Amarna letters

=== Amarna letters (photos) ===
King of Babylon:

- EA 9-(Obverse); see: Karaduniyaš

Tushratta:

- EA 19-(Obverse), Article, Tushratta
- EA 23-(Reverse), with Black Hieratic; Article-(British Museum); see: Shaushka
- EA 28-(Obverse), see: Pirissi and Tulubri

"Alashiya kingdom" letters:

- EA 34-(Obverse); see: EA 34

Rib-Hadda letters:

- EA 126-(Obverse); Article-(Click for larger Picture); See: Salhi (region)

Abi-Milku:

- #1: EA 153-(Obverse); Article
- #2: EA 153-(Obverse)-2nd; see: Abi-Milku

Abdi-Tirši:

- EA 228-(Obverse)//(228,330,299,245,252) Archived 2013-03-04 at the Wayback Machine, (EA 330, for Šipti-Ba'lu); Article Archived 2013-03-04 at the Wayback Machine, Pic writeup Archived 2007-09-27 at the Wayback Machine

Biridiya:

- EA 245-(Obverse) EA 245-(Reverse); Article-1; Article-2; Hannathon/Hinnatuna

Labaya:

- EA 252-(Obverse), Article, see Labaya

Others:

- EA 299-(High Res.)(Obverse); see Yapahu
- EA 369-Front/Back-(Click on each); see: Milkilu
