= Tel Hanaton =

Archaeological site in Israel

- תל חנתון (Hebrew)
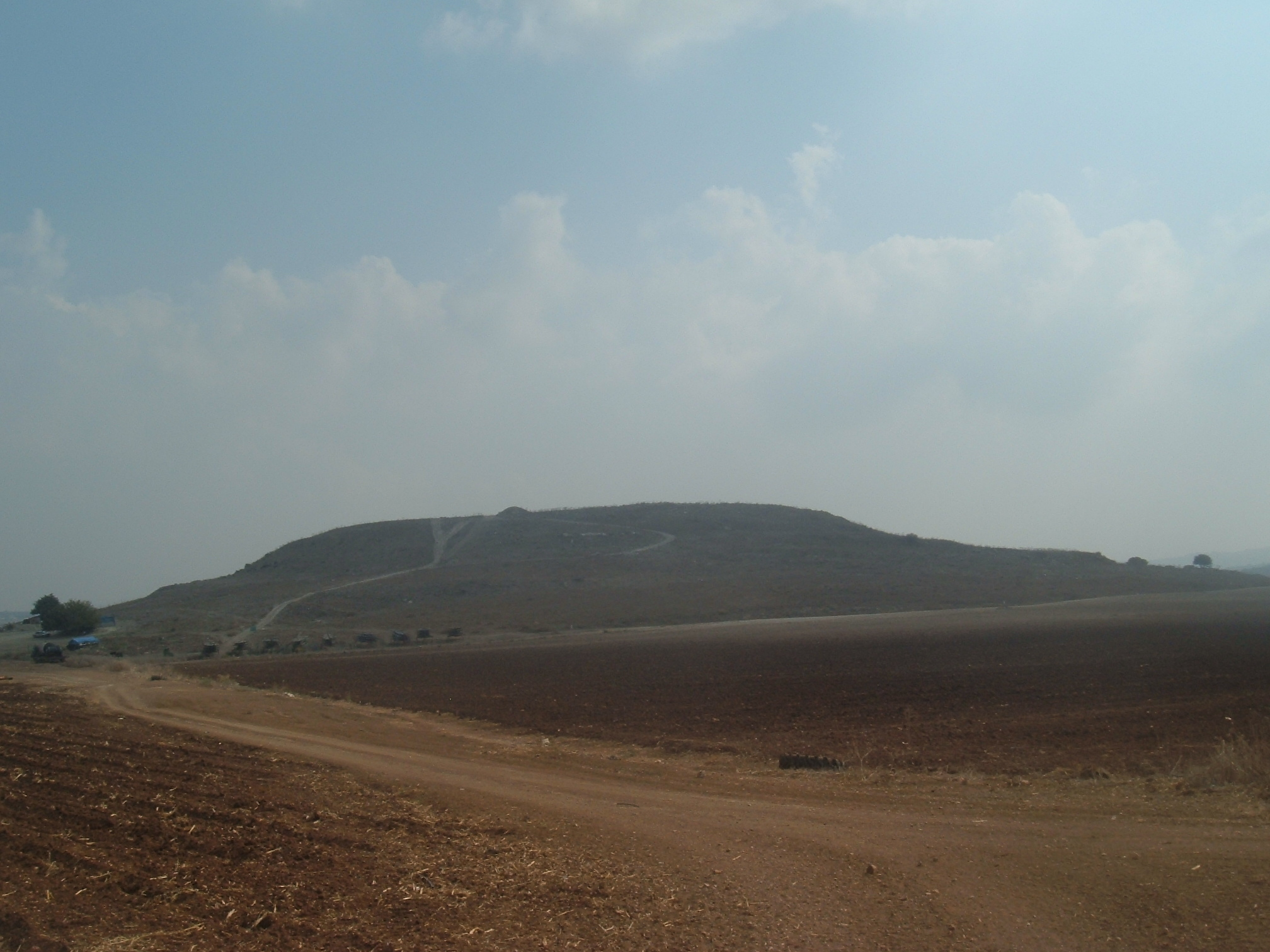
- Tel Hanaton

- Location within Israel
- 32°47′08″N 35°15′25″E
- Type: Tell
- Periods: Bronze Age, Iron Age, Crusader period, Ottoman period
- Cultures: Canaanite, Israelite, Crusader, Arab
- Location: Hanaton, Israel
- Region: Galilee

Tel Hanaton (Hebrew: תל חנתון; Arabic: تل بدويه, romanized: Tal Badawiye, lit. 'the nomads' tell') is an archaeological tell situated at the western edge of the Beit Netofa Valley, in the western Lower Galilee region of Israel, 2 kilometres (1.2 mi) south of the Town of Kfar Manda and 1 kilometre (0.62 mi) northeast of the kibbutz which took its name, Hanaton.

== Etymology ==
During most of the Late Bronze Age, the region of Canaan was under the control of Egypt, either as provinces and city-states ruled by Egyptian Governors; or by vassal Canaanite kings who paid annual homage (tribute) to the ruling Pharaoh. It is possible that the city was named for Pharaoh Amenhotep IV also known by the name Akhenaten, the founder of a brief period of monotheism (Atenism) from the Eighteenth dynasty of Egypt during 1352-1334 BC. The name Hanaton (pronounced Khanaton) and the name Akhenaten have identical consonants, which in the Semitic languages of the period are more significant than vowels, which may vary.

Tel Hanaton is associated with the biblical Hanaton (KJV spelling: Hannathon), mentioned in The Book of Joshua in the lands apportioned to the tribe of Zebulon (Zevulun).

== Description ==
The tell rises to 75 metres (246 ft) above the surrounding valley, part of which represents the stratification layers on which the Bronze Age and later settlements were built on a natural rock outcrop.

The site has easy access to water sources; nearby forested areas for wood; limestone hills to quarry for building materials and tools; fertile surrounding arable land for crops and livestock; the presence of clay for pottery in the muddy earth surrounding the tel caused by seasonal flooding; the natural rock outcrop raised above its surroundings for easy fortification. It was also located on the international trade route of the Bronze Age - a branch of the Via Maris.

== History ==
=== Middle Bronze Age ===
Archaeologists believe the main settlement phase dates to the Middle Bronze Age.

=== Late Bronze Age ===
The area of the Bronze Age city reached 100 dunams (approx. 25 acres), which attests to the power and wealth of the settlement, most likely achieved due to the large tracts of highly fertile arable land surrounding the tell in the Beit Netofa Valley, together with its position astride a major 'Egypt-to-Mesopotamia' international trade route for the period, named Via Maris by modern historians.

==== Egyptian period in Canaan ====
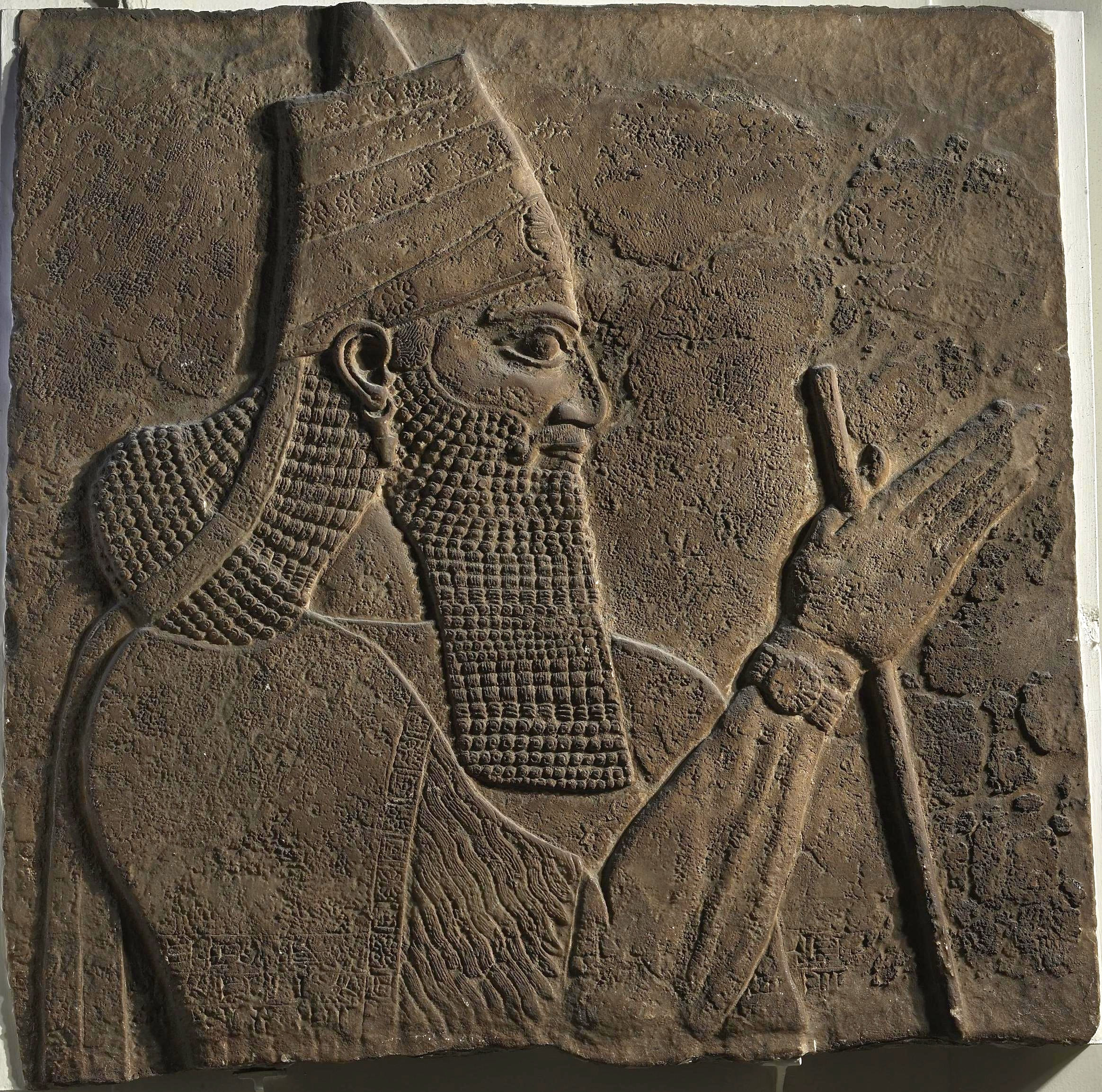
Tiglath-Pileser III—stela from the walls of his palace (British Museum, London)

The city is mentioned as 'Hinnatuna' in the 14th-century BC Amarna Letters of Ancient Egypt, showing its importance on a major trade route.

Hinnatuna is referenced in 2 Amarna letters, EA 8, and EA 245 ('EA' stands for 'El Amarna').

In Amarna letter EA 8, king Burna-Buriash of Babylon complains to the Pharaoh about some Babylonian merchants being killed somewhere near the city of 'Hinnatuna of Canaan', and asks him to take measures.

Amarna letter EA 245 is a letter to Pharaoh from Biridiya, a local ruler. It concerns a certain Labayu, who was probably the mayor of Shechem (Šakmu). This Labayu was then in trouble with the Pharaoh, but somehow escaped punishment after being held for a while in Hinnatuna.

=== Iron Age ===
The Transitional LB IIB/Iron IA was marked by a destruction layer found on the eastern slope.

==== Kingdom of Israel ====
The Iron Age IIA (10th century BCE), Hanaton was part of the Kingdom of Israel (Samaria).

==== Assyrian period ====
Hanaton is mentioned in records at Nineveh, the capital of the Neo-Assyrian Empire as one of five Israelite cities totally destroyed by Tiglath-pileser III, King of Assyria (r. 745–727 BC), in the campaign of conquest of the northern Kingdom of Israel between 734-732 BC. In 734 BCE, he campaigned along the Philistine coast to cut off Egyptian support. Between 733–732 BCE he turned inland, capturing Galilee, Gilead, and the Sharon plain. These regions were annexed roughly two-thirds of Israel’s territory, converting them into Assyrian provinces (Magidu, Du'ru, and Gal'azu). Pekah was assassinated and replaced by Hoshea, who ruled a significantly diminished state as an Assyrian vassal.

=== Classical Age ===
Restricted in this manner from expansion, the city, whilst never abandoned through to the Roman period, and unable to expand to the size of Hellenistic period cities, continually declined and was replaced as a major trading and urban centre by nearby Sepphoris, which was established on the ridge a few kilometres to the south east.

=== Early Muslim and Crusader periods ===
During the Early Muslim period, the site became a small agricultural village named Hotsfit, a name which survived into the Crusader period.

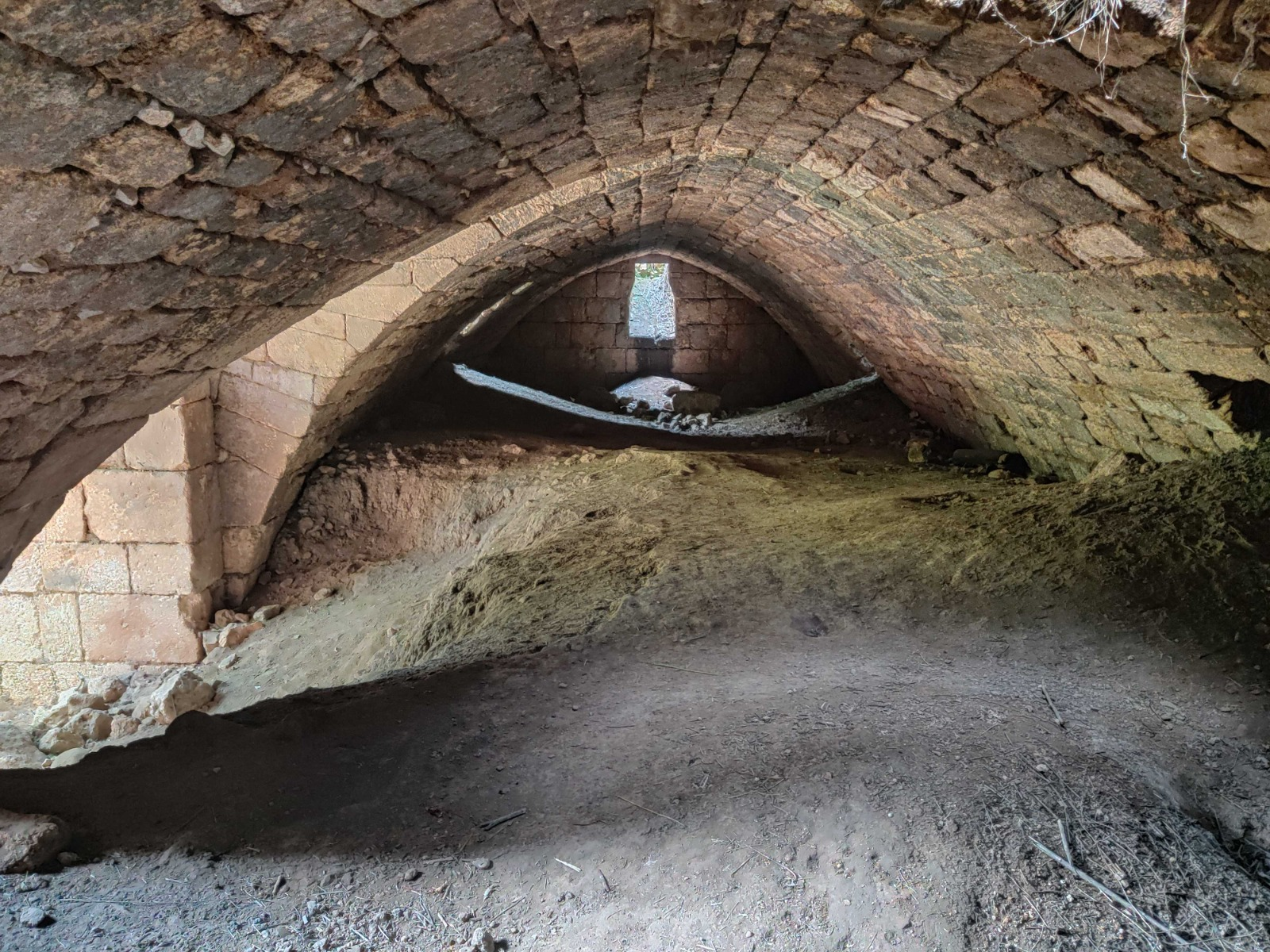
The basement of the crusader period tower at Tel Hanaton

The site shows physical evidence of typical Frankish construction with stone stairwells, large halls and arched ceilings, which may have been part of an 11th-century fortified agricultural settlement together with nearby Sepphoris (also known as Diocesarea). The architecture, whilst having much in common with concurrent strongholds of the Ayyubids, has distinct Crusader features, such as the arch-free flat-roofed stairwells.

There is a crusader-period tower at Tel Hanaton, measuring 28.0 by 18.9 metres (92 by 62 ft). Only the basement level survives.

=== Mamluk period ===
In the 1330s, the region was conquered by the Mamluks of Egypt, who used the Crusader fort to house their garrison.

=== Ottoman period ===
The Arabic name for the tell, Tal Badawiye, relates to the Ottoman period when a caravanserai named Khan El Badawiye was established atop the mound.

Historical geographer, Victor Guérin, thought that the tell may have been the village Garis mentioned by Josephus in The Jewish War, because of its proximity to Sepphoris.

== See also ==
- Hannathon
- Archaeology of Israel
