= Hafid =

Hafid may refer to:

- given name
  - Hafid Salhi, a Dutch footballer
- The Sea (2002 film) - a 2002 Icelandic film
- Hafid, Yemen
