= Amichai Chikli =

Israeli politician (born 1981)

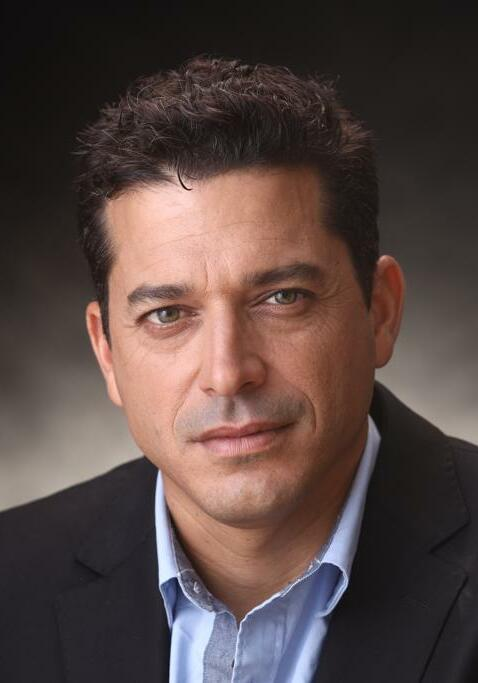
- Chikli in 2022

Ministerial roles
- 2022–2024: Minister for Social Equality
- 2022–: Minister of Diaspora Affairs

Faction represented in the Knesset
- 2021–2022: Yamina
- 2022: Independent
- 2022–2023: Likud

Personal details
- Born: 12 September 1981 (age 45) Jerusalem

Amichai Chikli (Hebrew: עמיחי שיקלי; born 12 September 1981) is an Israeli Likud politician serving as the Minister of Diaspora Affairs. He initially entered the 24th Knesset in 2021 as a member of Naftali Bennett's Yamina party, but defected by voting against his own coalition's formation and helping collapse the Bennett–Lapid government. He subsequently left Yamina to join Likud, winning election to the 25th Knesset on its party list.

== Biography ==
Chikli was born in Jerusalem in 1981 to Rabbi Eitan Chikli and artist Camille Chikli, who had emigrated from France. The family lived in Kibbutz Hanaton, the only kibbutz founded by the Masorti movement. The family attended synagogue services from different streams of Judaism.

After completing high school he spent a year in Ma'ayan Baruch attending the Social Leadership Institute. He then joined the Israel Defense Forces and served in the Golani Brigade and the Shayetet 13 naval unit. He subsequently studied for a bachelor's degree in security and Middle Eastern studies at the Tactical Command Academy, after which he became a company commander in the Egoz Unit. After leaving the army he began studying for a master's degree in diplomacy and security at Tel Aviv University. During his studies he established the Tavor Academy for Social Leadership in Nazareth Illit in 2010.

== Political career ==
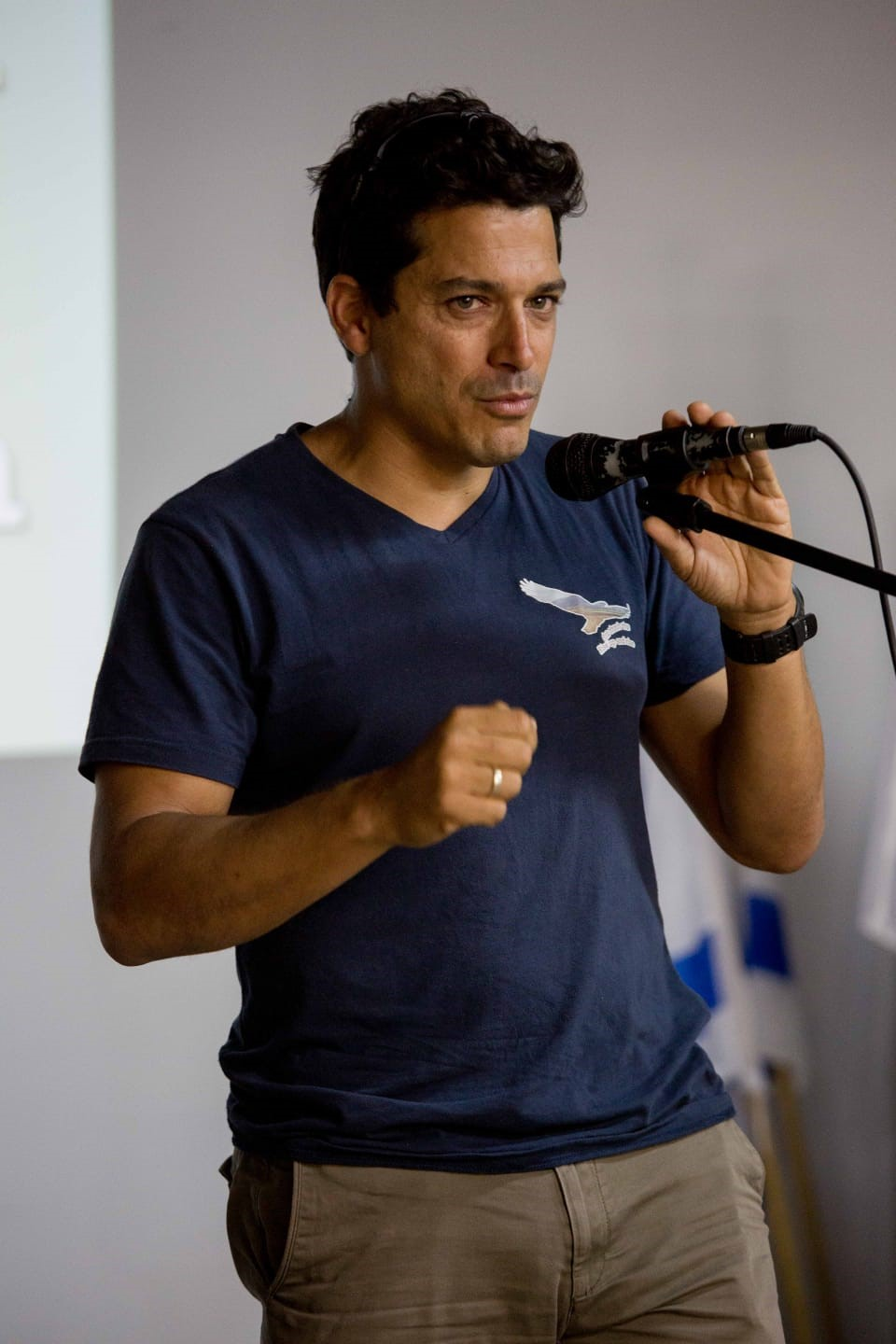
Chikli in 2021

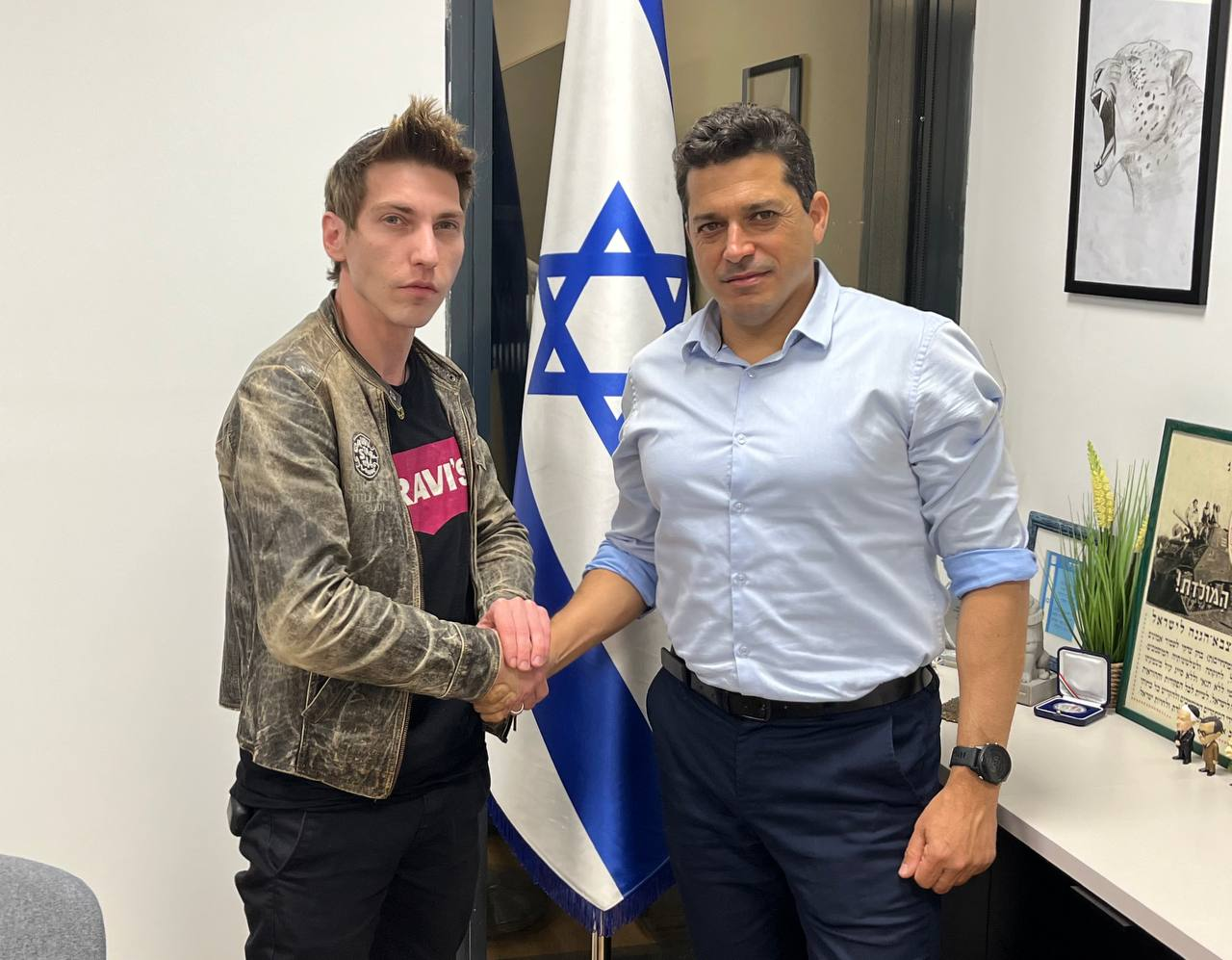
Russian-Israeli blogger Ezra Mor and Chikli in 2024

Entering politics, Chikli was ninth on the New Right list for the April 2019 elections, but the party failed to win a seat. He was then fifth on the Yamina list, for the 2021 elections and elected a Member of the Knesset (MK) when Yamina won seven seats. After Yamina joined a coalition government that included Meretz and an Arab party, Chikli voted against the new government in its investiture vote on 13 June 2021, the only Yamina MK to do so. In July 2021, he voted against the Citizenship and Entry into Israel Law that would prevent Palestinians from marrying Israelis and receiving citizenship, resulting in its failure to pass in a 59–59 tie vote.

Chikli voted against his party a total of 754 times, regularly assisting the opposition. On 25 April 2022, a Knesset committee voted 7–0 in favour of a request from Yamina to declare him a "retiree", meaning he could only run for the Knesset as part of a new party. Chikli was only the third Knesset member to be declared a retiree.

Chikli resigned from the Knesset in July 2022 to run on the Likud list in the 2022 legislative election, and was given the list's 14th spot. Judge Yitzhak Amit, chairman of the Central Election Committee, initially disqualified Chikli from running on the Likud list based on the allegation that Chikli violated election law in resigning from the Knesset only a few months after announcing his withdrawal from his party. Likud appealed to the Supreme Court, which overturned his disqualification on 9 October. He was subsequently elected to the Knesset and sworn in on 29 December, before resigning on 17 January 2023 under the Norwegian Law after being named Minister of Diaspora Affairs and Combating Antisemitism. He served concurrently as Minister for Social Equality from 2022 to 2024. He resigned from the Social Equality ministry in January 2024 in an effort cut government spending amid the Gaza war.

On 16 January 2025 he vowed to resign from the government over a deal between Israel and Hamas to end the hostage crisis. He has insisted that Israel maintain a presence on the Philadelphi Corridor on the Gaza-Egypt border or return to fight and achieve the goals of the war.

=== Diaspora Affairs Minister ===
As part of his position, he met leaders and rabbis in the diaspora from the Reform, Conservative and Orthodox communities. He met Rick Jacobs, president of the Union for Reform Judaism in the United States. He also met leaders of the Orthodox Union, the Jewish Federations of North America and Agudath Israel of America.

In January 2023, at the Israeli American Council's conference in Texas, he discussed proposals to amend the grandchild clause of the Law of Return. He expressed concern that a high number of recent immigrants from former Soviet Union countries are not connected to Judaism and that many do not settle long-term in Israel. He announced that diaspora Jewry would be involved in any process to revise the law and that he supports compromise.

In 2023 Chikli launched a new initiative, Project Aleph Bet in collaboration with the Jewish Federations of North America to invest $40 million in the training of North American Jewish day school teachers. His ministry also launched the UnitED program, used by 650 Jewish day schools around the world. The program aims to strengthen Jewish identity, increase literacy regarding Israel and Zionism, build resilience amid antisemitism and bring participants closer to their diaspora Jewish communities.

Since the October 7 attacks in 2023, his ministry has sent twelve delegations of the families of the Israeli hostages in Gaza to countries around the world. The delegations have spoken in countries such as Mexico, Australia and Japan to raise awareness of the plight of their relatives and have also met with heads of state. As part of these delegations, the father of hostage Noa Argamani visited Japan and met with Yoko Kamikawa, the Minister for Foreign Affairs of Japan. Upon learning of Noa's survival and return to Israel, she and her father were invited to Tokyo at the invitation of the Israeli Ambassador to Japan and the US Ambassador to Japan, Rahm Emanuel.

His ministry also led over 100 civil initiatives since the attacks, allocating tens of millions of shekels to projects such as the Nova music festival exhibition, The Moment Music Stood Still. The touring exhibition in the United States memorializes the memory of the victims of the Nova music festival massacre. The exhibition attracted over 100, 000 visitors per month in New York. His ministry also launched a platform of information documenting concerning the 7 October attacks.

In October 2023 he also condemned Itamar Ben-Gvir, who had urged the Israeli Police to be prepared for widespread Arab Israeli unrest after 7 October. Chikli reiterated that "so far, the Arab population has shown much solidarity and responsibility." He continued: "And this is especially true for the Bedouin population in the Negev, which has suffered victims and missing people and is displaying responsibility and solidarity with quite a few initiatives for hosting families and helping distressed citizens."

Chikli also supports the hasbara efforts of former government spokesperson Eylon Levy. Levy's State of the Nation podcast, in which he interviews guests about Israel, antisemitism, and Jewish history, is partly funded by Chikli's ministry.

In May 2024 the Israeli government approved Chikli's proposal to memorialize non-Israeli Jews in the diaspora that were murdered by perpetrators that had antisemitic motives. In the resolution that was passed it was agreed to set a date to commemorate the murdered Jews in the diaspora, to create physical monument and integrate their stories into the education system. A website and database will be open to the public to view details of the victims that are being memorialized.

In June 2024 he was interviewed by The Jerusalem Post Editor-in-Chief, Zvika Klein at the Jerusalem Post Annual Conference in New York. On rising rates of antisemitism in the diaspora, Chikli reiterated his ministry's mission to support the safety of diaspora communities, monitor antisemitism and investigate student organizations hostile to Israel. In August 2024, his ministry launched a new monitoring system, the National Command Post (“Mashlat”) to track online antisemitic discourse.

In January 2025 he was targeted by far right commentator, Candace Owens over an upcoming TikTok ban in the United States. Owens shared a conspiracy theory that Israel is responsible for the ban, sharing a clip of Chikli discussing his efforts to lobby TikTok to curb antisemitism on the platform.

In May 2026, following a meeting with the Israeli pro-settler organization, Nachala, Chikli said that establishing new Israeli settlements in northern Gaza should be a part of the Likud party's election platform, stating: "Settling the northern border area [of Gaza] should be a part of our election manifesto."

== Views and opinions ==
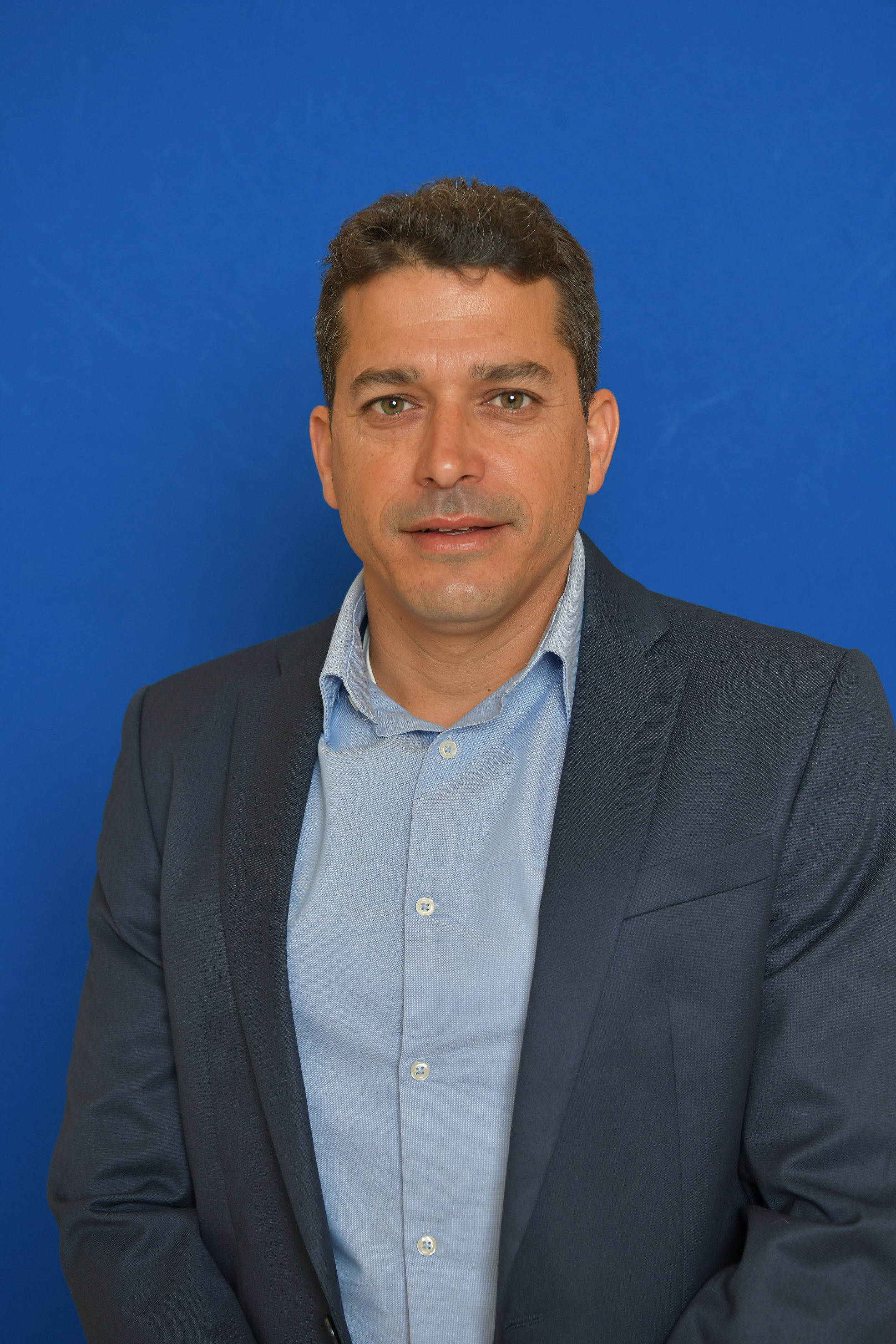
Chikli in 2022

In 2021 he distanced himself from any denominational affiliation: "I define myself as a Jew, without any additional [descriptors]." He criticized negative attitudes towards Conservative Judaism in Israel, arguing that the movement is "bound by halacha" and that the movement's egalitarian prayer should not warrant vitriol. He supports egalitarian prayer, at the Western Wall and the Kotel compromise. Egalitarian prayer—where men and women are permitted to pray side by side—is generally opposed by Orthodox Judaism.

Chikli has criticized the Reform Judaism for what he perceives as the movement's characterization of settlers as "violent". However, when Chikli was asked about Reform Jews at the Betar World Conference in Jerusalem in January 2023, he responded "we will back any Jew regardless of their backgrounds and beliefs." His father, a Conservative rabbi, has spoken of his son's "openness and "tolerance of inclusion" towards different streams of Judaism.

In 2022, he condemned Tel Aviv Pride as a “disgraceful vulgarity.” In a 2023 interview, he distanced himself from his earlier comments, asserting that previous that they had been taken out of context: "I was comparing between the parade in Jerusalem and Tel Aviv, where in some parts they undress in the street, and that looks vulgar to me". Earlier in the year, he criticized a Haredi rabbi on Twitter after the rabbi had condemned Amir Ohana, the openly gay Knesset speaker.

In January 2023, Chikli stated that the Palestinian Authority is a "neo-Nazi entity" and anti-semitic and that it was necessary to "examine alternatives to its existence".

In a February interview, he characterized the Boycott, Divestment and Sanctions movement as the most "antisemitic movement on the face of earth." Chikli has also accused former Prime Minister Yair Lapid of spearheading the Boycott, Divestment and Sanctions movement, because of his plans to criticize the new Israeli government when addressing Jewish audiences in the United States. In March, Chikli decried a surge of antisemitism in the United Kingdom, adding that London has become the most hostile city for Jews in the West and that Jewish residents and visitors feel forced to hide their identity for safety reasons.

That May, Chikli faced criticism for defending Elon Musk. Musk had written tweets about Jewish philanthropist George Soros that were condemned as anti-Semitic by the Israeli Foreign Ministry and the Anti-Defamation League. Chikli accused Soros of "[financing] the most hostile organizations to the Jewish people and the state of Israel". In June, he was criticized on Twitter by J Street. Chikli responded by condemning the group as a "hostile organization that harms the interests of the state of Israel". He characterized J Street's support for the Iran Nuclear Deal as being against Israel's interests. The same month, in a visit to New York City, Chikli was photographed at the Israel Day Parade giving the middle finger to protesters opposing Benjamin Netanyahu's proposed judicial reforms. Chikli subsequently accused critics who shared the photograph on social media of spreading fake news. A senior Biden administration official subsequently claimed that Chikli "does not understand the American Jewish diaspora."

In September, he stated that the IDF had the right to 'take over' areas in Southern Lebanon from which missiles could be fired into Israel. The next month, his ministry published a report on antisemitism in Canada since the 7 October attacks. That December, he criticized Canadian Prime Minister, Justin Trudeau for being the only G7 leader to not have visited Israel since the 7 October attacks, and stated that “Canada is no longer safe for Jews,” citing recent synagogue attacks.

In December, he praised the Swedish government for its decision to stop funding UNRWA, adding that the aid organization “has lost its legitimacy to exist” amid the involvement of staff members in terror activities. The same month, he criticized Pope Francis over a Vatican nativity scene display that featured a keffiyeh. In a letter addressed to the Pope, Chikli wrote: "There is no other way to understand this decision than as a deliberate adoption of the Palestinian narrative". He also condemned the Pope for having recently said that Israel "might be" committing genocide: "As a nation that lost six million of its sons and daughters in the Holocaust, we are especially sensitive to the trivialization of the term ‘genocide’—a trivialization that is dangerously close to Holocaust denial."

=== Ties to European far-right parties ===
Chikli has ties to various far-right European political parties. Chikli has said that “Antisemitism is a growing problem in Europe due to Muslim immigration. The European right wing parties have a point, because they realize the problem and are presenting a solution... They understand the challenge of radical Islam and they are willing to take the necessary steps.” Chikli has praised the leadership of Prime Minister of Hungary Viktor Orban, saying that "It is Hungary's robust conservative leadership that ensures Jews can walk through the streets safely, unlike in other European capitals, where, notably in London, Jews require armored vehicles for safe passage. Hungary is today the safest country for Jews in Europe who do not need armed fighters at the entrance of their institutions, thanks to responsible immigration policy." Chikli has defended Orban from accusations of antisemitism. Chikli spoke at CPAC Hungary, where he again praised Orban. Chikli spoke alongside Tom Van Grieken, the leader of Belgian Vlaams Belang, who has endorsed the Great Replacement Theory. Chikli further spoke at a conference hosted by Vox, a Spanish political party with links to Neo-Nazis. In July 2024 Haaretz accused Chikli of actively supporting Marine Le Pen, the French nationalist leader, after he made comments on Kan radio that she would be "excellent for Israel" for her "firm stance" against Hamas, the International Criminal Court, and antisemitism.

In March 2025, Chikli organized an international conference on antisemitism, hosted in Jerusalem, to which he invited several politicians belonging to far-right European parties. Jordan Bardella of France’s National Rally, Hermann Tertsch of Vox and members of the Swedish Democrats all spoke at the conference. Israeli President Isaac Herzog and several Jewish leaders declined to attend the conference due to the far-right invitees belonging to political parties with a history of antisemitism. Benjamin Netanyahu, however, spoke at the conference.

In October, Chikli invited Tommy Robinson, a British far-right anti-Islam activist with a history of criminal convictions, to Israel. Chikli praised Robinson as a “courageous leader on the front line against radical Islam.” The Jewish Leadership Council and the Board of Deputies of British Jews criticized Chikli for inviting Robinson, releasing a joint statement denouncing Robinson as a "thug". They further criticized Chikli for "ignor[ing] the views of the vast majority of British Jews, who utterly and consistently reject Robinson and everything he stands for.” They denounced Chikli as a "Diaspora Minister in name only." When Robinson arrived in Israel, Chikli escorted Robinson to multiple locales. Robinson and Chikli met with anti-immigration activist Sheffi Paz. A Knesset committee ordered Chikli to apologize to British Jews for inviting Robinson.

That November, Chikli met with Laura Loomer, an American conspiracy theorist who has described herself as a “proud Islamophobe”, in Jerusalem. He called her "a courageous woman, who clearly understands the threats facing the West from radical Islam and its growing influence in the US."

== Personal life ==
He is married to Hadas, a school psychologist in Nahalal, with whom he has three children. They live on Kibbutz Hanaton in northern Israel. He occasionally attends the kibbutz's Conservative synagogue.

He cancelled a planned trip to the European Parliament in Brussels in January 2025 amid legal action initiated by the Hind Rajab Foundation. The Israeli Prime Minister’s Office cited “specific security warnings” and advice from security agencies as the reason. Chikli claimed Brussels had become “unsafe for Jews and Israelis.” However, the HRF accused him of evading accountability, asserting the cancellation aimed to avoid potential arrest over alleged war crimes, not genuine safety concerns. Belgian authorities noted Chikli lacked diplomatic immunity as his visit was unofficial and he risked the possibility of arrest.
