= Midreshet Tavor for Zionist Leadership =

- המדרשה למנהיגות ציונית תבור
- Israel

Information
- Established: Amichai Chikli, Ofir Shik

Midreshet Tavor for Zionist Leadership is a seminary that was established in 2010 in Nof HaGalil and expanded to Kibbutz Ramat HaShofet.

The seminary operates several programs, including the "Tavor" Mechina, Keshet - a unique youth leadership program, Hetz - combining combat fitness and preparation for the IDF with additional academic content, a variety of post-military programs for released soldiers ("The Minibus" and "Highway 90"), and the Tavor Institute which conducts educational activities for IDF personnel and teaching.

As of 2023, the seminary is headed by Amit Drei.

== The Tavor Pre-Military Preparatory Program ==
In 2019, a year of pre-army service year, "Keshet - Tavor" was also opened at the preparatory program. The role of the national service members is mainly volunteering with the population of the Galilee and instructing the Keshet program.

=== Operation of the Mechina Program ===
During the year at the Mechina program, the Mechina (who defer their military service for a year) focus on studying various topics, such as Zionism, Israeli society, leadership, Judaism, political science, communications, Middle Eastern studies, general philosophy and social psychology. At the same time, the program emphasizes instilling educational values in its participants, including nurturing Jewish-humanistic-Zionist identity and nurturing intellectual curiosity and critical thinking.

In addition, special seminars are held at the preparatory program during the year. In addition to studies, participants volunteer in the Galilee area and undergo physical and mental preparation workshops for military service. The declared values of the program are Zionism, excellence and friendship.

The program places an emphasis on social action. As part of this, participants conduct empowering activities for at-risk youth, children with special needs, and new immigrants, and participants also operate over ten different volunteer initiatives in the Galilee involving 300 children and teenagers from the city every week. Additionally, the program encourages participants to also engage in secondary personal projects, for example personal mentoring of children, assistance in special education schools and more.

In 2015, the preparatory program received media coverage when out of the 20 graduates of the last class at that time, 13 were accepted into elite IDF units (4 into the pilots course, 2 into the Shayetet 13 naval commandos, 3 into Sayeret Matkal special forces, 2 into the General Staff Reconnaissance unit, 1 into the "Skies" Intelligence program, and 1 into the naval officers course).

In June 2018, following the announcement of the suspension of the Bnei Tzion preparatory program's activities after the Zafit stream disaster, and in cooperation with Bnei Tzion's administration, the Council of Preparatory Programs and the Ministry of Education, it was decided to establish a "Moran" branch for the youths destined for the Bnei Tzion preparatory program. This branch operates in Kibbutz Ramat HaShofet.
