= Amarna letter EA 248 =

In Ancient Egypt, the Amarna Period (c. 1350 BC) saw diplomatic correspondence sent to the city of Akhetaten (Amarna), providing valuable insights into the political situations at the time.

The Amarna Letter EA 248 (EA 248) is a fragmented letter by Yashdata, a displaced ruler, to the Pharaoh, also mentioning Biridiya of Megiddo.

== Translated Text ==
Say [to] the king, my lord, Sun and god: Message of Ya(shd)ata, the loyal servant of the king and the dirt at the feet of the king. I fall at the feet of the king, my lord, Sun and god, 7 times and 7 times.

[9-22] May the king, my lord, know that everything the king, my [l]ord, gave to [his] servant, the men of Than[ak]a [have m]ade off with; they have slaughtered my oxen and driven me away. So I am now with Biridiya. May the King, my lord, take cognizance of his servant.

== Akkadian Text ==
EA 248

248:001 [a-na ]m.LUGAL-ri EN-ia

248:002 u d.UTU u DINGIR.MEß-ia

248:003 qí-bí-ma um-ma m.ya-a[$-d]a-ta

248:004 ÌR ki-it-ti LUGAL-ri

248:005 ù ip-ri GÌR.MEß LUGAL-ri

248:006 a-na GÌR.MEß LUGAL-ri

248:007 EN-ia u d.UTU u DINGIR.MEß-ia

248:008 7-$u u 7-ta-a-an am-qut

248:÷÷÷÷÷

248:009 li-di-mi LUGAL-ru EN-ia

248:010 i-nu-ma gáb-bi mi-im-mì

248:$011 a yi-id-din LUGAL-[r]u

248:012 [E]N-ia a-[n]a ÌR[-$u]

248:013 n[a]m-$u-mi

248:014 L[Ú.M]Eß URU ta-ah-[na-k]a

248:015 [u] na-ak-$u-mì

248:016 GU4.MEß-ia ù

248:017 du-ub-bu-ru-ni

248:018 u a-nu-um-ma it-ti

248:019 m.bi-ri-di-ya

248:020 i-ba-a$-$a10-ku ù

248:021 li-di-mi LUGAL-ru

248:022 EN-ia a-na ÌR-$u

248:÷÷÷÷÷
