= Tribe of Zebulun =

One of the twelve Tribes of Israel

According to the Hebrew Bible, the Tribe of Zebulun (alternatively rendered as Zabulon, Zabulin, Zabulun, Zebulon; Hebrew: זְבוּלֻן, Modern: Zəvūlun, Tiberian: Zeḇūlūn, "dwelling; habitation; home") was one of the twelve tribes of Israel. Following the completion of the conquest of Canaan by the Israelite tribes in the Book of Joshua, Joshua allocated the land among the twelve tribes. The territory allocated to the tribe was located at the southern end of the Galilee, with its eastern border being the Sea of Galilee, the western border being the Mediterranean Sea, the south being bordered by the Tribe of Issachar, and the north by Asher on the western side and Naphtali on the eastern.

== Origin ==
According to the Torah, the tribe consisted of descendants of Zebulun, the sixth son of Jacob and Leah, from whom it took its name. Some Biblical scholars, however, view this as postdiction, an eponymous metaphor providing an aetiology of the connectedness of the tribe to others in the Israelite confederation. With Leah as a matriarch, Biblical scholars believe the tribe to have been regarded by the text's authors as a part of the original Israelite confederation.

=== Family tree ===
Zebulun	Merishah
Sered	Elon	Jahleel

== Character ==
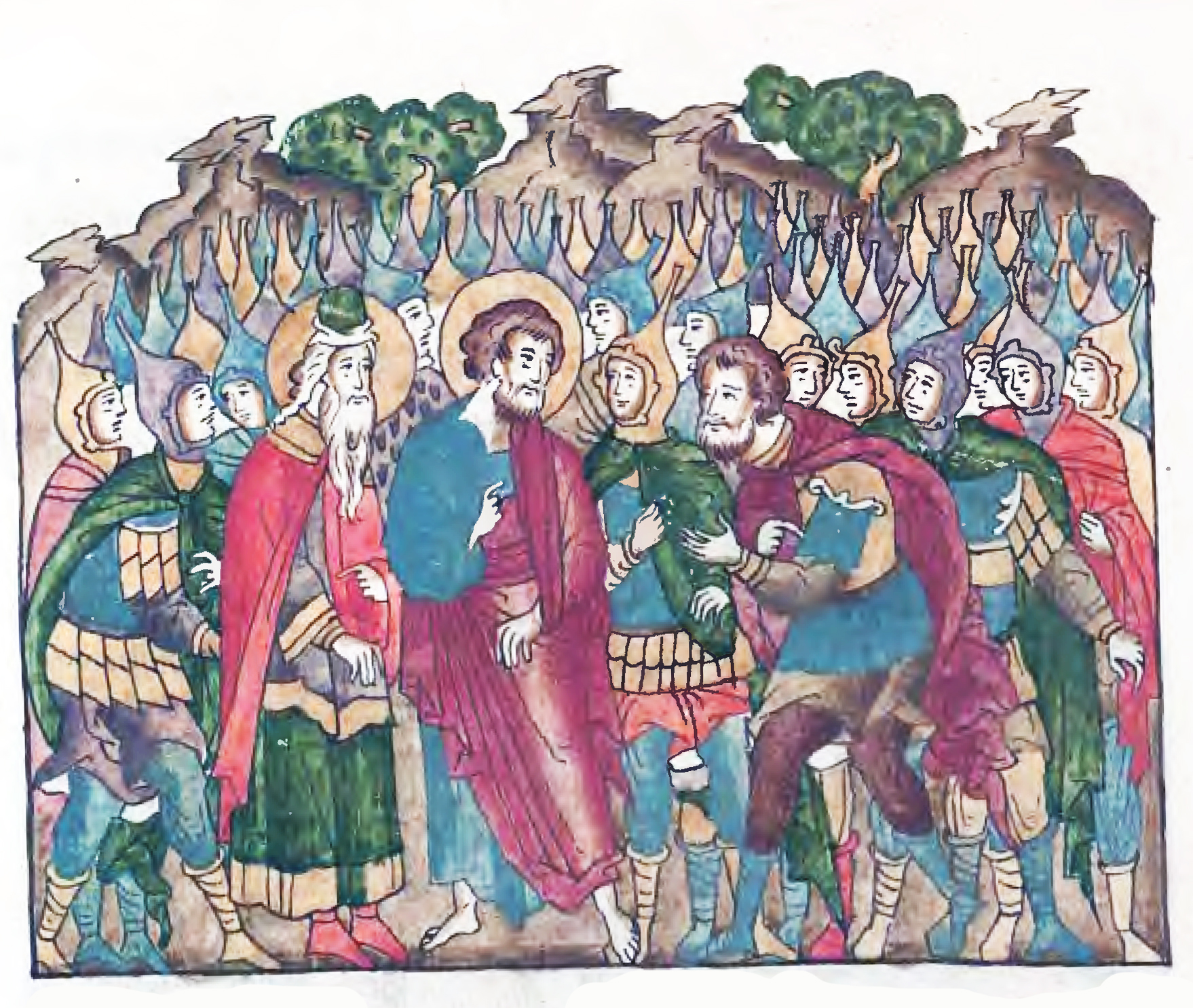
Moses counting Zebulun's kin

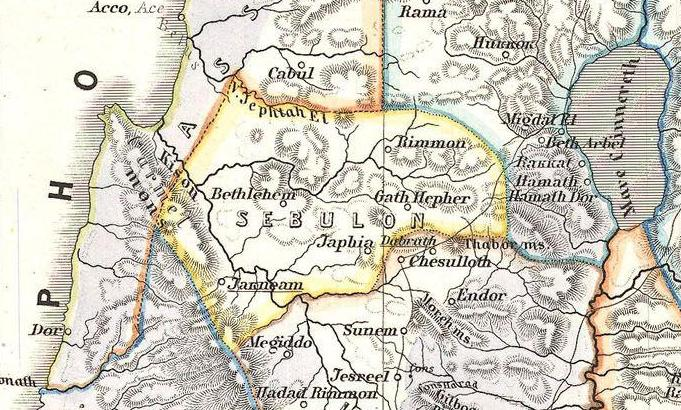
Territory of Zebulun (Sebulon), 1865 map

In the ancient Song of Deborah, Zebulun are described as sending to the battle those that handle the sopher shebet. Traditionally this has been interpreted as referring to the "rod of the scribe", an object that in Assyrian monuments was a stylus of wood or metal used to inscribe clay tablets, or to write on papyrus; thus, those who wielded it would have been the associates/assistants of lawgivers. Consequently, in Jewish tradition, the tribe of Zebulun was considered to have a symbiotic relationship with the tribe of Issachar, its neighbour and a tribe that traditionally was seen as having many scholars, whereby Zebulun would financially support Issachar's devotion to study and teaching of the Torah, in exchange for a share of the spiritual reward from such learning; the terms Issachar and Zebulun came to be used by Jews for anyone engaged in such a relationship. More recent Christian scholarship, as expressed for example in translations such as the Revised Standard Version, instead render the description in the Song of Deborah of the people sent to battle by Zebulun as "those who handle the marshal's staff"; in other words, Zebulun had simply sent military officers.

The partnership between Issachar and Zebulun is in an ideological dispute between those who believe that conditions and trade can be made in the post-mortem wage and those who say that the wages of the next world cannot be traded (Hai Gaon).

== Role of the tribe ==
Map of the twelve tribes of Israel; Zebulun is purple

According to the Torah, the Tribe of Zebulun plays an important part in the early history of Israel. At the census of the tribes in the Desert of Sinai during the second year of the Exodus, the tribe of Zebulun numbered 57,400 men fit for war. This army, under the command of Eliab the son of Helon, encamped with Judah and Issachar east of the Tabernacle and with them made up the vanguard of the line of march. Among the spies sent by Moses to view the land of Canaan, Gaddiel the son of Sodi represented Zebulun.

At Shittim, in the land of Moab, after 24,000 men were slain for their crime, a second census was taken; Zebulun numbered 60,500 fighting men. Elizaphan the son of Parnach was chosen to represent Zebulun at the division of the Promised Land.

During the rule of Joshua it received no special mention. In the Song of Deborah, the tribe is specially singled out as having "offered their lives to death in the region of Merom,"; and praised because there came "out of Zebulun they that led the army to fight," as in Hebrew, "they that carry the pen of the writer," i.e., such as recruiting and inspecting officers.

The reference is to Barak's campaign against Sisera, the commander of the forces of Jabin, King of Canaan. They answered the call of Gideon and joined in battle against Madian; and gave to Israel Elon, who judged it ten years. Among those that followed David to Hebron to make him king were 50,000 fully armed men of Zebulun with no double heart, who brought with them, as sign of their hearty allegiance, bounteous supplies of meat and drink to celebrate the accession of their new ruler. When Hezekiah made reparation for the abominations of his father Ahaz, he invited all Israel to keep the Passover in the house of the Lord. Mockery and ridicule met the emissaries of the reformer; yet some were true to the religion of their fathers, and, even from far away Zebulun, went up to Jerusalem, destroyed the idols, and kept the feast of the unleavened bread.

== Division of the land ==
At the division of the land of Israel among the seven tribes not yet provided for, the lot of Zebulun was third. The tribe's territory started with Sarid (Joshua 19:10), which is supposed to have been Tel Shadud, some five miles southwest of Nazareth. Zebulun's boundaries have not been made out. Of the nineteen proper names that the book of Joshua gives to guide us, only Bethlehem of Galilee (Beit lahm, seven miles northwest of Nazareth) can be identified with certainty, although the archaeological site Tel Hanaton is associated with the city Hanaton listed as the boundary with Asher. The historian Josephus assigns to Zebulun the land near to Carmel and the sea, as far as the Lake of Genesareth. To its northwest lay Asher, to the southeast Issachar. It included a part of the Jezreel Valley, and the great highway from the sea to the lake. According to Christianity, within the territory of Zebulun, Jesus was raised, and did and said much that is narrated in the Gospels, especially in the Synoptics, about his Galilean ministry.

According to the account in the Book of Genesis, the western boundary of the tribe of Zebulun is the sea: "Zebulun will reside at the seashore, And he shall be a harbor for ships" (Genesis 49:13). However, in the descriptions of its territorial borders in the Book of Joshua, it is stated that its western boundary is the Kishon River, with the tribe of Asher located to its west. Various attempts have been made to resolve this contradiction, including those by Ishtori Haparchi, the Vilna Gaon, the Malbim, and others. However, the geographer Micha Klein proposed a solution based on a paleo-geographic study he conducted. According to his research, the ancient Haifa Bay was both deeper and further south, extending as far as the area of Kibbutz Yagur today. Based on this study, the different verses can be reconciled as follows: the territory of Zebulun extended to the area of present-day Kibbutz Yagur, where the Kishon River flows nearby, to the west of which was a small inlet, and to the north of it was the tribe of Asher. According to this interpretation, the tribe of Zebulun indeed had access to the sea, through which they could sail ships and engage in trade.

The tribe of Zebulon's lot included the land which lay as far as the Lake of Genesareth, and that which belonged to Carmel and the sea.

== Fate ==
As part of the Kingdom of Israel, the territory of Zebulun was conquered by the Assyrians, and the tribe exiled; some in the tribe managed to flee south to the Kingdom of Judah. In any case the manner of Zebulun tribe's exile or emigration led to their further history being lost.

Israeli Knesset member Ayoob Kara has speculated that the Druze are descended from one of the Lost Tribes of Israel, probably Zevulun. Kara stated that the Druze share many of the same beliefs as Jews, and that he has genetic evidence to prove that the Druze were descended from Jews.

In the framework of British Israelism, the Netherlands is identified with the Tribe of Zebulun, due to its location by the North Sea supposedly being the fulfilment of Genesis 49:13.

== See also ==
- Zebulun
- Tribe of Issachar
