= Surata (Akka mayor) =

Surata was the Ruler of Akka (Akko; Acre, Israel) during the Amarna Period in the Late Bronze Age.

== Reign ==
He ruled the city of Akko during the Amarna Period in the reigns of Akhenaten and Tutankhamen. In letters he refer to himself with the title LU (Man, Petty King) which is subordinate to LUGAL (Big Man, Great King).

=== Amarna Archive ===
Surata is mentioned in Amarna Letters from Akko (EA 232), Byblos (EA 085), Gath (EA 366), and Megiddo (EA 245).

Amarna Letter EA 232 was written by Surata to the King of Egypt (unnamed). In this letter he is just trying to flatter the king.

==== The Labaya Affair ====
In Amarna Letter EA 245, he is known for letting the rebel Labaya of Shechem go in exchange for silver. Also mentioned is Yasdata (EA 245, EA 248).

==== Habiru ====
In Amarna Letter EA 366, Suwardata of Gath informs the King of Egypt (unnamed) of hostilities against the habiru. Ir-Heba, Surata of Akko and Intaruta of Aksapa came with 50 chariots to aid.

=== Succession ===
Surata of Akko was succeeded by Satatna (EA 233, EA 234, EA 235+EA327).

== Bibliography ==
- William L. Moran (1992) The Amarna Letters
