= Kotel compromise =

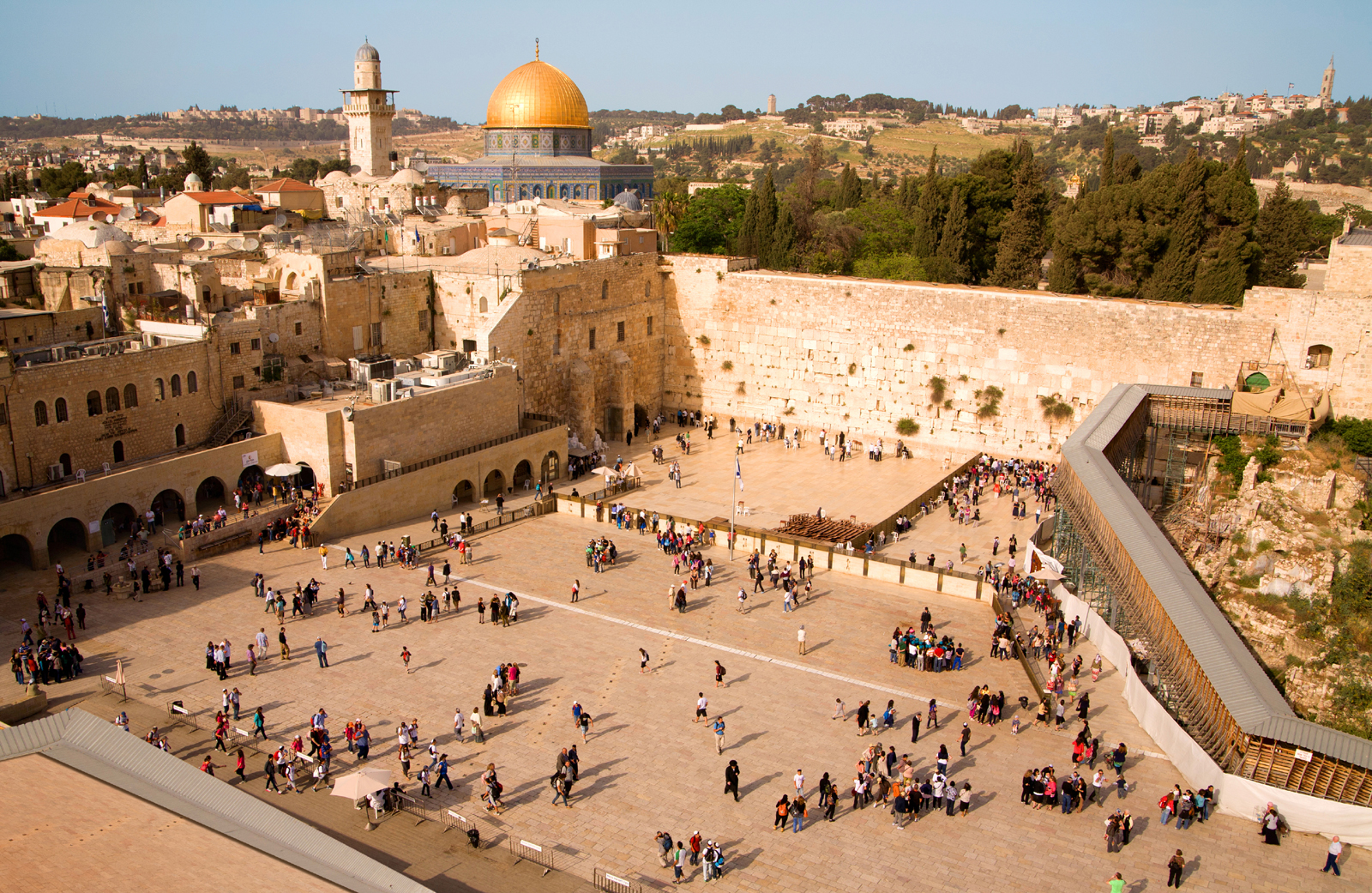
Western Wall

The Kotel compromise (or Western Wall compromise or Kotel plan or Western Wall plan, Hebrew: מתווה הכותל, romanized: Mitveh Ha'Kotel, lit. 'The Western Wall outline') is a compromise reached between Orthodox and non-Orthodox Jewish denominations, according to which the non-Orthodox "mixed" prayer area for men and women was supposed to be expanded in the southern part of the Western Wall. In contrast to the existing situation, access to this "mixed" prayer area was supposed to be from the main entrance to the Western Wall, and in addition it was supposed to be run by a council which would contain representatives of the non-Orthodox denominations and women of the Wall.

The plan was approved by the Israeli government in January 2016, but under pressure from the ultra-Orthodox haredi parties, the government backtracked from the plan in June 2017.

In February 2026, the Knesset passed a bill on first reading granting the Chief Rabbinate control over the egalitarian section of the kotel, thus putting the Kotel compromise in even greater jeopardy.

== Background ==
The Western Wall was administered, by virtue of the "1967 Protection of Holy Places Law", by the Rabbi of the Western Wall since 1967 (a post that also existed from the beginning of the British Mandate until the rule of Jordan there). Due to its religious nature, the holy site adhered to customs of an Orthodox Judaism, separating men and women in the prayer plaza, women enjoined from commandments that are halakhically identified with men, such as putting on Tefillin, wearing a prayer shawl, and reading the Torah.

Women of the Wall is a group of women from various denominations of Judaism that was formed in the 1980s and demanded that freedom of prayer be given to women at the Western Wall, while embarking on a public and legal struggle. As part of the struggle they pray at the women section at the Western Wall every Rosh Chodesh, some wearing prayer shawls or tefillin, sometimes in conflict with other orthodox women worshipers who try to prevent them from praying in the women prayer plaza or from carrying out Torah scrolls.

At the end of January 2016, the government approved the Western Wall compromise, according to which the non-Orthodox prayer area (Ezrat Israel) adjacent to the Western Wall, designated for "mixed" men and women prayer, was supposed to be expanded, and its management was to be handed over to a public council that would include representatives of non-Orthodox organizations and women of the Western Wall. As a result, the ultra-Orthodox Haredi parties threatened in March 2016 to quit the coalition. In response, Prime Minister Benjamin Netanyahu formed a committee to revisit the plan. In June 2017, the plan was frozen under the pressure of the ultra-Orthodox Haredi parties.

The plan was a compromise between the liberal Jewish denominations and Orthodox Judaism. The agreement is that the existing orthodox prayer plaza will remain separate, and next to it will be an additional "mixed" prayer plaza for men and women.

== Main points ==
- There will be one entrance divided into three routes of inspection stations: women, men and "mixed", in a way that will enable each worshiper to choose which path they are taking. In the northern prayer plaza, customs of an Orthodox Judaism will be observed, and the southern prayer plaza will be according to Conservative Judaism and Reform Judaism. Both prayer plazas will have Torah scrolls, siddurim and tables for Torah reading.
- Regulations of the "1967 Protection of Holy Places Law" will be amended and will read: "...Local customs of this site (Minhag hamakom) will be based on the principles of religious pluralism and gender equality. Prayer in this site will be egalitarian and unsegregated, women and men together, without a partition."
- The egalitarian plaza will have several large and extensive levels. The plaza will spread out over an expanse that will include a raised prayer plaza (constructed) and all of the Herodian Street area. The entire prayer plaza will stand at almost 900 square meters, which is about 70% as large as the present men's section at the Western Wall and 130% larger than the present women's section.
- A Public Council, to be appointed by the Prime Minister, will be headed by the Chairperson of the Jewish Agency and six representatives from the Conservative Movement, the Reform Movement and Women of the Wall, alongside six professional representatives from the Prime Minister's office and various Ministries, as well as the Israel Antiquities Authority.
- The Prime Minister's office will assign a permanent annual budget of no less than 5,000,000 NIS for the management of the site, as well as the maintenance, marketing and religious services that will be provided to the public at-large.
