= Pirissi and Tulubri =

Pirissi and Tulubri are a pair of messengers of the 1350–1335 BC Amarna letters correspondence. Pirissi and Tulubri are the messengers of King Tushratta of Mitanni, and are referenced in Amarna letters EA 27, 28, and EA 29, (EA for 'el Amarna').

Queen Tiye of the letter is the Great Royal Wife of Amenhotep III-(Akhenaten's father–(Akhenaten=Amenhotep IV)). The letter EA 28 is by King Tushratta of Mitanni, sent to Akhenaten, King of ancient Egypt.

== Egyptian docket notation (in black), reverse of EA 23 ==
Shortly after Amenhotep IV-(Akhenaten) became Pharaoh of Egypt, Tushratta wrote letters(?) to Tiye his mother. The "docket" on the reverse of EA 23 states the following:

Regnal 2?-[year], first month of the Growing season, day 5?, when One(i.e. 1="the King") was in the Southern City (=Thebes) in the estate of "Rejoicing in the Horizon". Copy of the Naharin letter which the messenger Pirizzi (and) the messenger [Tulubri] brought. –(complete)

== The letters of Pirissi and Tulubri ==
Letter no. 12 of 13 by Tushratta to pharaoh:

=== EA 28, Title: "Messengers detained and a protest" ===
Letter no. 12 of 13-(to Akhenaten): (See here:

Para I

Say to Naphurereya-(Amenhotep IV), the king of Egyp[t], my brother, my son–in–law, who lo[ves me] and whom I love: Thus Tušratta, the king of Mittan[i] , your father–in–law, who loves you, your brother. For me all goes well-(šalāmu). For you may all go well. For your household, for Teye, your mother, the mistress of Egypt-("Mizri", see: Mizraim), for Tadu-Heba, my daughter, your wife, for the rest of your wives, for your sons, for your magnates, for your chariots, for your horses, for your troops, for your country, and for whatever else belongs to you, may all go very, very well-(dan-niš, dan-niš="MA.GAL", "MA.GAL").

Para II

Pirissi and Tulubri, [m]y messengers, I sent posthaste to my brother, and having told them to hurry very, very-(dan-niš, dan-niš) much, I sent them with a very small escort. Earlier, I had said this to my brother: "I am going to detain Mane, [my brothers's] messenger, until [my] brother lets my messengers go and they come to m[e]."

Para III

And now my brother has absolutely refused to let them go, and he has put them under very strict detention. What are messengers? Unless they are birds, are they going to fly and go away? Why does my brother suffer so about the messengers? Why can't one [sim]ply go into the presence of the other and hea[r] [the ot]her's greeting, [and] both of us rejoice very, very-(dan-niš, dan-niš) much every day?

Bottom & damaged para IV

May my [brother] let my messengers go promptly so I [m]ay hear the greeting [of] my [broth]er ...

Para V

I want to let [Mane] go and I want to send [my] mess[engers to m]y [brother] as in the past, [that] I may h[ear] my brother's former ... [...] ... He went to my brother, and may my brother do absolutely every thing I want and not cause me dist[ress].

Para VI

Teye, your mother, knows all the words that I spoke with yo[ur] father. No one else knows them. You must ask Teye, your mother, about them so she can tell you. Just as your father-(Amenhotep III) always showed love to me, so now may my brother always show love to me. And may my brother listen to nothing from anyone else." -EA 28, lines 1-49 (with lacunae, (lines 32-36, etc.))

A similar consultation/exhortation to Queen Teye can be found in letter EA 26, written to Teye, entitled: To the Queen Mother. In the second paragraph of the letter, (lines 7-18), Tushratta talks privately to Teye, and ends by saying: "...who knows much better than all others the things [that] we said [to one an]other. No one [el]se knows them (-as well)."

In EA 27, and 29, the names of the messengers are partial, or in sections of missing/damaged characters-(lacunae).

== See also ==
- Tadukhipa-(Tadu-Heba)
