= Biridiya =

Ruler of Megiddo

King of Megiddo
- Reign: c. 1350 BC

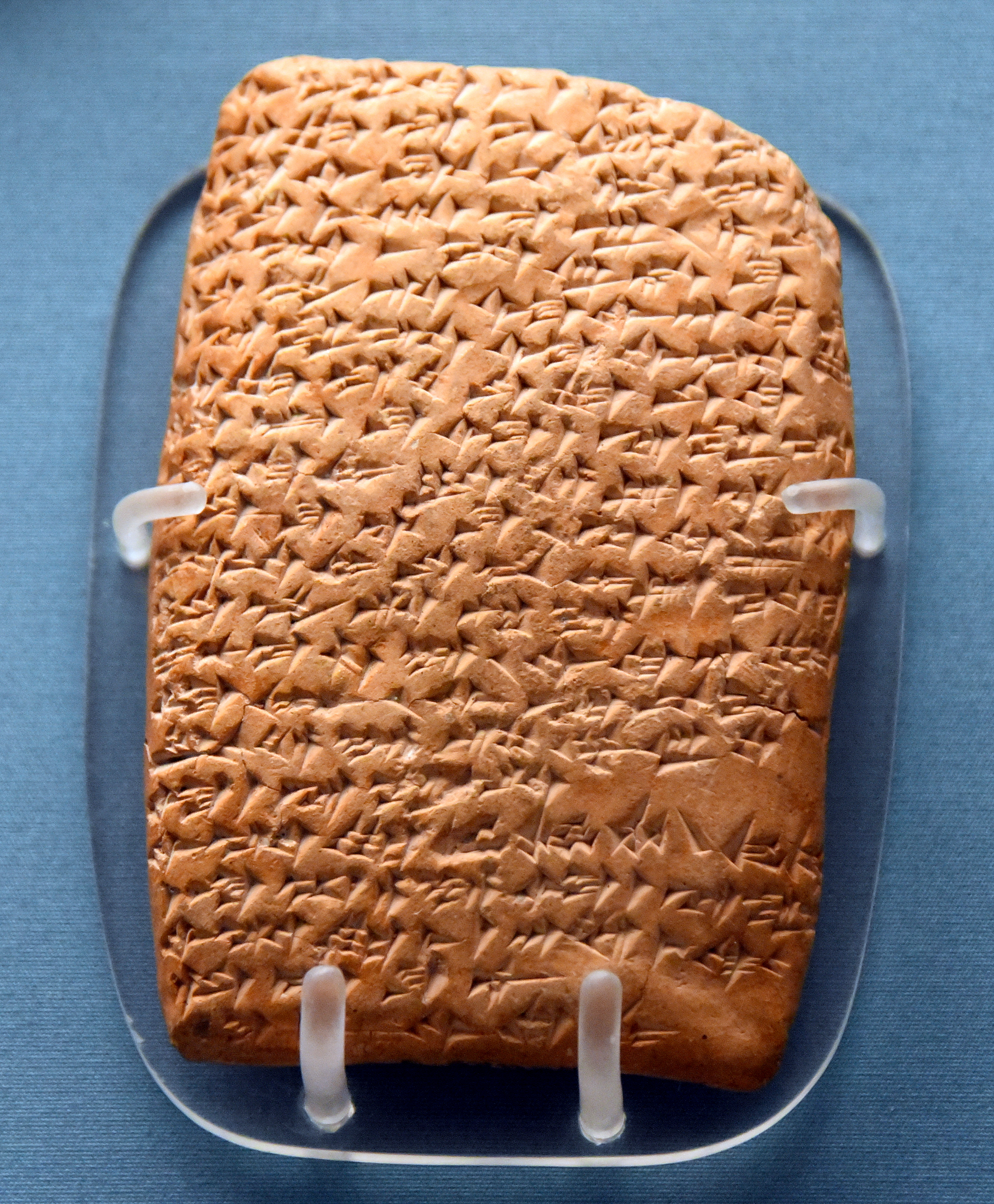
Amarna letter EA 245 from Biridiya, King of Megiddo, to the Egyptian Pharaoh Amenhotep III or his son Amenhotep IV around 1350 BC. From Tell el-Amarna, Egypt. British Museum.

Biridiya (fl. c. 1350 BC) was the king of Megiddo, northern part of the southern Levant, in the 14th century BC. At the time, Megiddo was a city-state and a vassal to Egypt. He was involved with the intrigues of Labaya.

== History ==
Biridiya was the ruler of Magidda (Megiddo). At the time, Labaya of Shechem tried to expand his territory and power. Labaya attacked Megiddo (EA 244) forcing the people to flee inside the city walls and making it impossible to harvest fields. Both Biridiya and Yashdata (EA 248/EA 245) attacked Labaya, apparently with the support of Suruata of Akko. At one point Suruata took Labaya away from Megiddo to send him by boat to the Pharaoh, but he received a ransom and released Labaya (EA 245).

=== Amarna Archive ===
In Egypt, the Amarna Archive contained letters authored by Biridya. The archive covers diplomatic correspondence from the time of Amenhotep III, Amenhotep IV, and Tutankhamen. He is also mentioned in other letters. Turmoil emerge in Canaan in the late part of the reign of Amenhotep IV and into the reign of Tutankhamen who was to young to rule himself and was represented by commissioners.

- EA 242 | "Request granted" | Megiddo king Biridija to pharaoh #1 tells about his assets and that he is at war.
- EA 243 | "Around-the-clock-defense" | Megiddo king Biridija to pharaoh #2
- EA 244 | "Besieged by Labayu" | Megiddo king Biridija to pharaoh #3
- EA 245 | "Assignment of Guilt" | Megiddo king Biridija to pharaoh #4
- EA 246 | "The Sons of Labaya | Megiddo king Biridija to pharaoh #5 about the two sons of Labaya buying mercenaraies from the Habiru and the Suteans to wage war against Megiddo.
- EA 247 | "Who am I?" | Megiddo king Biridija (or Jasdata)
- EA 248 | "An Exiled Ruler" | Ja[sd]ata is exiled and writes to the Pharaoh that he is with Biridiya.

At Kumudi (modern Kamid al lawz) the name Biridiya is mentioned in a Letter KL 72:600. However, the origin of the letter has not been identified, and the content of the letter (request for return of personal property) makes it unlikely it was sent by the King of Megiddo.

== See also ==
- Hannathon, Biridiya letter EA 245, title: "Assignment of Guilt"
