= Hafid Salhi =

Dutch footballer

Personal information
- Date of birth: 4 January 1993 (age 33)
- Place of birth: Veldhoven
- Position: Midfielder

Senior career*
Years	Team	Apps	(Gls)
2012–2013	RKC Waalwijk	0	(0)
2014–2015	FC Lahti	23	(0)
2015	RKC Waalwijk	11	(0)
- * Club domestic league appearances and goals as of 13 May 2015 (UTC)

Hafid Salhi (born 4 January 1993) is a Dutch professional footballer who plays as a midfielder. He formerly played for FC Lahti and RKC Waalwijk.
