= Amarna letter EA 367 =

Ancient inscribed clay tablet

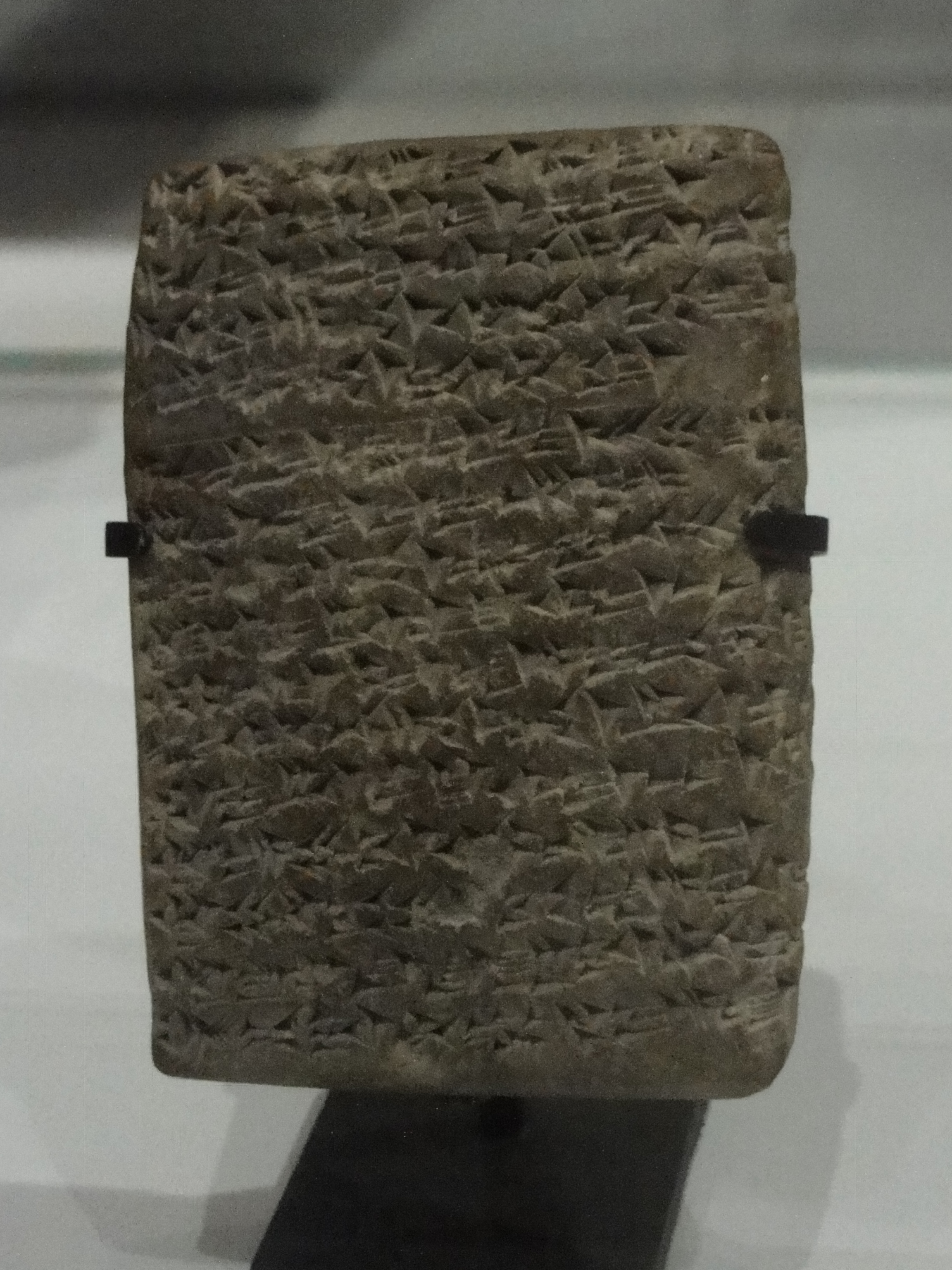
- Material: Clay
- Length: 7 cm
- Height: 11 cm
- Width: 1.9 cm
- Created: c. 1350 BC
- Present location: Louvre Museum, Ile-de-France, France
- Identification: AO 7095
- Language: Akkadian

Amarna letter EA 367, titled From the Pharaoh to a Vassal, is a medium-small, square clay tablet Amarna letter to Endaruta of Achshaph, (Akšapa of the letters), one of only about 10 letters of the el-Amarna corpus, that is from the Pharaoh of Egypt to his correspondent. (Two of the Pharaonic letters are lists, and not a 'letter' per se.)

The letter is distinctive in that, 1- there are basically no spaces between the Akkadian cuneiform signs, (lines 3, 4, 5 (end Para I scribe-line), and lines 6, 7, and 8), on the letter, and, 2- only a few segue-spaces (sections with no signs, except at the end of some text lines – no segue spaces in the middle of the text, tablet obverse). And, some text extends to the right (the cuneiform starts at the left margin) into the right side of the clay tablet's pillow shaped thickness, and further into the reverse side, which would appear upside down in the text of the reverse. (See photo of Amarna letter EA 9, bottom right of reverse, (line 6 from obverse, upside-down).)

EA 367 is about 3 in wide x 3.5 in tall, and is made of a dark clay. One trait of the letter is that the scribe uses some signs that have multiple alphabetic uses (um (cuneiform)-for umma ("message-thus"), also ṭup (=to 'um') of ṭup-pa for "tablet"), and gáb, for the Akkadian language, "gabbu", all ("everything"), and where gáb is the same sign for káb, in the spelling of some specific verbs.

Letter EA 367 is one of the Amarna letters, about 300, numbered up to EA 382, mid 14th century BC, from around 1350 BC-1335 BC. The initial corpus of letters were found at Akhenaten's city Akhetaten, in the floor of the Bureau of Correspondence of Pharaoh; others were later found, adding to the body of letters.

== Text of EA 367 ==
The following English and Akkadian text is from Anson Rainey, 1970, El Amarna Tablets, 359-379:

English:

(Line 1)--To Intaruta the ruler (man) (of) Akšapa
(2)--speak! Thus (says) The King: (i.e. Pharaoh)
(3)--Now this tablet (i.e. tablet letter) have I sent to you to speak
(4)--to you; and guard! — — may you be on guard over
(5)--the place(region) of the king that is assigned to you. (!)
(end Paragraph I, scribal-line)

(6)--Now, the king has sent to you
(7)--Hani son (of) Mairēya,
(8)--"chief of the stable" of the king in Canaan;
(9)--and to what he says to you listen
(10)--very carefully lest the king find in you
(11)--an evil deed. Every word
(12)--that he says to you listen to it very carefully,
(13)--and carry (it) out explicitly.
(14)--And guard! guard! Do not be slack;
(15)--and be sure that you prepare in anticipation
(16)--of the king's archer troops plenty of food,

Reverse

(17)--(and) plenty of wine (and) everything else.
(18)--Now he will reach you
(19)--very, very quickly;
(20)--and he will cut off the head
(21)--of the enemies of the king.
(Para II-III scribal-line)

(22)--and may you be apprised that
(23)--the king is fine (well) like the "sun"
(24)--in "heaven"; his infantry (and) his chariotry
(25)--are very, very well indeed!

Akkadian:

(Line 1)--a-na ^{I}In-Da-Ru-TÁ (amēl)LÚ ^{uru}AK-ŠA-PA
(2)--qí-bil(bí)-ma um-ma LUGAL-MA
(3)--a-nu-ma ṭup-pa a-na-a uš-te-bi-la-ku
(4)--a-na ka-a-ša ù uṣ-ṣur lu-ú na-ṣa-ra-ta
(5)--aš-ru LUGAL ša it-ti-ka
(end Paragraph I, scribal-line)

(6)--a-nu-um-ma LUGAL um-te-eš-še-ra-ku
(7)--^{I}Ha-A-NI DUMU ^{I}Ma-i-Re-iYa
(8)--"^{lú}(akil tarbaṣi)(PA.TUR)" ša LUGAL i-na ^{kur}Ki-Na-aH-Hi (i.e. Canaan)
(9)--ù ša i-qáb--bá-ku ši-ma-aš-šu
(10)--damqiš(SIG_{5}^{iš}) dan-níš la-a i-kaš-ša-dak-ku
(11)--LUGAL ar-na a-wa-ta gáb-bá
(12)--ša i-káb--bá-ku ši-ma-aš-šu damqiš(SIG_{5}^{iš}) dan-níš
(13)--ù e-pu-uš [ damqiš ](SIG_{5}^{iš}) dan-níš
(14)--ù uṣ-ṣur [uṣ]-ṣur la-a tá-mé-ek-ki
(15)--ù lu-ú šu-šu-ra-tá a-na pa-ni
(16)--ṣābē(ERIM.^{meš}) pí-ṭa-ti LUGAL akalu(NINDA("bread, loaf")) ma-a-ad

Reverse

(17)--karānu(GEŠTIN) gáb--bu mi-im-ma
(18)--a-nu-um-ma i-kaš-ša-dak-ku
(19)--ar-hi-iš ar-hi-iš
(20)--ù i-na-ak-ki-ís qaqqad(SAG^{ad})
(21)--a-ia-bé-e ša LUGAL
(Para II-III scribal-line)

(22)--ù lu-ú ti-i-dì i-nu-ma
(23)--ša-lim LUGAL ki-ma ^{d}UTU-aš
(24)--i-na ^{AN}sa-me-e ṣābē(ERIM.^{meš})-šu ^{giš}narkabātu(GIGIR^{meš})
(25)--ma-a-du ma-gal ma-gal šul-mu

== Obverse photo, EA 367, The Ancients in Their Own Words ==
A recent historical overview book (Kerrigan, 2009), The Ancients in Their Own Words, presents 104, steles, monuments, personal items, etc. (example the Kilamuwa Stela of King Kilamuwa). Each bi-page, opens to the next item (208 pages for 104 items). The Amarna letters cover one of these bi-pages with a historical discussion of the Amarna letters' text corpus. One photo occurs, the obverse of EA 367, where the entire compact text can be seen; the only segue space, occurs at the end of Paragraph I (line 5), with the scribe line below separating Para I from Paragraph II. The photo sits next to a letter text, a 'free-form, non-linear translation' (2009?) of a letter from Gintikirmil's mayor, Tagi to the Pharaoh; the letter is Amarna letter EA 264, titled The Ubiquitous King.

== See also ==
- Endaruta
- Amarna letters–phrases and quotations
- List of Amarna letters by size
  - Amarna letter EA 5, EA 9, EA 15, EA 19, EA 26, EA 27, EA 35, EA 38
  - EA 153, EA 161, EA 288, EA 364, EA 365, EA 367
