= Amarna letter EA 26 =

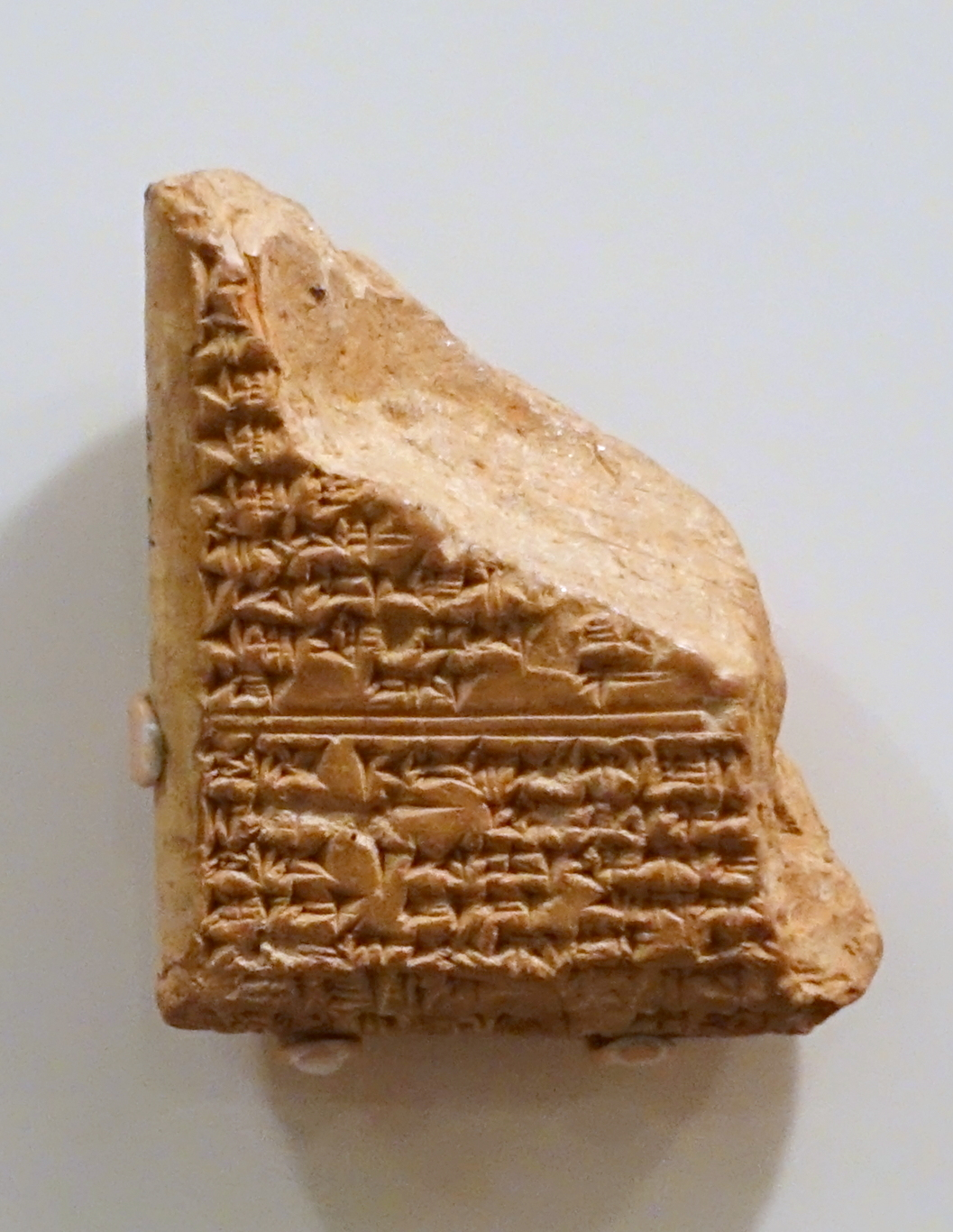
- Material: Clay
- Length: c. 9 cm
- Height: c. 15 cm
- Width: c. 3 cm
- Created: c. 1355 BC
- Language: Akkadian

Amarna letter EA 26, titled To the Queen Mother: Some Missing Gold Statues, is a shorter-length clay tablet Amarna letter from Tushratta of Mitanni. Unlike the next letter EA 27 from Tushratta, which is more than twice as tall, and about twice as wide-(XXVII paragraphs), EA 26 is topical and synoptic about recent events about the desire for 'gold statues' (VII paragraphs). The letter is addressed to the Pharaoh's wife, Teye, and its dimensions are around 6 inches (15 cm) tall, 3.5 inches (9 cm) wide, and 1 inch (3 cm) thick.

EA 26 has missing edges, left and right. The piece pictured is the Oriental Institute of Chicago's piece, acquired by Rev. Chauncey Murch at Luxor which is part of the obverse, lower-left corner, at the beginning of lines of text. The entire obverse of EA 26 can be seen here, with its missing edges and scuffed/eroded surfaces on the edges. The Oriental Institute piece shows the high quality of inscribed cuneiform, as visible in undamaged sections of EA 26.

== The letter ==
=== EA 26: To the Queen Mother: Some Missing Gold Statues ===
EA 26, letter 10 of 13 from Tushratta. (Not a linear, line-by-line translation.)

Obverse (see here:)
(Lines 1-6)--[Say] t[o Teye ], the mistrisss of Egy[pt]: T[hus Tuš]ratta, the king of [ Mittani. For me] all goes well. For you may all go w[ell. For your household, for] your sons, may all go well. For Tadu-Heba, [my daughter], your daughter-in-law, may all go well. For your countries, fo[r your troops,] and for whatever else belongs to you, may all go very, very [well].
(7-18)--You are the one that knows that I [myself] always showed love [to] Mimmureya, your husband, and that Mimmureya, [your] husba[nd], on the other hand, always showed love to me. A[nd the things] that I wou[ld write and] say [t]o Mimmureya, your husband, and the things that Mimmureya, your husband, [would alwa]ys write and say to me, you, [Keli]ya, and Mane know. But you are the on[e, on the other ha]nd, who knows much better than all others the things [that] we said [to one an]other. No one [el]se knows them (as well).

(19-29)--[And n]ow, you yourself [sai]d to Keliya, "Say to your lord: 'Mi[m]mureya,^{1} my husband, always showed love to yo[ur] father, and maintained (it) for you;^{2} he did not forge[t]^{3} his love for your father, and he did not cut o[ff]^{4} the [em]bassies that he had been accustomed to sending, one after the other. And now you are the one that must not forget your [l]ove^{5} for Mimmu[reya], your brother. Increase (it) f[or] Naphurre[y]a and maintiain (it) for hi[m]. You must keep on send[ing] embassies of joy,^{6} one after the other. Do not cut [them] off.' "
(30-39)--I will [not] fo[rget]^{8} the love for Mimmureya, your husband. More than ever be[fo]re,^{9} at this very moment, I show 10 times — much, much — more love to Naphurreya, your son. [Your are the one who knows] the words of Mimmureya, [your] husb[and, but] you did not s[end]^{10} all of my greeting-gift^{11} that [your husband ordered] to [be sent]. I had asked^{12} [your husband] for [statues] of sol[id] cast [gold], saying, "[May my brother send me] a[s my greeting gift,^{13} statues of solid cast gold and ... ... of gold] and genuine lapis lazuli."

Reverse (see here:)
(lines 40-48)—But now Nap[hurreya, your son], has plated [statues] of wood. With gold being the dirt [in your son's country, w]hy have they been a source of such dis[tress] to your son that he has not given them to me?^{14} Furthermore, I asked ... [... t]o give th[is].^{15} Is this love? I had sa[id], "Naphurre[ya, my brother], is going to treat me 10 times better that his father did." But now he has not [given me] even what his father was accustomed to give.
(49-57)—Wh[y] have you [no]t exposed before Naph[urreya] the words t[hat you your]self, and with your own mouth, said to [me]? If [you] do not expose them before him, and y[ou keep silent],^{16} can anyone [el]se know? Let [Nap]hurreya give me statues of sol[id] gold! He must cause me no [dis]tress whasover, nor [ ... ]. Let him treat m[e] 10 times better [th]an his father did, [wi]th love and evidence of es[teem].
(58-63)—May your own messengers g[o] regularly with the messen[gers o]f Naphurreya, with 5 [... t]o Yuni, my wife, and may the messen[gers o]f Yuni, my wife, [g]o regula[rly] to [you].
(64-66)–I [her]ewith [send] as your Greeting-gift [x] scent containers^{17} [filled] with "sweet oil," (and) 1 set of stones [set in gold].—(complete EA 26, lines 1-66, with various major & minor lacunae)

== Akkadian text ==
Text: Akkadian, sumerograms, Egyptianisms, etc.

Akkadian:

Obverse:
Paragraph I (see here )

(Line 1)--A-na MUNUS-Te-I-E NIN KUR M[i-iṢ-[ Ri-(Egypt) qí-bí-ma ]
(2)--umma 1.^{diš}-Du-uŠ-]RaT-Ta LUGAL [KUR Mi-Ta-]aN-Ni ana ia-ši
(3)--šul-mu ana ka-a-ši lu-ú šul-[-mu ana É-ka ana ]
(4)--DUMU-MEŠ-]-ka lu-ú šul-mu ana { MUNUS} Ta-A-Tu_{4}-Hé-Pa
(5)--É-GI_{4}-A-ka lu-ú šul-mu ana KUR.KUR-ka a-[ -na x(=ERIM)-ka
(6)--ù MIM.MU-ka dan-is dan-is lu-ú [ šul-mu ]

(1)--(To Tiye,..
--(1.3)--Mistress land Egypt (Miṣri),.. Speak!... )
(2)--('Message thus' 1.-Tushratta, King land Mitanni!..
--(2.8)--For me,.. )
(3)--(Peace,..
--(3.1)--For you,.. "may there be" Peace!..
--(3.7)--For (family)-Household-yours,.. )
(4)--((for) "Sons"-(compatriot)s(pl)-yours, "may there be" Peace!..
--(4.4)For Tadu-khipa,.. Daughter-mine,.. )
(5)--(Daughter-in-law-yours,.. "may there be" Peace!..
--(5.5)--For 'country-lands(pl)-yours,.. For Armys(pl)-yours,.. )
(6)--(and Everything-yours,...
--(6.5)--Strongly,.. Strongly, (fervently) "May it Be" Peace-full!... )

(Double-line ruling)
Obverse: Paragraph II

(7)--at-ti-i-ma ti-i-ta-a-an-ni,.. ki-i-me-e a-na-ku(?) itti--((K)âti idû,.. kīma itti )
(8)--1.^{diš}-Mi-iM-Mu-Ri-iYa, mu-ti-i-ka,.. ar-[-ta-na-'a-am!..--(1.Mimmuriya, mutu-ka,.. ra'āmu!.. )
(9)--ù 1.^{diš}-Mi-iM-Mu-Ri-iYa,.. ap-pu-na,.. mu-ut-[ ka?,.. ]--(Ù 1.Mimmuriya,.. appu,.. ?mahru? )
(10)--ki-i-me-e itti-ia,.. ir-ta-na-'a-am,.. [ ?ana? ?ia-ši? ]--(kīma itti-ia,.. ra'āmu,.. iāši!.. )
(11)--?Ù? 1.^{diš}-Mi-iM-Mu-Ri-iYa,.. mu-tu-ki,.. ša a-ša-[-ap-pa-ru,.. ]--(Ù 1.Mimmuriya,.. mutu-ka,.. ša šapāru,.. )
(12)--ù ša a-tap-bu-bu ù 1.^{diš}-Mi-iM-Mu-Ri-iYa--(ù,.. ša dabābu(discussed),.. Ù 1.Mimmuriya,.. )
(13)--[ x x ]-na? mu-ti-ki a-ma-te-meš,.. ana ia-ši-[ ša ]--([ xx ?idû ], mutu-ki amatu-meš,.. a-na(=itti) iāši-[?ša?]
(14)--[ xx ù ša š-]-ap-pa-ru,.. ù ša i-tap-bu-bu,.. at-ti-[ i ]--([ xx š]apāru,.. ù ša dabābu(discussed),.. #1-(k)âti ,.. )
(15)--1.^{diš}-iK-Li-iYa,.. 1.^{diš}-Ma-Né-E i-te,.. ù at-ti-[-i ]--(#2 1.-Keliya,.. #3 1.-Mane idû!.. Ù (k)âti )
(16)--[ x x ] [ x ]-šu-nu-ma ti-i-te a-ma-te-meš--([ x x ] [ x ] idû, amatu-meš, )
(17)-[ ša it-]ti ha-mi-iš,.. ni-id-bu-bu ma-am-ma--(ša itti ahāmiš,.. nadû mimma )
(18)--ša-nu-]um-ma,.. la i-te-šu-nu--(šanu,.. lā idû!..)

(7)--You know,.. (that) Always [ with.. ]
(8)--1.Mi-iM-Mu-Ri-iYa Husband-yours,.. "I showed Love"!...
(9)--..and 1.Mi-iM-Mu-Ri-iYa,.. foremost,.. ?topmost?,..
(10)--"always"(as/if) with-myself,.. "showed Love",.. 'to Me'!...
(11)--..And, 1.Mi-iM-Mu-Ri-iYa, Husband-yours,.. What sent,..
(12)--..and What "written about"(discussed),.. But 1.Mi-iM-Mu-Ri-iYa,..
(13)--[ ? knows ? ] Husband-yours,.. 'discussions', by Me!...
(14)-- [..But,.. What.. s]ent,.. and What "written about"(discussed),..
--(14.9)--#1-YOU,..
(15)-#2-1.-Keliya, and #3-1.-Mane,.. Know!..(are Aware-of)
--(15.8)--But You,..

(Double-line ruling)
Obverse: Paragraph III

(19)--[ Ù a-nu-]-um-ma,.. at-ti-i-ma,.. ana 1.^{diš}-Gi-Li-iYA--(Ù enūma,.. (k)âti,.. ana Keliya )
(20)--[ ta-aq-]-ta-bi ana,.. be-li i-ka,.. qí-bi i-me--(qabû,.. ..Ana Bēlu-ka:.. (^{Quote})Qabû.. )

Beginning of Line 21: 1. : Start of Fracture corner. Lines 23, 24, and 25, all begin with "And (But)" (Ù)

(21)--1.^{diš}-Mi-iM-Mu-Ri-iYa,.. mu-ti,.. it-ti a-bi-i-ka--(1.Mimmuriya,.. mutu,.. itti abu-ka,.. )
(22)--ir-ta-na-'a-am-me,.. ù ak-ka-a-ša,.. it-ta-ṣa-ar-ka--(..ra'āmu!.. Ù kâša,..itti-(him).. )
(23)--Ù,.. it-ti a-bi-i-ka,.. ra-'a-mu-ut-ta-šu!.. La im-še!..--(..Ù,.. itti abu-ka,.. ra'āmu!.. ..Lā mašû!.. )
(24)--Ù,.. har-ra-na,.. ša il-ta-na-ap-pa-ru,.. la ip-ru-[-us--(..Ù harrānu,.. ša (napharau)(commonplace),.. Lā parāsu!.. )

(19)--And now-(at-this-time),.. You,.. to Keliya,
(20)--..Say,.. to Lord-yours:.. (^{Quote})Say..
(21)--1.Mi-iM-Mu-Ri-iYa,.. Husband,.. with(concerning) Father-yours,..
(22)--"showed Love"!.. ..And You,.. with Him!..
(23)--..And,.. with Father-yours, "showed Love"!.. 'Never' forgetting!..
(24)—..And,.. "diplomatic trips" which commonplace,.. 'Not' stopping!..
(25)—..And .. Later You .. With 1.Mi-iM-Mu-Ri-iYa,..
(26)—..Brother-yours .. Loved !, .. Not Forgetting ..
(27)—1.Neb-Kheper-Ru-ia Great! .. And Send(Issue) ..
(28)—..And (But) "diplomatic trips" "which of" "to be joy" .. Return ..
(29)—..Not .... I..N..T..E..R..R..U..P..T.ing !!.. ^{(Unquote)}

Note: The last line of Para III, uses cuneiform: La, for "not" ("no"), Akkadian "lā", but of course, it is obvious, that the verb is spread across the entire last line, 29, as an embellishment, and an "exclamation", to the topic of Paragraph III. (The fractured piece has only the first two cuneiform characters, ta & pa, for Akkadian parāsu, meaning: "to separate, cut, decide"., and using English "interrupt". The rest of the verb is on the main letter piece, (See here: ; or Here: ).

== See also ==
- Tushratta of Mitanni
- Oriental Institute of Chicago
- Amarna letters–phrases and quotations
- List of Amarna letters by size
  - Amarna letter EA 5, EA 9, EA 15, EA 19, EA 26, EA 27, EA 35, EA 38
  - EA 153, EA 161, EA 288, EA 364, EA 365, EA 367
