= Munus =

Munus refers to either:

- Singular form of Latin munera, in ancient Rome, a duty or provision owed to a person or persons, living or dead
  - In particular, a gladiator game
- MUNUS, a Sumerian determinative indicating a female personal name
