= Amarna letter EA 153 =

Clay tablet from Tyre, Lebanon

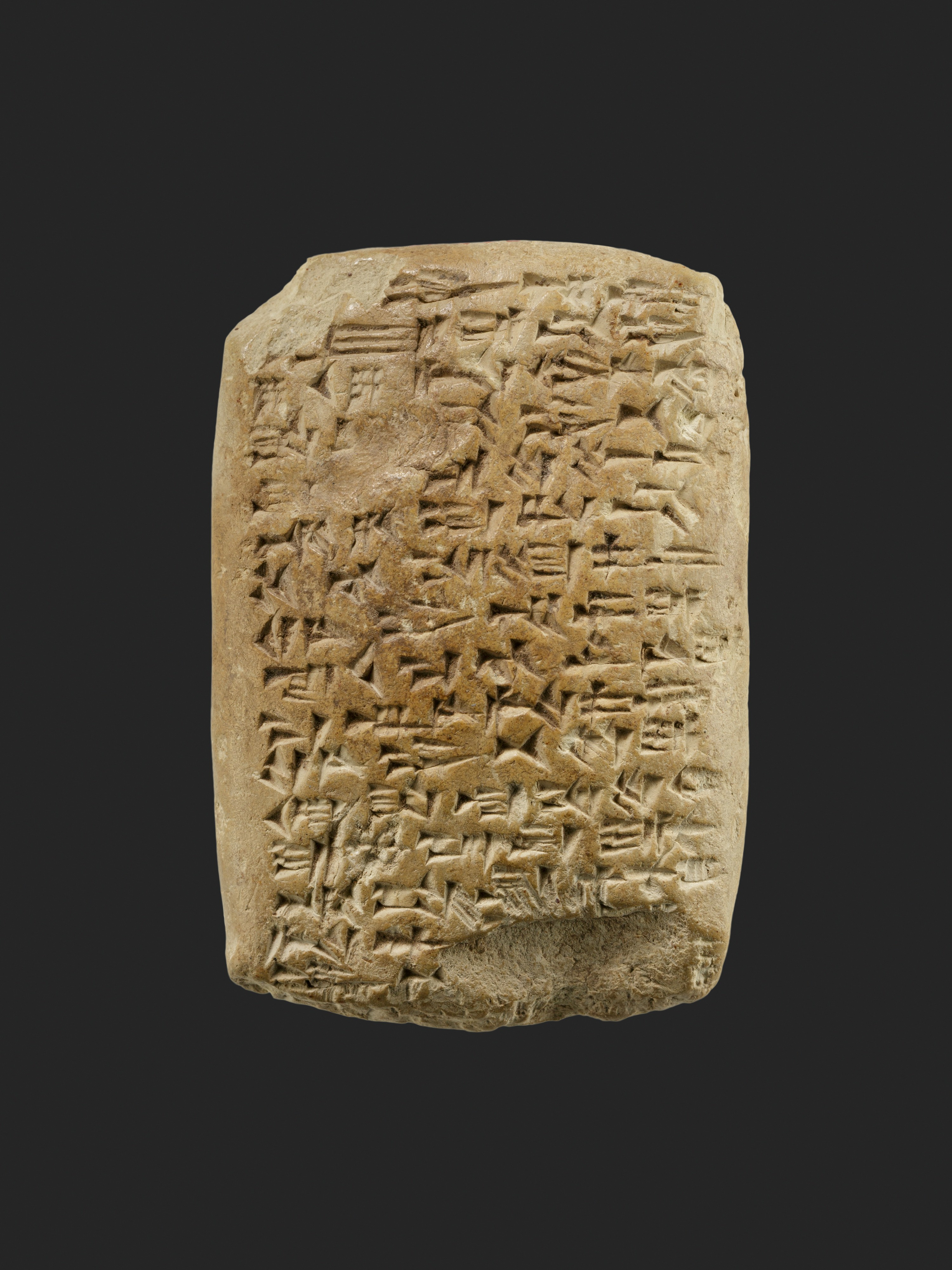
- Material: Clay
- Length: c. 5.2 cm
- Height: c. 7.7 cm
- Created: c. 1350 BC
- Present location: Metropolitan Museum of Art, New York, United States
- Language: Akkadian

Amarna letter EA 153, titled Ships on Hold, is a short-length clay tablet letter from Abimilki of the city-state of Tyre, an island at the time. The tablet is one of over 300 Amarna letters.

EA 153 is around 7.7 cm tall (3 1/16 in) × 5.2 cm long (2 1/16 in). It has a missing flaked, lower right corner on its obverse affecting two lines of text. One line repeats "...King, Lord-mine...", leaving only one line for more difficult restoration.

The letter shows a high-gloss surface on the clay tablet and, being a short letter, only has between five and nine cuneiform characters per line. It contains one special cuneiform sign for ship, MÁ, a sign used in both the Amarna letters and the Epic of Gilgamesh. The letter's scribe used mostly "very-short" stroked, and "fat-and-rounded" cuneiform strokes, instead of the more arrow-shaped, sharp, and linear strokes,. Since the letter also has distinct, medium-sized wedge strokes (for example, be) as well as L-shaped strokes (from an angled stylus), the scribe may have used two or more styluses.

The clay tablet letter is located in the Metropolitan Museum of Art, catalogued as object number 24.2.12.

== EA 153, obverse, bottom, and last lines ==
Moran's non-linear letter English translation (translated from the French language):

(Lines 1-3)--[To] the king, my lord: [Mes]sage of Abimilku,^{1} your servant. I fall at your feet 7 times and 7 times. ( "7 and 7 times" )
(4-5)--I have carried out what the king, my lord, ordered.
(2 repeat sections, 3 lines each)

(6-8)--The entire land-("country-side") is afraid of the troops of the king, my lord.
(9-11)--I have had my men hold ships at the disposition of the troops of the king, my lord.

(12-16)--Whoever has disobeyed has no family, has nothing alive. Since I gua[rd the ci]ty of the king, [my] lo[rd],
(obverse-bottom & reverse)
(17-20)--m[y] s[afety] is the king's responsibility. [May he take cognizance] of his servant who is on his side.^{2}--(obverse, bottom edge, and top of reverse, with lacunae restored, lines 1-20 complete)

== EA 153, Akkadian text ==
The Akkadian text, Metropolitan Museum of Art (Spar 1988).

Obverse
-(Line 1)--[ ana ] LUGAL EN-lí-ia
-(2)--[u]m-ma ^{I}Ia-Bi-LUGAL [ ÌR ]-ka
-(3)--7 u 7 ana GÌR.MEŠ-ka am-qut
-(4)--ša i[q-b ]i LUGAL be-li-ia
-(5)--šu-[ ut ] e-te-pu-uš
-(6)--pal-ha-at gabbu
-(7)--KUR-ti ištu pānu
-(8)--(ÉRIN)ERIM.MEŠ LUGAL EN-lí-ia
-(9)--su-hi-iz-ti LÚ.MEŠ-ia
-(10)--^{GIŠ}MÁ.MEŠ ana pānu
-(11)--(ÉRIN)ERIM.MEŠ LUGAL be-li-ia
-(12)--ù ša la iš-te-mi
-(13)--iānu É-šu iānu
-(14)--bal-tá-šu an-nu-ú
-(15)--ana-an-ṣ[ár UR ] U(?)
-(16)--LUGAL be-[ li-ia
Lower Edge
-(17)--[ šu-ul ]-m[i]
-(18)--mu-hi LUGAL li-[[-[de]
Reverse
-(19)--ana ÌR-šu ša
-(20--itti-šu

== See also ==
- Tyre
- Amarna letters–phrases and quotations
- List of Amarna letters by size
  - Amarna letter EA 5, EA 9, EA 15, EA 19, EA 26, EA 27, EA 35, EA 38
  - EA 153, EA 161, EA 288, EA 364, EA 365, EA 367

== EA 153 photo gallery ==
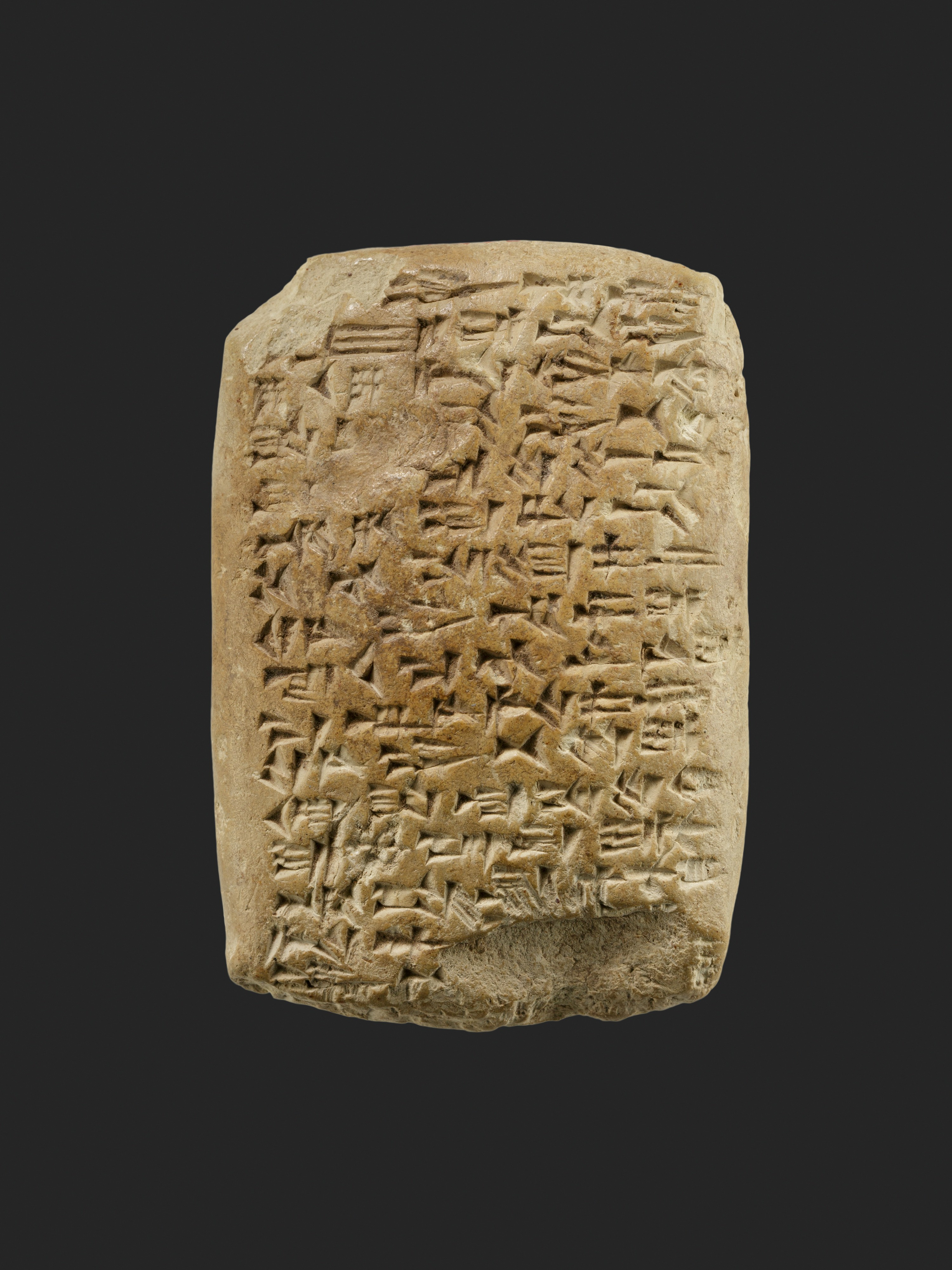

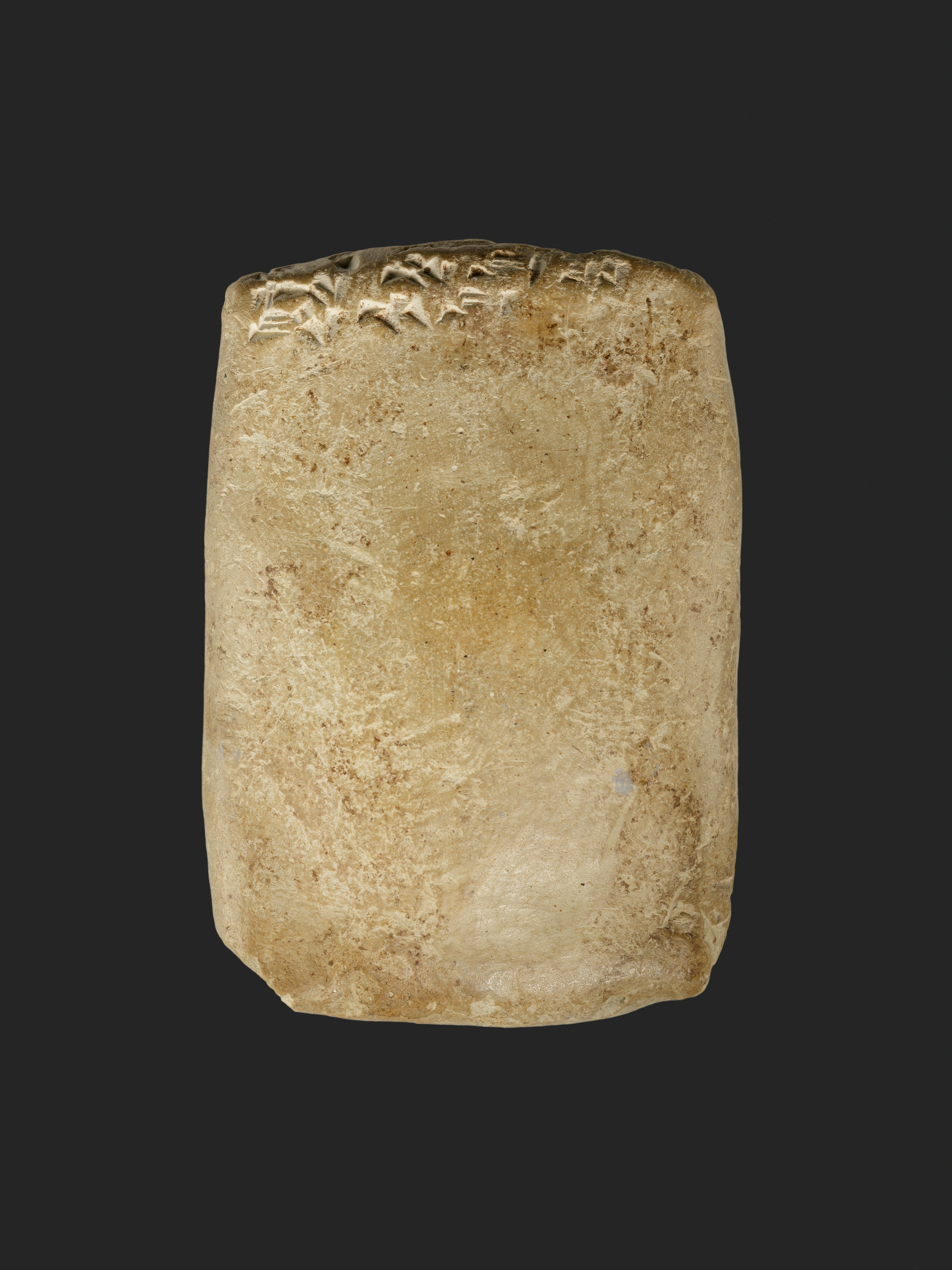

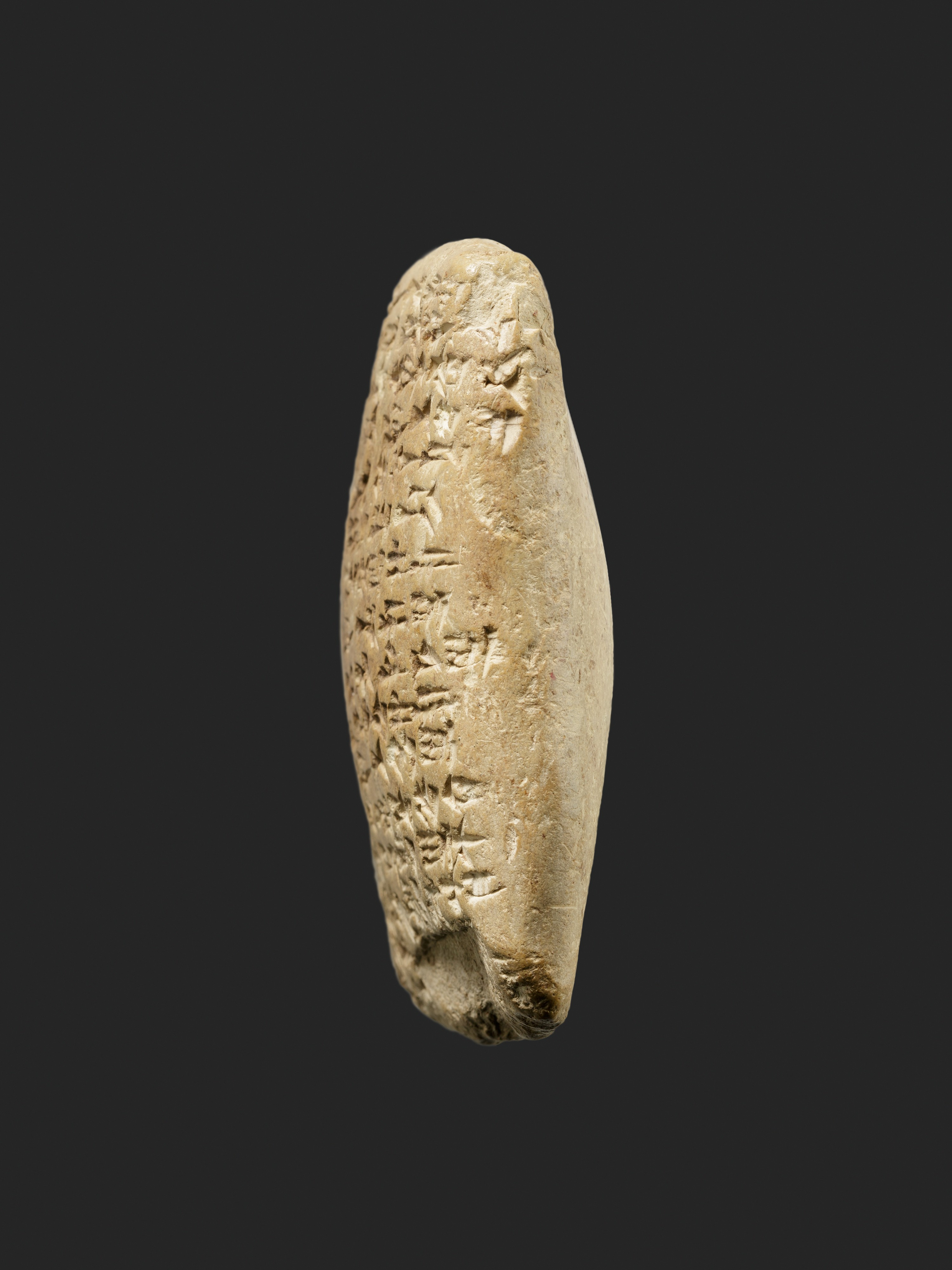

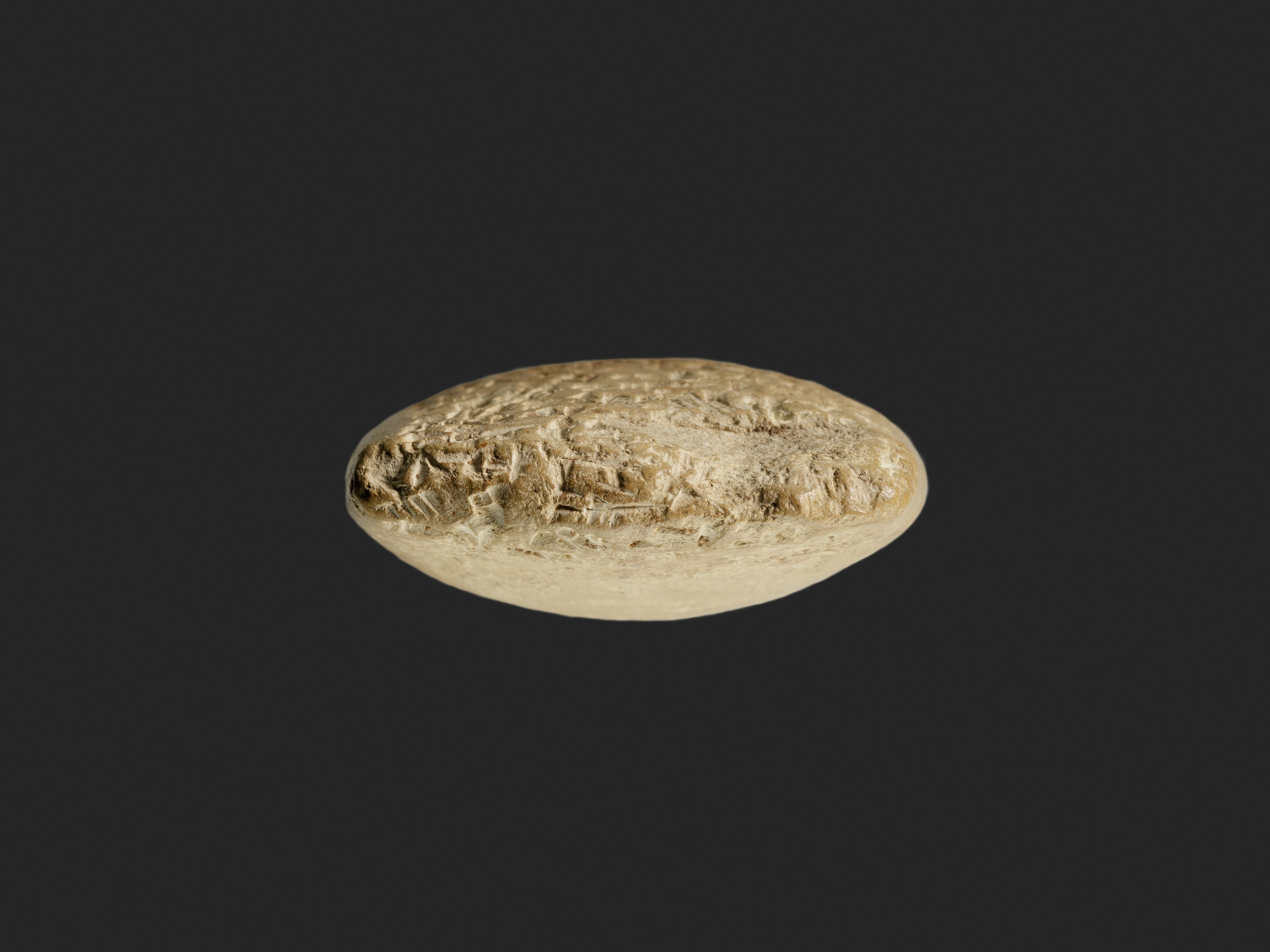
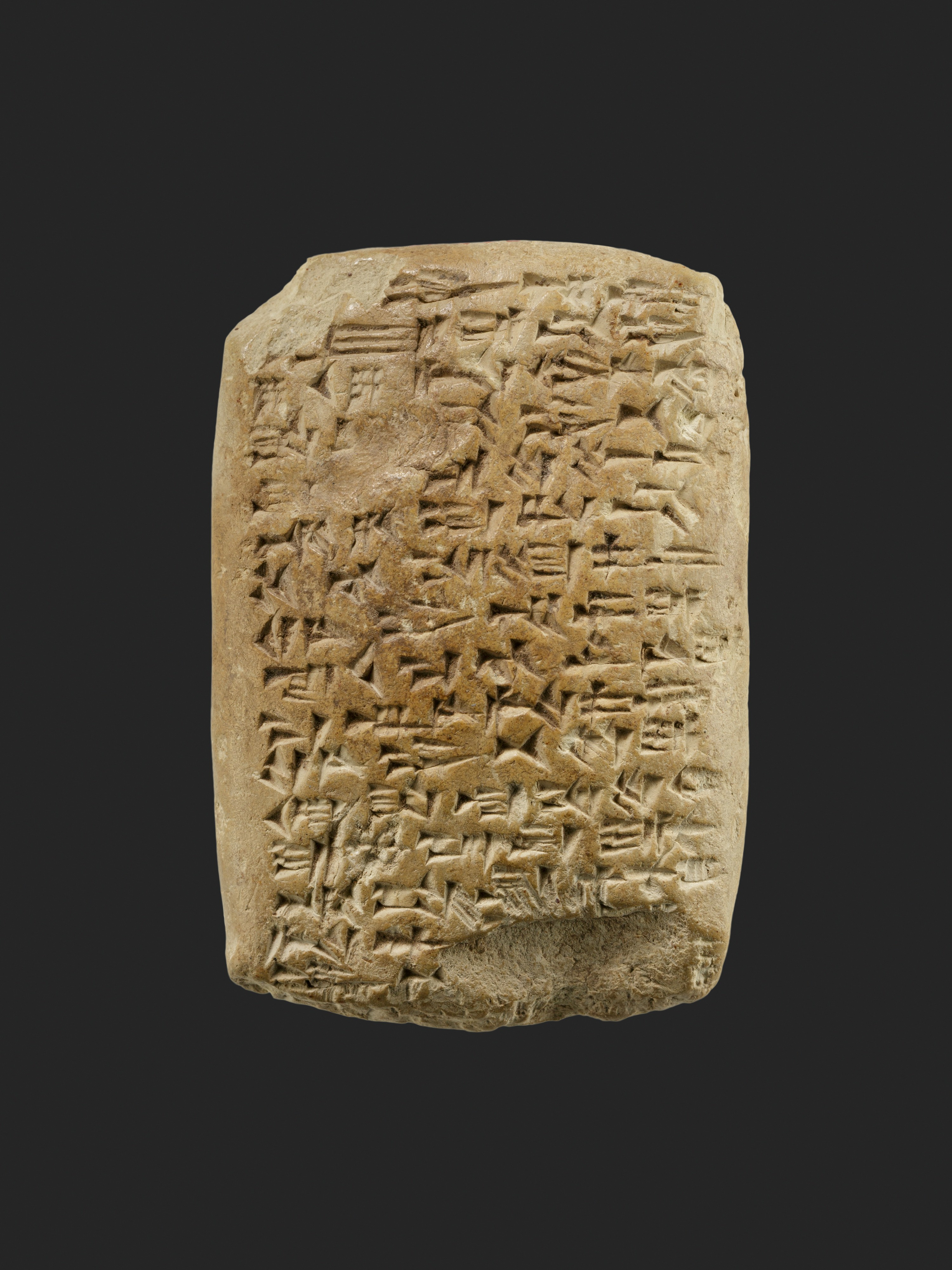

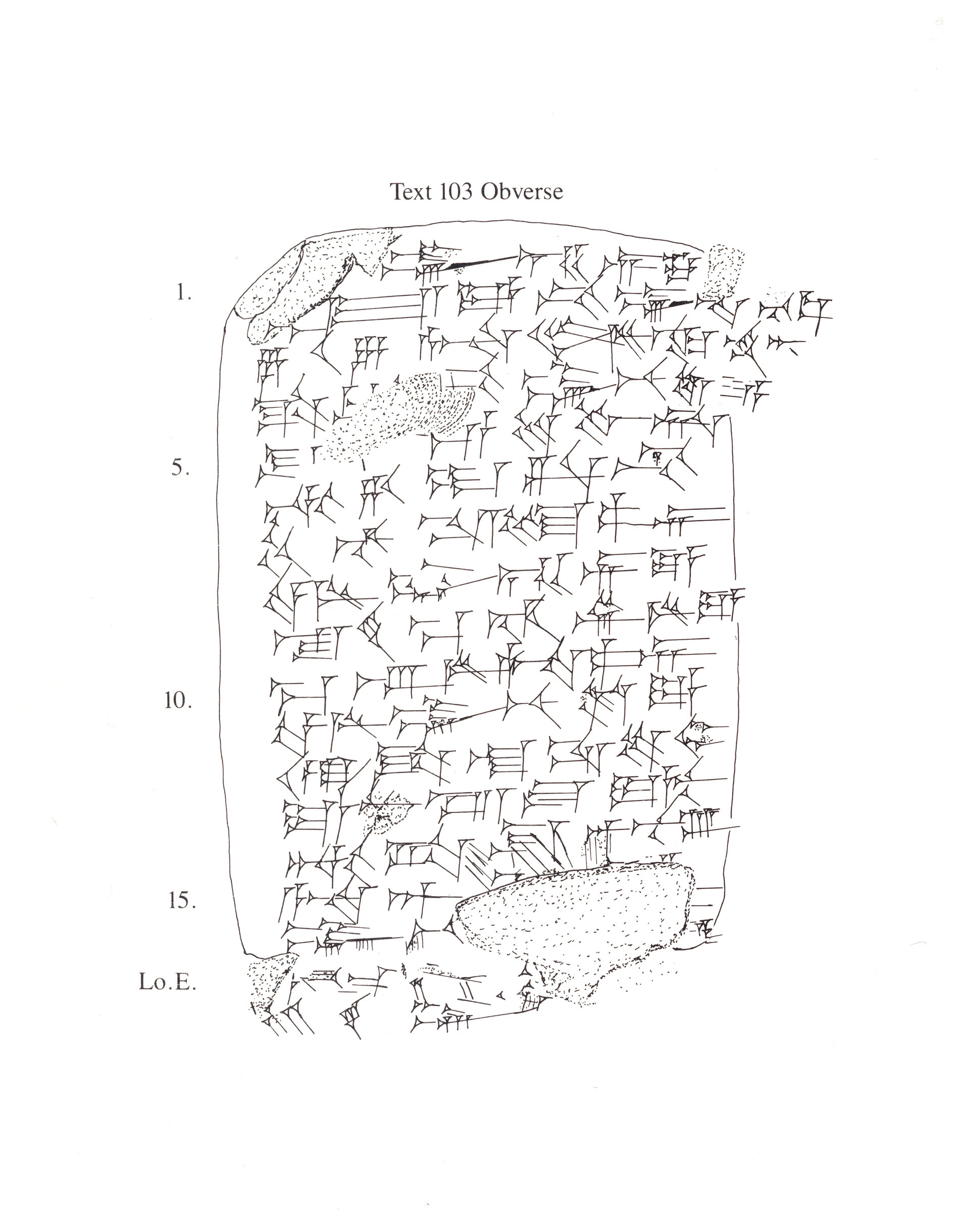
line drawing, Obverse

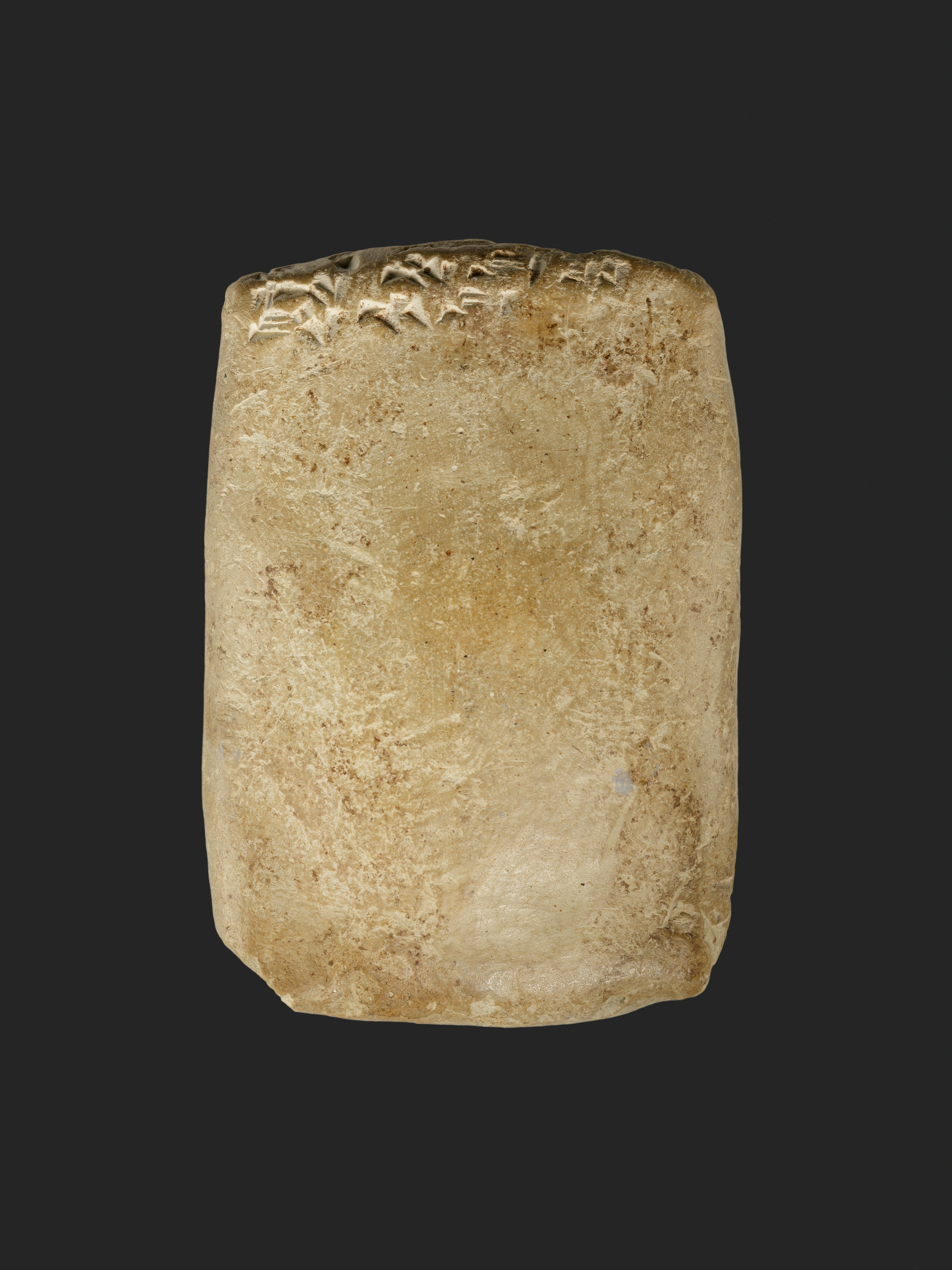

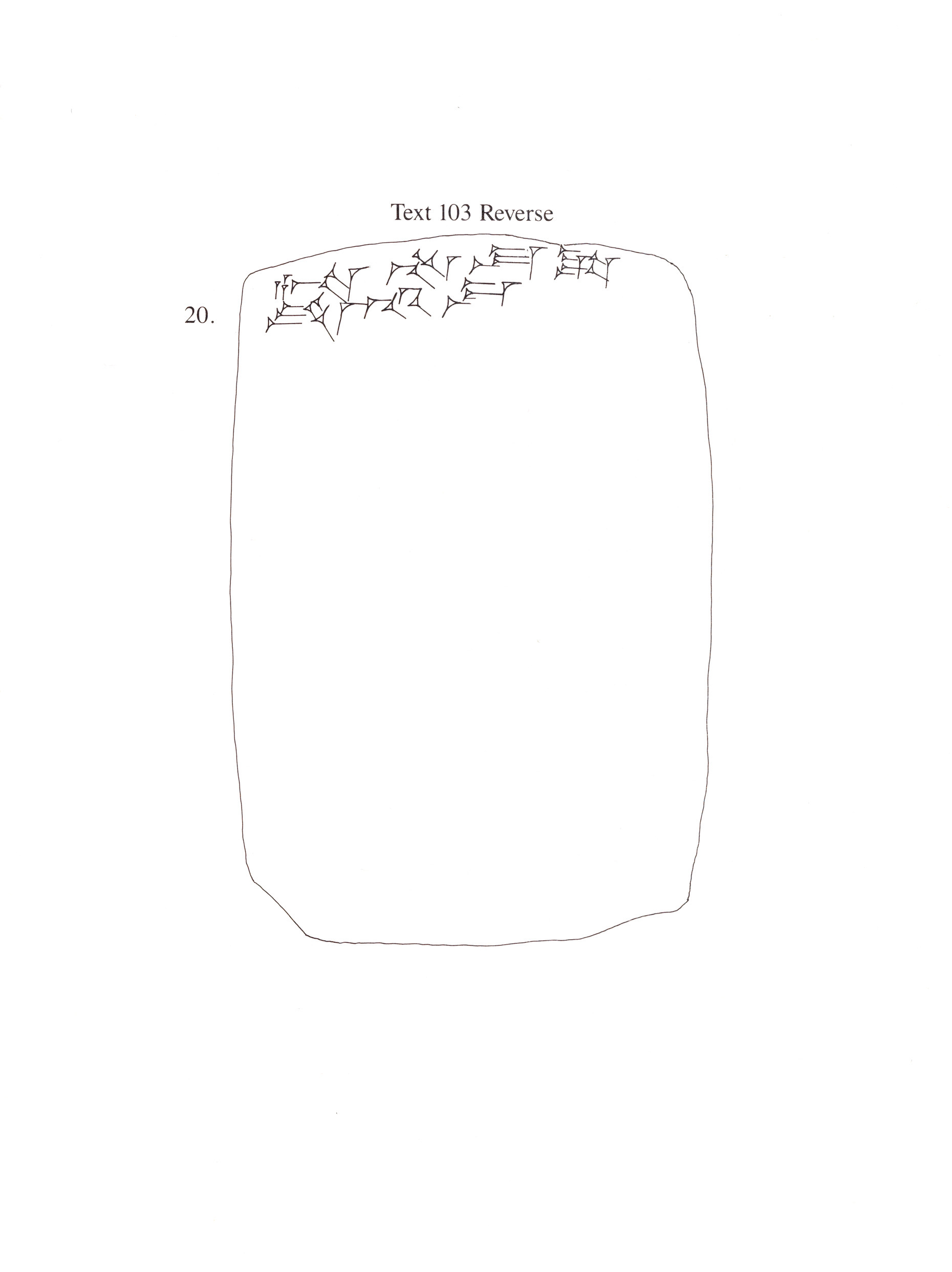
line drawing, Reverse
