= Amarna letter EA 27 =

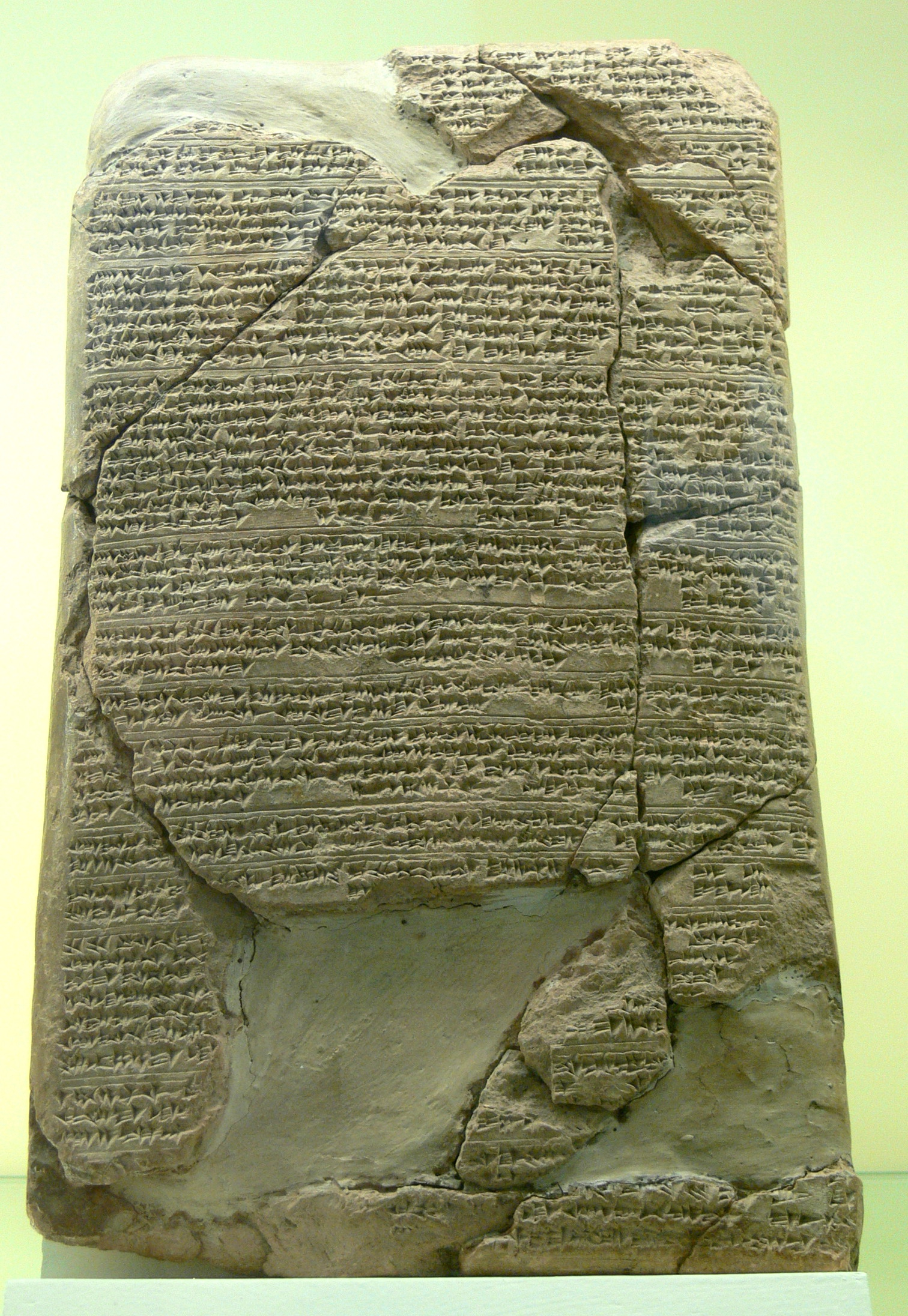
- Material: Clay
- Length: c. 21 cm
- Height: c. 21 cm
- Created: c. 1352 BC
- Language: Akkadian

Amarna letter EA 27 is a letter addressed to Amenhotep IV and concerns "The Missing Gold Statues Again".

The letter is dated to a period within the very beginning of the second regnal year of Amenhotep IV, and was written by Tushratta, who was living at Washukanni. At the time the pharaoh was located at Thebes.

The letter is thought to contain a reference to a royal funeral.

== See also ==
- List of Amarna letters by size
  - Amarna letter EA 5, EA 9, EA 15, EA 19, EA 26, EA 27, EA 35, EA 38
  - EA 153, EA 161, EA 288, EA 364, EA 365, EA 367
