= List of Amarna letters by size =

This is a List of Amarna letters by size, mostly length X width, and starting with the shortest (in Height). Note: a few Amarna letters are wider than tall, for example EA 290.

It should be understood the definition of "mayor" in the Amarna letters. (The definition of King is relatively obvious). Some mayors are called the "Man Town XXX". The obvious description is to call the mayor a governor, (the man who governs, no matter the size of the City-state; ("governor" means "govern-or"). The power of local governors depended on conflicts, or commercial local successes, or of course the discourses, including the everpresent Habiru, ('Apiru).

== Amarna letter EA 252 ==
Amarna letters by size (Height x Width) + (Thickness)
| Amarna letter | Region/Person | Length X Width | Images |
|---|---|---|---|
| EA 252 | letter of Mayor Labaya of Šakmu Schechem British Museum no. E 29844 | 6.985 centimetres (3 in); X ~5.71 centimetres (2 in) ((~2.75 in x ~2.25 in)) | Obverse EA 252, 2.75 in tall Obverse, Lines 1–15 (Bottom & Reverse), Lines 16-31 |

== Amarna letter EA 365 ==
Amarna letters by size (Height x Width) + (Thickness)
| Amarna letter | Region/Person | Length X Width | Images |
|---|---|---|---|
| EA 365 | letter of Mayor Biridiya of Megiddo Louvre AO 7098 | 6.5 centimetres (3 in); X ~6.5 centimetres (3 in) | Obverse EA 365, 6.5 cm tall Obverse, Lines 1–14 (Reverse & Left Side), Lines 15-31 |

== Amarna letter EA 15 ==
Amarna letters by size (Height x Width) + (Thickness)
| Amarna letter | Region/Person | Length X Width | Images |
|---|---|---|---|
| EA 15 | letter of Ashur-uballit I of Assyria Metropolitan Museum of Art; 24.2.11 | 7.7 centimetres (3 in); X 5.5 centimetres (2 in) | Obverse EA 15, 7.7 cm tall Obverse, Lines 1–15 (Bottom Edge & Reverse), Lines 16-22 |

== Amarna letter EA 153 ==
Amarna letters by size (Height x Width) + (Thickness)
| Amarna letter | Region/Person | Length X Width | Images |
|---|---|---|---|
| EA 153 | letter from Abimilku of (island) Tyre Metropolitan Museum 24.2.12 | 7.78 centimetres (3 in); X 5.24 centimetres (2 in) Note: Cuneiform characters on letter are very "stubbiform" (non-classical) | Obverse EA 153, 7.78 cm tall Obverse, Lines 1–16 (Bottom Edge & Reverse), Lines 17-20 |

== Amarna letter EA 367 ==
Amarna letters by size (Height x Width) + (Thickness)
| Amarna letter | Region/Person | Length X Width | Images |
|---|---|---|---|
| EA 367 | letter by Pharaoh to Endaruta of Achshaph (Akšapa) Louvre AO 7095 | 3.2 in (8.2 cm) X 2.2 in (5.8 cm) | Obverse EA 367, 11.43 cm tall Obverse, Lines 1–16 (Reverse), Lines 17-25 |

== Amarna letter EA 364 ==
Amarna letters by size (Height x Width) + (Thickness)
| Amarna letter | Region/Person | Length X Width | Images |
|---|---|---|---|
| EA 364 | Mayor Ayyab letter Louvre AO 7094 | 4.0 inches (10 cm); X 2.3 inches (6 cm) | Obverse EA 364, 10 cm tall |

== Amarna letter EA 9 ==
Amarna letters by size (Height x Width) + (Thickness)
| Amarna letter | Region/Person | Length X Width | Images |
|---|---|---|---|
| EA 9 | letter of Burna-Buriash II of Karduniaš (Babylon) British Museum E 29795 | 11.3 centimetres (4 in); X 8.1 centimetres (3 in) | Reverse EA 9, 11.3 cm tall (Reverse), Lines 25–38 ((Obverse)), Lines 1-24 |

== Amarna letter EA 161 ==
Amarna letters by size (Height x Width) + (Thickness)
| Amarna letter | Region/Person | Length X Width | Images |
|---|---|---|---|
| EA 161 | letter from Aziru to Pharaoh British Museum E 29818 | ~12.0 cm (4.72 in); X ~8.33 cm (3.28 in) | Obverse EA 161, ~12.0 cm tall Obverse, Lines 1-26 (Reverse & Left), Lines 27-56 |

== Amarna letter EA 38 ==
Amarna letters by size (Height x Width) + (Thickness)
| Amarna letter | Region/Person | Length X Width | Images |
|---|---|---|---|
| EA 38 | letter from (unnamed) King of Alashiya Vorderasiatisches; Berlin Museum VAT 153 | 13.2 centimetres (5 in); X 10.0 centimetres (4 in) | Obverse EA 38, 13.2 cm tall Obverse, Lines 1-25 (Botton Edge & Reverse), Lines 26-30 |

== Amarna letter EA 5 ==
Amarna letters by size (Height x Width) + (Thickness)
| Amarna letter | Region/Person | Length X Width | Images |
|---|---|---|---|
| EA 5 | letter from King Kadashman-Enlil I of Babylon (Kardunias) to Pharaoh British Museum 29787 | 14.0 centimetres (6 in); X 7.0 centimetres (3 in) | Obverse EA 5, 14 cm tall Obverse, Lines 1-33 |

== Amarna letter EA 35 ==
Amarna letters by size (Height x Width) + (Thickness)
| Amarna letter | Region/Person | Length X Width | Images |
|---|---|---|---|
| EA 35 | letter from King of Alashiya British Museum E 29788 | 14.61 centimetres (6 in); X 9.84 centimetres (4 in) | Obverse EA 35, 6 in tall Obverse |

== Amarna letter EA 26 ==
Amarna letters by size (Height x Width) + (Thickness)
| Amarna letter | Region/Person | Length X Width | Images |
|---|---|---|---|
| EA 26 | letter of Tushratta to Tiye, the Great Royal Wife of Egypt. British Museum E 29794 (Full tablet view: Photo, EA 26: Obverse) | ~14.7 centimetres (6 in); X ~9.5 centimetres (4 in); X ~2.4 centimetres (1 in) | Obverse-(fragment) —(about 40 % of height, lower left corner fragment) EA 26, ~14.7 cm tall Obverse, Lines 1-39 Reverse Lines 40–66 (Full tablet view: Photo, EA 26: Obverse |

== Amarna letter EA 288 ==
Amarna letters by size (Height x Width) + (Thickness)
| Amarna letter | Region/Person | Length X Width | Images |
|---|---|---|---|
| EA 288 | letter from Abdi-Heba of Jerusalem (Uru-Salem)(City-Peace) Vorderasiatisches; Berlin Museum VAT 1643 | 16.2 centimetres (6 in); 16.45 (for line 16 broken gap adjustment) X 10.5 centimetres (4 in) | Obverse EA 288, 16.45 cm tall Obverse, Lines 1-31 (Reverse), Lines 32-66 |

== Amarna letter EA 19 ==
Amarna letters by size (Height x Width) + (Thickness)
| Amarna letter | Region/Person | Length X Width | Images |
|---|---|---|---|
| EA 19 | letter of Tushratta of Mitanni British Museum E 29791 | 19.4 centimetres (8 in); X 9.7 centimetres (4 in) | Obverse EA 19, 19.4 cm tall Obverse, Lines 1-42 (Reverse), Lines 43-85 |

== Amarna letter EA 27 ==
Amarna letters by size (Height x Width) + (Thickness)
| Amarna letter | Region/Person | Length X Width | Images |
|---|---|---|---|
| EA 27 | letter from Tushratta of Mitanni Vorderasiatisches; Berlin Museum VAT 2333 | ~~21.0 centimetres (8 in); X ~~12.0 centimetres (5 in) | Obverse EA 27, ~21.0 cm tall Obverse, Lines 1-58 (Reverse), Lines 59-113 |

== See also ==
- Amarna letters
- British Museum
- Louvre
- Vorderasiatisches Museum Berlin
- Metropolitan Museum of Art
