= Amarna letter EA 19 =

14th-century BCE Egyptian clay tablet

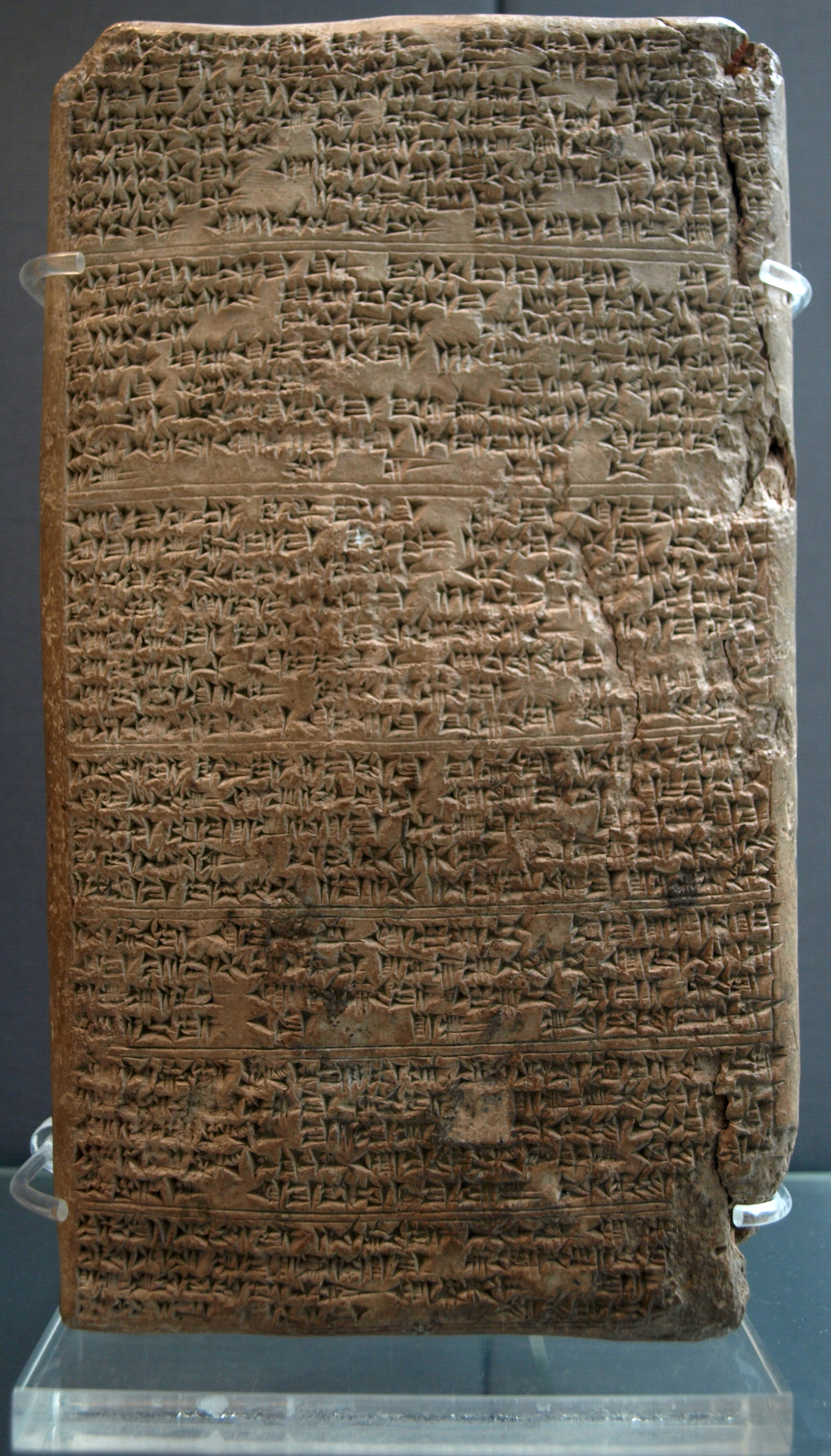
- EA 19. Tushratta to Pharaoh, mid-1300s BC. Lines, obverse, 1–41 (of 85).
- Material: Clay
- Created: c. 1386 BC
- Discovered: Minya, Egypt
- Present location: London, England, United Kingdom

Amarna letter EA 19 is a tall clay tablet letter of 13 paragraphs, in relatively pristine condition, with some minor flaws on the clay, but a complete enough story that some included words can complete the story of the letter. Entitled "Love and Gold", the letter is about gold from Egypt (gold mine production), love between father-king ancestors and the current relationship between the King of Mitanni and the Pharaoh of Misri (Egypt), and marriage of women from King Tushratta of Mitanni to the Pharaoh of Egypt.

Besides the Double Line Ruling, for paragraphing (7 paragraphs on obverse), an overwritten Single Line Rule is at clay tablet left margin, as well as cuneiform characters inscribed upon a vertical right margin line of Single Line Rule. (see left margin here: )

The Amarna letters, about 300, numbered up to EA 382, are a mid 14th century BC, around 1386 BC and 45 years later, correspondence. The initial corpus of letters were found at Akhenaten's city Akhetaten, in the floor of the Bureau of Correspondence of Pharaoh; others were later found, adding to the body of letters.

== The letter ==
=== EA 19: Love and gold ===
Letter three of thirteen between Tushratta and the Pharaoh of Egypt (named Misri in the letters). (Obverse only, Paragraphs I–VII):

(Para I, 1–8)–Say to Nimmureya, Great King, the king of Egypt (Misri), [my] brother, my son-in-law, who loves me, and whom I lov[e]: Message of Tushratta, Great King, [your] father-in-law, who loves you, the king of Mitanni, your brother. For me all goes well. For you may all go well. For your household, for my sister, for the rest of your wives, for your sons, for your chariots, for your horses, for your warriors, for your country, and for whatever else belongs to you, may all go "very, very well"-("dan-is, dan-is").
(Para II, 9–16)–As far back as the time of your ancestors, they always showed love to my ancestors. You yourself went even further and showed very great love to my father. Now, in keeping with our constant and mutual love, you have made it ten times-(Akkadian: a-na 10 šu—"for ten times") greater than the love shown my father. May the gods grant it, and may Tessup, my lord, and Aman and Tessup, my lord, and Aman make flour[ish] for evermore, just as it is now, this mutual love of ours.
(Para III, 17–24)–When my brother sent Mane, his messenger, saying, ("um-ma")-"Send your daughter here to be my wife and the mistress of Egypt," I caused my brother no distress and immediately I said, ("um-ma")-"Of course!" The one whom my brother requested I showed to Mane, and he saw her. When he saw her, he praised her greatly. I will l[ea]d her in safety to my brother's country. May Shaushka and Aman make her the image of my brother's desire.
(Para IV, 25–29)–Keliya, my messenger, brou[ght] my brother's words to me, and when I heard (them), they were very pleasing, and I rejoiced very, very much, saying, ("um-ma")-"'Certainly' there is this between us: we love each other.-(?!)" Now, with such words let us love (each other) forevermore.
(Para V, 30–33)–When I wrote to my brother, I said, ("um-ma")-"Let us love (each other) very, very much, and between us let there be friendship." I also said to my brother, ("um-ma")-"May my brother treat me ten times better than he did my father."
(Para VI, 34–38)–I also asked my brother for much gold-(KU3-SIG17.MEŠ), saying: ("um-ma")-"May my brother grant me more than he did by father and send it to me. You sent my father much gold. You sent him large gold jars and gold jugs. You se[nt him] gold bricks as if they 'were (just) the equivalent of' copper."
(Para VII, 39–42)–When I sent Keliya to my brother, I asked for [much] gold saying, ("um-ma")-"May my brother treat me [ten times] better than he did my father, and may he send much gold that has not been worked." –EA 19, Obverse, lines 1–42, mostly complete (minor lacunae, restored)

== Gold, Akkadian language hurāṣu ==
In letter EA 19, 'gold' is referenced 21 times. It is used in connection with other gift names in the closing paragraph, P. XIII, as examples: '1 gold goblet', and '19 pieces of gold, its centerpiece being of genuine lapis lazuli set in gold.' The entire list contains ten items, ending with: '10 teams of horses; 10 wooden chariots along with everything belonging to them; and 30 women (and) men.'

The first mention of 'gold', Akkadian hurāṣu, occurs on the obverse, EA 9 (photo above), in paragraphs VI and VII. Unlike EA 9 (from Burna-Buriash II of Babylon) which just uses the sumerogram KUG.GI for 'gold' (sumerogram KUG.GI = hurāṣu), EA 19 uses the plural form in some of the cuneiform signs. For lines 34, 37, Para VI, and line 41, Para VII the form is KUG.GI.MEŠ. Of note KUG is used infrequently in the Amarna letters (Buccellati, 1979). GI, or gi is used more commonly (probably mostly as a syllabic) in the Amarna letters (Buccellati, 143 times) An example of its Amarna letter usage is a letter from Jerusalem, stating intrigues of people and surrounding cities. It is used in Jerusalem letter Amarna letter EA 289, titled A Reckoning Demanded, for the name of Tagi (Ta-gi, first usage tablet obverse, line 11).

== See also ==
- Amarna letters–phrases and quotations
- List of Amarna letters by size
  - Amarna letter EA 5, EA 9, EA 15, EA 19, EA 26, EA 27, EA 35, EA 38
  - EA 153, EA 161, EA 288, EA 364, EA 365, EA 367

== Photo links, including EA 19 ==
- British Museum image gallery for E29791, EA 19

=== Amarna letters (photos) ===
King of Babylon:

- EA 9-(Obverse); see: Karaduniyaš

Tushratta:

- EA 19-(Obverse), Article, Tushratta
- EA 23-(Reverse), with Black Hieratic; Article-(British Museum); see: Shaushka
- EA 28-(Obverse), see: Pirissi and Tulubri

Alashiya letters

- EA 34-(Obverse) See: EA 34

Rib-Hadda letters:

- EA 126-(Obverse); Article-(Click for larger Picture); See: Salhi (region)
- #1: EA 153-(Obverse); Article
- #2: EA 153-(Obverse)-2nd; see: Abimilku

Abdi-Tirši:

- EA 228-(Obverse)//(228,330,299,245,252), (EA 330, for Šipti-Ba'lu); Article, Pic writeup

Biridiya:

- EA 245-(Obverse) EA 245-(Reverse); Article-1; Article-2; Hannathon/Hinnatuna

Labaya:

- EA 252-(Obverse), Article, see Labaya

Others:

- EA 299-(High Res.)(Obverse); see Yapahu
- EA 369-Front/Back-(Click on each); see: Milkilu

=== Letters ===
- Letter: EA 147
- EA 147-(Obverse); Article
- Letter: EA 153
- #1: EA 153-(Obverse); Article
- #2: EA 153-(Obverse)-2nd; Article

=== Articles ===
- Write-up of Letter EA 151, concerning Zimredda of Sidon-(Sea peoples, Abimilku letter)
