= Amarna letter EA 35 =

Clay tablet letter from the King of Alashiya to the King (Pharaoh) of Egypt

Amarna letter EA 35 (Titled The Hand of Nergal)
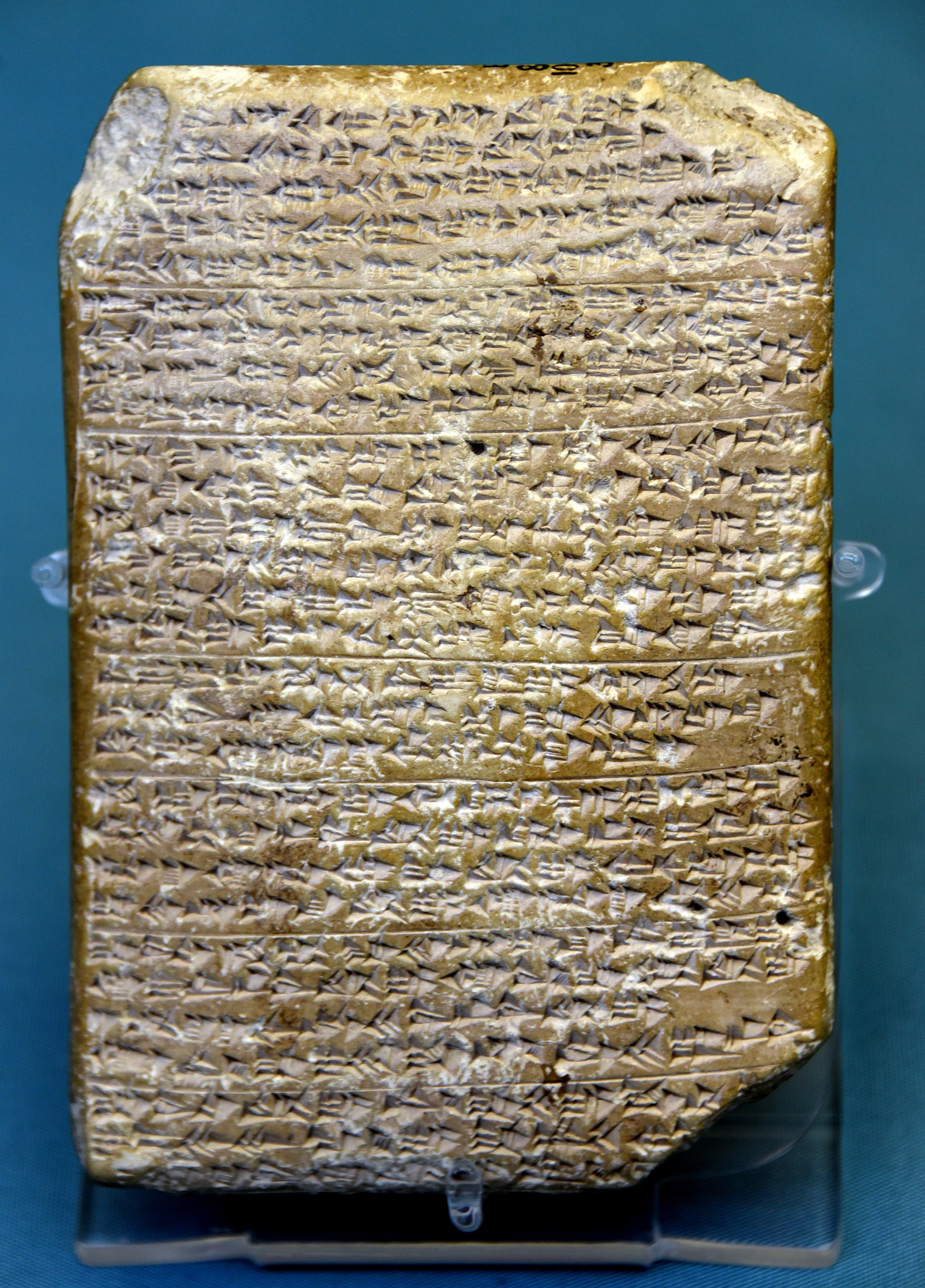
- EA 35, Obverse
- Material: Clay
- Size: Height: 5.75 in (14.6 cm); Width: 3.875 in (9.84 cm)
- Writing: Cuneiform (Akkadian language)
- Created: ~1375-1335 BC (Amarna Period)
- Period/culture: Middle Babylonian
- Place: Akhetaten
- Present location: British Museum, London; BM 29788 (E29788))

Amarna letter EA 35, titled The Hand of Nergal, is a moderate length clay tablet letter from the king of Alashiya (modern Cyprus) to the king (pharaoh) of Egypt (photo, high resolution ). The letter has multiple short paragraphs, with scribed, single-lines showing the paragraphing. Paragraphs I–VII are on the letter's obverse; paragraph VIII starts at the bottom edge and continues, ending at Paragraph XIII on the clay tablet's reverse.

The Amarna letters are a collection of about 300-382 letters diplomatic letters from the mid-14th century BC, around 1350 BC, and several letters from about twenty-five years later. The initial corpus of letters were found at Akhenaten's city, Akhetaten, in the floor of the Bureau of Correspondence of Pharaoh, and others were later found also adding to the body of letters.

This letter is located in the British Museum, no. 29788. The clay surface shows a gloss, implying a quality of the clay preparation. Small edges/ corners of the clay tablet letter are broken, damaged, or missing. The topics of the letter concern an epidemic afflicting the country; The Hand of Nergal, trade for silver, copper from Alašiya, and timber. The second half of the letter is a discussion of politics, concerning island individuals, and the two countries' messengers.

== EA 35, obverse ==
Moran's non-linear letter English language translation (translated from the French language):

(Lines 1–5) — S[ay to the k]ing of Egypt, my brother: [Message] of the king of Alašiya, your brother. [F]or me all goes well. For my household, my wives, my sons, my magnates, my horses, my chariots, and in my country, all goes very well. For my brother (Lines 6–9) — may all go well. For your household, your wives, your sons, your magnates, your horses, your chariots, and in your country, may all go very well. My brother, I herewith send my messenger with your messenger – to Egypt.
(10–15) — I herewith send to you 500 (talents) of copper. As my brother's greeting-gift, I send it to you. My brother, do not be concerned that the amount of copper is small. Behold, the Hand of Nergal is now in my country; he has slain all the men of my country, and there is not a (single) copper-worker. So, my brother, do not be concerned.
(16–18) — Send your messenger with my messenger immediately, and I will send you whatever copper you, my brother, request.
(19–22) — You are my brother. May he send me silver in very great quantities. My brother, give me the very best silver, and then I will send you, my brother, whatever you, my brother request.
(23–26) — Moreover (ša-ni-tam), my brother, give me the ox that my messenger requests, my brother, and send me, my brother, 2 kukkubu containers of "sweet oil", my brother, and send me one of the experts in vulture augury.
(27–29) — Moreover, my brother, men of my country, keep speaking with m[e] about my timber that the king of Egypt receives from me. My brother, [give me] the payment due. (obverse EA 35, lines 1–29, with minor lacunae)

== See also ==
- Alashiya
- Hittite plague
- Amarna letters–phrases and quotations
- List of Amarna letters by size
  - Amarna letter EA 5, EA 9, EA 15, EA 19, EA 26, EA 27, EA 35, EA 38
  - EA 153, EA 161, EA 288, EA 364, EA 365, EA 367
