= Amarna letter EA 38 =

Letter from the King of Alashiya, c.1350 BC

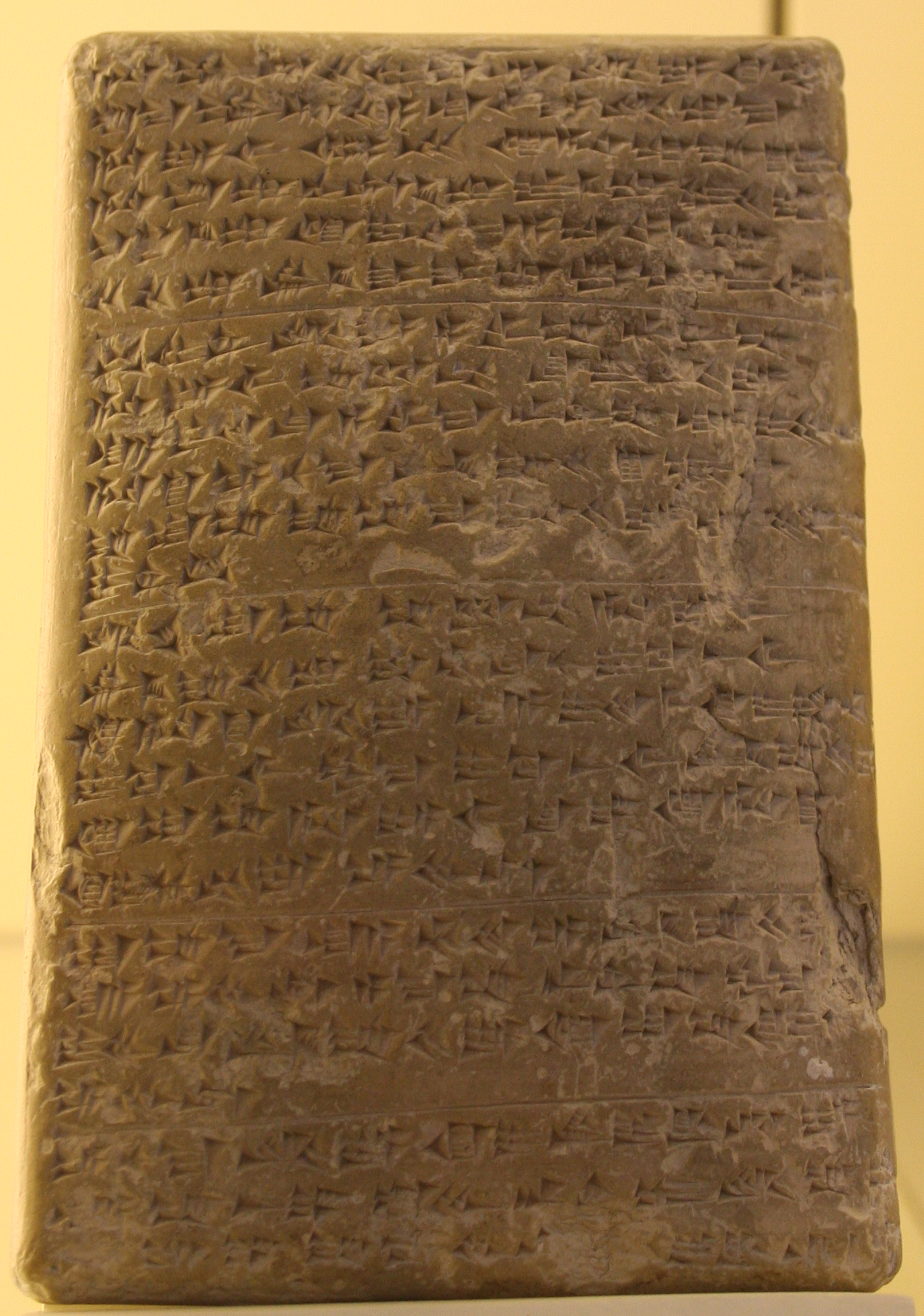
- Obverse of EA 38
- Material: Clay
- Created: c. 1350 BC
- Discovered: Minya, Egypt

Amarna letter EA 38, titled A Brotherly Quarrel, is a letter from the King of Alashiya (modern Cyprus). One identifier of many of the Amarna letters, is the use of paragraphing. Six paragraphs are in this letter, with much of the letter's reverse – uninscribed.

The Amarna letters, about 300, numbered up to EA 382, are a mid 14th century BC, about 1350 BC and 20–25 years later, correspondence. The initial corpus of letters were found at Akhenaten's city Akhetaten, in the floor of the Bureau of Correspondence of Pharaoh; others were later found, adding to the body of letters.

== The letter ==
=== EA 38: A Brotherly Quarrel ===
EA 38, letter number five of seven, from Alashiya. (Not a linear, line-by-line translation.)

Obverse

(Lines 1-6)–Say to the king of Egypt-(Mizri), my brother: Message of the king of Alashiya, your brother. For me all goes well, and for you may all go well. For your household, your chief wives,^{1} your sons, your horses, your chariots, among your numerous troops, in your country, among your magnates, may all go very well.

(7-12)–Why, my brother, do you say such a thing to me, "Does my brother not know this?" As far as I am concerned, I have done nothing of the sort. Indeed,^{2} men of Lukki, year by year, seize villages in my own country.

(13-18)–My brother, you say to me, "Men from your country were with them." My brother, I myself do not know that they were with them. If men from my country were (with them), send (them back) and I will act as I see fit.

(19-22)–You yourself do not know men from my country. They would not do such a thing.^{3} But if men from my country did do this, then you yourself do as you see fit.

(23-26)–Now, my brother, since you have not sent back my messenger, for this tablet it is the king's brother (as messenger). L[et] him write. Your messengers must tell me what I am to do.^{4}

bottom

(26)–"to do"^{4}

Reverse

(lines: 27-30)–Furthermore, which ancestors of yours did such a thin{g} to my ancestors: So no, my brother, do not be concerned. –(complete EA 38, with virtually no lacunae, lines 1-30)

== See also ==
- Amarna letters–phrases and quotations
- List of Amarna letters by size
  - Amarna letter EA 5, EA 9, EA 15, EA 19, EA 26, EA 27, EA 35, EA 38
  - EA 153, EA 161, EA 288, EA 364, EA 365, EA 367
