= Amarna letter EA 15 =

Assyrian clay tablet

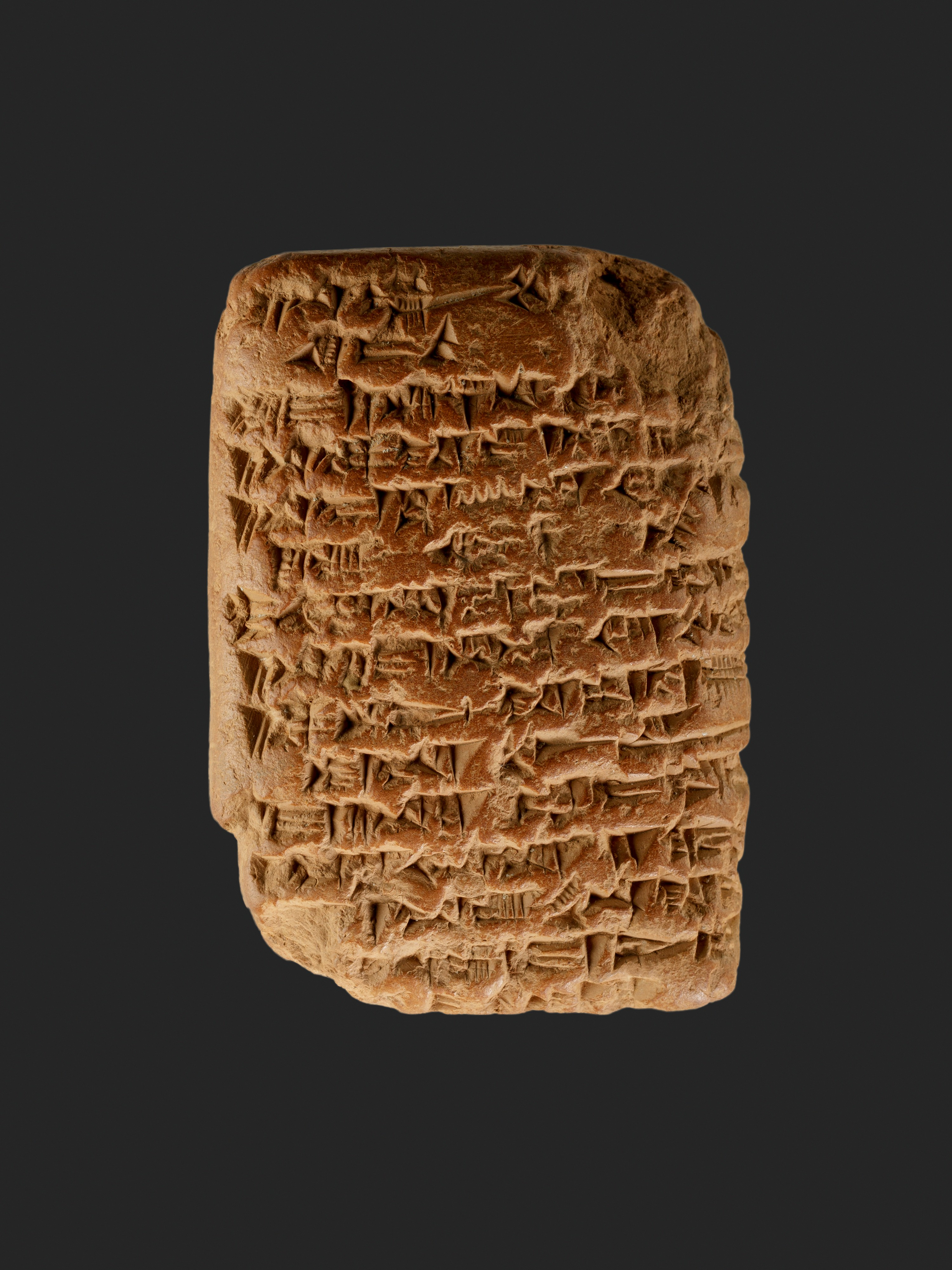
- Obverse of EA 15
- Material: Clay
- Created: c. 1350 BC
- Present location: New York City, New York, United States

Amarna letter EA 15, titled Assyria Joins the International Scene, is a shorter-length clay tablet Amarna letter from Ashur-uballit I of the Land of Assyria, (line 3 of EA 15). He addresses the Pharaoh in line 1, the "King (of) Land Miṣri-(Egypt)", thus the use of "Land (of) Assyria".

This short letter is synoptic with much information. It discusses the Assyrian messenger's reason for going to Egypt, "to see" the land, and report back to the Assyrian king. The letter speaks of a short history of not sending a messenger, or the two kingdoms talking, for some recent times. Besides the duties of the messenger to see, and report back, a list of "greeting gifts", shulmani, or "peace-gifts" are sent by Ashur-uballit I to the Pharaoh.

== The letter ==
=== EA 15: Assyria Joins the International Scene ===
EA 15, letter one of two from Assyria. (Not a linear, line-by-line translation.)

(Lines 1-6)--Say to the king of the land of E[gypt]: Thus Aššur-ubal[lit, the king of the land of (the god) A]ššur. For you, your household, for your land, your chariot-forces, your armies, may all be well.
(7-15)--I have sent my messenger to you to visit you and to visit your land. Up to now, my predecessors have not written; today, I have written to you. [I] send you a splendid chariot, 2 horses, and 1 date-stone of genuine lapis lazuli as your greeting gift (shulmani).
(16-22)--Do [no]t delay the messenger whom I have sent to you for a visit. He should visit and then leave for here. He should see what you are like and what your land is like, and then leave for here.--(complete, with minor lacunas, lines 1-22)

== Akkadian text ==
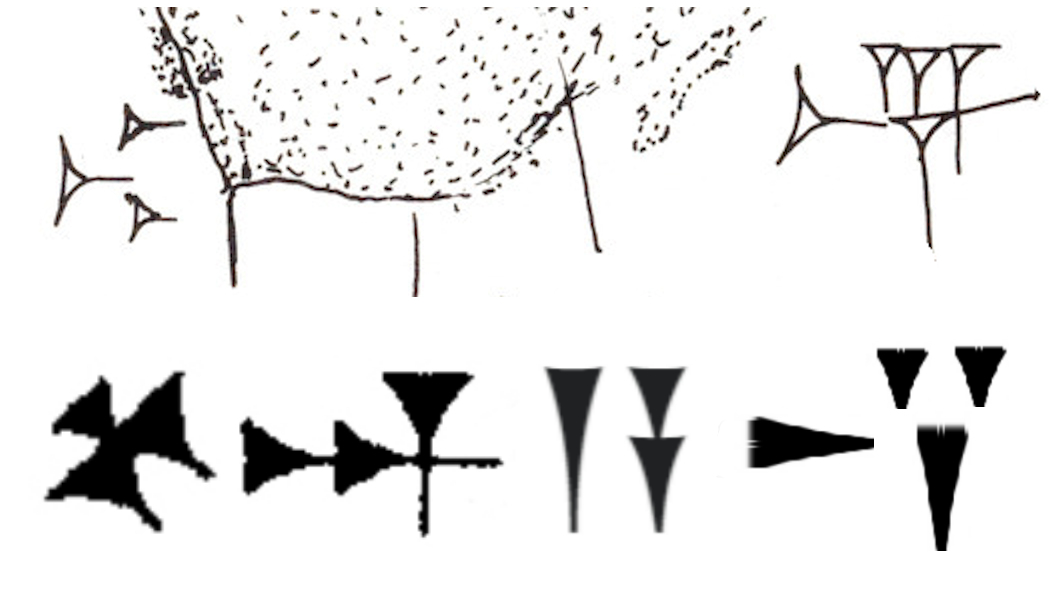
KUR ^{d}A-šur for "Land of Assyria" (with reconstitution) in Armana letter EA15. It was pronounced mat Ašur in Assyrian.

The Akkadian language text:

Akkadian:

Obverse:

(Line 1): A-na 1.^{diš}-LUGAL KUR Mi-iṣ-ri-
(2): qi-bi-[ ma ]
(3): umma ^{1.d}-A-šur-TI-L[A LUGAL KUR ^{d}A]-šur-ma
(4): ana ka-ša É-ka ana KUR-ka
(5): ana ^{giš}-GIGIR-MEŠ-ka ù ERIM-MEŠ-ka
(6): lu-ú šul-mu
segue:
(7): DUMU ši-ip-ri-ia al-tap-ra-ak-ku
(8): ana a-ma-ri-ka ù KUR-ka ana a-ma-ri
(9): adi an-ni-ša ab-ba-ú-ia
(10): lā iš-pu-ru
segue:
(11): u_{4}-ma a-na-ku al-tap-ra-ak-ku
(12): 1.-^{giš}-GIGIR SIG_{5}-ta 2.-ANŠE.KUR.RA.MEŠ
(13): [ ù ] ^{NA_{4}}-ú-hi-na ša ^{NA_{4}}-ZA.GÌN KUR-e
(14): [ a-n]a šul-ma-ni-ka
(15): [ ú ]-še-bi-la-[ ku ]

Lower Edge:

(16): [ DUMU ši- ]-ip-ri ša aš-pu-ra-ku-ni
(17): ana a-ma-ri

Reverse:

(18): [ l]ā tu_{4}-ka-[ as ]-sú
(19): [ l]i-mu-ur ù li-it-tal-ka
(20): [ ṭ]e-em-ka ù ṭe-em
(21): ma-ti-ka li-mur
(22): ù li-it-ta-al-ka

== See also ==
- Ashur-uballit I
- Ashur-uballit II
- Amarna letters–phrases and quotations
- List of Amarna letters by size
  - Amarna letter EA 5, EA 9, EA 15, EA 19, EA 26, EA 27, EA 35, EA 38
  - EA 153, EA 161, EA 288, EA 364, EA 365, EA 367

== Photo gallery of EA 15 ==
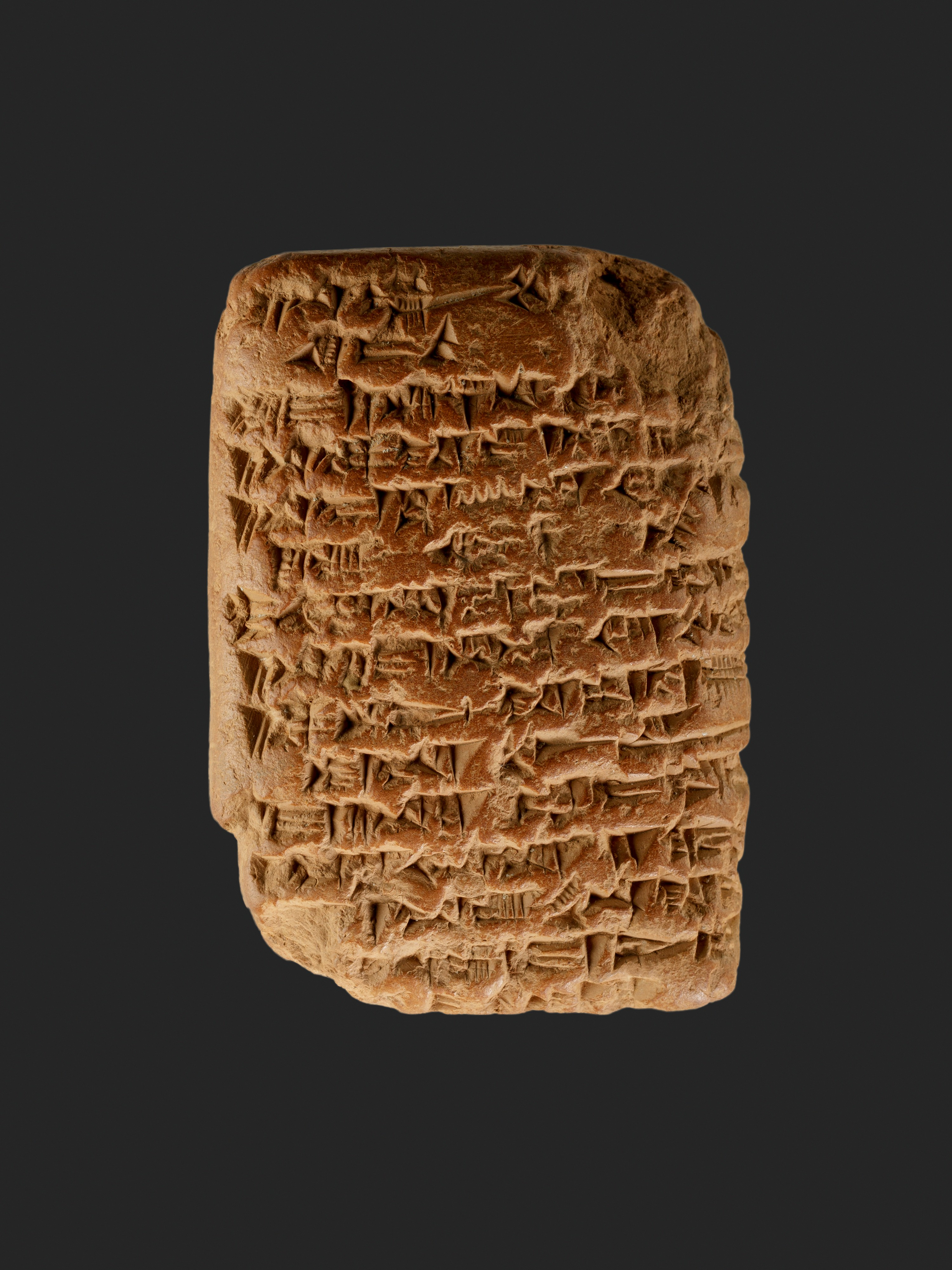

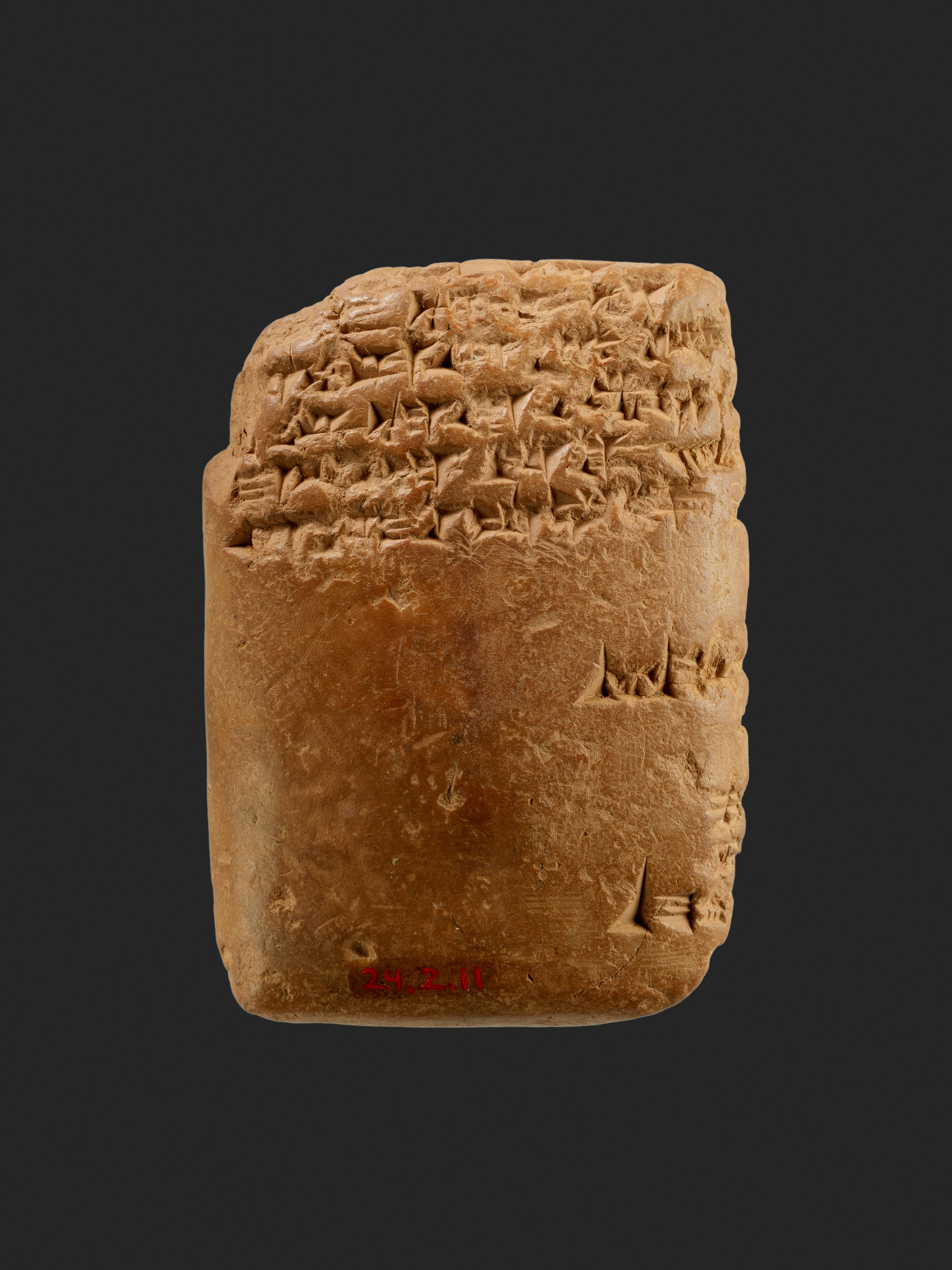

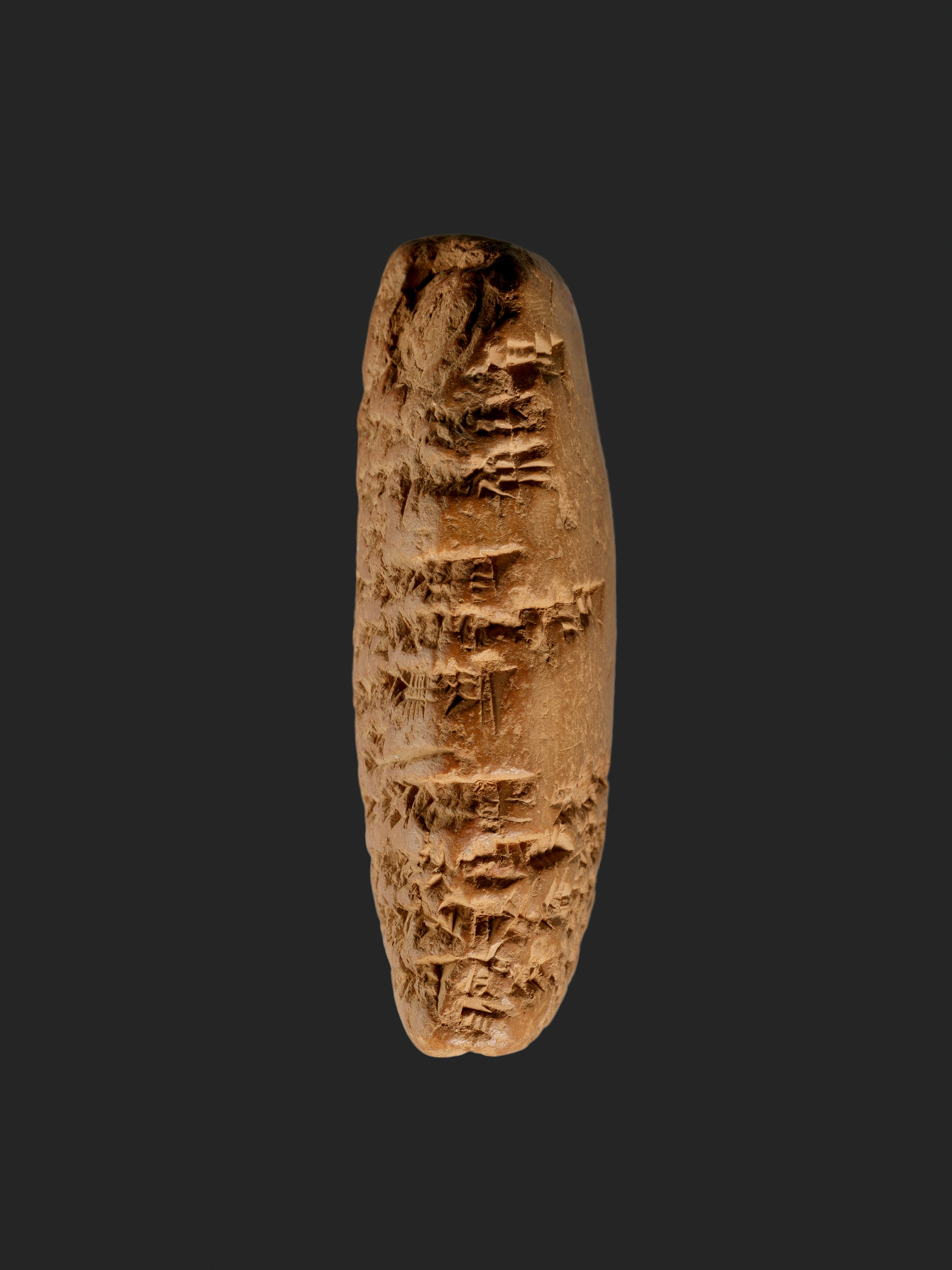

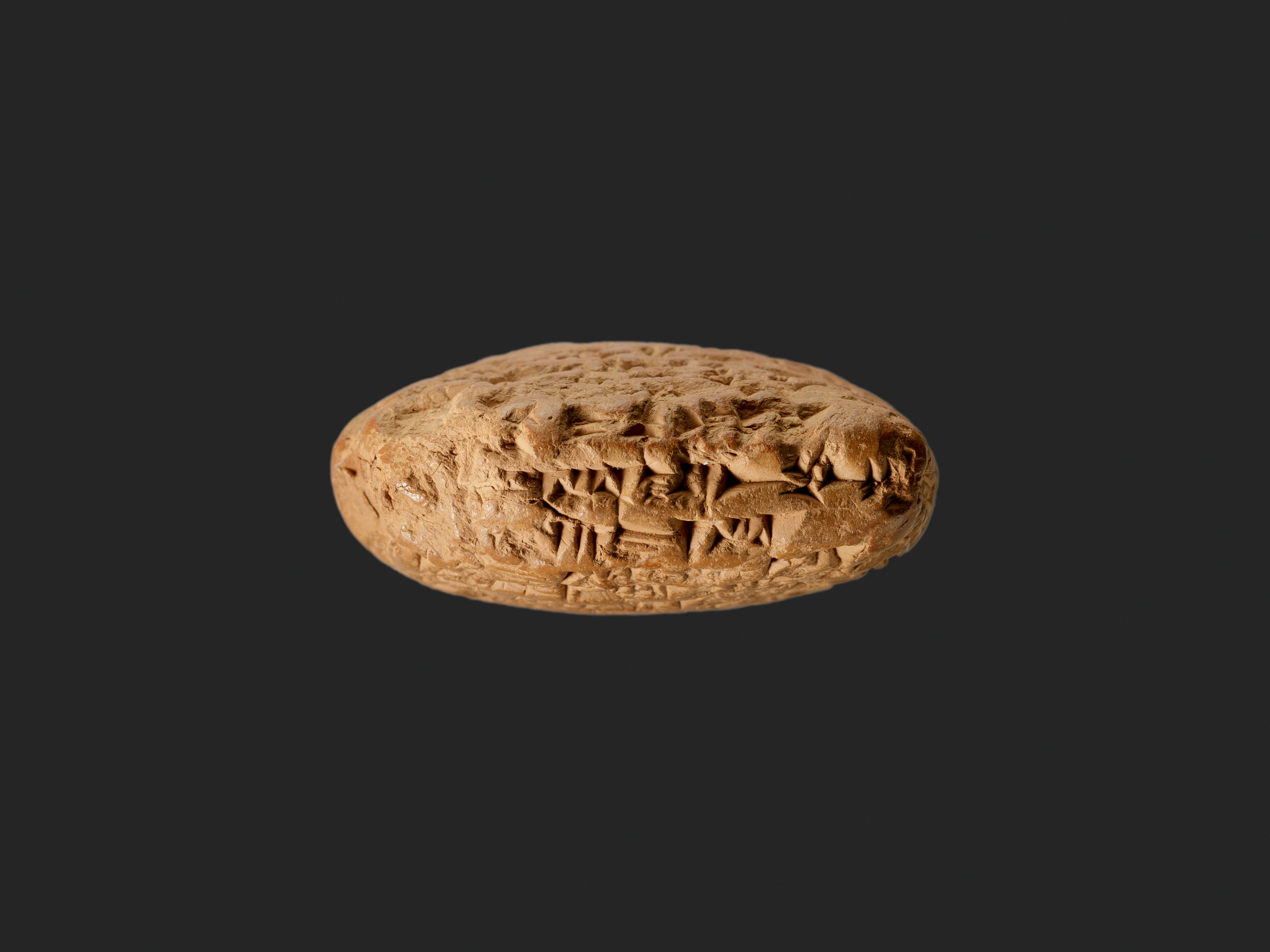
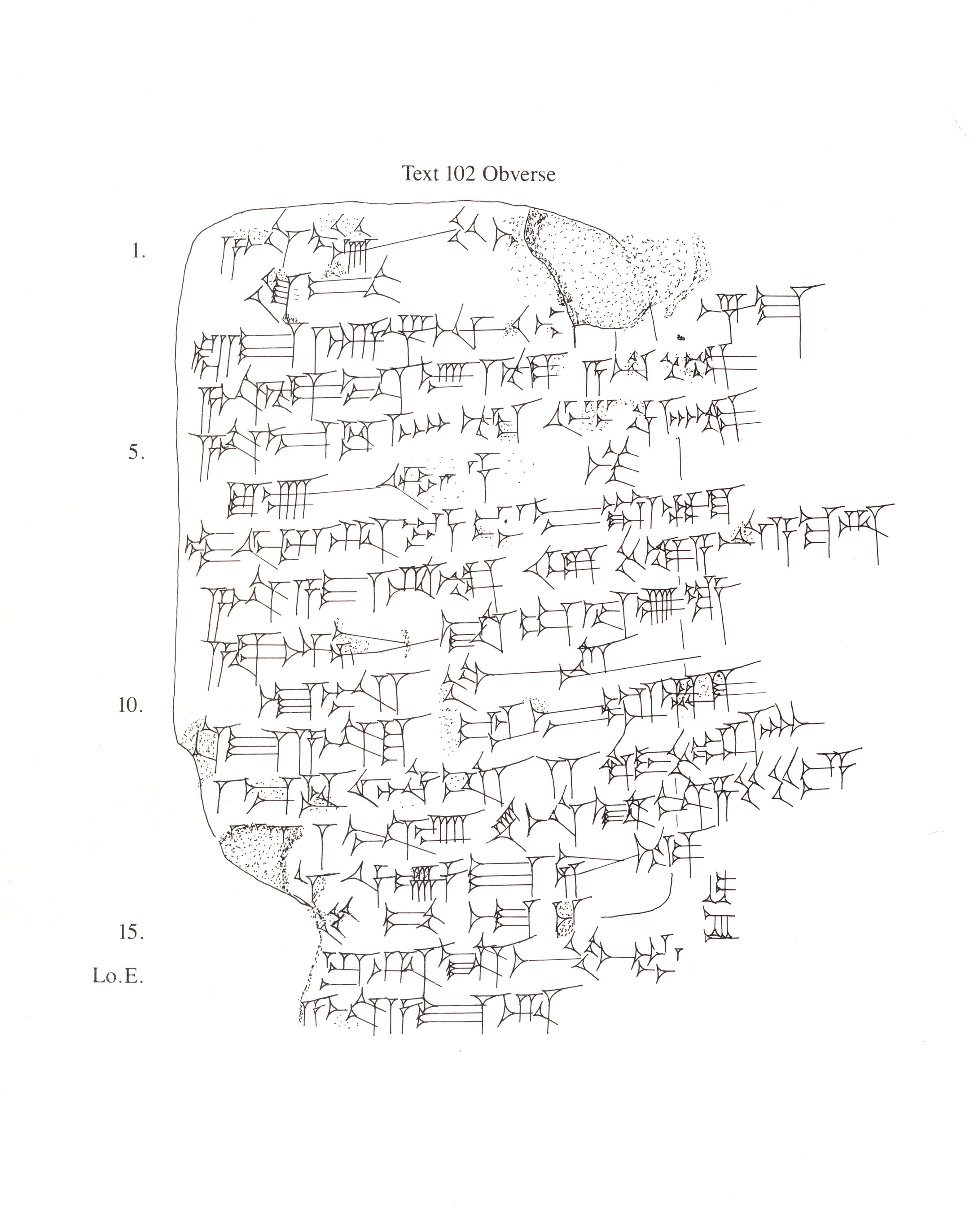
line drawing, Obverse

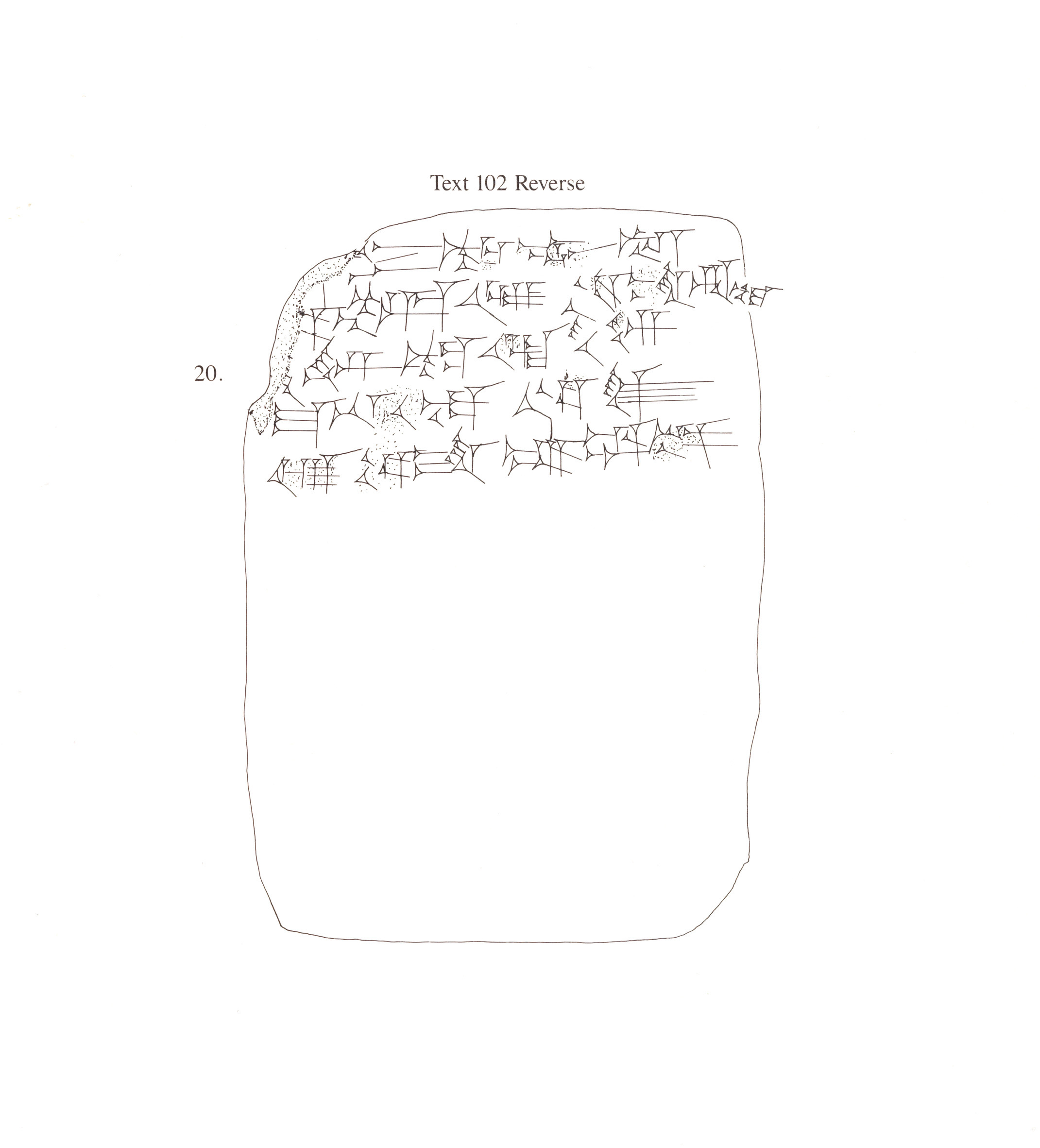
line drawing, Reverse

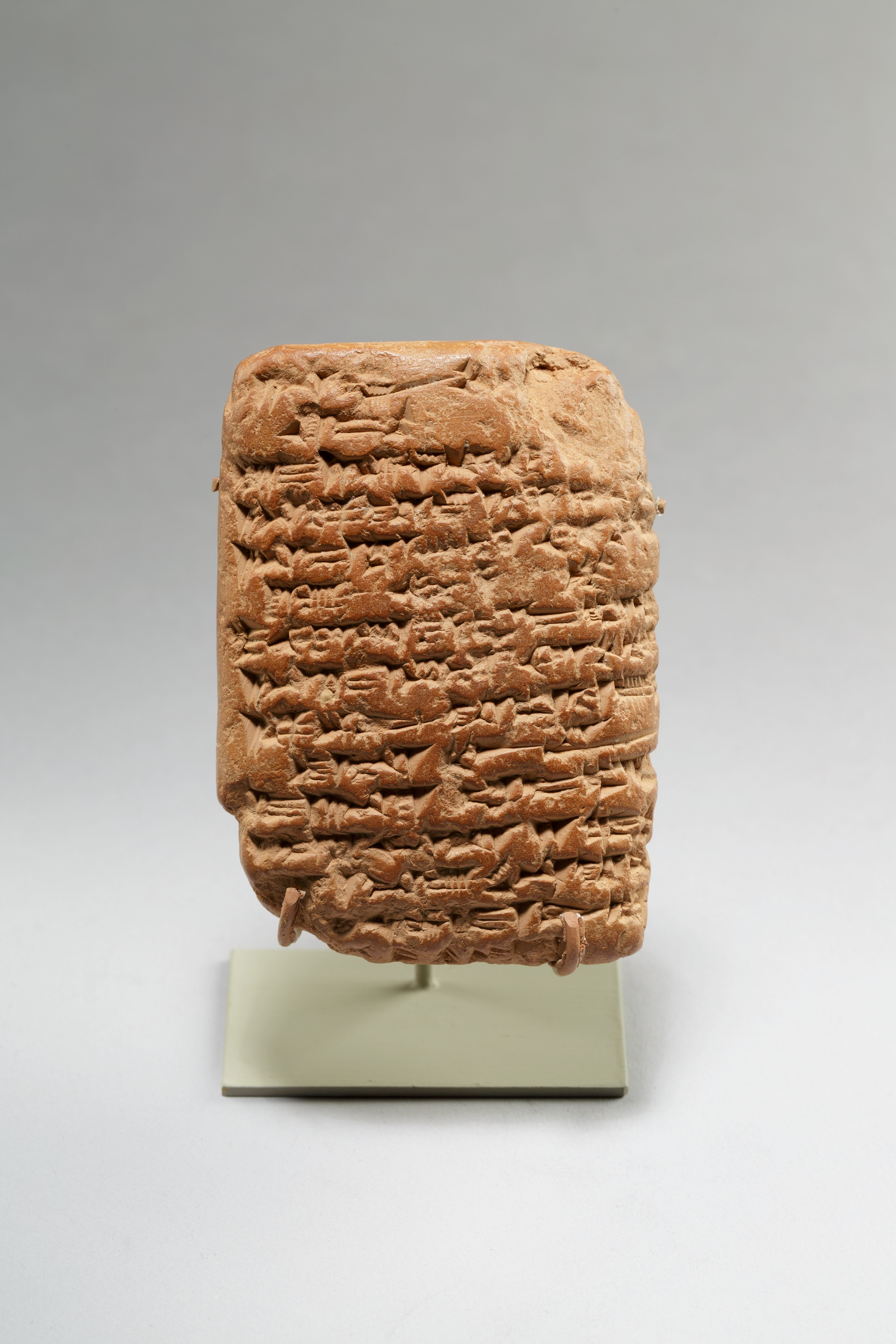
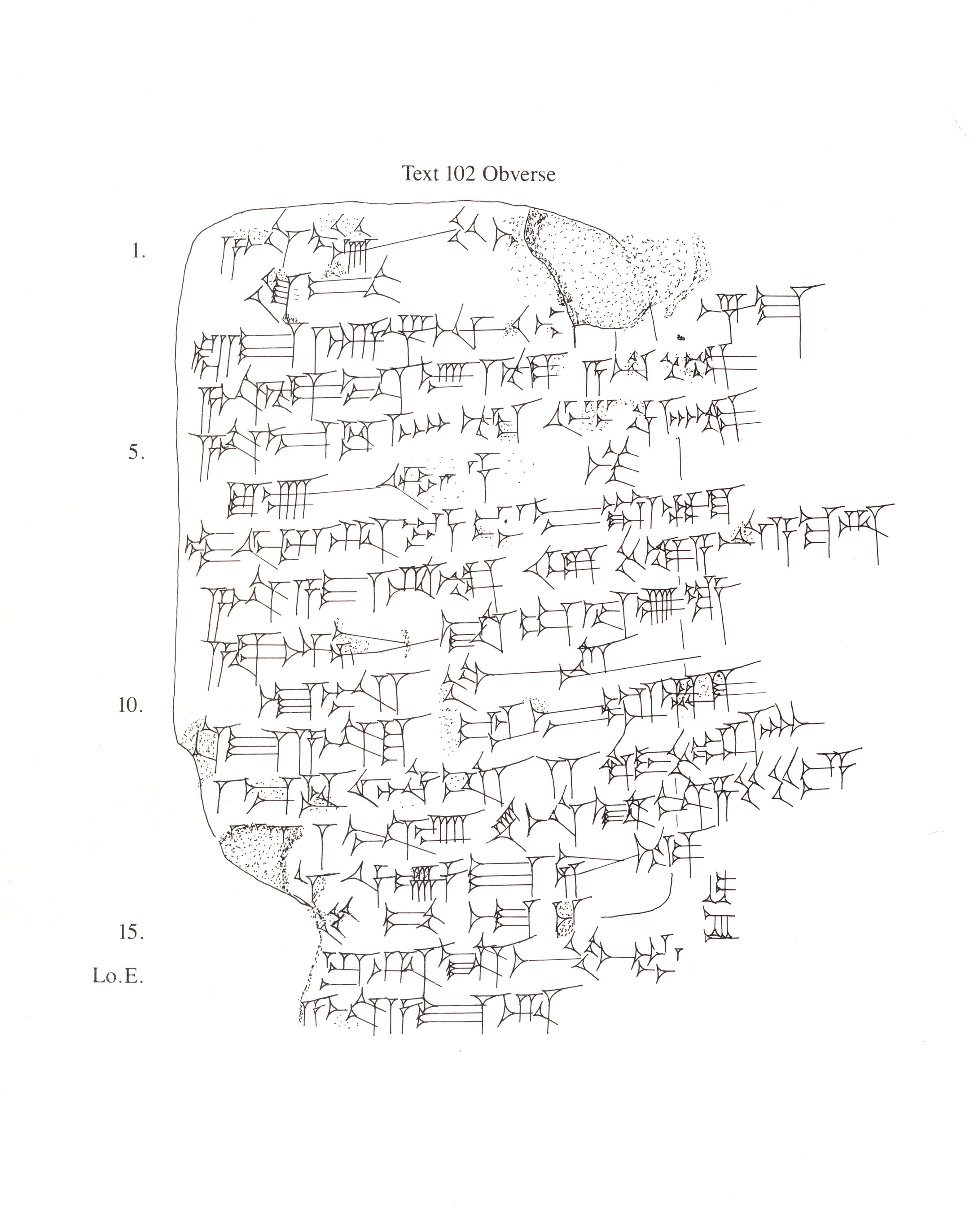
line drawing, Obverse

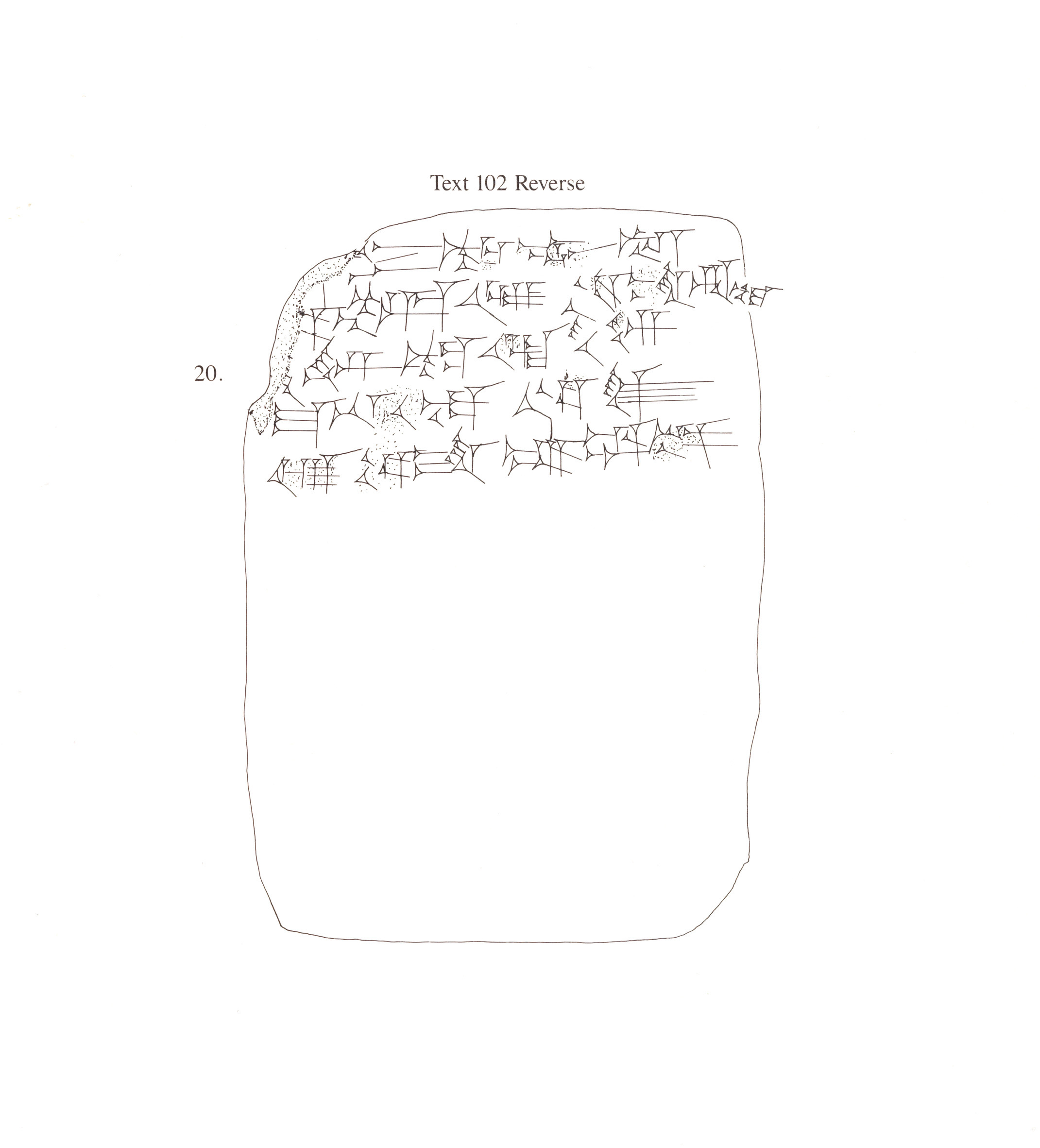
line drawing, Reverse
