= Dan (cuneiform) =

Cuneiform sign

Cuneiform, for dan, and its many other meanings.

The cuneiform dan sign is a multi-use sign found in both the 14th century BC Amarna letters and the Epic of Gilgamesh. Besides dan, (and tan), the following are its uses (from Epic of Gilgamesh):

dan
kal
lab
lap
lép
líb
líp
reb
rib
tan
GURUŠ-(GURUŠ (young man Sumerogram)

As sumerogram GURUŠ, it is only used for its Akkadian language meaning "eṭlu"-("young man"). Half of the spellings of eṭlu use GURUŠ combined with other signs, and half spell eṭlu alphabetically/syllabically. The quantities used for specific meanings of the sign, in the Epic of Gilgamesh are as follows: dan-(27), kal-(23), lab-(19), lap-(3), lép-(1), líb-(7), líp-(3), reb-(7), rib-(2), tan-(10), GURUŠ-(23).

== Amarna letter use and "dan-is" ==
Combined with is, (is (cuneiform)), the Akkadian word dan-is, "danniš", meaning "greatly", "strongly", "fervently", etc. is used in the Amarna letters, especially from Mesopotamia, of Mitanni (King Tushratta), Babylon, and others. Tushratta's letter to Pharaoh, Amarna letter EA 19, Love and Gold uses many examples of danniš; also from Tushratta, EA 26 and EA 28.

When emphasis is being reinforced, (as in specific paragraphs of EA 19), the use is danniš-danniš. In the Amarna letters a separate Canaanite version is also used: ma-gal, ma-gal (Amarna letter EA 364, and Amarna letter EA 299 for example).

A tripling of the danniš term is also known. The short letter Amarna letter EA 23, famous for its black-ink Egyptian Hieratic notation on the reverse, from Tushratta, 18 lines on obverse, and lines 19–32 on the bottom to the middle of the reverse, has a long introductory paragraph, lines 1-12. Line 12 ending the paragraph states "....everything-yours, strongly, strongly, strongly, 'may it be' ("šalāmu"-(at peace))." ("at peace" from a line previous, 'may it be', lu-ú, ending lines EA 23:6, 8, 12)

== Dan syllabic use in the Epic of Gilgamesh ==
The following words use the syllabic dan as the first syllable in the word entries under d in the glossary.

1.danānu, for English, "to be strong".
2.dannatu, "hardship, difficulty".
3.danniš, "greatlly".
4.dannūtu, "strength".
