= MUNUS =

Cuneiform sign

late Assyrian form of the MUNUS (SAL) cuneiform character.

MUNUS, 𒊩, or SAL is the capital-letter (majuscule) Sumerogram for the Akkadian language word "ṣuhārtu", young woman, or woman. The word is commonly used in the Amarna letters diplomatic letters, as well as elsewhere, for example in the Epic of Gilgamesh.

== Epic of Gilgamesh ==
The cuneiform character for woman, or "young woman", has many alternative uses in the Epic of Gilgamesh; it is used for the following: mim, (21 times); rag, (2); rak, (10); raq, (1); sal, (1); šal, (25); MÍ, (43 times).
