= Mu (cuneiform) =

Cuneiform sign

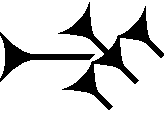
Cuneiform mu, and Sumerogram (capital letter majuscule, MU). (digitized form mu, and other meanings)

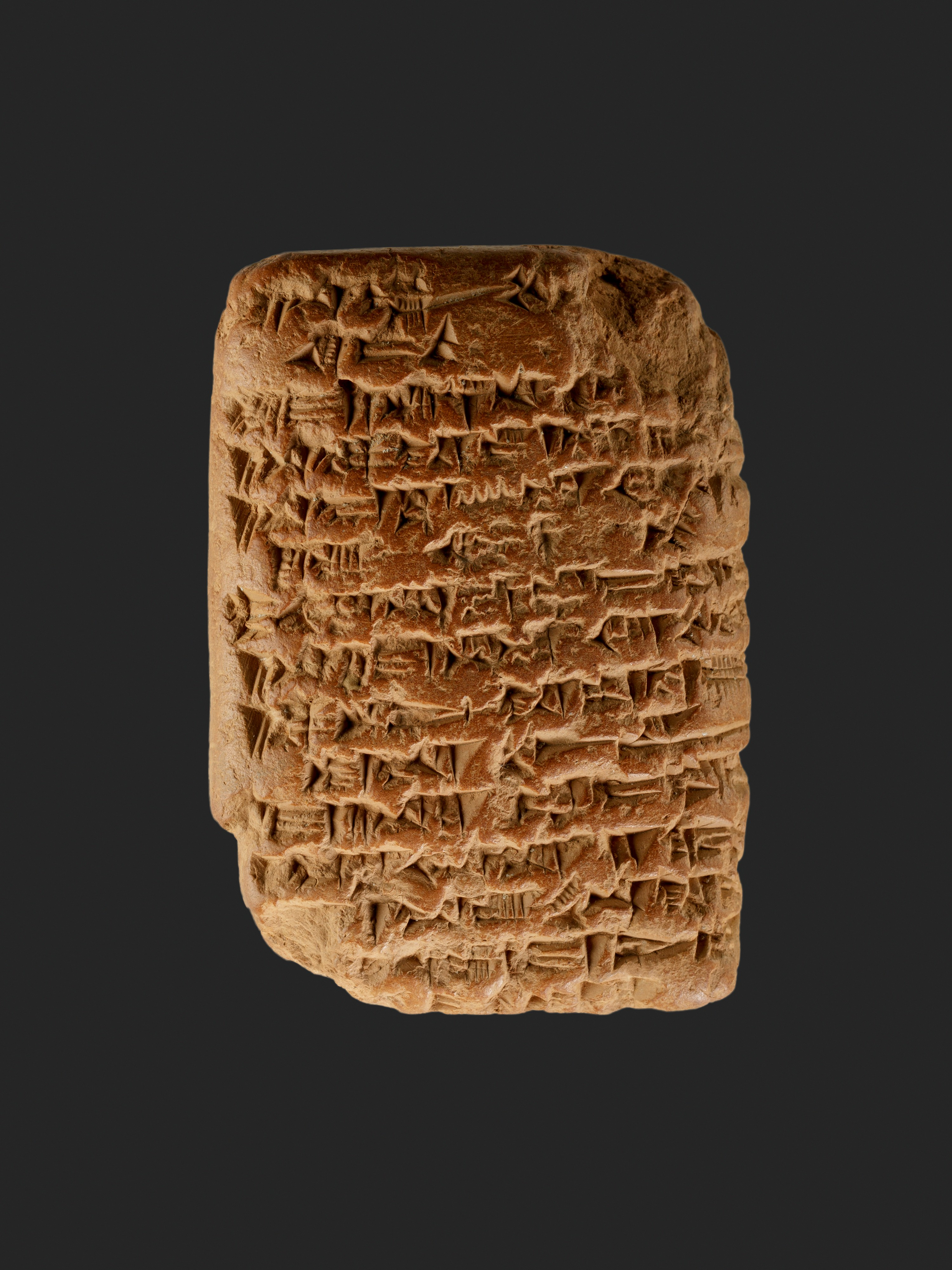
Amarna letter EA 15-(titled: "Assyria joins the International Scene"). A common Amarna letter that uses cuneiform mu. (Last cuneiform sign, line 6.)

The cuneiform sign mu, is a common-use sign of the Amarna letters, the Epic of Gilgamesh, and other cuneiform texts (for example Hittite texts). It is also used as MU in which case it is a Sumerogram meaning "name," "year" or "life."

Linguistically, it has the alphabetical usage in texts for m, or u, or syllabically for mu. The u is replaceable in word formation by any of the 4 vowels: a, e, i, or u.

One reason for the high usage of mu in the Amarna letters is for the word: "peace", or "be safe", Akkadian language šalāmu, for "to be sound, whole, safe". It is used especially between the Great King letters.

== Epic of Gilgamesh usage ==
The mu sign usage in the Epic of Gilgamesh is as follows: mu-(266 times); MU-(87).
