= Amarna letter EA 288 =

14th-century BCE Egyptian clay tablet

Amarna letter EA 288 Titled: Benign Neglect
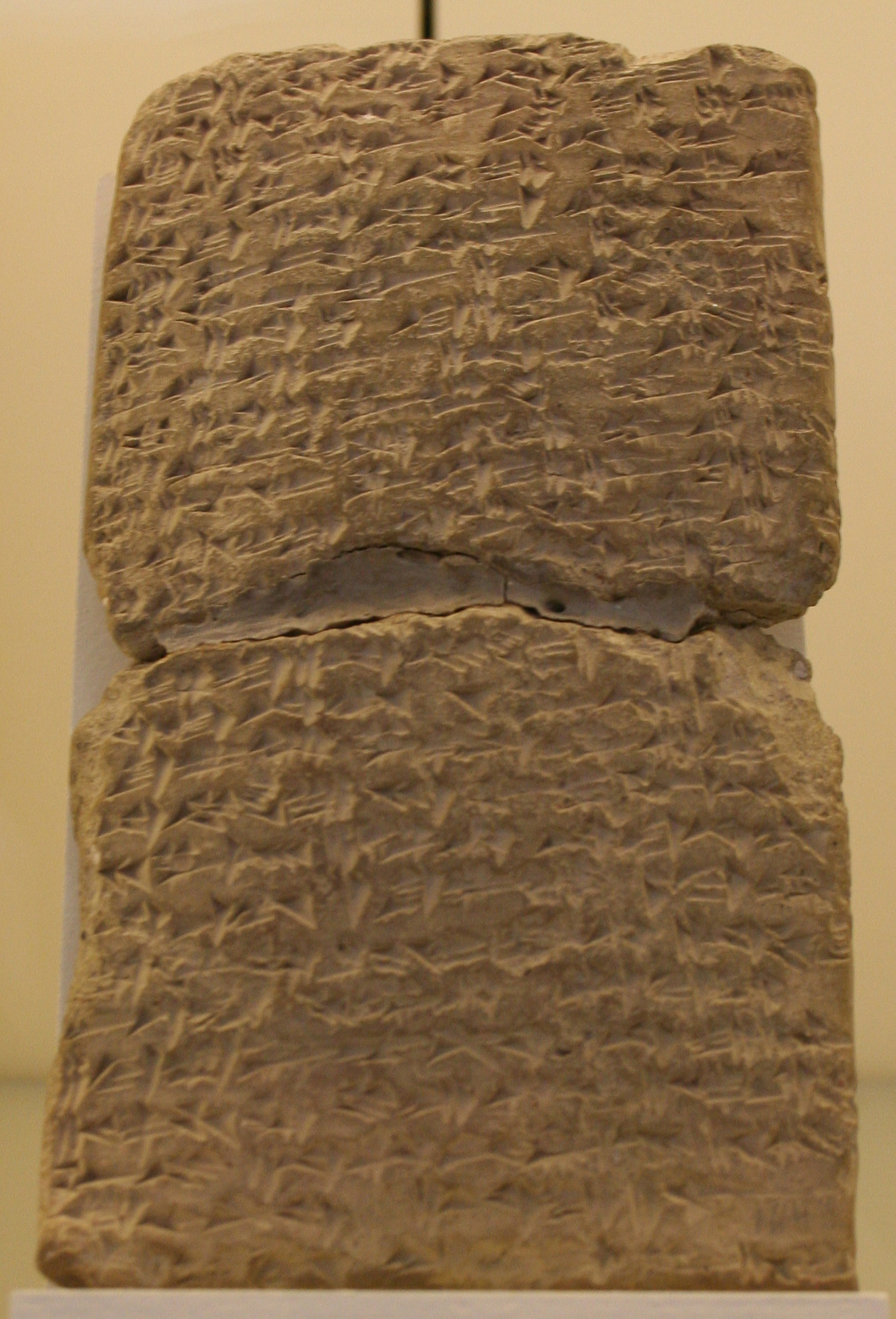
- Rib-Hadi letter to Pharaoh
- Material: Clay
- Size: Height: 16.2 cm (6.4 in); Width: 10.5 cm (4.1 in)
- Writing: cuneiform (Akkadian language)
- Created: ~1360-1335 BC (Amarna Period)
- Period/culture: Middle Babylonian
- Place: Akhetaten
- Present location: Vorderasiatisches Museum Berlin no. VAT 1643

Amarna letter EA 288, titled Benign Neglect, is a tall, finely-inscribed clay tablet letter, approximately 7.5 in tall x 4.5 in wide, broken into two pieces, from Abdi-Heba the mayor/ruler of Jerusalem, of the mid 14th century BC Amarna letters. The scribe of his six letters to Egypt were penned by the "Jerusalem scribe"; EA 288 is a moderately long, and involved letter.

The Amarna letters, about 300, numbered up to EA 382, are a mid 14th century BC, about 1350 BC and 20–25 years later, correspondence. The initial corpus of letters were found at Akhenaten's city Akhetaten, in the floor of the Bureau of Correspondence of Pharaoh; others were later found, adding to the body of letters.

Letter EA 288 (also see here-(Obverse): ), is numbered VAT 1643, from the Vorderasiatisches Museum Berlin.

A summary of letter structure: EA 288 begins with a short address to the Pharaoh. Immediately, 3 segue paragraphs begin the letter, as "dramatic statements" by the Jerusalem scribe (and Abdi-Heba); a fourth segued statement follows. Then the purpose of the letter begins, covering the second half of the letter's obverse and the reverse.

Paragraphs I-VIII (IX), complete the letter's obverse (as seen in photo).

== Cuneiform and Akkadian text, EA 288 ==
Obverse (See here: )

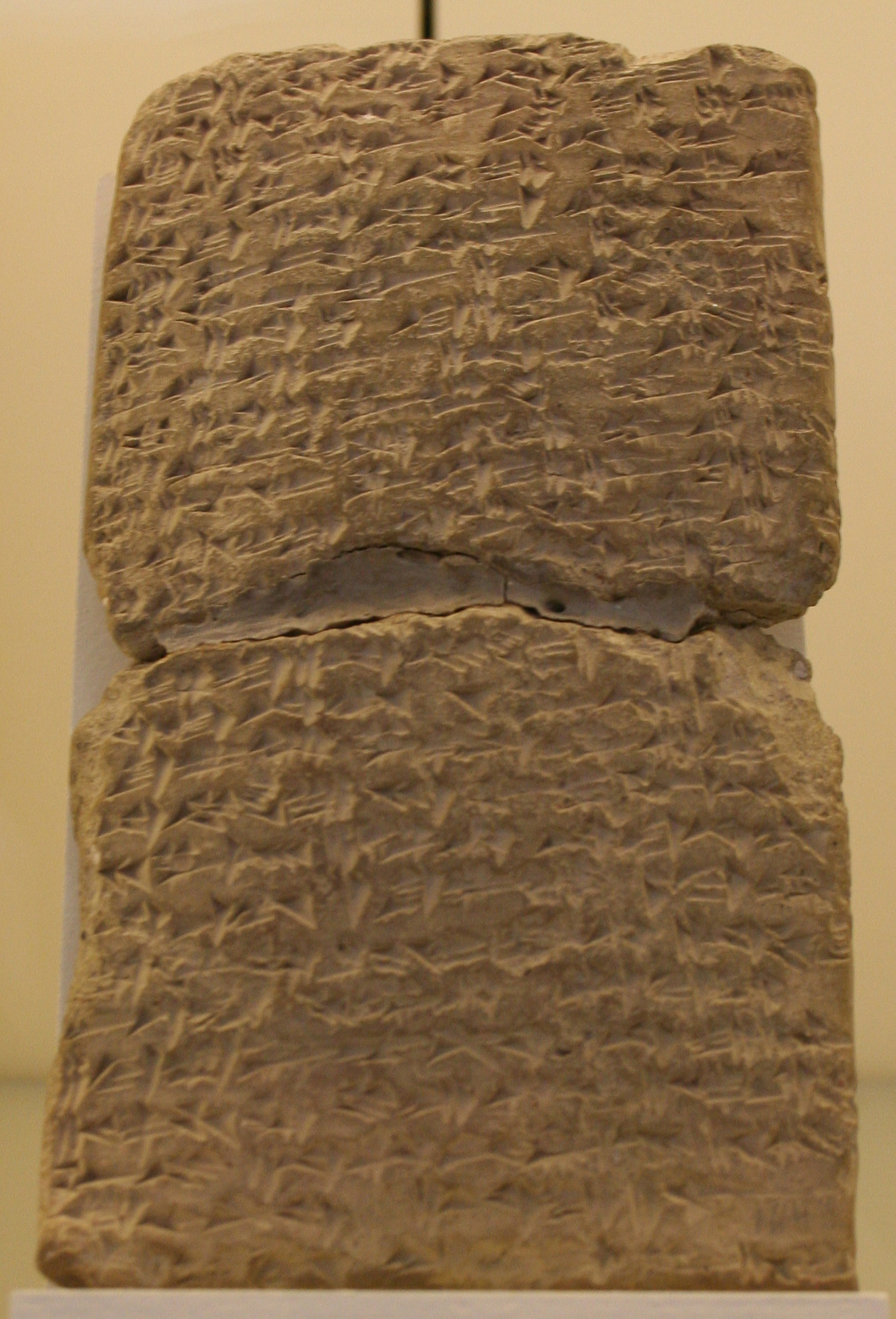

(Line 1)—[ A ]-na 1.lugal-ri-EN-ia ^{{d}}Utu-ia qi2-[ bi-ma ]–(To King-Lord-mine Sun-god, my .. Speaking )
(2)—um-ma 1.ARAD2-Hi-Ba ARAD2-ka-ma–.–.–.–(message Abdi-Heba Servant-yours)
(3)—a-na 2. giri3-meš lugal-EN-ia 7. ta-a-an–.–(at 2.(Both) Feet(s) King-Lord-mine --///-- 7. (times) )
(4)—ù 7. ta-a-an am-qut-mi–.–(..and 7. (times) --///-- I bow ! (?I address you?) )

Paragraph II
(5)—A-mur !.. lugal-ri-EN-ia ša-ka-an–.–( ! Look (here) ! .. King-Lord-mine --///-- (You) Emplaced )
(6)—szum3-szu a-na mu-s,i ^{{d}}Utu XX1–.–.–.–.–( Name-his At (the) "Setting" ^{god} Sun XX1 )
(7)—ù ir-bi ^{{d}}Utu XX2 ha-an-pa–.–( and (the) Rising(entering) ^{god}Sun XX2 --///-- growing abundantly ! )
(8)—ša ih-nu-pu a-na mu-hi-ia–.–(.. which "grows abundantly" For Me ! (?Me & Us? )

Paragraph III
(9)—A-mur !.. a-na-ku --///-- la-a Lú-Ha-zi-a-nu–.–( ! Look (here) ! --//-- {"-I- --///-- Not"} (a) Mayor (Hazzanu) ! )
(10)—Lú-ú-a-ú --////--a-na lugal-ri-EN-ia–.–( (a) Soldier --////-- For King-Lord-mine ! )

=== Akkadian (with wikilinks) ===
Obverse (See here: )

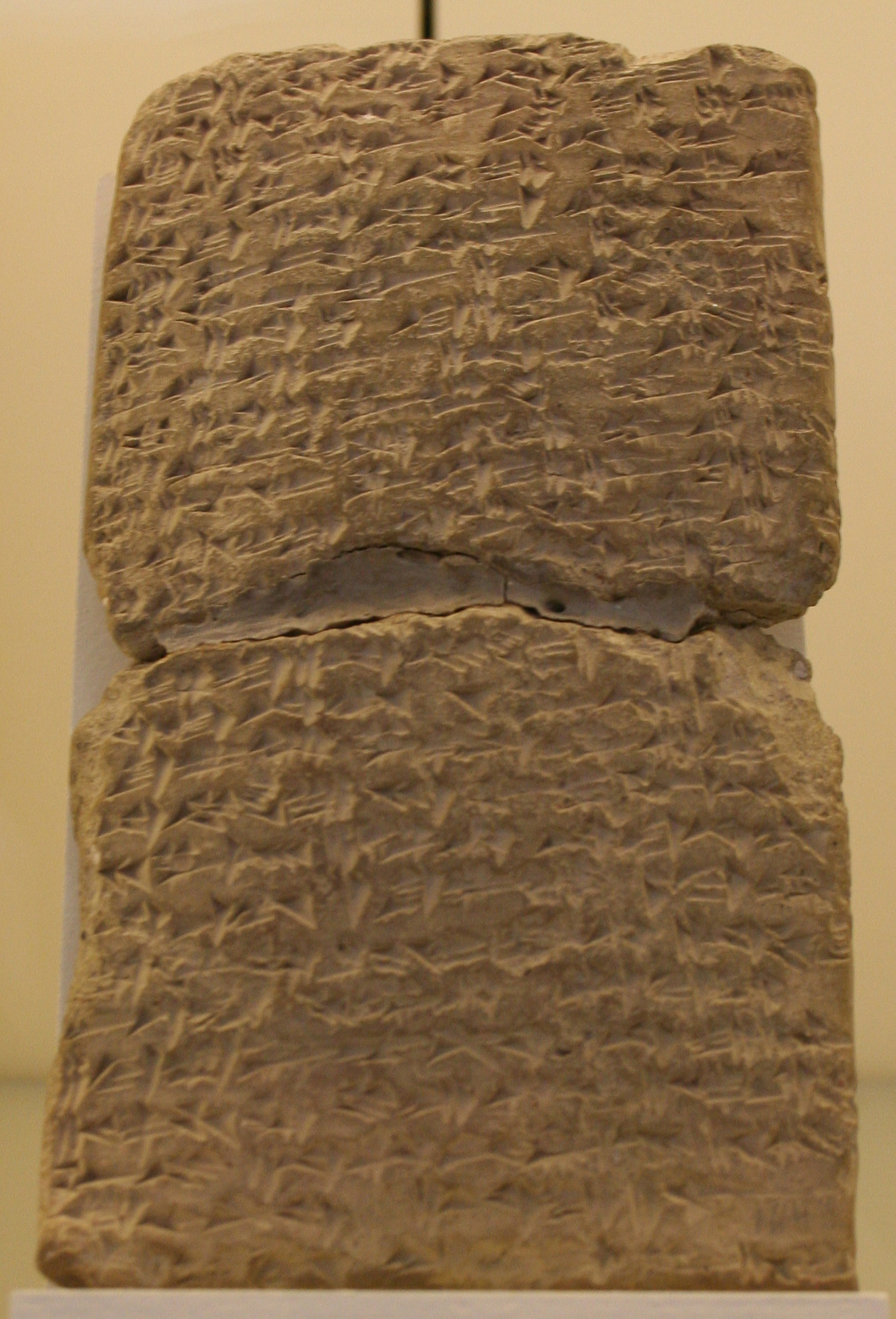
EA 288, Obverse (Vorderseite)

(Line 1)—Ana Šar-Ri-Beli-ia ^{d}Utu qabû
(2)—umma Abdi-HeBa ardu-su
(3)—Ana 2. giri3-meš Sarri-Beli-ia 7. (times)
(4)—u3 7. (ta-a-an)(times) maqātu !

Paragraph II
(5)—( ! Amāru ! .. Šar-Ri- Belu-ia --///-- (You) šakānu ..)
(6)—šumu-šu ana mušu ^{{d}}Utu XX1
(7)—ù erēbu ^{{d}}Utu XX2 --//-- hanābu !
(8)—ša hanābu muhhu-ia

Paragraph III
(9)—( ! Amāru ! .. anāku --///-- lā --///-- (a)Mayor (Hazzanu)
(10)—Lú-ú-a-ú --////-- ana Šar-Ri- Beli-ia !

== (Akkadian Text), Akkadischer Text ==
Obverse, (Vorderseite):
1. [a-n]a ^{m}šarri(LUGAL)^{ri} bêli(EN)-ia ^{d}ša[mš]i(UTU)[-ia q]í[-bi-ma]
2. um-ma ^{m}abdi(ÁRAD)-ḫi-ba ardu(ÁRAD)-ka-ma
3. a-na 2^{(m)} šêpē(GÌRI^{meš}) šarri(LUGAL) bêl(EN)-ia 7^{(m)}-ta-a-an
4. ù 7^{(m)}-ta-a-an am-qut-mi
5. a-mur šarri(LUGAL)^{ri} bêli(EN)-ia ša-ka-an
6. šùm-šu a-na mu-ṣi ^{d}šamši(UTU)^{ši}
7. ù ir-bi ^{d}šamši(UTU)^{ši} ḫa-an-pa
8. ša iḫ-nu-pu a-na mu-ḫi-ia
9. a-mur a-na-ku la-a ^{lú}ḫa-zi-a-nu
10. ^{lú}ú-e-ú <a-na-ku> a-na šarri(LUGAL)^{ri} bêli(EN)-ia
11. a-mur a-na-ku ^{lú}ruì šarri(LUGAL)^{ri}
12. ù ú-bi-il bilat(GUN) šarri(LUGAL)^{ri} a-na-ku
13. ia-a-nu-mi ^{lú}ad-da-a-ni ia-a-nu-mi
14. ^{munus}um-mi-ia zu-ru-uḫ šarri(LUGAL)^{ri} dannu(KAL.GA)
15. [š]a-ak-n[a-an-ni] i-na bît(É) ^{lú}ad-da-[a-ni]
16. [...]
17. [k]a-ša-ad a-na mu-ḫi-ia qa-a [...]
18. na-ad-na-ti 1^{(u)} ^{lú}ardūti(ÁRAD^{meš})[ a-na q]a-[t]i-[šu]
19. ^{m}šu-ú-ta ^{lú}rabiṣ(MÁŠKIM) šarri(LUGAL)^{ri} ka-š[a-ad]
20. [a]-na mu-ḫi-ia 2^{(u)} 1^{(m)} ^{munus}mârāti(DUMU.MUNUS^{meš})
21. 1^{(géš)} 2^{(u)} ^{lú.meš}a-ší-ri na-ad-na-ti
22. [a]-na qa-ti ^{m}šu-ú-ta qîšat(NÍG.BA) šarri(LUGAL) bêli(EN)-ia
23. li-im-li-ik-mi šarri(LUGAL)^{ri} a-na mâti(KUR)-šu
24. ḫal-qà-at mât(KUR) šarri(LUGAL)^{ri} gáb-ba-ša
25. ṣa-ba-ta-ni nu-kúr-tú a-na ia-a-ši
26. a-di mâtāti(KUR^{ḫi.a}) še-e-ri^{ki} a-di alu(IRI) gín-ti-ki-ir-mi-il
27. šal-mu a-na gáb-bi ^{lú.meš}ḫa-zi-a-nu-ti
28. ù nu-kur-tú a-na ia-a-ši
29. ip-ša-ti e-nu-ma ^{lú}ḫa-pí-ri
30. ù la-a a-mar 2^{(m)} înā(IGI^{meš}) šarri(LUGAL)
31. bêli(EN)-ia ki-i nu-kúr-tú
Reverse, (Rückseite):

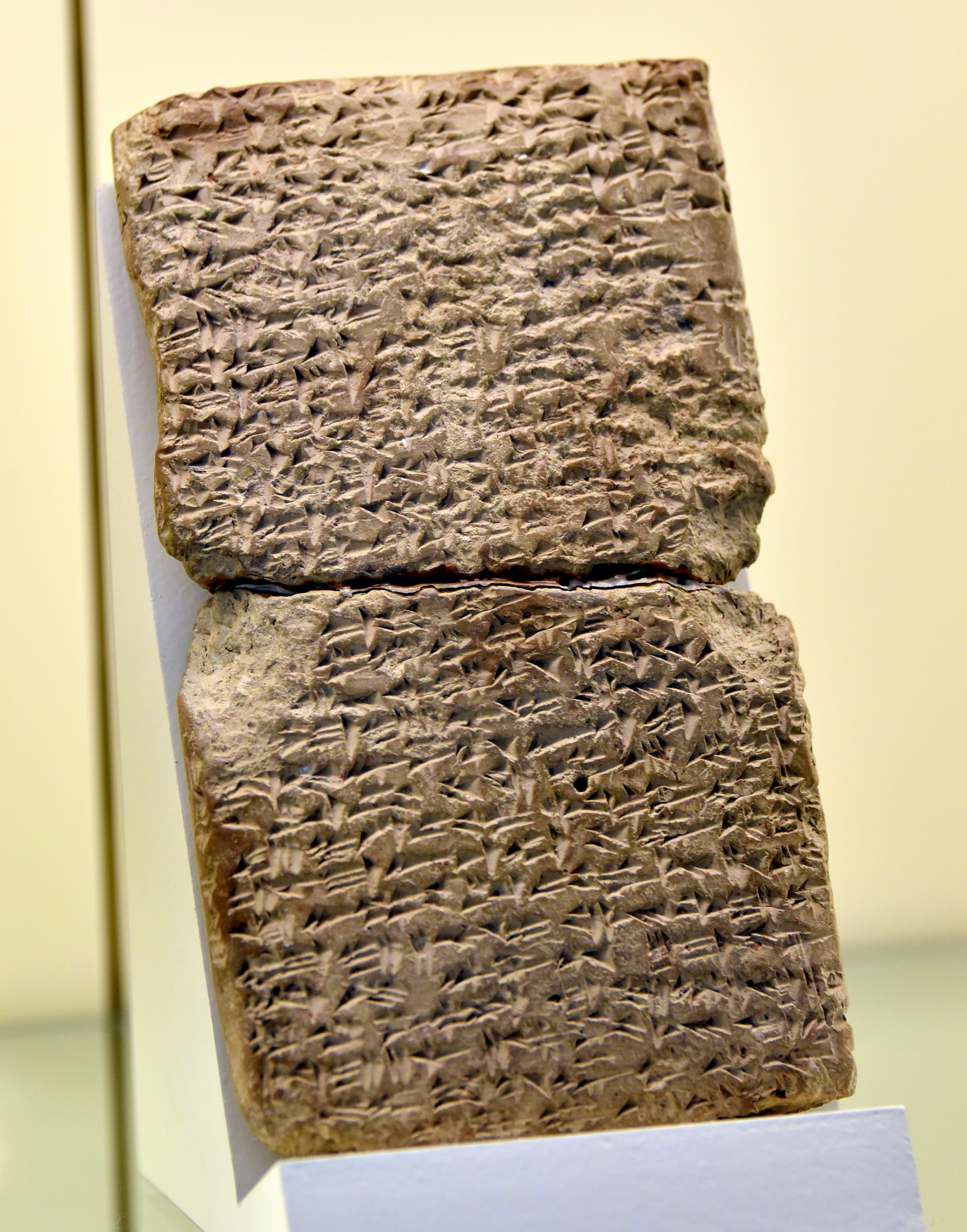
EA 288, Reverse, (Rückseite)

32. a-na muḫḫi(UGU)^{ḫi}-ia ša-ak-na-ti
33. e-nu-ma ^{geš}elippa(MÁ) i-na lìb-bi tâmti(A.AB.BA)
34. qât(ŠU) zu-ru-uḫ šarri(LUGAL) dannatu(KAL.GA)
35. ti-li-iq-qí ^{kur}na-aḫ-ri-ma^{ki}
36. ù ^{kur}ka-<pa-si>^{ki} x ka-a-si^{ki} ù i-na-an-na
37. alāni(IRI.DIDLI^{ḫi.a}) šarri(LUGAL)^{ri}
38. ti-le-qé-ú ^{lú.meš}ḫa-pí-ru
39. ia-a-nu-mi 1^{(m)-en} ^{lú}ḫa-zi-a-nu
40. a-na šarri(LUGAL)^{ri} bêli(EN)-ia ḫal-qu gáb-bu
41. a-mur ^{m}tu-ur-ba-zu gaz(GAZ) d[e_{4}-k]a
42. i-na abul(KÁ.GAL) alu(IRI) sí-lu-ú^{ki} qa-al šarru(LUGAL)^{ru}
43. a-mur ^{m}zi-im-ri-da alu(IRI) la-ki-si^{ki}
44. ig-gi-ú-šu ardūtu(ÁRAD^{meš}) ip-šu a-na ^{lú.meš}ḫa-pí-ri
45. ^{m}ia-ap-ti-iḫ-^{d}adda(IŠKUR) gaz(GAZ) te-k[a]
46. [i-n]a abul(KÁ.GAL) alu(IRI) zi-lu-ú ka-al
47. [a-mi]-nim [l]a-a i-ša-al-šu[-nu šarru(LUGAL)^{ru}]
48. [ù li]-is-kín šarru(LUGAL)^{[ru} a-na mâti(KUR)-šu]
49. [ù l]i-din šarru(LUGAL)^{ru} pa-ni-šu ù [lu-ṣi-m]i
50. [amêlūtu(LÚ^{meš}] ṣâbē(ÉRIN^{meš}) pi-ṭa-ti a-na mâti(KUR)-š[u]
51. [ù] šum-ma ia-a-nu-mi ṣâbē(ÉRIN^{meš}) pi-ṭa-tu_{4}
52. i-na šatti(MU) an-ni-ti ḫal-qa-at a-ba-da-at
53. gáb-bi mâtat(KUR^{ḫi.a}) šarri(LUGAL)^{ri} bêli(EN)-ia
54. la-a i-qa-bi-ú a-na pa-ni šarri(LUGAL) bêli(EN)-ia
55. e-nu-ma ḫal-qa-at mât(KUR) šarri(LUGAL) bêli(EN)-ia
56. ù ḫal-qu gáb-bi ^{lú.meš}ḫa-zi-a-nu-ti
57. šum-ma ia-a-nu-mi ṣâbē(ÈRIN^{meš}) pi-ṭa-tu_{4}
58. i-na šatti(MU) an-ni-ti lu-ma-še-er
59. šarru(LUGAL)^{ru} ^{lú}rabiṣa(MÁŠKIM) ù li-il-qé-a-ni
60. a-na ia-a-ši a-di aḫē(ŠEŠ^{meš}) ù Ba.Bad(BA.ÚŠ)
61. ni-mu-tu_{4} it-ti šarru(LUGAL)^{ru} bêli(EN)-nu
62. [a-na] ^{lú}túp-šar(DUB.SAR) šarri(LUGAL)^{ri} bêli(EN)-ia
63. [um-ma] ^{m}abdi(ÁRAD)-ḫi-ba ardu(ÁRAD)-ma a-na 2^{(m)} šêp[ē](GÌRI^{meš})
64. [am-q]ut-mi še-ri-ib a-wa-ta_{5}^{meš}
65. [b]a-na-ti a-na šarri(LUGAL)^{r[i]}
66. [danniš(MA.GAL) ^{lú]}ardu(ÁRAD)-[ka ù ^{l]ú}mâru(DUMU)-ka a-na-ku

=== Cuneiform score, Akkadian, English ===
Cuneiform score (per CDLI, Chicago Digital Library Initiative), and Akkadian, and English.

Paragraph-(lines 23-33)
Note: Segue-(transition), from Obverse,
+ Obverse-bottom, to Reverse (lines 23-33)

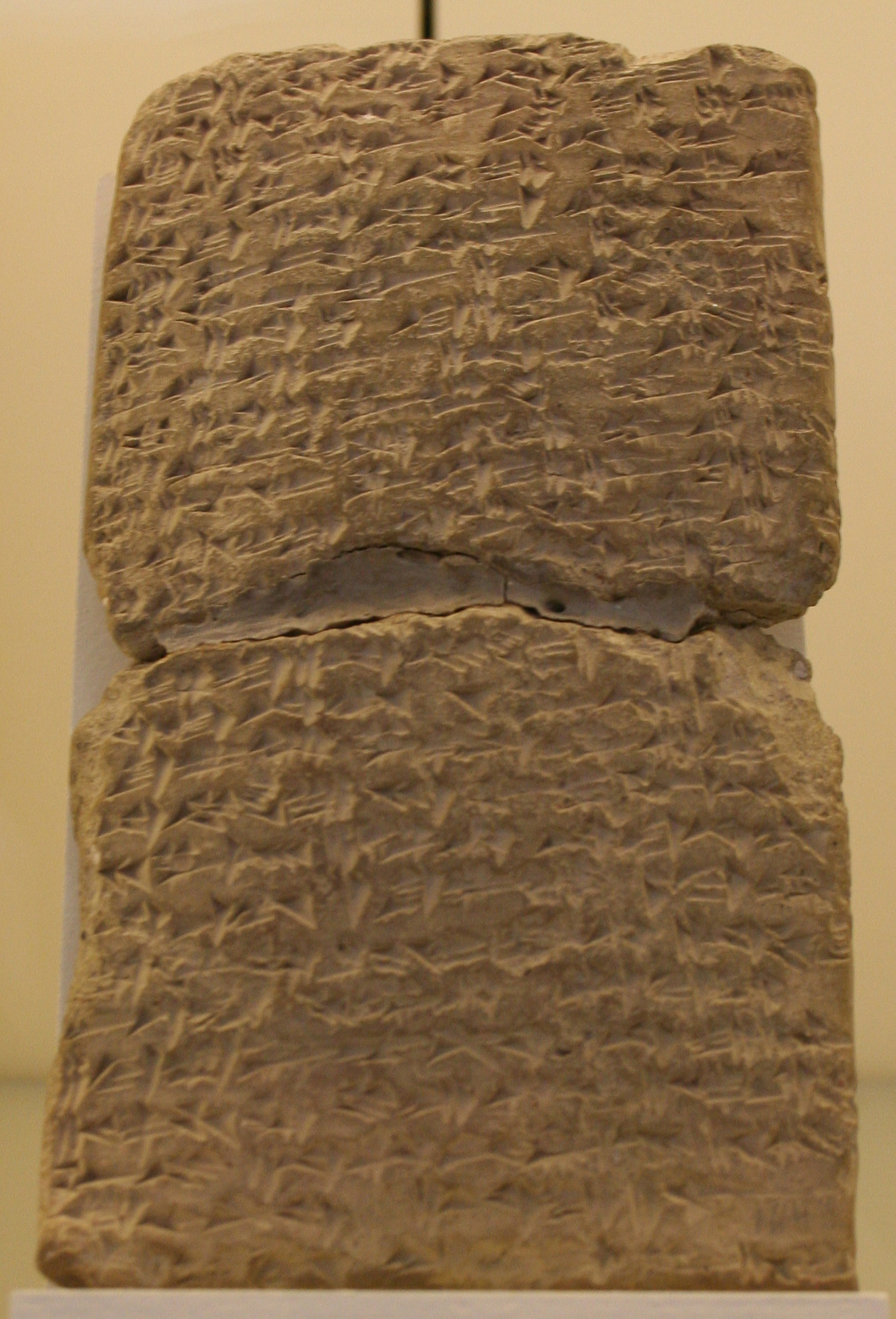
EA 288, Obverse (Vorderseite) Obverse & Bottom: Lines: 1-31 (31.5)

(Sub-Section 1 of 4), (lines 23-26)
23. li-im-li-ik-mi lugal-ri a-na kur-šu
___ malāku (Šárru)Šarru-ri ana mātu-šu–!
___ Give-concern King^{ri} for Land-His–!
24. hal-qà-at kur lugal-ri gáb-ba-ša
___ halāqu mātu Šarru^{ri}, gabbu-ša,
___ Over-Taken land-("region") King^{ri}, All-His,
24.8.--------gáb-ba-ša
___------------gabbu-ša –
___------------All-His –
25. ṣa-ba-ta-ni nu-KÚR-tú a-na ia-a-ši
___ ṣabātu nukurtu ana Iāši–!
___ "captured-in" warfare, from Me–!
26. a-di kur-^{hi.a} Še-e-ri^{ki} a-di Gín-ti-Ki-ir-mi-il
___ adi mātu-^{(pl.)}-(matāti) Šeri^{ki}, adi Gínti-k-ir-m-il–!
___ also(plus) lands^{(pl.)} Šeri, plus GintiKirmil–!
(Sub-Section 2 of 4), (lines 27-28)
27. šal-mu a-na gáb-bi, ^{lú.meš} ha-zi-a-nu-ti
___ šalāmu ana gabbu, lú(amēlu)^{meš} Hazannu–!,
___ Peace for all, Men^{pl.} Hazannu-(Governors)–!,
28. ù nu-kur-tú a-na ia-a-ši
___ U nukurtu ana Iāši–!
___ But warfare for Me- (Governor of Jerusalem)–!
(Sub-Section 3 of 4), (lines 29-31.5)
29. ip-ša-ti e-nu-ma ^{lú}ha-pí-ri
___ Epēšu enūma ^{lú}Hapiru–!
___ (I am)-made now (as a) (("rebel"))-^{MAN}Habiru–!
30. ù la-a a-mar 2^{(m)} înā(IGI^{meš}) šarri(LUGAL)
___u lā amāru 2 īnu^{pl.} Šarru-(Phar.)-
___ and not ((able to)) see (2 eyes)^{pl.} ("Face/Countenance") (of-the) King-
31. bêli(EN)-ia, ki-i nu-kúr-tú–!
___-bēlu-ia —
___-Lord-mine —
(Sub-Section 4 of 4), (lines 31.5-33)
31.5--------ki-i nu-kúr-tu
___------------ — kī nukurtu–! —
___------------ — "Because–of" warfare–! —

Reverse, (Rückseite):

(Sub-Section 4 of 4), (lines 31.5-33)
Sub-Paragraph—Exclamation-(lines 31.5-33)

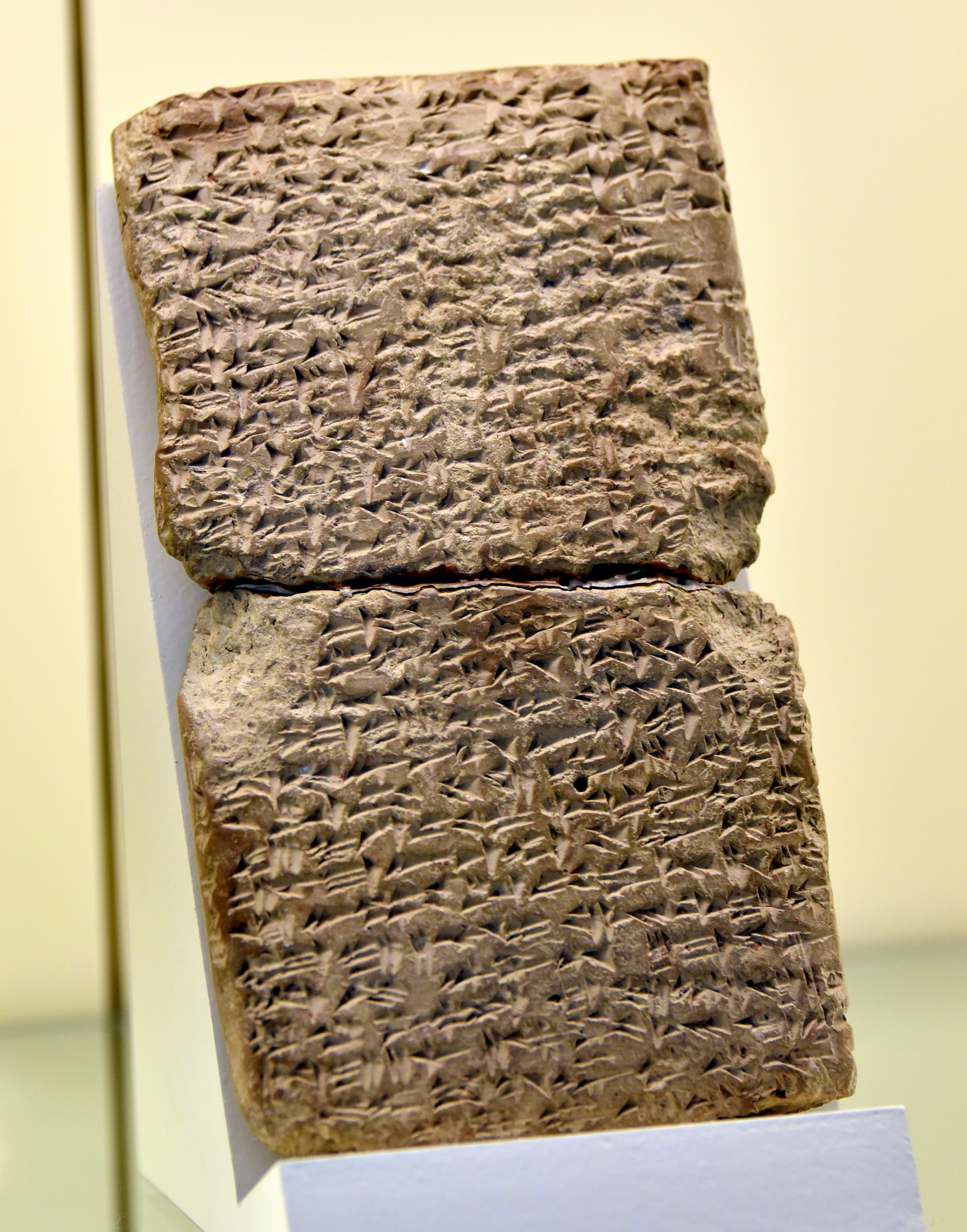
EA 288, Reverse, (Rückseite) (lines 32-65, (+66))

31.5--------ki-i nu-kúr-tu
___------------ — kī nukurtu–! —
___------------ — "Because–of" warfare–! —

((Reverse side starts here))

32. a-na muḫḫi(UGU)^{ḫi}-ia ša-ak-na-ti
___ ana muhhu-(ia) šakānu
___ for upon-ME, emplaced,
33. e-nū-ma ^{geš}elippa(MÁ) i-na lìb-bi tâmti(A.AB.BA)
___ Enūma ^{giš}MÁ(eleppu) ina libbu tâmtu(A.AB.BA)-(the sea)–!
___ Now (I am) ^{((wooden))}SHIP in the HEART-(middle) (of a) STORM-! (middle of the sea–! )
End of Sub-Sections

End of segue-(transition), to Reverse (lines 23-31.5, 31.5-33)

Paragraph, (lines 34-40)

34. qât(ŠU) zu-ru-uḫ šarri(LUGAL) dannatu(KAL.GA
___qātu zuruh, Šarru kal-ga
___(the)-Hand strong, King-mighty
35. ti-li-iq-qí ^{kur}na-aḫ-ri-ma^{ki}
___halāqu KUR naḫrima^{ki}–!
___Over-Took land((region)) Nahrima-(i.e. Aram-Naharaim)–!
36. ù ^{kur}ka-<pa-si>^{ki} x ka-a-si^{ki} ù i-na-an-na
___u kur ka-((<pa))-si>^{ki} x ka-a-si^{ki}, u eninna
___and land Kasi (( x Kasi )), and now
36.6--------ù i-na-an-na
___------------U eninna
___------------And now
37. alāni(IRI.DIDLI^{ḫi.a}) šarri(LUGAL)^{ri}
___alāni(IRI.DIDLI^{ḫi.a}) Šarru^{ri}
___Cities^{ḫi.a} (of the) King
38. ti-le-qé-ú ^{lú.meš}ḫa-pí-ru
___halāqu lú-meš ḫapíru–!
___Over-Taken (by) men^{pl.} Hapiru–!
39. ia-a-nu-mi 1^{(m)-en} ^{lú}ha^{#}-zi-a-nu
___ia-a-nu-mi 1^{(m)-EN}(bēlu), — ^{lú(amēlu)}Hazannu
___"there-is-NOT" One (1) Lord, — ^{Man}Hazannu (Governor),..
40. a-na šarri(LUGAL)^{ri} bêli(EN)-ia, — hal-qu gáb-bu–!
___ana Šarru-ri EN-ia —,
___for King-Lord-mine —,
40.6 ------------- ḫal-qu gáb-bu
40.6--------------- halāqu gabbu–!
40.6--------------- (Over)-Taken All–!

Paragraph-(l. 41-47)

41. a-mur ^{1=diš}tu-ur-ba-zu gaz(GAZ^{#}) d[e_{4}-k]a-(dâku)
___amāru–! — ^{1=diš}Turbazu gaz(GAZ^{#}) d[e_{4}-k]a-(dâku)
___Look (here)–! — Turbazu "killed"-!
42. i-na abul(KÁ.GAL) alu(IRI^{#}) sí-lu-ú^{ki} qa-al šarru(LUGAL)^{ru}
___ina abullu ālu Silu^{ki} ga-al šarru(LUGAL)^{ru}
___in city-gate city Silu^{ki}, "tragedy"?, King^{ru} (Phar.)
43. a-mur ^{1=m(male)=diš}zi-im-ri-da alu(IRI) la^{#}-ki^{#}-si^{ki}
___amāru–! — ^{1=m(male)=diš}Zimredda ālu(IRI) Lachish^{ki}
___Look (here)–! — ^{m}Zimredda city Lachish
44. ig-gi-ú-šu ardūtu(ÁRAD^{meš}) ip-šu a-na ^{lú^{#}.meš}ḫa^{#}-pí^{#}-ri^{#}
___ig-gi-ú-šu ardu-meš, epēšu ana lú^{#}.meš-hapiru
___"killed-by" servants-(pl.), "committed" to men(amēlu)-pl.-(Hapiru("done by men-Hapiru"))
45. ^{m}ia-ap-ti-iḫ-^{d}adda(IŠKUR) gaz(GAZ) te-k[a^{#} ]
___^{m=1=diš}Yaptih-Hadda gaz(GAZ) te-k[a^{#} ]
___^{m=1=diš}Yaptih-Hadda slain
46. [ i-n]a abul(KÁ.GAL) alu(IRI) zi-lu-ú ka-al
___ina abullu ālu Silu^{ki} ka-al
___in city-gate city Silu^{ki} ?killed,
47. [a-mi]-nim [l]a-a i-ša-al-šu[-nu šarru(LUGAL)^{ru} ]

Paragraph-(l. ?47-53)

47. [a-mi]-nim [l]a-a i-ša-al-šu[-nu šarru(LUGAL)^{ru} ]
48. [ù li]-is-kín šarru(LUGAL)^{[ru} a-na mâti(KUR)-šu]
49. [ù l]i-din šarru(LUGAL)^{ru} pa-ni-šu ù [lu-ṣi-m]i
50. [amêlūtu(LÚ^{meš}] ṣâbē(ÉRIN^{meš}) pí-ta-ti a-na mâti(KUR)-š[u
___ _LÚ^{meš}-(amēlu)^{pl.} pítati, — ana māti(KUR)
___men-(pl.) army-(pl.) pítati, — for land-his
51. [ù] šum^{#}-ma ia-a-nu-mi ṣâbē(ÈRIN^{meš}) pi-ṭa-tu_{4}
___u šumma ia-a-nu-mi ṣābu-meš pi-ṭa-tu_{4}
___and if "there is not" army-(pl.)-pítati -- (lines 57 & 51 are identical)
52. i-na šatti(MU) an-ni-ti ḫal-qa-at a-ba-da-at
___ina šattu (MU) annû, — ḫalāqu a-ba-da-at(abātu-"destroyed"?)
___in year this, — Over-Taken, (destroyed?)
53. : (–gl–) gáb-bi _mâtat(KUR^{HI.A})_ _šarri(SÀR-^{ri}_ _bêli(EN)_-ia
___ : (–gl–) gabbu mātu^{HI.A}, – SÀR-ru, bēlu-ia, —!
___all lands^{pl.}, – King, Lord-mine, —!

Paragraph-(l. 54-61)

54. la-a i-qa-bi-ú a-na pa-ni šarri(_LUGAL_) bêli(_EN_)-ia
___lā qabû pānu, — King Bēlu-mine
___(( (This-is)-"Not spoken before", — King Lord-mine))
55. e-nu-ma ḫal-qa-at mât(_KUR_) _šarri(ŠÀRru_) bêli(_EN_)-ia
___enūma ḫalāqu mātu(KUR), – Šarri(LUGAL) bēlu(EN)-ia–! —
___Now Over-Taken land("region"), – King-Lord-mine–! —
56. ù hal-qu gáb-bi ^{lú.meš}ha-zi-a-nu-ti
___u ḫalāqu gabbu, – lú(amēlu)-meš-Hazannu–!,
___and over-taken all, – men-(pl.)-Hazannu–!
57. šum-ma ia-a-nu-mi ṣâbē(ÈRIN^{meš}) pi-ṭa-tu_{4}
___šumma ia-a-nu-mi ṣābu-meš pi-ṭa-tu_{4},
___If "there is not" army-(pl.)-pítati, -- (lines 57 & 51 are identical)
58. i-na šatti(MU) an-ni-ti lu-ma-še-er
___ina šattu (MU) annû, — lu-ma-še-er
___in year this, — lu-ma-še-er (?lūman)-"Now, alas!"?)
59. šarru(LUGAL)^{ru} ^{lú}rabiṣa(MÁŠKIM) ù li-il-qé-a-ni
60. a-na ia-a-ši a-di aḫē(ŠEŠ^{meš}) ù Ba.Bad(BA.ÚŠ)
61. ni-mu-tu_{4} it-ti šarru(LUGAL)^{ru} bêli(EN)-nu

Paragraph, lines 62-66
Note: Final address to the "King-Lord-mine" (Pharaoh, and Pharaoh's scribe)

62. [ a-na ] _^{lú#}dup-sar(DUB.SAR)_ _lugal-ri_ _EN_-ia
___Ana ^{lú#}țupšarru-(=țuppu-šarru, Tablet-King, i.e. "Scribe"), ((u)) Šarru-ri bēlu-ia
___To man-"scribe-(King)", ((and)) "King-Lord-mine"
63. [ um-ma ] ^{m}abdi(ÁRAD)-ḫi-ba ardu(ÁRAD)-ma a-na 2^{(m)} šêp[ē](GÌRI^{meš#})
___umma 1^{(=diš)}-ÁRAD-hi-ba, ardu ana 2 _šepu^{pl.}_^{#}
___[ message(=Report?)] 1-Abdi-Heba, servant at the 2-feet^{pl.}
64. [ am-q]ut^{#}-mi, še-ri-ib, a-wa-ta_{5}^{meš^{#}}
___maqātu, șēru, ((my))-"Story", (word^{(pl.)}) (=amatu^{pl.)#})
___I bow, (on-my-back) (="defenselessly"), ((my))-story (words^{pl.)})
65. [ b]a#-na-ti a-na šarri_(LUGAL)^{r[i]}_
___[b]anû A, & banû B ana (Šárru)Šarru-[ ri ]
___((produced))-"created, and 'to-be-good' ", for King-[ ri ]

Line 66, on Left side
66. [ danniš(MA.GAL) _^{lú]}ardu(ÁRAD)_-[ ka ù ] _^{lú}mâru(DUMU)_-ka a-na-ku
___[ magal (= danniš), (anāku)-^{lú ]}ardu-[ ka–!, u] (anāku)-^{lú]}dūmu-ka anāku((as verb, "I am"))–!
___Fervently(strongly), (I am) servant-yours–!, and (I am) son-(="Compatriot")-yours ( I(=anāku) = "I am", (as verb) )–!

== See also ==
- Abdi-Heba
- Amarna letters–phrases and quotations
- List of Amarna letters by size
  - Amarna letter EA 5, EA 9, EA 15, EA 19, EA 26, EA 27, EA 35, EA 38
  - EA 153, EA 161, EA 288, EA 364, EA 365, EA 367

== Ext links ==
- Line drawing of EA 288, CDLI
- CDLI entry of EA 288 ( Chicago Digital Library Initiative )
- CDLI listing of all EA Amarna letters, 1-382
- VAT, Vorderasiatische Museum (Berlin) entry for EA 288; Views of Obverse, Reverse, & sides (7 photos)
