= Šum (cuneiform) =

Cuneiform sign

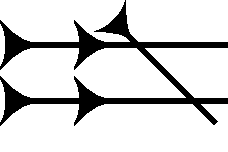
Cuneiform šum; also tag, tak, taq, and TAG.

The cuneiform sign šum is a common-use sign of the Amarna letters, the Epic of Gilgamesh, and other cuneiform texts (for example Hittite texts).

Linguistically, it has a syllabic usage for šum, as well as for tag, tak, and taq. It can also be used alphabetically for š, m, t, g, k, or q, and also as a replacement for the four vowels, of a, or e, or i, or u.

== Epic of Gilgamesh usage ==
The šum sign usage in the Epic of Gilgamesh is as follows: (šum, 34 times, tag, 2, tak, 23, and taq, 7 times).

== Amarna letters usage ==
A common usage of the šum cuneiform in the Amarna letters is for the Akkadian word šumma,, for English if. In the letters the strife with the Habiru, taking over cities, (city-states), the reference is, "If the pharaoh doesn't send the archer force, our town is lost!".

== Gallery ==
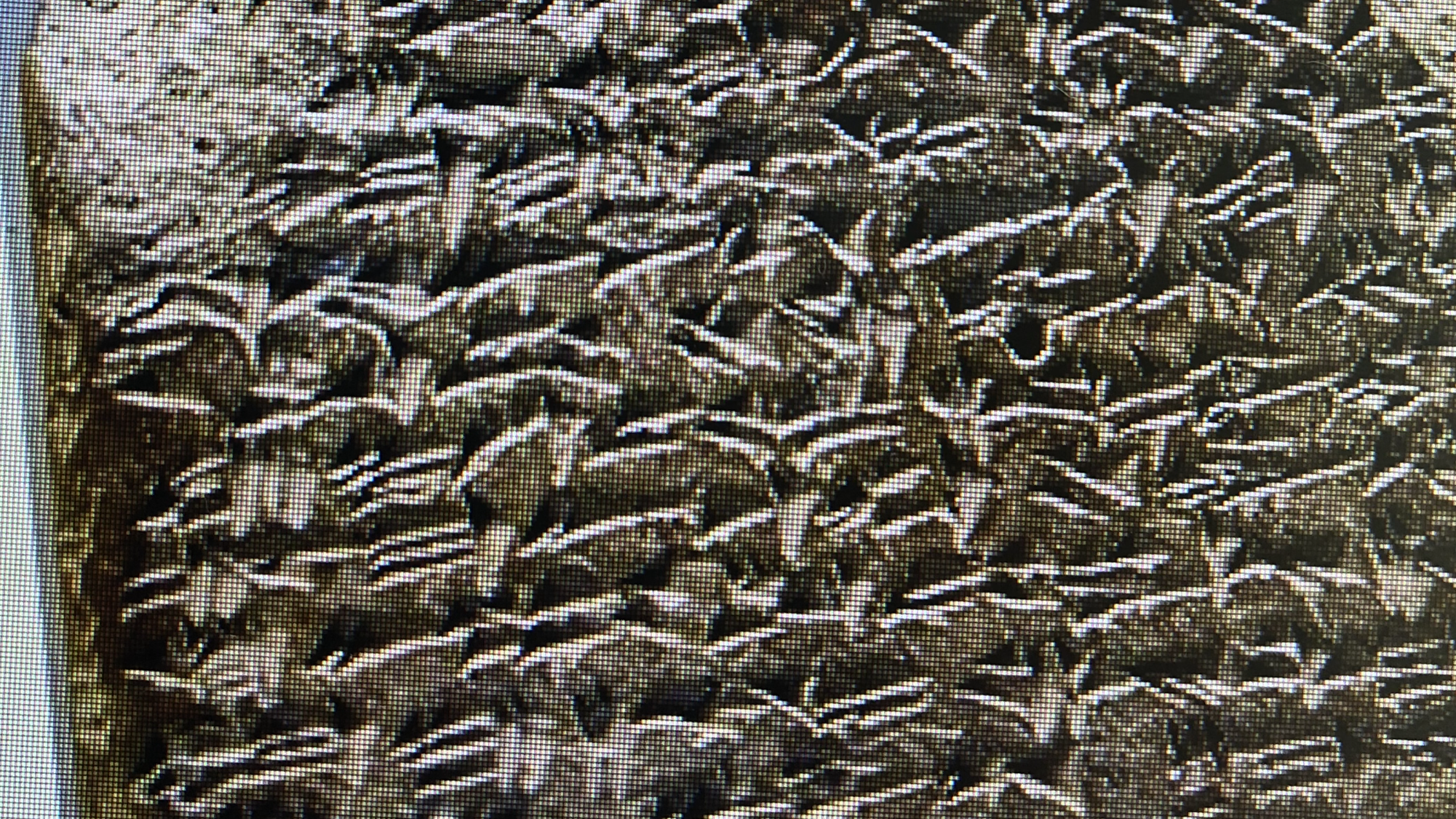
šumma, last line, ma more visible than šum (line 57, of 66) after šumma, 4 cuneiform characters are used. In the Amarna letters, – they are translated in English, as "there-is-not". Lines 55–57, from Amarna letter EA 288-(Reverse) are: 55. e-nu-ma ḫal-qa-at mât(_KUR_) _šarri(ŠÀRru_) bêli(_EN_)-ia; ___enūma ḫalāqu mātu(KUR), – Šarri(LUGAL) bēlu(EN)-ia–! — ___Now Over-Taken land("region"), – King-Lord-mine–! —: 56. ù hal-qu gáb-bi ^{lú.meš}ha-zi-a-nu-ti; ___u ḫalāqu gabbu, – lú(amēlu)-meš-Hazannu–!, ___and over-taken all, – men-(pl.)-Hazannu–!: 57. šum-ma ia-a-nu-mi ṣâbē(ÈRIN^{meš}) pi-ṭa-tu_{4}; ___šumma ia-a-nu-mi ṣābu-meš pi-ṭa-tu_{4}, ___If "there is not" army-(pl.)-pítati, -- (lines 57 & 51 are identical) Line 51 is the second line from top, and ma is easily visible; the right part of šum is visible; I put a damaged #, marker at the cuneiform spot in line 51, EA 288.
