= Amarna letter EA 330 =

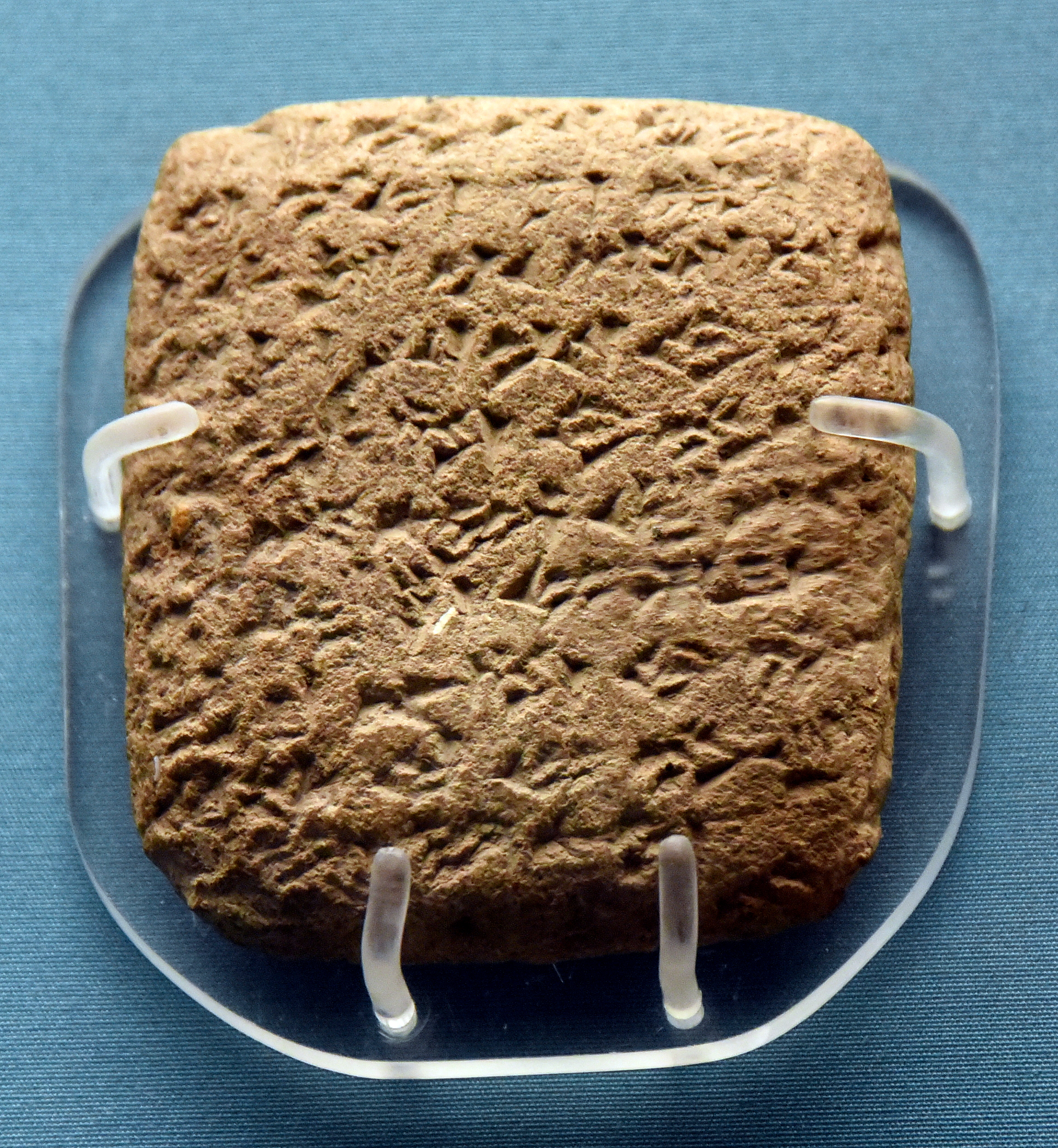
Amarna letter EA 330, from Šipṭi-Ba'la, (mayor)/governor of Lachish. (very high-resolution expandable photo)

Amarna letter EA 330, titled: "Dirt at the Feet of the King" is an ovate-(squarish)-shaped, small-sized letter, from Šipṭi-Ba'la the mayor/ruler of Lachish (Tel Lachish), of the mid 14th century BC Amarna letters.

The Canaanite city-states were visited by the scribes, with short 'status reports' sent to the Pharaoh (King) reporting on city or regional accounts, for example the troubles with the habiru, or other external affairs. Many of the Canaanite letters are short, with some nearly identical phraseology of words, as well as the layout of the individual clay tablet letters.

The Amarna letters, about 300, numbered up to EA 382, are a mid 14th century BC, about 1350 BC and 20–25 years later, correspondence. The initial corpus of letters were found at Akhenaten's city Akhetaten, in the floor of the Bureau of Correspondence of Pharaoh; others were later found, adding to the body of letters.

Letter EA 330 is located at the British Museum.

== The letter ==
Letter 330 is short, the Obverse containing only 10 lines; the Reverse 11. Lines 1-8 of the Obverse is the letter introduction, with the message to the King (Pharaoh), starting at line 9, Obverse.

One distinction of the Introduction, many vassal state letters (from the city-states) use the phraseology: "7 and 7 times again, ... I bow down". (I address you (Pharaoh), over-and-over again.) In some Amarna letters, EA 64, EA 282, and this letter, EA 330, an addition is made to the cuneiform text, by adding the wording for "to flood", (Akkadian mīlu.) Namely "7 and 7 times again, over-flowing, ... I bow down". (Flooding (mīlu), is also used in EA 359, the King of Battle saga.)

== Cuneiform score (CDLI listing), Akkadian, English ==
Obverse
Paragraph I of II

segue
9. (P. II) Ù yi-di-mi _lugal_-ru
___U, – idû Ŝarru^{ru}
___And, – know _King_
10. _EN_-ia i-nu-ma
___Bēlu-ia, — enūma
___Lord-mine, — Now, (at this time)

Bottom
11.iš^{#}-te-mi gáb-bi
___šemû gabbu
___I heard all
12.[ a ]-wa-at, _lugal_-ri
___amatu, – _lugal_-ri
___the words (the report), – _King_^{ri}

Reverse

13. _EN_-ia, — ša-ni-tú
___ _Bēlu_-ia
___ _Lord_-mine
13.5----------ša-ni-tú a-mur-mi
___—————šanitam, —
___-------------Furthermore, — Look (here) –
14.
—-
—- ^{1}Yanhamu

== See also ==
- Tel Lachish
- Amarna letters–phrases and quotations
