= Amarna letter EA 282 =

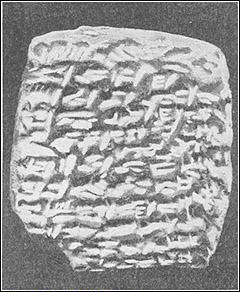
Unidentified Amarna letter, but equivalent line length and shape to EA 282

Amarna letter EA 282 is a relatively short ovate clay tablet Amarna letter, located in the British Museum, no. 29851.

The letter contains only 16 lines of cuneiform text, in Akkadian, with lines 12 to 16 covering half of the tablet's reverse. Of note, the scribe, though the tablet is unparagraphed, inscribed a line along the bottom of the front side below line 11; and likewise, at the start of the letter, a line is inscribed above the top of line 1, on the obverse. (See photo, Obverse: )

Letter EA 282 is from Šuwardata, of Qiltu (typical in the Amarna letters: the "Man-(LÚ), URU-Qiltu-(ki), the "Govern-or" or 'Man of the (URU)-City-(his)'), to the Pharaoh of Egypt, and is from one of the vassal states in Canaan. Visually, the tablet is ovate, with even the inscribed cuneiform signs having ovate form, almost over the entire letter. Consequently, though EA 282 is topical, and tells a story, its first appearance is more like a piece of art, rather than a "diplomatic letter" (correspondence). The identified older photo (pictured), also shows an art-like appearance. Most Amarna letters are much more standard, and like a text, though the many styles of letters, as well as clay-types, leads to dramatic differences in Amarna letter's visual appearances.

The Amarna letters, about 300, numbered up to EA 382, are a mid 14th century BC, about 1350 BC and 20 years later, correspondence. The initial corpus of letters were found at Akhenaten's city Akhetaten, in the floor of the Bureau of Correspondence of Pharaoh; others were later found, adding to the body of letters.

== The letter ==
=== Notes on the EA 282 ===
Typically an Amarna letter states the individual addressee (PN, personal name), addressor (PN), and the town/region they are from. Qiltu, the city/region of Šuwardata is not mentioned. In formulaic introductions, EA 282 has a very short formula, (with the addition of "over-flowing", "7 and 7 (times) over-flowing", rare in the Amarna letters). A number of letters also use the "on the front, and on the back", making this letter 2 extra lines in length. Otherwise, EA 282 is approximately the shortest letter possible, stating: Persons, formulaic introduction, statement of position, and need for continued Archer-troop aid/Pharaonic support.

=== EA 282: "Alone" ===
One of eight letters from Šuwardata A translation from 1982, Biblical Archaeologist magazine:

(Line 1) "To (the) king, my lord,
(2) (my) god, and my sun.
(3) thus (says-(speaks)) Šuwardata, [ your -ARDU-ma, "The Servant"] Servant
(4) 7 and 7 (times), "over-flowing", I have fallen
(5) at the feet-(s), 1. "King-Lord-mine",
(6) (and)="Both" on (my) stomach -(Upon Arriving!)
(7) And (on my back!) -(Upon Departing!)
(8) May the "King-
(9) -Lord-mine" be aware, (that) I, (am) alone!.
(10) Let (the) "King-
(11) -Lord-mine" send (me) Archers (Egyptian pitati)
(12-Reverse)
(12-Reverse) (in) great number
(13) and, save me!
(14) : (–gl–) "let him save me!" ("get me out")
(15) and, (=So), may 1. "King-
(16) -Lord-mine" know. -EA 282, Obverse and Reverse, lines 1-16, complete

The cuneiform signs, (with some Akkadian words):

(Line 1) a-na, 1 LUGAL-(=Šarru)-ri, EN-(="bēlu", Lord)-ia,
(2) dingir-meš-nu ù dingir-UTU-(Sun God)-ia
(3) um-ma Yi-Šu-Ar-Da-Ta (Šuwardata) ARDU-(=Servant)-ma-(The)
(4) 7 ù 7 (times), mi-la, ma-aq-ta-ti (maqātu)
(5) a-na GÌR-(šēpu, foot)-meš 1. "LUGAL-ri-EN-ia"
(6) ù ka-ba-tu-ma
(7) ù ṣú-ú-ru-ma
(8) le-el-ma-ad "LUGAL-ri
(9) -EN-ia" a-na-ku 1.-EN ba-ša-ti
(10) [yu-(=pi)] yu-uš-ši-ra "LUGAL-ri-
(11) -EN-ia" ERIM-(army)-meš-pí-ta-ti
(12-Reverse)
(12-Reverse) ma-a'-ad ma-gal
(13) ù [yi-(=pi)] yi-ki-im-ni
(14) : (–gl–) [ya-(=ia)] ya-ṣí-mi
(15) [yi-(=pi)] yi-[il]-ma-ad "LUGAL-ri-
(16) -EN-ia"

== List of Šuwardata's 8-letters ==
1. EA 278—title: "As ordered (4)"
2. EA 279—title: "A wasteland"
3. EA 280—title: "Lab'ayu redevivus"
4. EA 281—title: "Rebellion"
5. EA 282—title: "Alone"
6. EA 283—title: "Oh! to see the king.
7. EA 284—title: "The powerful hand of the king"

and from the later corpus:

1. EA 366—title: "A rescue operation"

== See also ==
- Glossenkeil (Amarna letters)
- Amarna letters–phrases and quotations
