= Mur (cuneiform) =

Akkadian language sign

Cuneiform áš.

— (Right part of sign)

— (Left part of sign)

Mur (cuneiform), and Har (cuneiform), most common uses in Epic of Gilgamesh; also Hur (cuneiform)

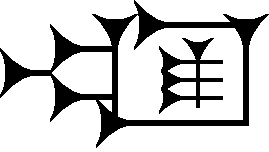
the right side of the mur/har sign enclosed (The right side, (shown enclosed), is the cuneiform sign for– áš, and used for áš, and ÁŠ, in the Epic of Gilgamesh.)

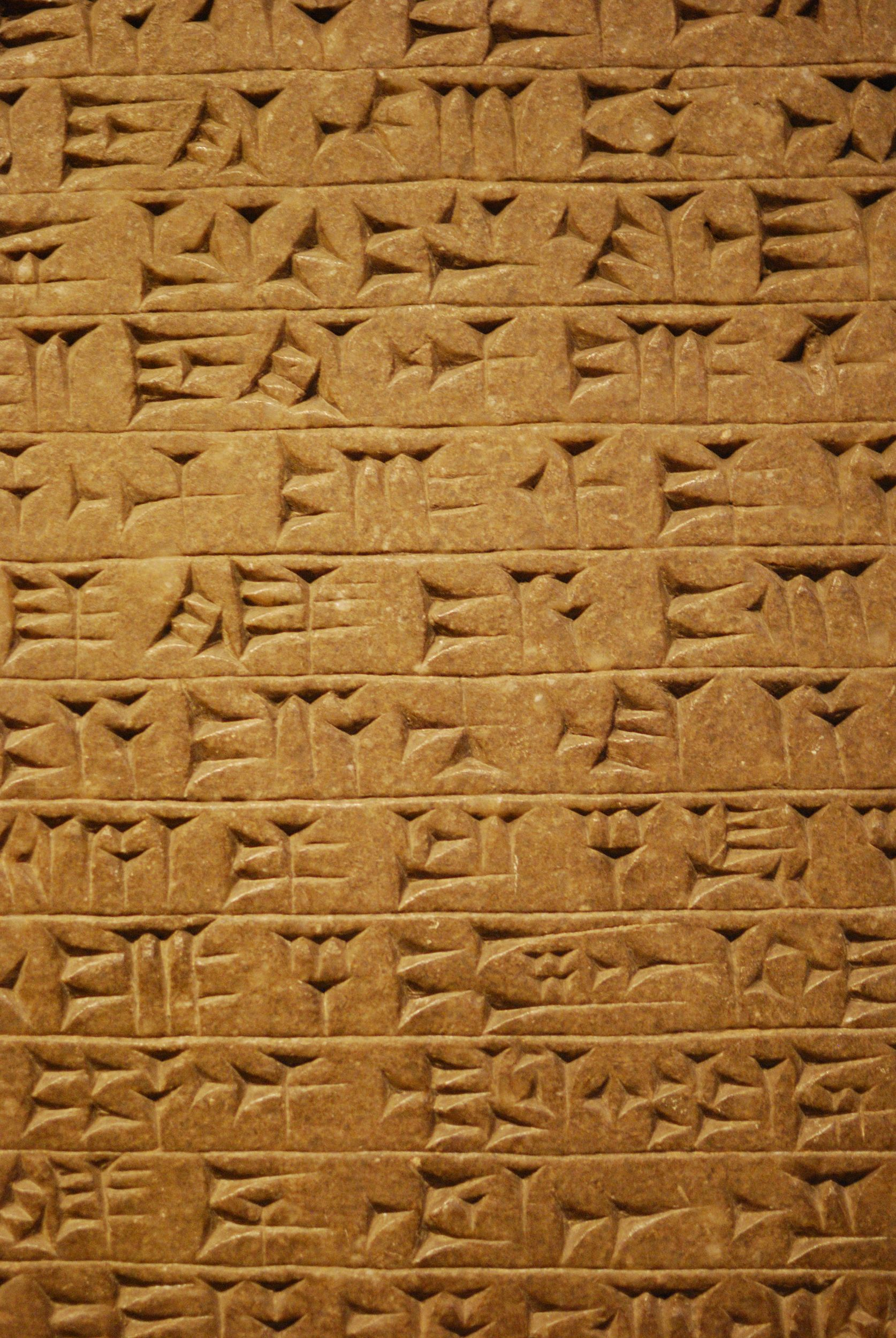
Line 5, 2nd cuneiform character from left (?har, or ?mur (cuneiform))

The cuneiform sign mur, (also the har, hur, hír sign), is a common-use sign of the Amarna letters, the Epic of Gilgamesh, and other cuneiform texts (for example Hittite texts).

Linguistically, it has the alphabetical usage, for consonants in texts for h, r, or m, and also a replacement for the four vowels of a, e, i, or u. The sign can also be used syllabically for the h-r variants, or for mur (used especially for Akkadian amāru, for "to see"), and an example letter of the Amarna letters being Amarna letter EA 289.

== Epic of Gilgamesh usage ==
The mur sign usage in the Epic of Gilgamesh is as follows: (har, 40 times, hír, 1 time, hur, 18 times, and mur, 27 times. And for the logogram HUR, 2 times.

== Jerusalem scribe usage, EA 287, EA 288, EA 289 ==
The Jerusalem scribe used mur (cuneiform) in EA 287-289. The usage is an exclamatory, at sentence starts (an interjection). The spelling in the Akkadian language, for the scribe is a (cuneiform)-(mur (cuneiform)), as the Akkadian word being referenced as an "Exclamation", and is "Amāru–!", (for "to see"), and in the English language is approximately — "Look (here)–!". In some cases, like EA 288, the Jerusalem scribe uses it two lines apart, lines 41 and 43, of the letter Reverse.

The lines: (EA 288, Reverse)

41. a-mur ^{1=diš}tu-ur-ba-zu gaz(GAZ^{#}) d[e_{4}-k]a-(dâku)
___amāru–! — ^{1=diš}Turbazu gaz(GAZ^{#}) d[e_{4}-k]a-(dâku)
___Look (here)–! — Turbazu "killed"-!
42. i-na abul(KÁ.GAL) alu(IRI^{#}) sí-lu-ú^{ki} qa-al šarru(LUGAL)^{ru}
___ina abullu ālu Silu^{ki} ga-al šarru(LUGAL)^{ru}
___in city-gate city Silu^{ki}, "tragedy"?, King^{ru} (Phar.)
43. a-mur ^{1=m(male)=diš}zi-im-ri-da alu(IRI) la^{#}-ki^{#}-si^{ki}
___amāru–! — ^{1=m(male)=diš}Zimredda ālu(IRI) Lachish^{ki}
___Look (here)–! — ^{m}Zimredda city Lachish
