= Amarna letter EA 364 =

Ancient clay tablet with cuneiform writing

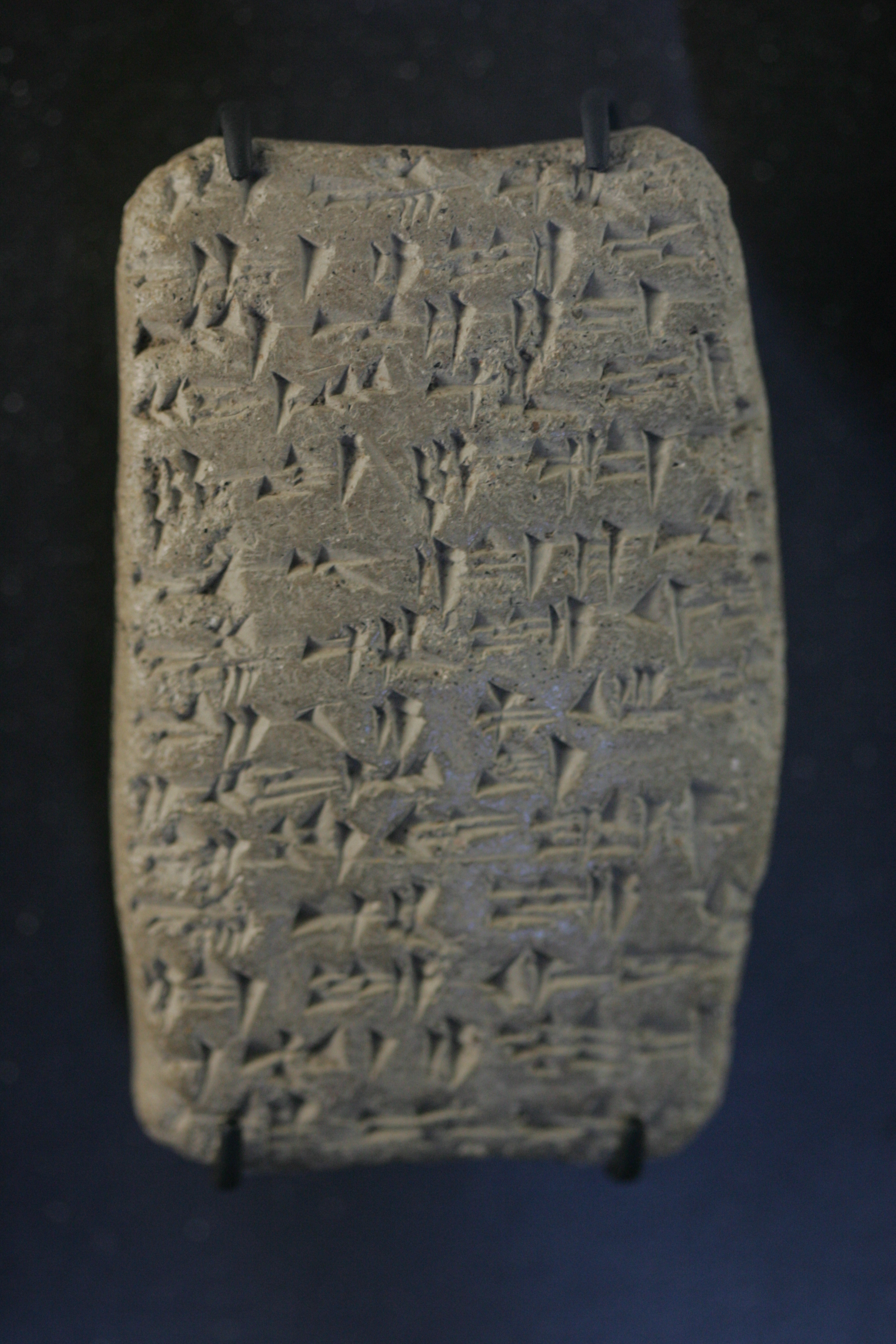
- Material: Clay
- Length: 5.8 centimeters
- Height: 10 centimeters
- Width: 1.9 centimeters
- Created: c. 1350 BC
- Present location: Louvre Museum, Ile-de-France, France
- Language: Akkadian

Amarna letter EA 364, titled Justified War, is a clay tablet letter from Ayyab to Pharaoh Amenhotep IV.

It is one of the Amarna letters, 382 in total, dating from c. 1360 – c. 1332 BC. The initial corpus of letters were found at the city of Amarna, founded by Amenhotep IV, in the floor of the Bureau of Correspondence of Pharaoh.

The letter is a reply to the pharaoh referring to a letter from the pharaoh's messenger Tahmassi. In it, Ayyab, governing-man (often—("who/which"-(ša))-"man, city")-Aštartu, who is in control of one of the city-states in Canaan, is stating his commitment to guarding the city (and the region), after three cities in the region were taken in attacks by Habiru raiders.

The tablet measures about 4 in x 2.3 in and is in relatively pristine condition. Because of its narrowness, each line averages only between 4 and 7 cuneiform characters in Akkadian.

Glossenkeils used in letter 364:

Amarna letter EA 364	EA 364 Glossenkeil	EA 364 Akkadian language	translation
Amarna letter EA 364	Glossenkeil #1 line 8, Obverse	a-pa-ru	dust for("DUST and dust"); Sumerogram & Akkadian

== Text ==
The following English text, and Akkadian is from Rainey, 1970, El Amarna Tablets, 359-379:

(Line 1)--To the "King, my Lord",
(2)--thus (speaks) Ayyab
(3)--your servant: at
(4)--the feet of my lord
(5)--7 times (and) 7 times
(6)--I have fallen down. I am the servant
(7)--of the "King, my Lord", "And"--[ "and"=Ù (omitted by Rainey)]
(8)--("and") the dust of(at?) (i.e. beneath)-(dust= SAHAR / : (–gl–) -(a-pa-ru)-("And-("dust-and-dust")")) ( )

i.e.((7.7-8))--("And-("dust-and-dust")")

(9)--(at/beneath)-his two feet.
(10)--I have obeyed (lit.: heard) the message
(11)--of the "King, my Lord",
(12)--to me from
(13)--the hand of Atahmaya.
(14)--I will still guard
(15)--very diligently
(16)--[the land]s of the "King, my Lord".
(end photo obverse)

(17)--Furthermore, see!
(18)--the king of Hasora
(19)--has occupied (taken)
(20)--3 towns from me!
(21)--On the day that I heard (of it), I commanded (!)
(22)--to commence hostilities
(23)--against them
(24-25)--until the "King, my Lord" may be apprised.
(26)--And may the "King, my Lord",
(27)--take counsel
(28)--concerning his land.

Akkadian:

(Line 1)--a-na LUGAL EN-[ ia ]
(2)--um-ma A-iYa-aB
(3)--ARAD-ka a-na!
(4)--GÌR.MEŠ EN-ia
(5)--7-šu 7-ta-an
(6)--am-qut a-na-ku
(7)--LUGAL EN-ia Ù-(Rainey omitted)
(8)--SAHAR // : (–gl–) a-pa-ru....(also used in Amarna letters–𒃵--see EA 147 )
(9)--2 GÌR.MEŠ-šu
(10)--[eš_{15}(=is)]-(=eš)-te-mé ša-par
(11)--LUGAL EN-ia
(12)--a-na ia-ši i-na
(13)--qa-ti ^{I}A-TaH-Ma-iYa
(14)--a-di aṣ-ṣur-[ mi ]
(15)--[ ma ]-gal [ ma ]-[ gal ]
(16)--[ KUR ].MEŠ LUGAL EN-[ ia ]
(end photo obverse)

(17)--ša-ni-tam a-mur
(18)--URU-Ha-Sú-Ra
(19)--il-te-qé
(20)--3 URU-^{didli.ki} iš-tu [ ia ]-ši
(21)--i-na UD aš-mé ù [ a ]-ma-[ ru ]
(22)--i-pé-eš_{15} nu-kùr-ti
(23)--i-na šu-a-šu
(24)--a-di-mi li-di-mi
(25)--LUGAL EN-ia
(26)--ù LUGAL EN-ia
(27)--li-im-lu-uk-mi
(28)--a-na ARAD-šu

== Letter EA 364, Moran translation ==
Moran's non-linear letter English language translation (translated from the French language):

EA 364, Obverse:

(Lines 1-9)--"To the king, my lord: Message of Ayyab, your servant. I fall at the feet of my lord 7 times and 7 times. I am the servant of the king, my lord, ("and"-omitted) the dirt- : (–gl–) (dirt) ((i.e. dust & dust)) at his feet.
(lines 10-16)--I have heard what the king, my lord, wrote to me through (='by the hand', qa-ti ) Atahmaya. Truly, I have guarded^{1} very carefully (ma-gal ma-gal) [the citie]s^{2} of the king, my lord.

EA 364, continued Bottom, Reverse:

(lines 17-28)--Moreover, (ša-ni-tam) note that it is the ruler of Haṣura who has taken 3 cities from me. From the time I heard and verified this,^{3} there has been waging of war against him. Truly, may the king, my lord, take cognizance, and may the king, my lord, give thought to his servant."--(complete EA 364, with minor lacunae, lines 1-28)

== Selected cuneiform signs in EA 364 ==
=== Sign "tah" ===
Often personal names (PN) contain special cuneiform characters, and Tahmassi's name, spelled "Atahmaya"-(~Ptah is Mine) is an example of such. Sign "tah" (based on the more common "qab"-"GABA"-) can be seen in line 13—^{I}A-TaH-Ma-iYa. (In the photo of EA 364 (obverse), the cuneiform signs become out-of-focus below lines 9 and 10.) The "tah" sign has only one use, as tah, in the Epic of Gilgamesh, (12 times).

Because the name Tahmassi's comes from the Egyptian god Ptah (a creator god), the origin of the spelling and pronunciation of "ptah" can be guessed. "Ptah-mine", Ptah (is) mine, "Mine, My (God) is Ptah", with -iya the suffix for 'my' still used in the languages of present day.

=== Variants of EN, for "Lord" ===
The "en" cuneiform sign, is used frequently in the Canaanite city-state letters to the Pharaoh for "Lord", (as EN (lord Sumerogram)), for Akkadian language bēlu. It is often part of the phrase "King-Lord-mine", LUGAL-EN-ia; a variant often in the letters (because of the addendum of an RI sign) contains an equivalent for LUGAL, "ŠÀR", for (LUGAL=king=Šarru), "ŠÀR-RI, EN-ia". Also, singly "Lord-mine" is used in some letter texts, and often with alphabeltic spellings of "bēlu" instead of using "EN": in EA 364, (above)–line (end l.3) and 4 state: "...at feet 'Lord(EN)-mine' ".

In letter EA 364, the common variety of many sub-varieties is used,. It shows distinctly in lines 364:1,4,7, and 11 the two verticals-right, with the angled wedges at their base. The lone vertical at center-left is equally tall (not on all Amarna letters), and strikingly visible, and without the angled wedge at the base. Some letters have an additional wedge at the base (making it the 3rd, 'vertical-with-wedge-base').

== See also ==
- Ayyab
- Glossenkeil (Amarna letters)
- Amarna letters–phrases and quotations
- List of Amarna letters by size
  - Amarna letter EA 5, EA 9, EA 15, EA 19, EA 26, EA 27, EA 35, EA 38
  - EA 153, EA 161, EA 288, EA 364, EA 365, EA 367
