= Zimredda =

Zimredda may refer to:

- Zimredda of Lachish, author of one of the Amarna letters
- Zimredda of Sidon, author of two the Amarna letters; he is part of the subject of the later Rib-Hadda letters, and figures subsequently
