= ARAD (Sumerogram) =

Cuneiform sign

Hittite version of ARAD-(ÌR) and the common cuneiform sign usage in the Amarna letters.

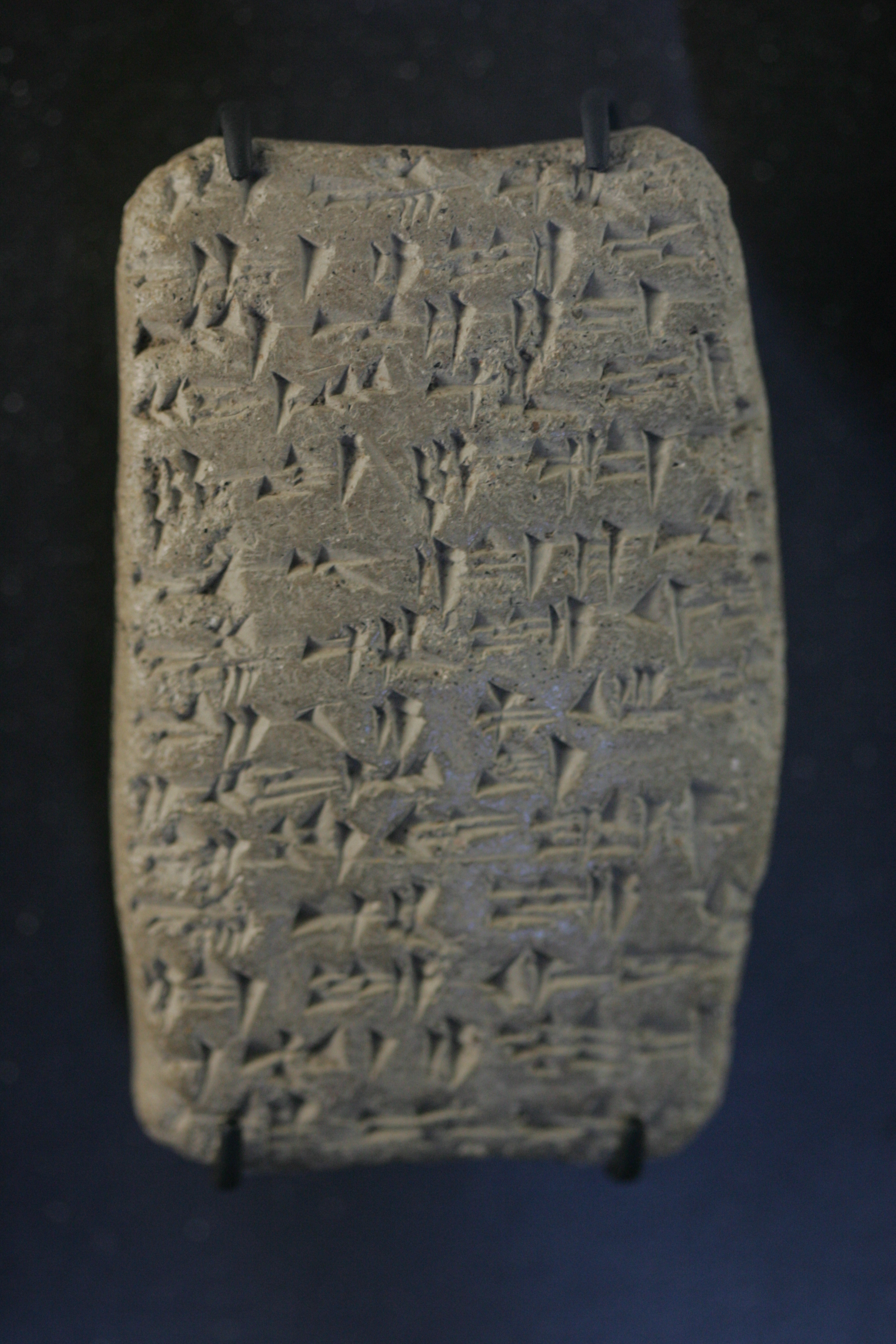
EA 364, from Ayyab. Line 3: "ardu-ka"-("Servant-yours" at, (line 4)-feet-yours, Lord-mine). (very high-resolution expandable photo)

ARAD, (also ÌR or NITÁ) is the capital letter-(majuscule) Sumerogram for the Akkadian language word "ardu", for servant. It is used especially in the introduction to the Pharaoh: for example "To King, Lord-mine (of Gods(pl)-mine, Sun-god-mine), message thus Xxxxxx, "Servant-yours"-(271). It is also used extensively in Amarna letter texts, the author, usually the "man of a city", (or scribe), where there is a constant reminder that he is a "servant", or "servant-yours"-(of the Pharaoh). Many letters are giving city-state status reports, but many are also requesting help with the Egyptian army troops-(Archers (Egyptian pitati), supplied by the Pharaoh).

== Epic of Gilgamesh ==
The cuneiform character for ARAD, ÌR, and NITÁ: in the Epic of Gilgamesh is used in the following numbers: ARAD-(2), ÌR-(2), and NITÁ-(2) times. It is used numerous times in the Amarna letters but especially from the city-states of Canaan-(Ki-Na-Ha-A-(-Ha-) in the letters-(EA 30:1, for example)).

== See also ==
- Amarna letter EA 364
