= Nuribta =

Nuribta, also Nuribda, was a city, or city-state, located in the vicinity of Magiddo in Israel, in historical Canaan during the time of the Amarna letter correspondence, a 15 to 20 year period from about 1350 to 1335 BC.

The majority of the Amarna letters were written to the pharaoh of Ancient Egypt and the only reference to Naribta is a letter by Biridiya of Magidda, EA 365, entitled: "Furnishing corvée workers", (EA is for 'el Amarna').

== A letter of corvée work ==
=== EA 365, Biridiya letter no. 7 of 7: "Furnishing corvée workers" ===
Say [to the ki]ng-(i.e. pharaoh), my lord and my [Su]n: Message of Biridiya, the loyal servant of the king. I fall at the feet of the king, my lord and my Sun, 7 times and 7 times.
May the king, my lord, take cognizance of his servant and his city. In fact, only I am cultivating: ah-ri-šu in Šunama-(Shunem), and only I am furnishing corvée workers. But consider the mayors that are near me. They do not act as I do. They do not cultivate in Šunama, and they do not furnish corvée workers. Only I– ia_{8}-hu-du-un-ni (by myself) furnish corvée workers. From Yapu they come, from [ my] resources here, (and) from Nuribta. And may the king, my lord, take cognizance of his city. —EA 365, lines 1-31 (complete)

== See also ==
- Corvée
- Biridiya
- Megiddo (place)
- Amarna letters–localities and their rulers
- Amarna letter EA 365
