= Gi (cuneiform) =

Cuneiform sign

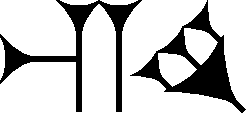
Cuneiform for ge, gi, and GI; digitized form.

Hittite cuneiform for ge, gi, and GI.

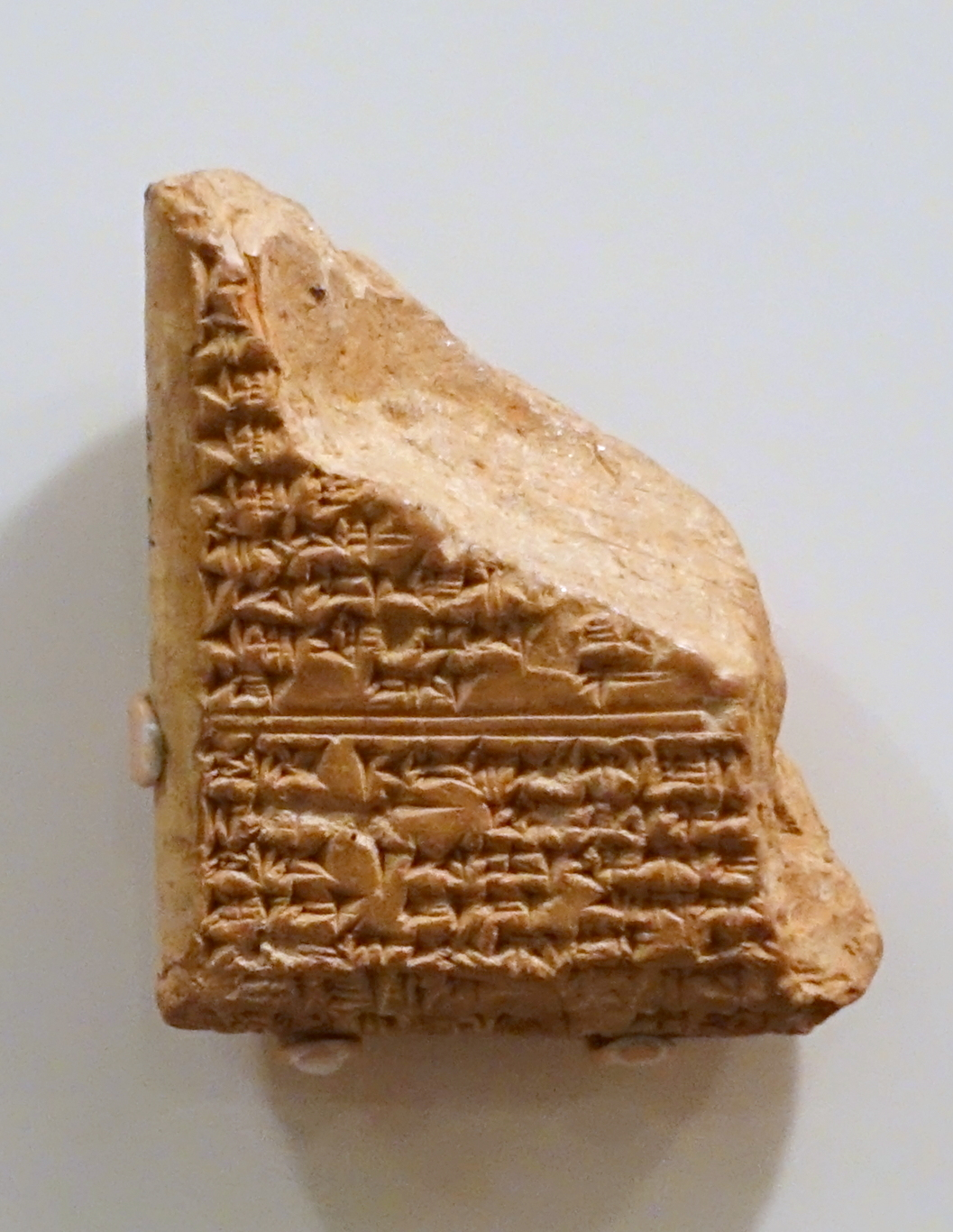
EA 26, fragment (Obverse). (high-resolution expandable photo) (Last flat-surface 5-lines on fragment (Para IV), lines 30–34. (An Amarna letter that uses gi.)

The cuneiform gi sign is a common multi-use sign of the Epic of Gilgamesh, the 1350 BC Amarna letters, and other cuneiform texts. It also has a sumerogrammic usage for GI in the Epic of Gilgamesh. The structure of the cuneiform sign is like its twin, Zi (cuneiform),.

The "gi" sign has the syllabic usage for ge and gi, and a sumerogram usage for GI. Alphabetically "gi" can be used for g ("g" can be interchanged with "k", or "q"); and "gi"/"ge" can be used for i, or e. In Akkadian, all 4 vowels, a, e, i, u are interchangeable with each other.

== Epic of Gilgamesh usage ==
The gi sign usage in the Epic of Gilgamesh is as follows: ge-(4 times); gi-(17), GI-(20 times).
