= Kur (cuneiform) =

Cuneiform sign

Cuneiform sign for kur.

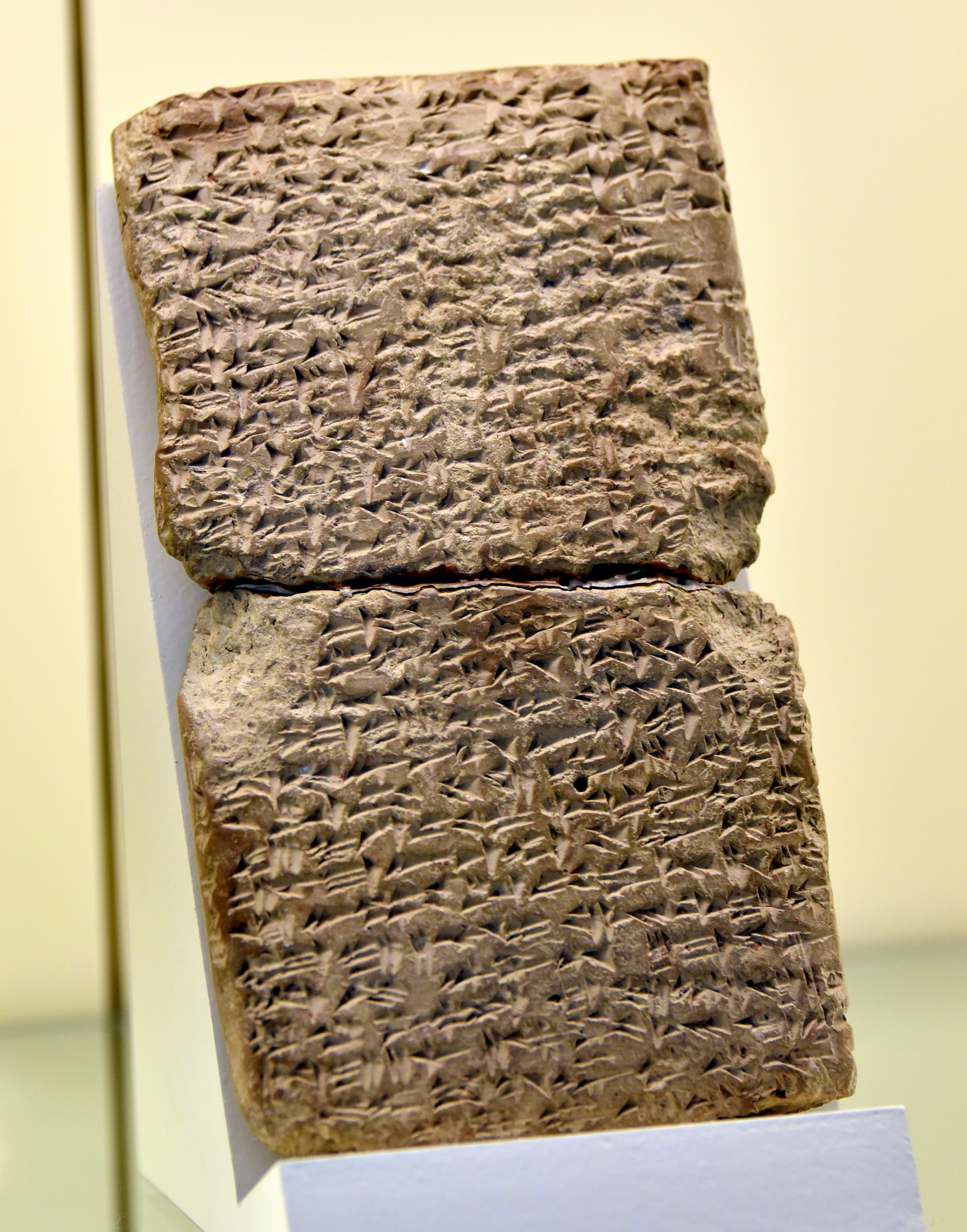
Amarna letter EA 288-(reverse), Abdi-Heba to Pharaoh, "Benign Neglect". Usage in Lines 35, 36, 50, 53, and 55; text reads left-to-right. (very high resolution, expandible photo)

The cuneiform kur sign, (in cuneiform: 𒆳; as Sumerogram, KUR), has many uses in both the 14th century BC Amarna letters and the Epic of Gilgamesh. It is routinely and commonly used to spell the Akkadian language word "mātu", for "land", "country"; also possibly "region". In EA 288, a letter from the Abdi-Heba, the Governor of Jerusalem, the kur sign is used eight times.

The alphabetic/syllabic uses and Sumerograms of the 'kur' sign from the Epic of Gilgamesh:

gìn
kur
lat
laț
mad
mat
šad
šat
GÌN (Sumerogram)s
KUR
MAD

Its usage numbers from the Epic of Gilgamesh are as follows: gìn-(1), kur-(5), lat-(18), laț-(1), mad-(2), mat-(52), šad-(6), šat-(13),PA-(11), pa-(209), GÌN-(10), KUR-(72), MAD-(5). In the Amarna letters, an example usage is from EA 288 (Reverse), l. 35, defeated LAND-(kur) Nahrima.
