= Bi (cuneiform) =

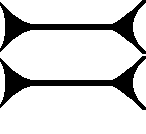
Cuneiform sign for bi, pí; also in the Epic of Gilgamesh, bé, gaš, kaš, and sumerogram, KAŠ, for "beer".

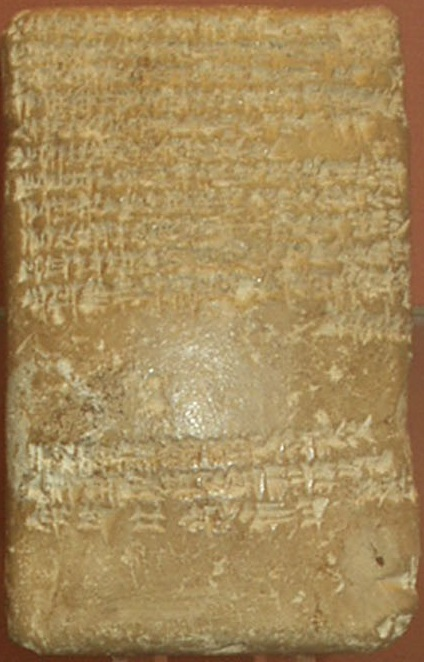
Amarna letter EA 9-(Reverse), Burra-Buriyaš to Pharaoh, "Ancient Loyalties, New Requests". Last line: 'a series of gifts' "...I send (to) you." ("...ul-te-bi-la..x-x.") (Akkadian language, "abālu", to bring, carry) (photo, out-of-focus)

The cuneiform bi sign, also pí, and used for other syllabic forms, as well as a sumerogram, is a common use syllabic and alphabetic cuneiform sign used in both the mid-14th century BC Amarna letters and the Epic of Gilgamesh. In the Amarna letters, it is sometimes used for the spelling of the archers (Egyptian pitati), 'pí-t(x)-t(x)', an often requested need from the Pharaoh in the vassal state sub-corpus of the letters.

As a sumerogram, (capital letter (majuscule)), sign bi is used for KAŠ, Akkadian language for "šikāru", beer.

The following linguistic elements for bi are used in the Epic:

bé
bi
gaš
kaš
pí
KAŠ, sumerogram: "beer"

The bi sign's usage numbers in the Epic of Gilgamesh are as follows: bé-(25 times), bi-(190), gaš-(1), kaš-(12), pí-(2), KAŠ-(1).

== Amarna letters usage ==
=== Use of pí, Egyptian archers ===
The archers were part of the Egyptian army, and often requested by the Canaanite vassal city-states, when writing to the Pharaoh in the Amarna letters. They were named the pitati, Akkadian language "piṭātu", "troops of soldiers", and spelled in a variety of ways, often starting with the bi sign as pí.

A partial listing of spellings of "ERIM.MEŠ-pitati", by Amarna letter:

- EA 86, 86:7--pí-ṭa-ti
- EA 282, 282:11--pí-ṭa-ti
- EA 290, 290:20--pí-ṭa-ti
- EA 296, 296:34--pí-ṭa-ti
