= Hal (cuneiform) =

Cuneiform sign

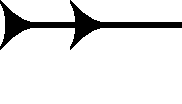
Cuneiform hal, common in Epic of Gilgamesh, and some Amarna letters.

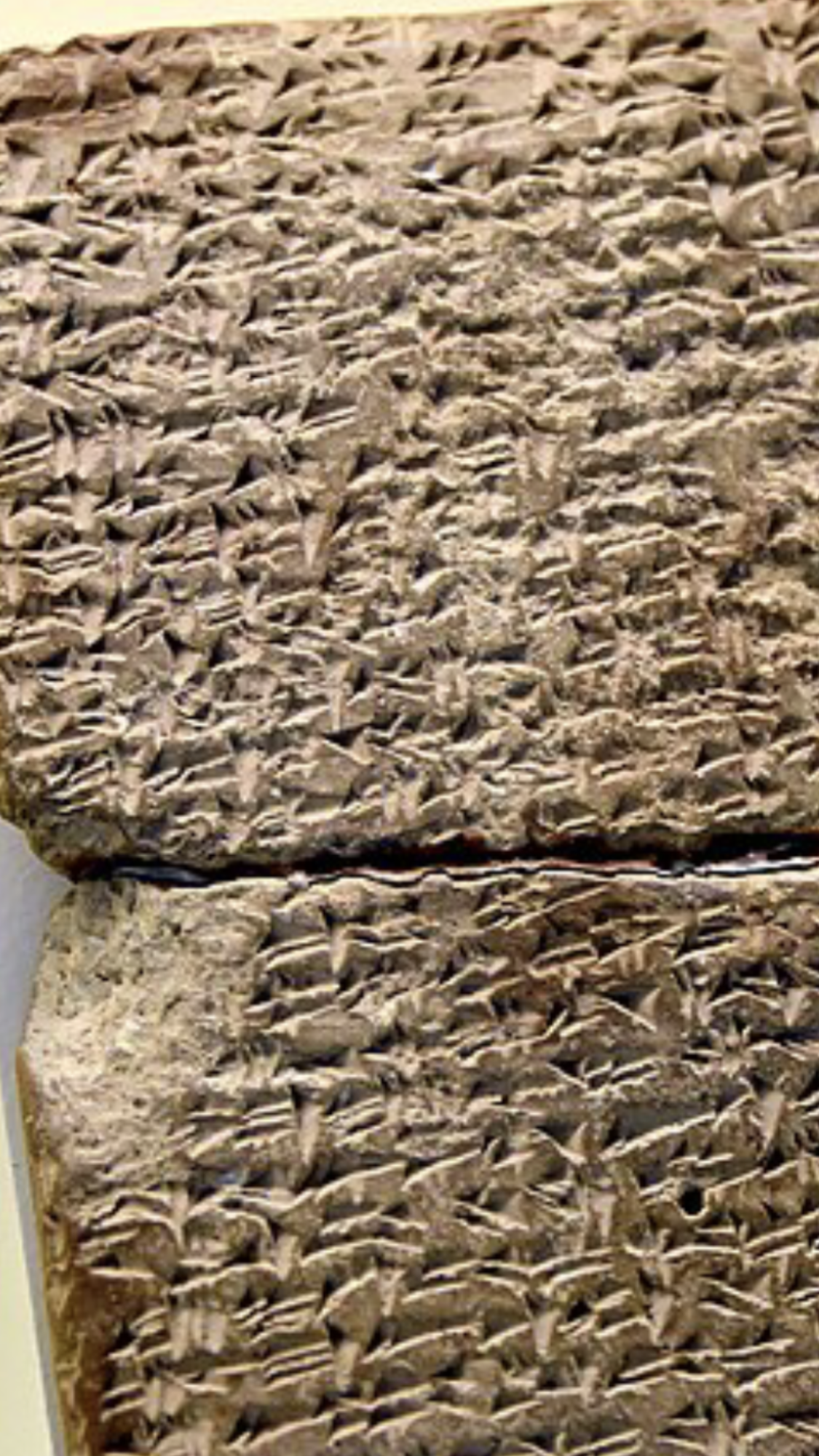
Section of Amarna letter EA 288, (Reverse) showing usage of cuneiform hal. (Near beginning of last 2 lines) For spellings of Akkadian halāqu, "over-taken" towns; usage of six places on EA 288 Reverse, and once on Obverse. (Shown, lines 55 and 56, on Reverse)

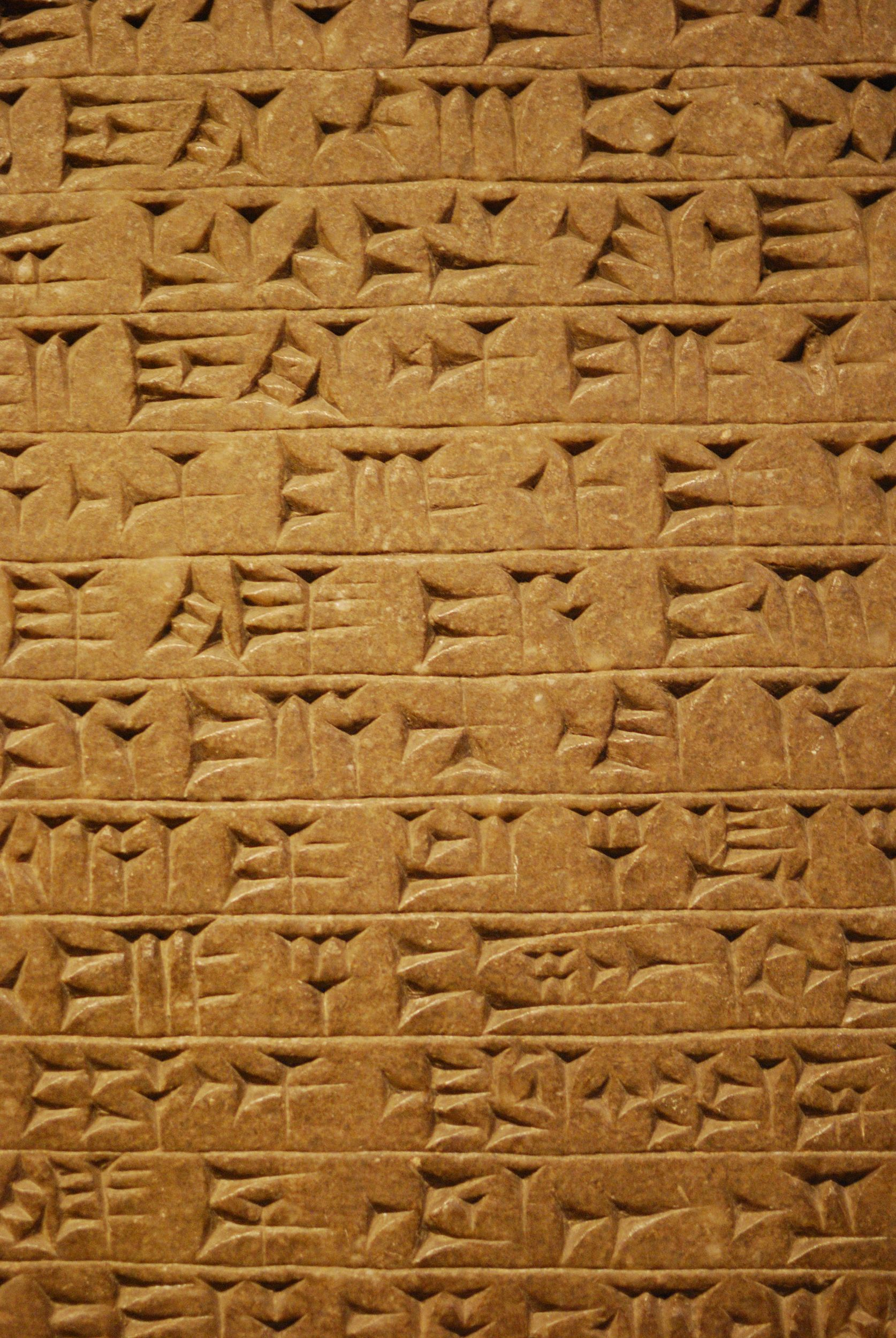
Cuneiform hal, 10th row, cuneiform character, no. 4 (of 5).

The cuneiform sign hal, is a common-use sign in the Epic of Gilgamesh, the Amarna letters, and other cuneiform texts, for example Hittite texts. Its common usage is syllabic for hal, but could also be use for alphabetic h or l, or the a, and for the other three vowels of e, i, or u.

== Epic of Gilgamesh usage ==
Cuneiform hal has a single usage in the Epic of Gilgamesh, for hal. The usage is: hal, 11 times.

In the Epic of Gilgamesh, the most common usage of hal, at the beginning of words spelled "hal-" in the glossary, is for Akkadian halāqu, English, to disappear, to cause to be lost; in the Amarna letters it is used to refer to city-states, or towns, lost to the Hapiru.

In the Epic, two other words use hal at the beginning of their spellings, halbu, for English forest, three times in the Epic, Tablets VII, IV, and II. One spelling of halāpu, (English, "to clothe"), of four spellings, uses hal, Tablet IV, line 196, ú-hal-lip.

== Amarna letters usage ==
One main usage in the Amarna letters, is for the Akkadian language word halāqu, referring to the capturing of city-states, or towns, (Amarna letter EA 288).
