= Ba (cuneiform) =

Cuneiform sign

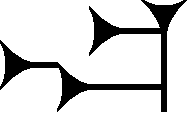
Cuneiform ba. (digitized form ba, and other meanings)

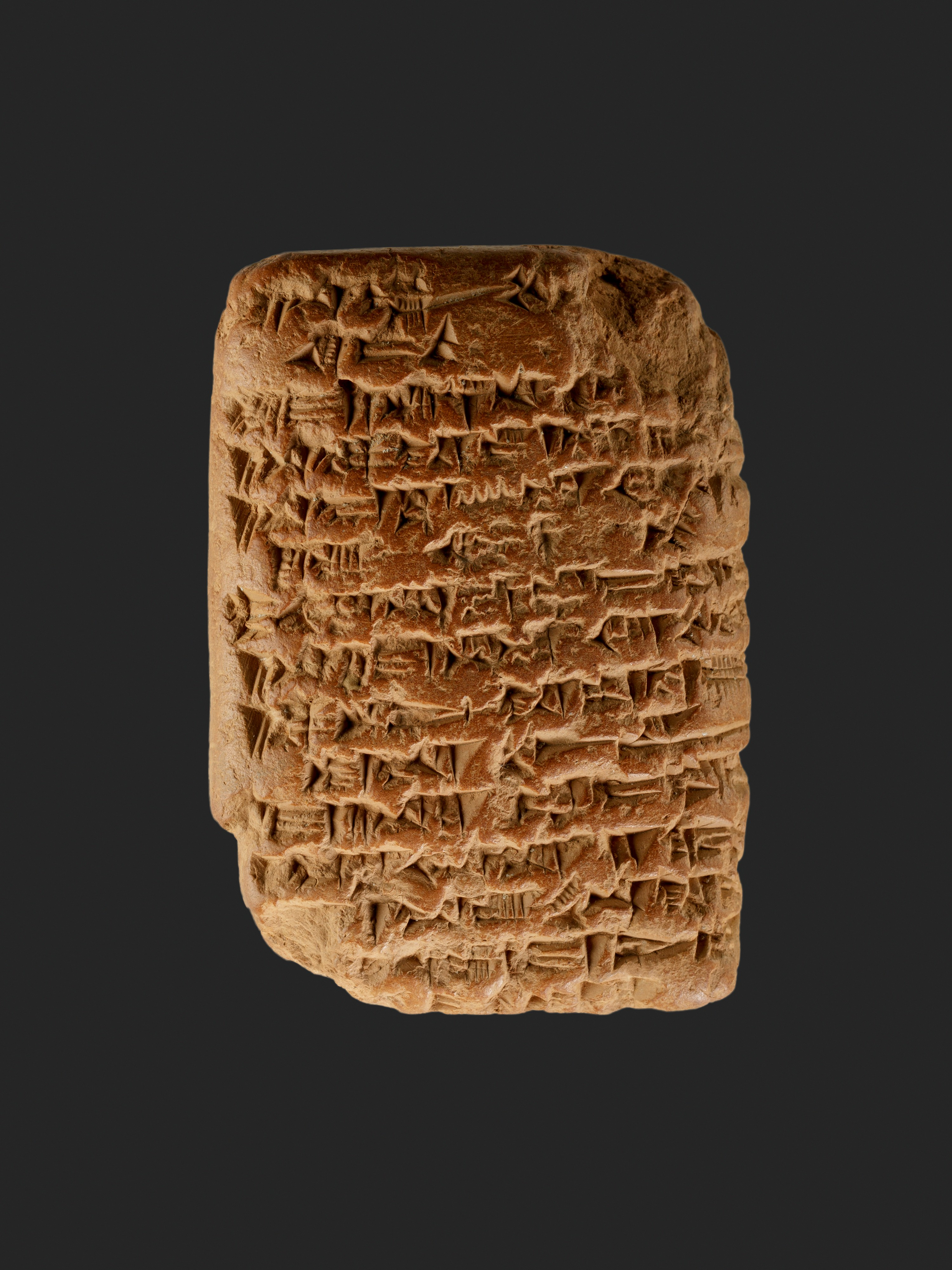
Amarna letter EA 15-(titled: "Assyria joins the International Scene"). A common Amarna letter that uses cuneiform ba. (Third from last cuneiform sign, line 9.)

The cuneiform sign ba, is a common-use sign of the Amarna letters, the Epic of Gilgamesh, and other cuneiform texts (for example Hittite texts).

Linguistically, it has the alphabetical usage in texts for b, a, or syllabically for ba, and also a replacement for "b", by "p". The a is replaceable in word formation by any of the 4 vowels: a, e, i, or u.

== Epic of Gilgamesh usage ==
The ba sign usage in the Epic of Gilgamesh is as follows: ba-(282 times); BA-(7).
