= Ru (cuneiform) =

Cuneiform sign

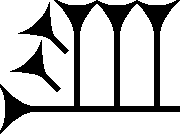
Cuneiform ru, but also (Epic of Gilgamesh), šub, šup, and as Sumerogram ŠUB

Hittite form of ru (used commonly in the Amarna letters).

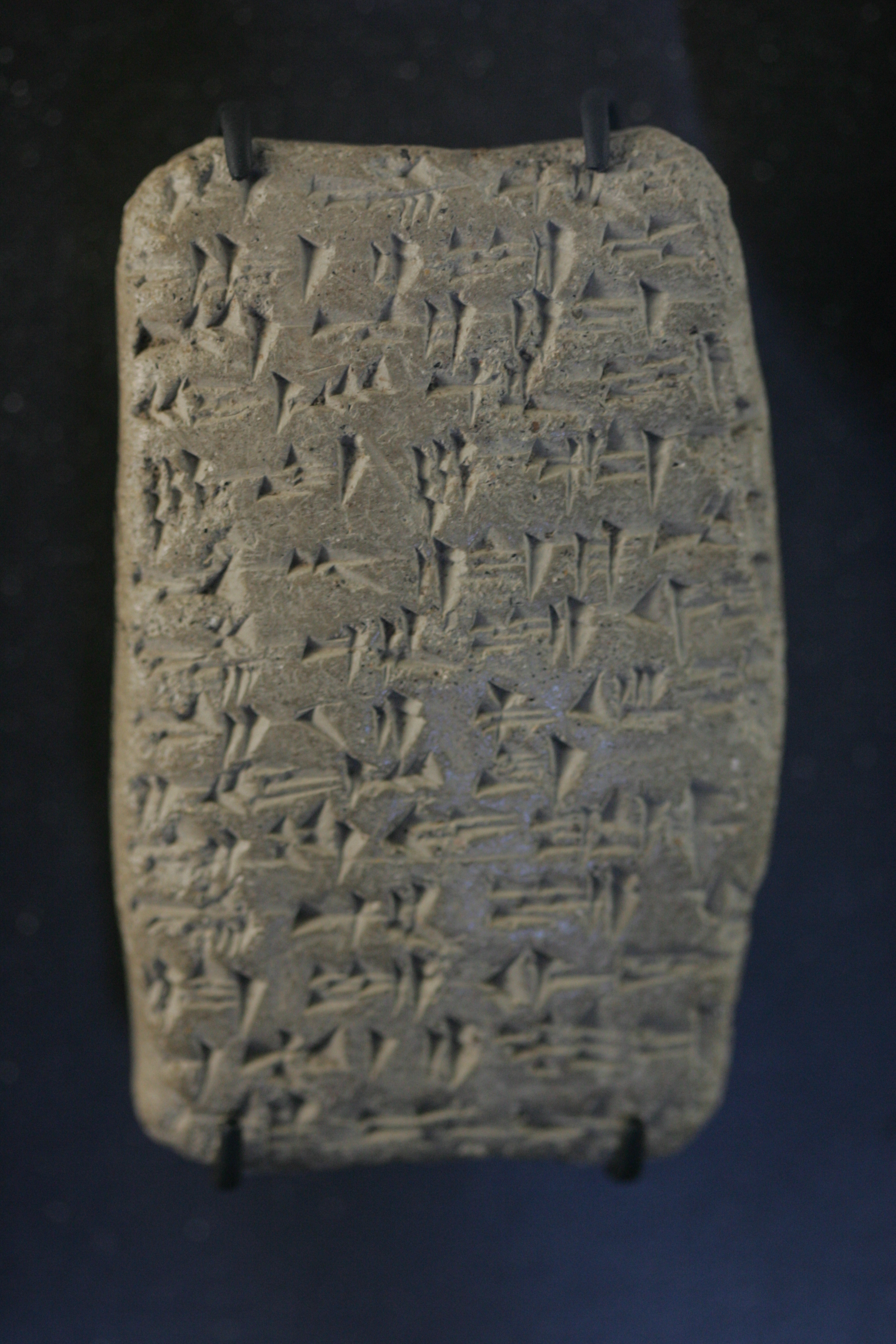
Amarna letter EA 364, Ayyab to Pharaoh. In Line 8, the final character (5th) is ru; the line translates as "SAHAR-(a Sumerogram, (="Iš (cuneiform)", =dust) and a-pa-ru- " (Akkadian='eperu', "dust"): (Line 7.9)..."and... (line 8) dust and dust, (line 9) (at) 2 feet-yours."-(the Pharaoh) (high resolution, expandible photo)

The cuneiform ru sign is found in both the 14th century BC Amarna letters and the Epic of Gilgamesh. As ru it is used for syllabic ru, and alphabetic 'r', or 'u'. In the I-XII Tablets of the Epic of Gilgamesh, it has specific uses showing alternate renderings besides ru; as sign no. 068, ru, 250 times, šub, 6, šup, 3, and as Sumerogram ŠUB, 1 time. In the Amarna letters, the sign is mostly used for ru, r, and u in the spelling of various words. Notably, for "bird", Akkadian language "iṣṣūru", in Amarna letter EA 28, (Tushratta to Pharaoh), titled "Messengers Detained and a Protest"; the messengers are referenced as "uncaged" birds, and "aren't they free to come and go as birds do?".

The scribal rendering of the ru sign is dramatically different in some of the Amarna letters. In Amarna letter EA 15, Assur-uballit I of Assyria to Pharaoh, and Amarna letter 28, (using bird, "iṣṣūru") it appears as the standard, electronic rendition.

The alternate rendition of the sign as shown in Amarna letter EA 364 is also found twice in the mid-length (to long) 69-line Amarna letter EA 362, Rib-Hadda to Pharaoh, used as "to send" (a letter/message), line 52, "aš-pu-ru", Akkadian "šapāru".

Another example letter of usage, is for one line, Line 27 on the obverse of Amarna letter EA 147, Biridiya to Pharaoh, titled "A Hymn to the Pharaoh", a letter in pristine condition (minus a missing corner of the clay tablet).

Of note, in the Akkadian language, using vowels a, e, i, and u, there is no "o", (or y as vowel). Any vowels used in a sign, can be interchangeably substituted for a different vowel. Also u (cuneiform) has special uses, and is only rarely used for the 'vowel u'. The ú (cuneiform)-(first prime) is the typical alphabetic 'u'.

== Aziru, of Amurru ==
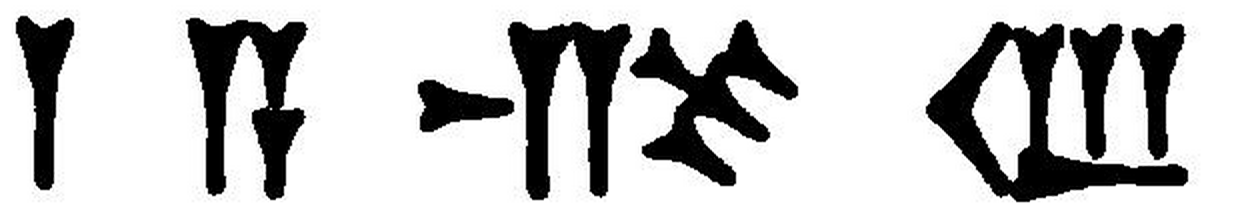
Amarna letter EA 161, line 2: "message (speaking thus) ': 1. A-zi-ru, servant-yours" (Individual (1.) + 3 cuneiform characters, A, zi, ru.)

Aziru was allowed to leave Egypt and return to his kingdom of Amurru. Aziru had, however, made secret contacts with the Hittite king Suppiluliuma I, and sometime upon his return to Amurru, he permanently switched his allegiance to the Hittites to whom he remained loyal until his death. Henceforth, Amurru remained firmly in Hittite hands until the reign of the 19th dynasty Pharaohs Seti I and Ramesses II.
