= Zimredda of Lachish =

Zimredda (fl. c. 1340 BC) was a leader of Lachish in the mid 14th century BC. He is mentioned in the Amarna letters, and is the author of EA 329, (EA for 'el Amarna'). Only two other references are made to "Zimredda of Lakiša"–(Lachish) in the corpus. He is part of the subject of letter EA 333, titled: "Plots and disloyalty" . His death is reported in EA 288 by Abdi-Heba–(letter no. 4 of 6), at the hands of the Habiru.

In the Amarna letters correspondence, from 1350-1335 BC, the mayor of Lachish was Sipti-Ba'lu, author of letters EA 330-332.

== "Zimredda of Lakiša" letter--no. 329 ==
Title: Preparations under way. EA 329, lines 1-20 (complete)

To the king, my lord, my god, my Sun, The Sun from the sky: Message of Zimreddi, the ruler of Lakiša, your servant, the dirt at your feet. I prostrate myself at the feet of the king, my lord, the Sun from the sky, 7 times and 7 times. As to the messenger of the king, my lord, whom he sent to me, I have listened to his orders very carefully, and I am indeed making preparations in accordance with his order.

== See also ==
- Zimredda of Sidon
- Amarna letters
