= At (cuneiform) =

Akkandian language glyph

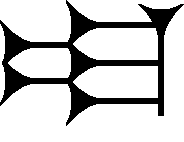
Cuneiform at; also ad, aṭ, and AD.

The cuneiform sign at, is a common-use sign of the Amarna letters, the Epic of Gilgamesh, and other cuneiform texts (for example Hittite texts). It has secondary uses in the Amarna letters for "ad".

Linguistically, it has the alphabetical usage in texts for a, (also the 4 vowels, a, e, i, u), and t, and d.

== Epic of Gilgamesh usage ==
The at sign usage in the Epic of Gilgamesh is as follows: (ad, 17 times, at, 107, aṭ, 15, and AD, 15 times).

== Gallery ==
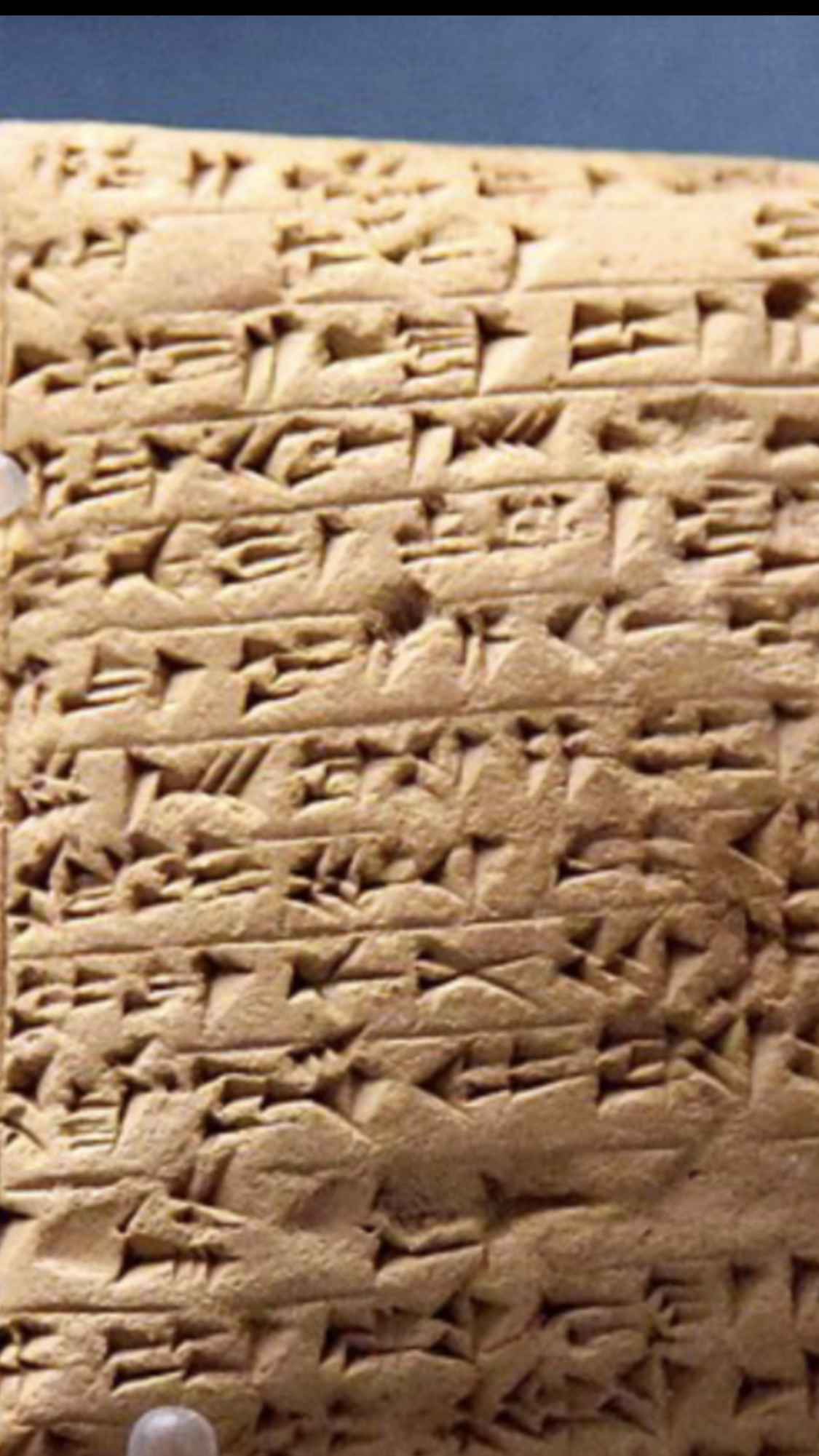
ṣabātu, (sa-ab-ta-at-mi3), using at (cuneiform), line 12 (last full line (in cropped photo), of 15 lines on Obverse) ṣabātu = (English, "to seize, capture")
