= TI (cuneiform) =

Cuneiform sign

Cuneiform TI sign

Cuneiform TI or TÌL (Borger 2003 nr.; U+122FE 𒋾) has the main meaning of "life" when used ideographically. The written sign developed from the drawing of an arrow, since the words meaning "arrow" and "life" were pronounced similarly in the Sumerian language.

With the determinative UZU 𒍜 "flesh, meat", ^{UZU}TI, it means "rib". This homophony is exploited in the myth of Ninti (𒊩𒌆𒋾 NIN.TI "lady of life" or "lady of the rib"), created by Ninhursag to cure the ailing Enki. Since Eve is called "mother of life" in Genesis, together with her being taken from Adam's צלע tsela` "side, rib", the story of Adam and Eve has sometimes been considered to derive from that of Ninti.

In Akkadian orthography, the sign has the syllabic values di or ṭi, in Hittite ti, di or te.

== Tu-Ta-Ti writing study tablets ==
See TU-TA-TI scribe study tablets (Cuneiform)

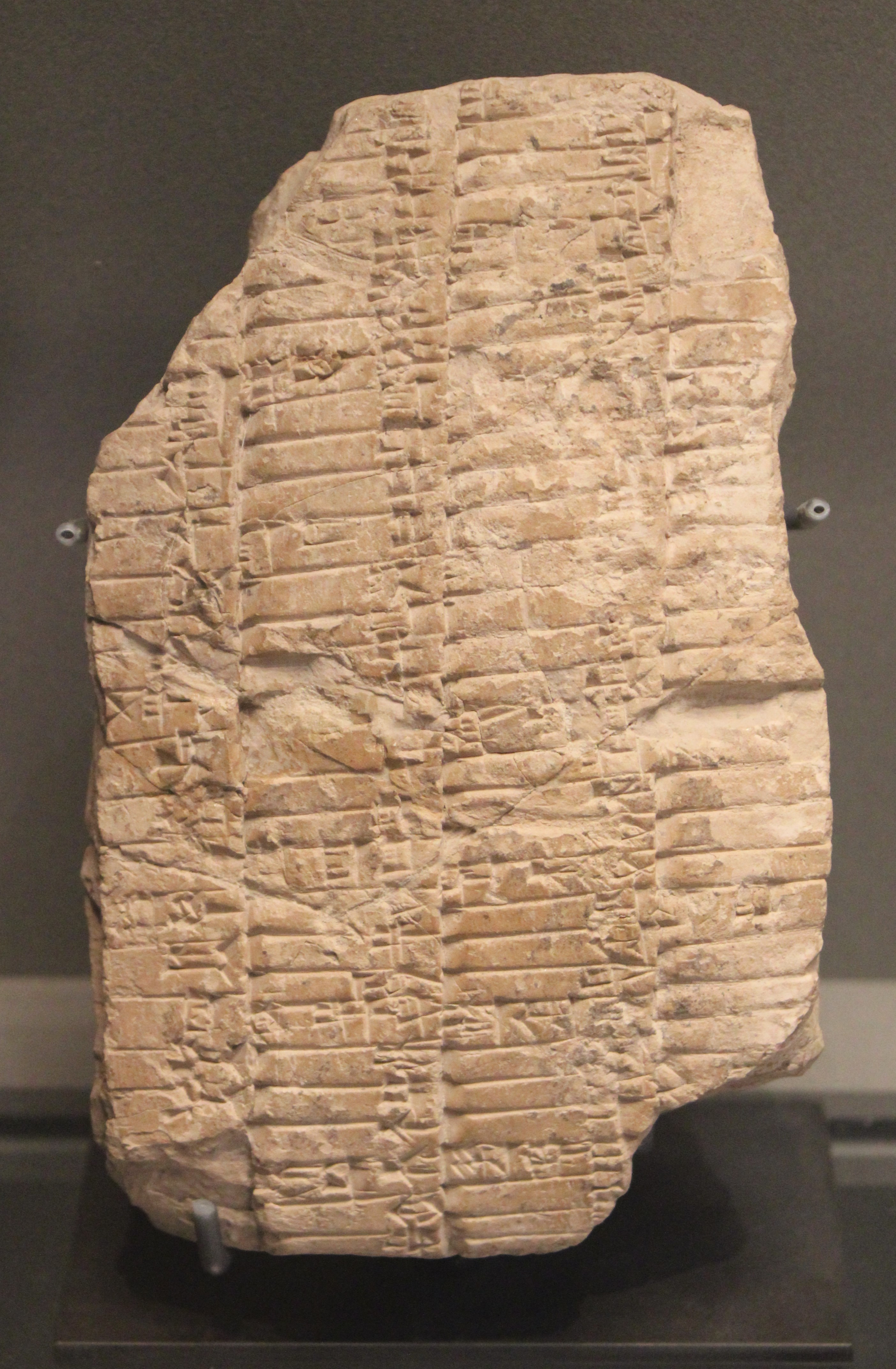
TA-TU-TI scribe study tablet Artifact AD AO 5399 now found in the Louvre museum]. Old Babylonian period, c. 1800-1700 BC.

Instructional tablets for teaching scribes with the same text have been found all over Mesopotamia, in Nippur, and many other places.

The text originated in an ancient Sumerian writing exercise, beginning with the signs TU, TA, and TI, and then a word built of these three signs TU-TA-TI, then NU, NA, and NI, and so forth, presumably to be read aloud in class while practicing to write. These tablets were divided in two, with the left side having the teacher's instructional text, while the right side was left blank for the student to practice, repeatedly writing and erasing it. This "TU-TA-TI" instructional text was studied in all the languages that used Cuneiform and found in the archaeological remnants of many cultures.

== Amarna letters and Epic of Gilgamesh usage ==
The twelve tablet (I-XII) Epic of Gilgamesh uses the ti sign as follows (Parpola): ti (387 times), and TI (the Sumerogram), (2 times). In the Epic, Sumerogram TI is used for the Akkadian language word "balāṭu", for "life; to live", as "TI.LA", in one location, Tablet XI 174, (and replacement in two locations, also as TI.LA in Tablets X, and XI).

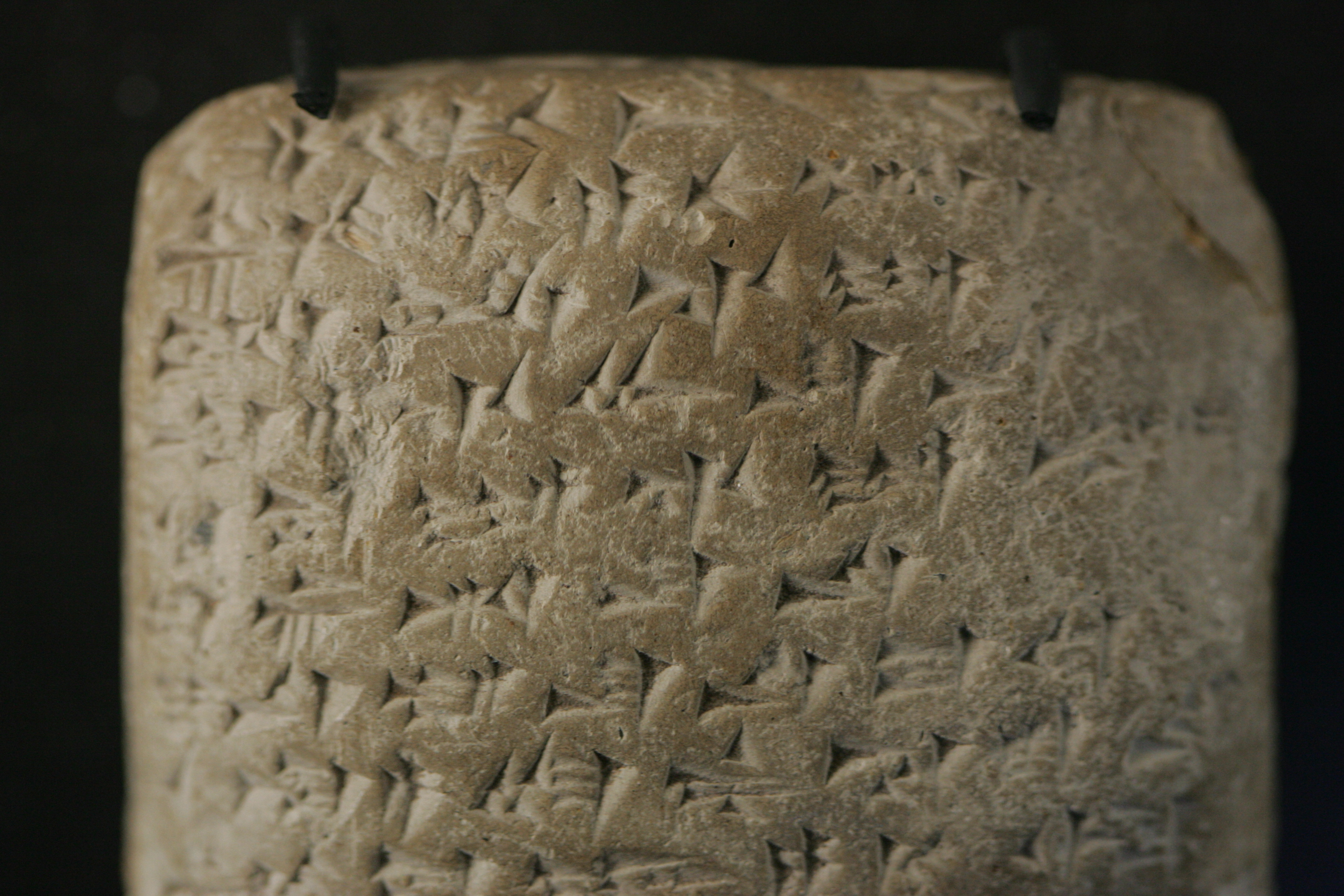
Amarna letter EA 365 (reverse, top half), Biridiya to Pharaoh, (subject corvee labor, and townsites: Shunama, Yapu, and Nuribta). The "alphabetic" ti sign is used in the 3rd and 4th lines from the top (lines 17 and 18). (high resolution, expandible photo)

For the mid 14th century BC Amarna letters, letter EA 365 authored by Biridiya, harvesting in ^{URU}Nuribta, ti is used for "ti", and "ṭi". For example, on the reverse of EA 365, subject of corvee labor, harvesting, lines 17 and 18 translate as follows:

(other city-governors): "(17) who, are with me (18) are not 'performing' (doing) (19) as I. They are not (20) harvesting..."

(the city rulers): "(17) ša it-ti-ia (18) la-a(=NOT) ti-pu-šu-na..."
