= Zi (cuneiform) =

Cuneiform sign

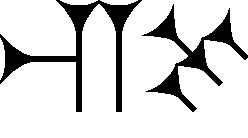
Cuneiform for ze, zi, and ZI; digitized form.

Old Assyrian cuneiform for ze, zi, and ZI.

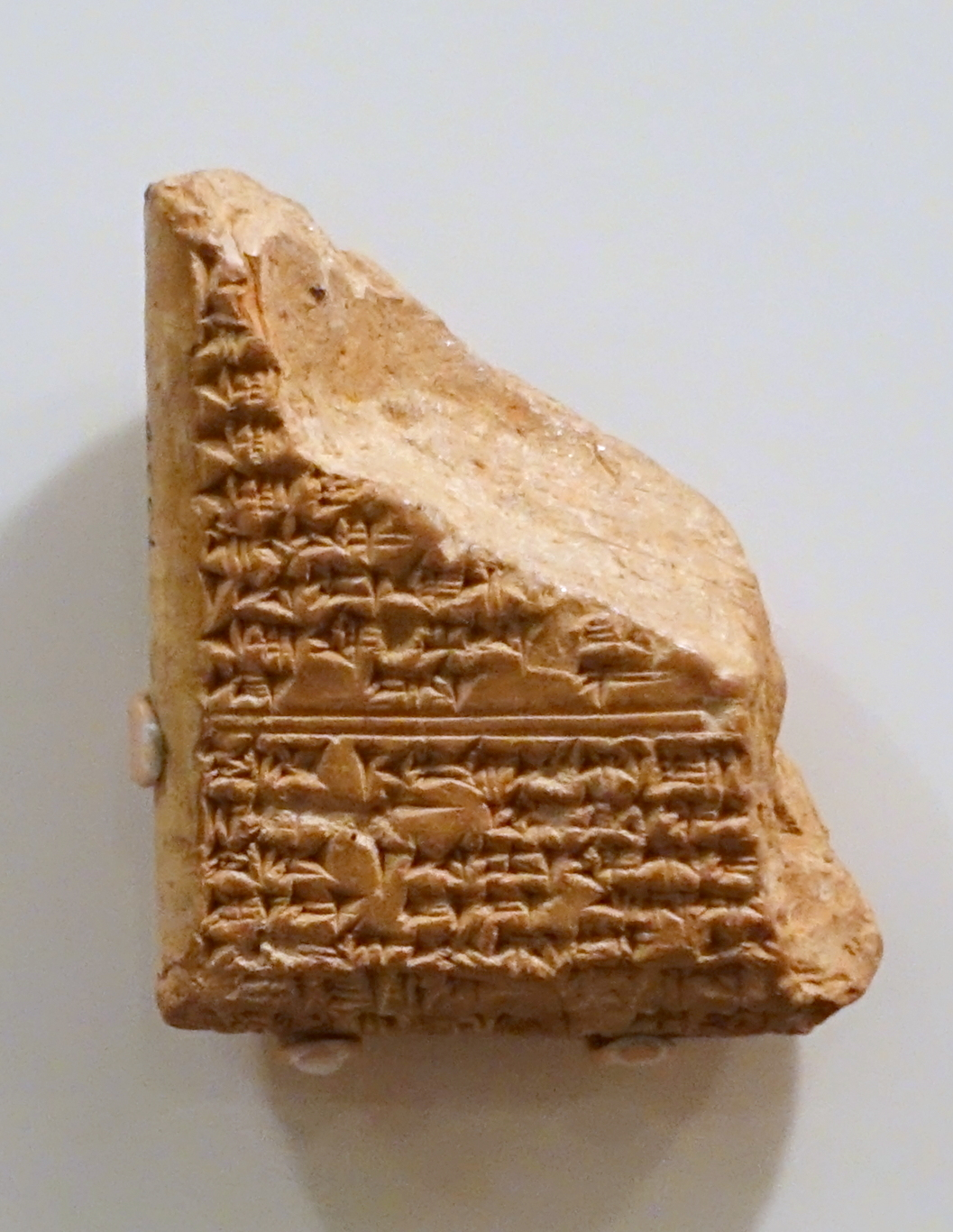
EA 26, fragment (Obverse). (high-resolution expandable photo) (Last flat-surface 5-lines on fragment (Para IV), lines 30–34. (An Amarna letter that uses zi.)

The cuneiform zi sign is a common multi-use sign of the Epic of Gilgamesh, the 1350 BC Amarna letters, and other cuneiform texts. It also has a sumerogrammic usage for ZI in the Epic of Gilgamesh. The structure of the cuneiform sign is like its twin, Gi (cuneiform),.

The "zi" sign has the syllabic usage for ze and zi, and a Sumerogram usage for ZI. Alphabetically "zi" can be used for z ("z" can be interchanged with any "s"); and "zi"/"ze" can be used for i, or e. In Akkadian, all 4 vowels, a, e, i, u are interchangeable with each other.

== Epic of Gilgamesh usage ==
The zi sign usage in the Epic of Gilgamesh is as follows: ze-(6 times); gi-(46), ZI-(32 times).
