= Pítati =

Contingent of Nubian archers in Ancient Egypt

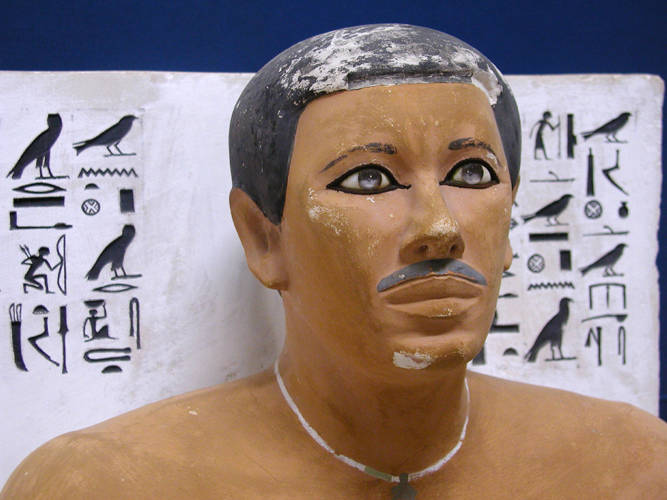
Rahotep, a superintendent of the military, and military supplies, including archers–(Note Archer hieroglyph, and quiver hieroglyph). (Superintendent-(overseer): is ‘Emir’, represented by the Owl above mouth hieroglyphs, for "m-r", 'emeer'.)

The Pitati (Egyptian: 𓌔𓏏𓏭𓂡 pḏ.tj, Cuneiform: 𒁉𒋫𒋾 piṭāti) were a contingent of Nubian archers of ancient Egypt that were often requested and dispatched to support Egyptian vassals in Canaan. They are recorded in the correspondence of the 1350 BC Amarna letters, and were often requested to defend against the Habiru, also rogue vassal-kings and foreign troops of neighboring kingdoms (for example, Hatti), who were on the attack.

The vassal cities and "city-states" were constantly requesting the services (protection) of the Pharaoh's armies, by means of this "archer-army" force, basically garrison forces. A request for lodging, and preparations of food, drink, straw, and other supplies required, is often demanded by the pharaoh, for a small, or a large contingent.

The pitati archer force were mercenaries from the southern Egyptian "land of Kush" (named Kaša, or Kaši in the letters).

The first use of Nubian mercenaries was by Weni of the Sixth Dynasty of Egypt during the Old Kingdom of Egypt, about 2300 BC.

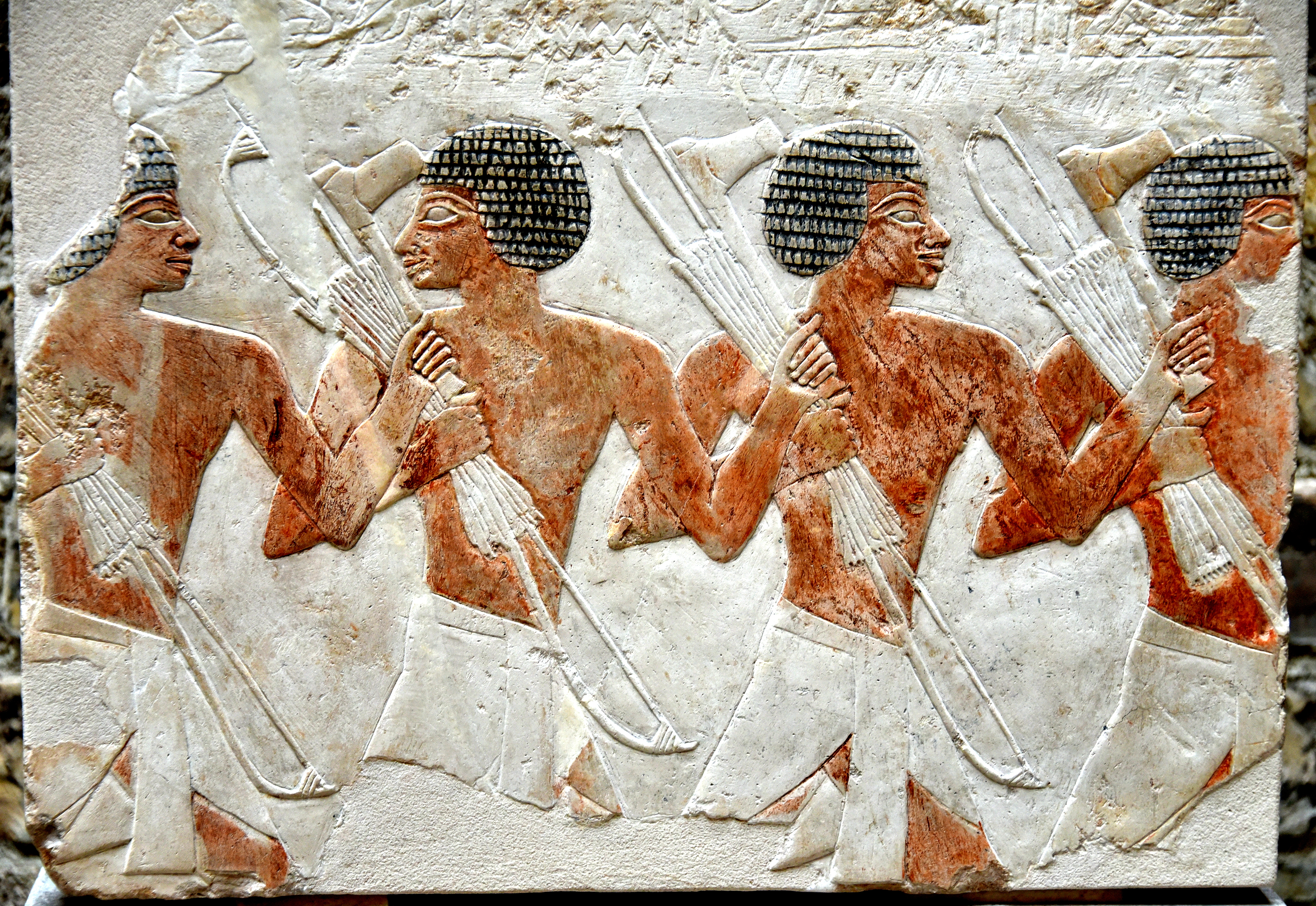
A group of Egyptian soldiers and Nubian mercenaries holding axes, bows, and quivers of arrows. From the mortuary temple of Hatshepsut at Deir el-Bahari, c. 1470 BCE. Neues Museum, Berlin

== A letter example--no. 337 ==
A vassal–state letter example from Hiziru, a "mayor", often referred to as the "Man (Lugal) of the City", in ancient Palestine is EA 337, entitled "Abundant supplies ready". The letter is short and undamaged:

Say to the king, my lord, my Sun, my god: Message of Hiziru, your servant. I fall at the feet of the king, my lord, 7 times and 7 times. The king, my lord, wrote to me, "Prepare the supplies before the arrival of a large army of pí-ta-ti of the king, [m]y l[ord]." May the god of the king, my lord, grant that the king, my lord, come forth along with his large army and learn about his lands. I have indeed prepared accordingly abundant supplies before the arrival of a large army of the king, my lord.

The king, my lord, wrote to me, "Guard Maya," the commissioner of the king, my lord. Truly. I guard Maya very carefully. -EA 337, lines 1-30 (complete)

== "Archers and myrrh" ==
Letter no. 3 of 5 by Milkilu of Gazru (modern Gezer):

Say to the god, my king, my lord, my Sun: Message of Milkilu, your servant, the dirt at your feet. I fall at the feet of the god, my king, my lord, my Sun, 7 times and 7 times. I have heard what the king, my lord, wrote to me, and so may the king, my lord, send the archers to his servants, and may the king, my lord send myrrh for medication. -EA 269, lines 1-17 (complete)

== Analysis ==
Part of the debate in analyzing the army-archer-force is whether the army just annually accompanied the pharaoh's commissioner or envoy and were then extracting tribute, or whether the archer-force duty was strictly military, and in support of the Egyptian borderlands control and influence. The short time period of the Amarna letters, 15–20 years, (17?), may give an answer to the influence of the archer-forces.

== See also ==
- Letters from Yidya, (EA 325)
