= Amarna letter EA 12 =

Amarna letter EA12 is a correspondence written to the King of Egypt by a princess of Babylonia.

A scribe named Kidin-Adad is mentioned within the letter.

This letter is part of a series of correspondences from Babylonia to Egypt, which run from EA2 to EA4 and EA6 to EA14. EA1 and EA5 are from Egypt to Babylonia.

During 1888 the Vorderasiatisches Museum received part of the tablet as part of a group of artifacts given to the museum by J.Simon. A second part of EA12 was given to the museum by Felix von Niemeyer.

The letter, translated by W.L. Moran, reads:

(1–6) Speak to my lord; thus the princess: To you, your ch[ariot]s, the [m]en and [your house] may it be well.

(7–12) May the gods of Burraburiash go with you. Go safely and in peace go forward, see your house.

(12–22) In the pre[sence of my lord], thu[s,] I [prostrate myself], saying, “Since G[...] my envoy has brought colored cloth, to your cities and your house, may it be ‹w›ell. Do not murmur in your heart and impose darkness on me.”

Your servant, Kidin-Adad, is located with me(?), as the substitute of my lord, I would verily go.

== See also ==
- Amarna
- Amarna letters: EA1, EA2, EA3, EA4, EA5, EA6, EA7, EA8, EA9, EA10, EA11
- Chronology of the ancient Near East
