= Amarna letters =

Egyptian archive of correspondence on clay tablets

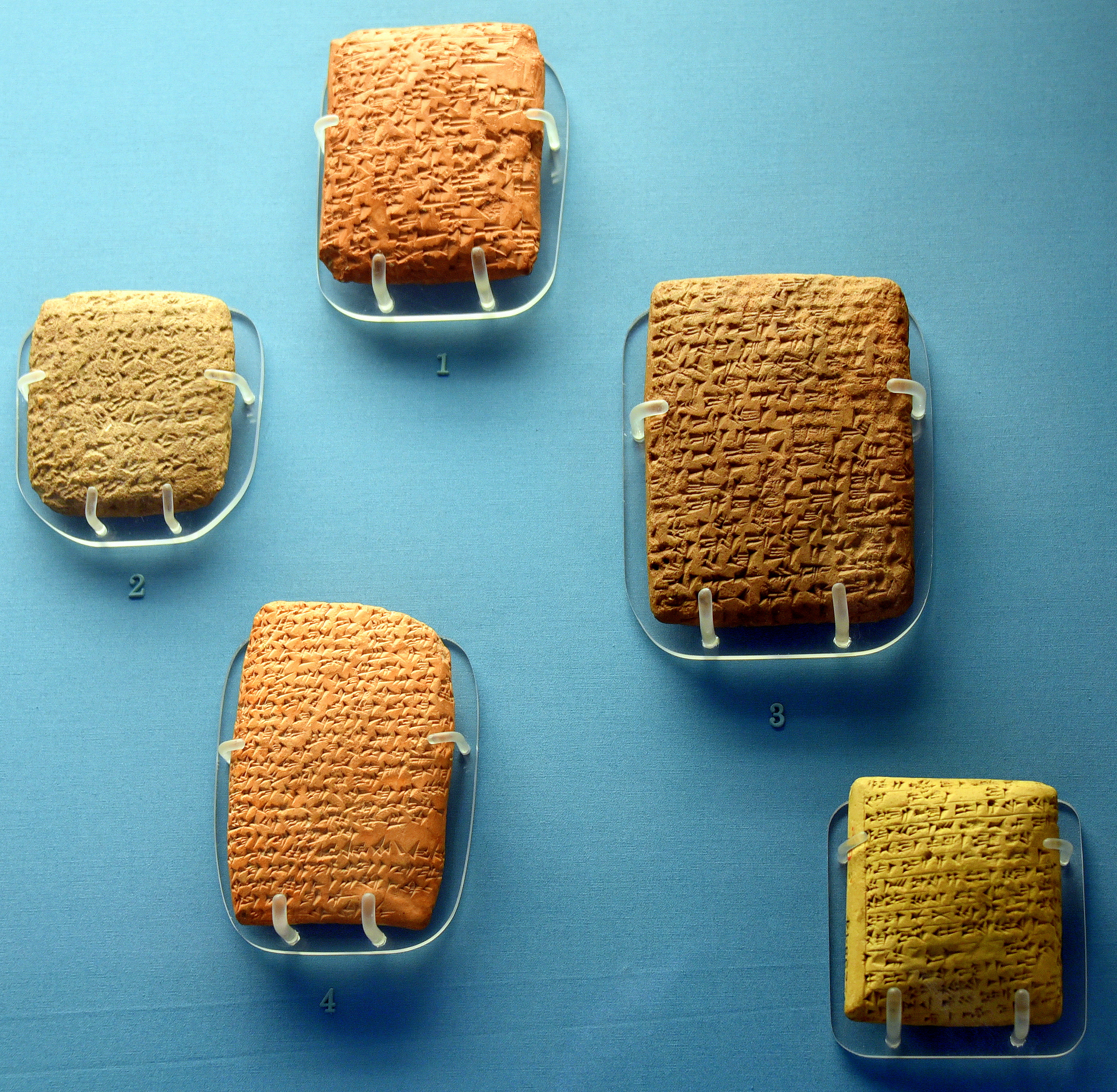
Five Amarna letters on display at the British Museum, London

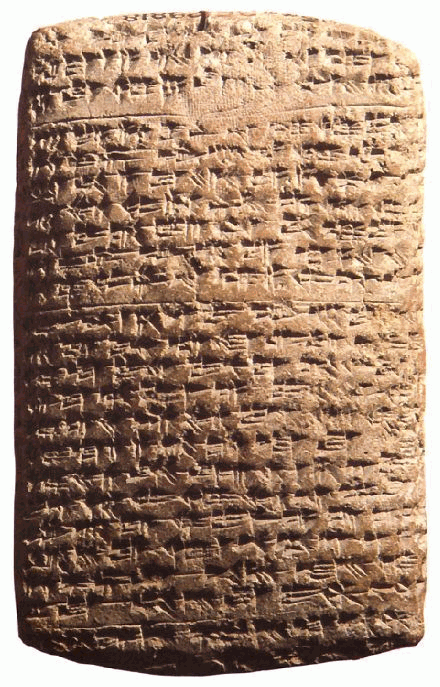
EA 161, letter by Aziru, leader of Amurru (stating his case to pharaoh), one of the Amarna letters in cuneiform writing on a clay tablet

The Amarna letters (/əˈmɑːrnə/; sometimes referred to as the Amarna correspondence or Amarna tablets, and cited with the abbreviation "EA", for "El Amarna") are an archive, written on clay tablets, primarily consisting of diplomatic correspondence between the Egyptian administration and its representatives in Canaan and Amurru, or neighboring kingdom leaders, during the New Kingdom, spanning a period of no more than 30 years in the middle of the 14th century BC. The letters were found in Upper Egypt at el-Amarna, the modern name for the ancient Egyptian capital of Akhetaten, founded by pharaoh Akhenaten (c. 1351–1334 BC) during the 18th Dynasty of Egypt.

The Amarna letters are unusual in Egyptological research, because they are written not in the language of ancient Egypt, but in cuneiform, the writing system of ancient Mesopotamia. Most are in a variety of Akkadian sometimes characterised as a mixed language, Canaanite-Akkadian; one especially long letter—abbreviated EA 24—was written in a late dialect of Hurrian, and is the longest contiguous text known to survive in that language.

The known tablets total 382 and fragments (350 are letters and the rest literary texts and school texts), of which 358 have been published by the Norwegian Assyriologist Jørgen Knudtzon in his work, Die El-Amarna-Tafeln, which came out in two volumes (1907 and 1915) and remains the standard edition to this day. The texts of the remaining 24 complete or fragmentary tablets excavated since Knudtzon have also been made available. Only 26 of the known tablets and fragments were found in their archaeological context, Building Q42.21.

The Amarna letters are of great significance for biblical studies as well as Semitic linguistics because they shed light on the culture and language of the Canaanite peoples in this time period. Though most are written in Akkadian, the Akkadian of the letters is heavily colored by the mother tongue of their writers, who probably spoke an early form of Proto-Canaanite, the language(s) which would later evolve into the mother languages of Hebrew and Phoenician. These "Canaanisms" provide valuable insights into the proto-stage of those languages several centuries prior to their first actual manifestation.

== Letters ==
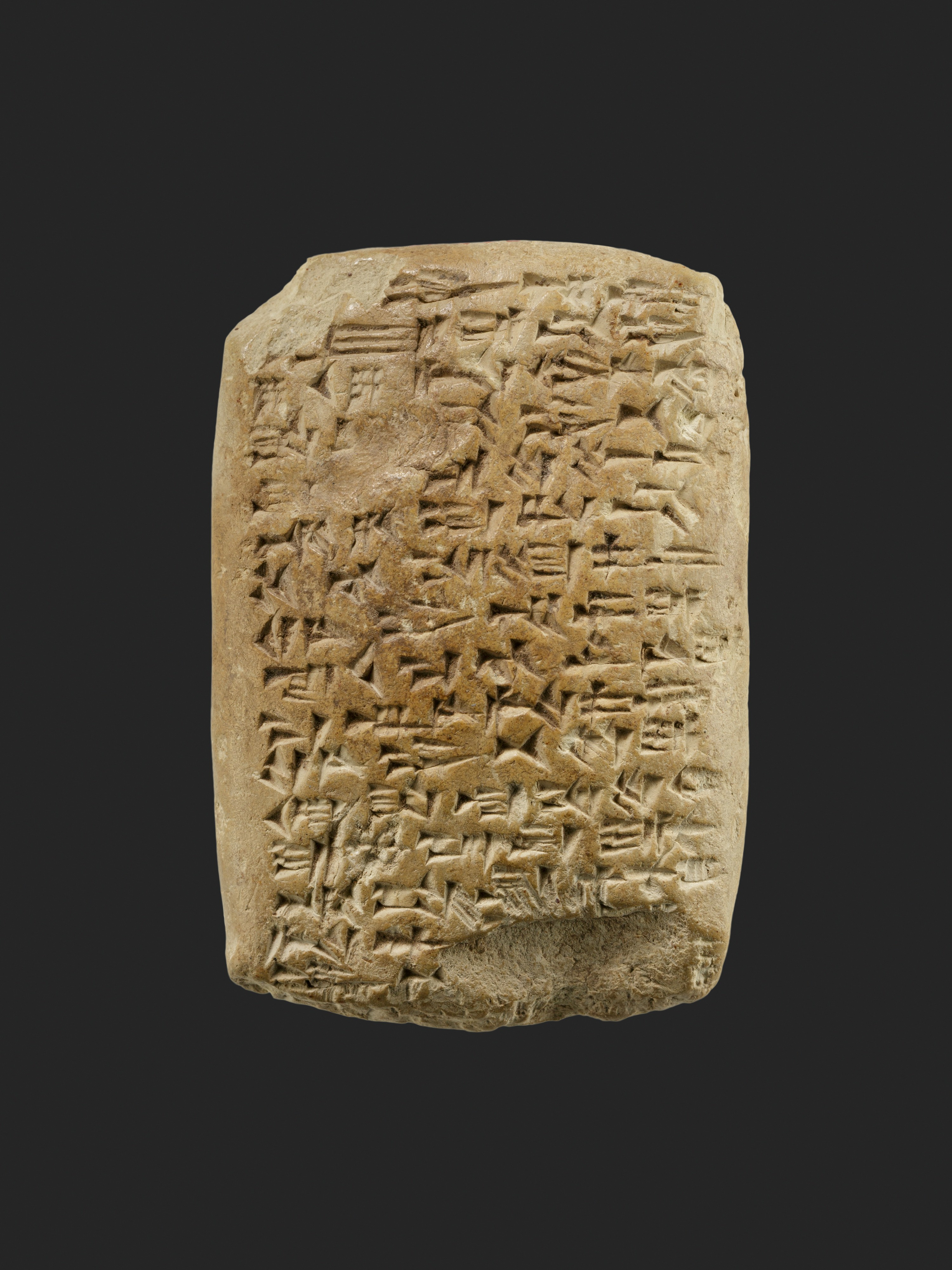
Amarna letter EA 153 from Abimilku

The letters, comprising cuneiform tablets written primarily in Akkadian—the regional language of diplomacy for this period—were first discovered around 1887 by local Egyptians who secretly dug most of them from the ruined city of Amarna, and sold them in the antiquities market. They had originally been stored in an ancient building that archaeologists have since called the Bureau of Correspondence of Pharaoh. Once the location where they were found was determined, the ruins were explored for more. The first archaeologist who successfully recovered more tablets was Flinders Petrie, who in 1891 and 1892 uncovered 21 fragments. Émile Chassinat, then director of the French Institute for Oriental Archaeology in Cairo, acquired two more tablets in 1903. Since Knudtzon's edition, some 24 more tablets, or fragments, have been found, either in Egypt, or identified in the collections of various museums.

The initial group of letters recovered by local Egyptians have been scattered among museums in Germany, the United Kingdom, Egypt, France, Russia, and the United States:

- 202 or 203 tablets are at the Vorderasiatisches Museum in Berlin;
- 99 are at the British Museum in London;
- 49 or 50 are at the Egyptian Museum in Cairo;
- 7 at the Louvre in Paris;
- 3 at the Pushkin Museum in Moscow;
- 1 in the collection of the Institute for the Study of Ancient Cultures in Chicago.

A few tablets are at the Ashmolean Museum in Oxford and the Royal Museums of Art and History in Brussels.

The archive contains a wealth of information about cultures, kingdoms, events and individuals in a period from which few written sources survive. It includes correspondence from Akhenaten (also titled Amenhotep IV)'s reign, as well as his predecessor Amenhotep III's reign. The tablets consist of over 300 diplomatic letters; the remainder comprise miscellaneous literary and educational materials. These tablets shed much light on Egyptian relations with Babylonia, Assyria, Syria, Canaan, and Alashiya (Cyprus) as well as relations with the Mitanni, and the Hittites. The letters have been important in establishing both the history and the chronology of the period. Letters from the Babylonian king, Kadashman-Enlil I, anchor the timeframe of Akhenaten's reign to the mid-14th century BC. They also contain the first mention of a Near Eastern group known as the Habiru, whose possible connection with the Hebrews—due to the similarity of the words and their geographic location—remains debated. Other rulers involved in the letters include Tushratta of Mitanni, Labaya of Shechem, Abdi-Heba of Jerusalem, and the quarrelsome king, Rib-Hadda, of Byblos, who, in over 58 letters, continuously pleads for Egyptian military help. Specifically, the letters include requests for military help in the north against Hittite invaders, and in the south to fight against the Habiru.

=== Letter found at Tell Beth-Shean ===
During excavation in 1993 a small, damaged, clay cylinder (first thought to be a cylinder seal) was found. It was inscribed with "Amarna Cuneiform" and held a letter which appears to be part of the Amarna correspondence.

"To Lab'aya, my lord, speak. Message of Tagi: To the King (Pharaoh), my lord: "I have listened carefully to your missive to me ...(illegible traces)"

=== Letter summary ===
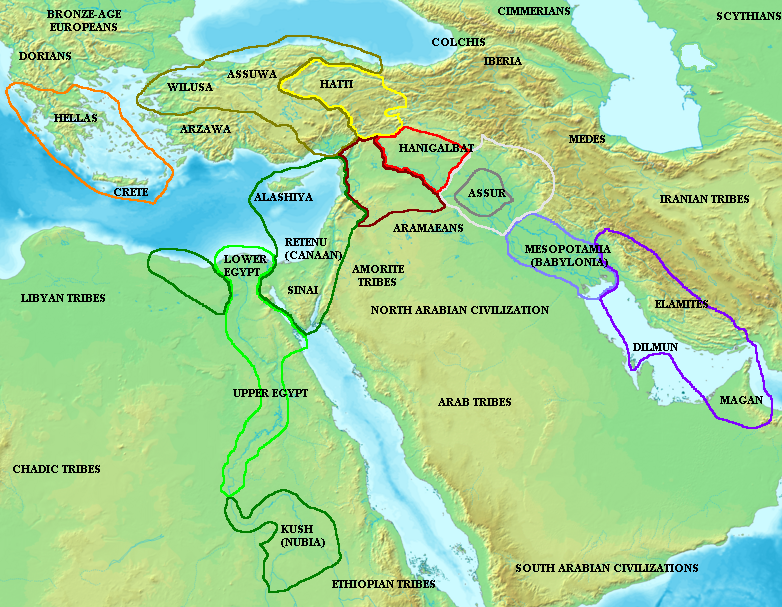
Map of the ancient Near East during the Amarna period, showing the great powers of the period: Egypt (green), Mycenaean Greece (orange), Hatti (yellow), the Kassite kingdom of Babylon (purple), Assyria (grey), and Mitanni (red). Lighter areas show direct control, darker areas represent spheres of influence.

Amarna Letters are politically arranged in a rough counterclockwise fashion:

- 001–014 Babylonia
- 015–016 Assyria
- 017–030 Mitanni
- 031–032 Arzawa
- 033–040 Alashiya
- 041–044 Hatti
- 045–380+ Syria/Lebanon/Canaan

Amarna Letters from Syria/Lebanon/Canaan are distributed roughly:

- 045–067 Syria
- 068–227 Lebanon (where 68–140 are from Gubla aka Byblos)
- 227–380 Canaan (written mostly in the Canaano-Akkadian language).

=== Akhenaten and Tushratta ===
Early in his reign, Akhenaten, the pharaoh of Egypt, had conflicts with Tushratta, the king of Mitanni, who had courted favor with his father, Amenhotep III, against the Hittites. Tushratta complains in numerous letters that Akhenaten had sent him gold-plated statues rather than statues made of solid gold; the statues formed part of the bride-price that Tushratta received for letting his daughter Tadukhepa marry Amenhotep III and then later marry Akhenaten.

An Amarna letter preserves a complaint by Tushratta to Akhenaten about the situation:

I...asked your father Mimmureya [i.e., Amenhotep III] for statues of solid cast gold, ... and your father said, 'Don't talk of giving statues just of solid cast gold. I will give you ones made also of lapis lazuli. I will give you too, along with the statues, much additional gold and [other] goods beyond measure.' Every one of my messengers that were staying in Egypt saw the gold for the statues with their own eyes. ... But my brother [i.e., Akhenaten] has not sent the solid [gold] statues that your father was going to send. You have sent plated ones of wood. Nor have you sent me the goods that your father was going to send me, but you have reduced [them] greatly. Yet there is nothing I know of in which I have failed my brother. ... May my brother send me much gold. ... In my brother's country gold is as plentiful as dust. May my brother cause me no distress. May he send me much gold in order that my brother [with the gold and m]any [good]s may honour me.

=== Jerusalem and the Habiru threat ===
A significant cluster of the Amarna letters (EA 285–290) was written by Abdi-Heba, the Canaanite chieftain of Jerusalem (referred to in the tablets as Urusalim).

In his correspondence, Abdi-Heba repeatedly pleads with the pharaoh—likely Akhenaten—for military assistance, specifically requesting archers to defend against the Habiru, a nomadic or semi-nomadic group of marauders and mercenaries who were attacking Egyptian vassal territories throughout Canaan.

Abdi-Heba expresses deep frustration with Egyptian officials who he claims are slandering him to the pharaoh, and he warns that without immediate reinforcements, all of the pharaoh's lands in the region will be lost. In EA 287, he emphasizes the city's importance to the Egyptian crown, stating: "As the king has placed his name in Jerusalem forever, he cannot abandon it—the land of Jerusalem."

== Amarna letters list ==
Note: Many assignments are tentative; spellings vary widely. This is just a guide.

EA#	Letter author to recipient
EA# 1	Amenhotep III to Babylonian king Kadashman-Enlil
EA# 2	Babylonian king Kadashman-Enlil to Amenhotep III
EA# 3	Babylonian king Kadashman-Enlil to Amenhotep III
EA# 4	Babylonian king Kadashman-Enlil to Amenhotep III
EA# 5	Amenhotep III to Babylonian king Kadashman-Enlil
EA# 6	Babylonian king Burna-Buriash II to Amenhotep III
EA# 7	Babylonian king Burna-Buriash II to Amenhotep IV
EA# 8	Babylonian king Burna-Buriash II to Amenhotep IV
EA# 9	Babylonian king Burna-Buriash II to Tutankhaten
EA# 10	Babylonian king Burna-Buriash II to Amenhotep IV
EA# 11	Babylonian king Burna-Buriash II to Amenhotep IV
EA# 12	A Babylonian Princess to the Pharaoh of Egypt
EA# 13	Burraburiash's Gifts to an Egyptian Princess
EA# 14	Amenhotep IV to Babylonian king Burna-Buriash II
EA# 15	Assyrian king Ashur-Uballit I to Amenhotep IV
EA# 16	Assyrian king Ashur-Uballit I to Amenhotep IV
EA# 17	Mitanni king Tushratta to Amenhotep III
EA# 18	Mitanni king Tushratta to Amenhotep III
EA# 19	Mitanni king Tushratta to Amenhotep III
EA# 20	Mitanni king Tushratta to Amenhotep III
EA# 21	Mitanni king Tushratta to Amenhotep III
EA# 22	Mitanni king Tushratta to Amenhotep III
EA# 23	Mitanni king Tushratta to Amenhotep III
EA# 24	Mitanni king Tushratta to Amenhotep III
EA# 25	Mitanni king Tushratta to Amenhotep III
EA# 26	Mitanni king Tushratta to widow Tiy
EA# 27	Mitanni king Tushratta to Amenhotep IV
EA# 28	Mitanni king Tushratta to Amenhotep IV
EA# 29	Mitanni king Tushratta to Amenhotep IV
EA# 30	Mitanni king to the kings of Canaan
EA# 31	Amenhotep III to Arzawa king Tarhuntaradu
EA# 32	Arzawa king Tarhundaraba to Pharaoh of Egypt Amenhotep III
EA# 33	Alashiya king to Pharaoh of Egypt #1
EA# 34	Alashiya king to Pharaoh of Egypt #2
EA# 35	Alashiya king to Pharaoh of Egypt #3
EA# 36	Alashiya king to Pharaoh of Egypt #4
EA# 37	Alashiya king to Pharaoh of Egypt #5
EA# 38	Alashiya king to Pharaoh of Egypt #6
EA# 39	Alashiya king to Pharaoh of Egypt #7
EA# 40	Alashiya minister to Egypt minister
EA# 41	Hittite king Suppiluliuma I to Huri[a]
EA# 42	Hittite king to King of Egypt
EA# 43	Suppiluliuma, Hittite King, to the King of Egypt
EA# 44	Hittite prince Zi[t]a to the King of Egypt
EA# 45	'Ammittamru I, Ugarit king, to the King of Egypt
EA# 46	Ugarit king to Egyptian king
EA# 47	Ugarit king to Egyptian king
EA# 48	Heba, Queen of Ugarit, to the Queen of Egypt
EA# 49	Ugarit king Niqm-Adda II to the King of Egypt
EA# 50	Maidservant to the Queen of Egypt
EA# 51	Nuhasse king Addunirari to the King of Egypt
EA# 52	Qatna king Akizzi to Amenhotep III #1
EA# 53	Qatna king Akizzi to Amenhotep III #2
EA# 54	Qatna king Akizzi to Amenhotep III #3
EA# 55	Qatna king Akizzi to Amenhotep III #4
EA# 56	Akizzi(?), the Ruler of Qatna, to Amenhotep IV, the King of Egypt
EA# 57	Akizzi, the Ruler of Qatna, to Amenhotep IV, the King of Egypt
EA# 58	Tehu-Teshupa(Also called [Qat]ihutisupa), a Ruler in North Canaan(?), to the King of Egypt
EA# 59	Tunip peoples to pharaoh
EA# 60	Amurru king Abdi-Asirta to Amenhotep III, the king of Egypt
EA# 61	Amurru king Abdi-Asirta to Amenhotep III, the king of Egypt #2
EA# 62	Amurru king Abdi-Asirta to Pahanate, the Commissioner of Sumur
EA# 63	'Abdi-Ashtarti, a Ruler in Southern Canaan (Gath?), to the king of Egypt
EA# 64	'Abdi-Ashtarti, a Ruler in Southern Canaan (Gath?), to the king of Egypt #2
EA# 65	'Abdi-Ashtarti, a Ruler in Southern Canaan (Gath?), to the king of Egypt #3
EA# 66	Rib-Hadda, the Ruler of Byblos, to Haya, the Vizier of Egypt
EA# 67	An unknown ruler in the north of Canaan to the King of Egypt
EA# 68	Gubal king Rib-Addi to the pharaoh of Egypt #1
EA# 69	Gubal king Rib-Addi to Egypt official
EA# 70	Gubal king Rib-Addi to the pharaoh of Egypt #2
EA# 71	Gubal king Rib-Addi to Haya, the Vizier of Egypt
EA# 72	Gubal king Rib-Addi to the pharaoh of Egypt #3
EA# 73	Gubal king Rib-Addi to Amanappa, an Egyptian official #1
EA# 74	Gubal king Rib-Addi to the pharaoh of Egypt #4
EA# 75	Gubal king Rib-Addi to the pharaoh of Egypt #5
EA# 76	Gubal king Rib-Addi to the pharaoh of Egypt #6
EA# 77	Gubal king Rib-Addi to Amanappa, an Egyptian official #2
EA# 78	Gubal king Rib-Addi to the pharaoh of Egypt #7
EA# 79	Gubal king Rib-Addi to he pharaoh of Egypt #8
EA# 80	Gubal king Rib-Addi(?) to the pharaoh of Egypt #9
EA# 81	Gubal king Rib-Addi to the pharaoh of Egypt #10
EA# 82	Gubal king Rib-Addi to Amanappa, an Egyptian official #3
EA# 83	Gubal king Rib-Addi to the pharaoh of Egypt #11
EA# 84	Gubal king Rib-Addi to the pharaoh of Egypt #12
EA# 85	Gubal king Rib-Addi to the pharaoh of Egypt #13
EA# 86	Gubal king Rib-Addi to Amanappa, an Egyptian official #4
EA# 87	Gubal king Rib-Addi to Amanappa, an Egyptian official #5
EA# 88	Gubal king Rib-Addi to the pharaoh of Egypt #14
EA# 89	Gubal king Rib-Addi to the pharaoh of Egypt #15
EA# 90	Gubal king Rib-Addi to the pharaoh of Egypt #16
EA# 91	Gubal king Rib-Addi to the pharaoh of Egypt #17
EA# 92	Gubal king Rib-Addi to the pharaoh of Egypt #18
EA# 93	Gubal king Rib-Addi to Amanappa, an Egyptian official #6
EA# 94	Rib-Hadda, the ruler of Byblos, to the king of Egypt #19
EA# 95	Rib-Hadda, the ruler of Byblos, to the Egyptian Senior Official
EA# 96	An army commander to Rib-Hadda, the ruler of Byblos
EA# 97	Yappah-Hadda to Shumu-Hadda
EA# 98	Yappah-Hadda to Yanhamu, the Egyptian Commissioner
EA# 99	The king of Egypt to the ruler of the city of 'Ammiya(?)
EA#100	The city of Irqata to the pharaoh of Egypt
EA#100	Tagi to Lab-Aya
EA#101	Rib-Hadda, the ruler of Byblos, to the king of Egypt #20
EA#102	Rib-Hadda, the ruler of Byblos, to Yanhamu(?), the Egyptian commissioner
EA#103	Rib-Hadda, the ruler of Byblos, to the king of Egypt #21
EA#104	Rib-Hadda, the ruler of Byblos, to the king of Egypt #22
EA#105	Rib-Hadda, the ruler of Byblos, to the king of Egypt #23
EA#106	Rib-Hadda, the ruler of Byblos, to the king of Egypt #24
EA#107	Rib-Hadda, the ruler of Byblos, to the king of Egypt #25
EA#108	Rib-Hadda, the ruler of Byblos, to the king of Egypt #26
EA#109	Rib-Hadda, the ruler of Byblos, to the king of Egypt #27
EA#110	Rib-Hadda, the ruler of Byblos, to the king of Egypt #28
EA#111	Rib-Hadda, the ruler of Byblos, to the king of Egypt #29
EA#112	Rib-Hadda, the ruler of Byblos, to the king of Egypt #30
EA#113	Rib-Hadda, the ruler of Byblos, to the king of Egypt #31
EA#114	Rib-Hadda, the ruler of Byblos, to the king of Egypt #32
EA#115	Rib-Hadda, the ruler of Byblos, to the king of Egypt #33
EA#116	Rib-Hadda, the ruler of Byblos, to the king of Egypt #34
EA#117	Rib-Hadda, the ruler of Byblos, to the king of Egypt #35
EA#118	Rib-Hadda, the ruler of Byblos, to the king of Egypt #36
EA#119	Rib-Hadda, the ruler of Byblos, to the king of Egypt #37
EA#120	Rib-Hadda, the ruler of Byblos, to the king of Egypt #38
EA#121	Rib-Hadda, the ruler of Byblos, to the king of Egypt #39
EA#122	Rib-Hadda, the ruler of Byblos, to the king of Egypt #40
EA#123	Rib-Hadda, the ruler of Byblos, to the king of Egypt #41
EA#124	Rib-Hadda, the ruler of Byblos, to the king of Egypt #42
EA#125	Rib-Hadda, the ruler of Byblos, to the king of Egypt #43
EA#126	Rib-Hadda, the ruler of Byblos, to the king of Egypt #44
EA#127	Rib-Hadda, the ruler of Byblos, to the king of Egypt #45
EA#128	Rib-Hadda, the ruler of Byblos, to the king of Egypt #46
EA#129	Rib-Hadda, the ruler of Byblos, to the king of Egypt #47
EA#129	Rib-Hadda, the ruler of Byblos, to the king of Egypt #48
EA#130	Rib-Hadda, the ruler of Byblos, to the king of Egypt #49
EA#131	Rib-Hadda, the ruler of Byblos, to the king of Egypt #50
EA#132	Rib-Hadda, the ruler of Byblos, to the king of Egypt #51
EA#133	Rib-Hadda, the ruler of Byblos, to the king of Egypt #52
EA#134	Rib-Hadda, the ruler of Byblos, to the king of Egypt #53
EA#135	Rib-Hadda, the ruler of Byblos, to the king of Egypt #54
EA#136	Rib-Hadda, the ruler of Byblos, to the king of Egypt #55
EA#137	Rib-Hadda, the ruler of Byblos, to the king of Egypt #56
EA#138	Rib-Hadda, the ruler of Byblos, to the king of Egypt #57
EA#139	Ilirabih the city of Byblos to the king of Egypt #1
EA#140	Ilirabih the city of Byblos to the king of Egypt #2
EA#141	Beruta king Ammunira to the king of Egypt #1
EA#142	Beruta king Ammunira to the king of Egypt #2
EA#143	Beruta king Ammunira to the king of Egypt #2
EA#144	Zimredda, the ruler of Sidon, to the king of Egypt #1
EA#145	Zimredda, the ruler of Sidon, to the king of Egypt #2
EA#146	Tyre king Abi-Milki to the king of Egypt #1
EA#147	Tyre king AbiMilki to the king of Egypt #2
EA#148	Tyre king AbiMilki to the king of Egypt #3
EA#149	Tyre king AbiMilki to the king of Egypt #4
EA#150	Tyre king AbiMilki to the king of Egypt #5
EA#151	Tyre king AbiMilki to the king of Egypt #6
EA#152	Tyre king AbiMilki to the king of Egypt #7
EA#153	Tyre king AbiMilki to the king of Egypt #8
EA#154	Tyre king AbiMilki to the king of Egypt #9
EA#155	Tyre king AbiMilki to the king of Egypt #10
EA#156	Amurru king Aziri to pharaoh #1
EA#157	Amurru king Aziri to pharaoh #2
EA#158	Amurru king Aziri to Dudu #1
EA#159	Amurru king Aziri to pharaoh #3
EA#160	Amurru king Aziri to pharaoh #4
EA#161	Amurru king Aziri to pharaoh #5
EA#162	pharaoh to Amurra prince
EA#163	The King of Egypt to a Canaanite Ruler(?)
EA#164	Amurru king Aziri to Dudu #2
EA#165	Amurru king Aziri to pharaoh #6
EA#166	Amurru king Aziri to Hai
EA#167	Amurru king Aziri to (Hai #2?)
EA#168	Amurru king Aziri to pharaoh #7
EA#169	Amurru son of Aziri to an Egypt official
EA#170	Ba-Aluia & Battiilu to the king
EA#171	Amurru son of Aziri to pharaoh
EA#172	A ruler of Amurru to the king of Egypt
EA#173	The Ruler of (?) to the king of Egypt
EA#174	Bieri of Hasabu
EA#175	Ildaja of Hazi to king
EA#176	Abdi-Risa
EA#177	Guddasuna king Jamiuta
EA#178	Hibija to a chief
EA#179	The deposed ruler of Oftobihi to the King of Egypt
EA#180	The Ruler of (?) to the King of Egypt
EA#181	The Ruler of (?) to the King of Egypt
EA#182	Mitanni king Shuttarna to pharaoh #1
EA#183	Mitanni king Shuttarna to pharaoh #2
EA#184	Mitanni king Shuttarna to pharaoh #3
EA#185	Majarzana of Hazi to king
EA#186	Majarzana of Hazi to king #2
EA#187	Satija of ... to king
EA#188	The Ruler of (?) to the King of Egypt
EA#189	Qadesh mayor Etakkama
EA#190	pharaoh to Qadesh mayor Etakkama(?)
EA#191	Ruhiza king Arzawaija to king
EA#192	Ruhiza king Arzawaija to king #2
EA#193	Dijate to king
EA#194	Damascus mayor Biryawaza to king #1
EA#195	Damascus mayor Biryawaza to king #2
EA#196	Damascus mayor Biryawaza to king #3
EA#197	Damascus mayor Biryawaza to king #4
EA#198	Ara[ha]ttu of Kumidi to king
EA#199	The Ruler of (?) to the King of Egypt
EA#200	The Ruler of (?) to the King of Egypt
EA#2001	Sealants
EA#2002	Sealants
EA#201	Artemanja of Ziribasani to king
EA#202	Amajase to king
EA#203	Abdi-Milki of Sashimi
EA#204	prince of Qanu to king
EA#205	Gubbu prince to king
EA#206	prince of Naziba to king
EA#207	Ipteh ... to king
EA#208	... to Egypt official or king
EA#209	Zisamimi to king
EA#210	Zisami[mi] to Amenhotep IV
EA#210	Carchemish king to Ugarit king Asukwari
EA#211	Zitrijara to king #1
EA#2110	Ewiri-Shar to Plsy
EA#212	Zitrijara to king #2
EA#213	Zitrijara to king #3
EA#214	The Ruler of (?) to the King of Egypt
EA#215	Baiawa to king #1
EA#216	Baiawa to king #2
EA#217	The Ruler of (?) to the King of Egypt
EA#218	The Ruler of (?) to the King of Egypt
EA#219	The Ruler of (?) to the King of Egypt
EA#220	Nukurtuwa of (?) [Z]unu to king
EA#221	Wiktazu to king #1
EA#222	Yiqdasu, a ruler of a Canaanite city, to the King of Egypt
EA#222	Wik[tazu] to king #2
EA#223	En[g]u[t]a to king
EA#224	Sum-Add[a] to king
EA#225	Sum-Adda of Samhuna to king
EA#226	Sipturi_ to king
EA#227	Hazor king
EA#228	Hazor king Abdi-Tirsi
EA#229	Abdi-na-... to king
EA#230	Iama to king
EA#231	The Ruler of (?) to the King of Egypt
EA#232	Acco king Zurata to pharaoh
EA#233	Acco king Zatatna to pharaoh #1
EA#234	Acco king Zatatna to pharaoh #2
EA#235	Zitatna/(Zatatna) to king
EA#236	The Ruler of (?) to the King of Egypt
EA#237	Bajadi to king
EA#238	Bajadi to an Egyptian Official
EA#239	Baduzana to the king of Egypt
EA#240	The Ruler of (?) to the King of Egypt
EA#241	Rusmania to king
EA#242	Megiddo king Biridija to pharaoh #1
EA#243	Megiddo king Biridija to pharaoh #2
EA#244	Megiddo king Biridija to pharaoh #3
EA#245	Megiddo king Biridija to pharaoh #4
EA#246	Megiddo king Biridija to pharaoh #5
EA#247	Megiddo king Biridija or Jasdata
EA#248	Ja[sd]ata to king
EA#248	Megiddo king Biridija to pharaoh
EA#249	Ba'lu-Meher(?), the ruler of Gath-Padalla, to the king of Egypt
EA#249	Addu-Ur-sag to king
EA#250	Addu-Ur-sag to king
EA#2500	Shechem
EA#251	The Ruler of (?) to the King of Egypt
EA#252	Labaja to king
EA#253	Labaja to king
EA#254	Labaja to king
EA#255	Mut-Balu or Mut-Bahlum to king
EA#256	Mut-Balu to Ianhamu
EA#257	Balu-Mihir to king #1
EA#258	Balu-Mihir to king #2
EA#259	Balu-Mihir to king #3
EA#260	Balu-Mihir to king #4
EA#261	Dasru to king #1
EA#262	Dasru to king #2
EA#263	The Ruler of (?) to the King of Egypt
EA#264	Gezer leader Tagi to pharaoh #1
EA#265	Gezer leader Tagi to pharaoh #2
EA#266	Gezer leader Tagi to pharaoh #3
EA#267	Gezer mayor Milkili to pharaoh #1
EA#268	Gezer mayor Milkili to pharaoh #2
EA#269	Gezer mayor Milkili to pharaoh #3
EA#270	Gezer mayor Milkili to pharaoh #4
EA#271	Gezer mayor Milkili to pharaoh #5
EA#272	Ba'lu-Dani (Or Ba'lu-Shipti), the ruler of Gezer, to the king of Egypt
EA#273	Ba-Lat-Nese to king
EA#274	Ba-Lat-Nese to king #2
EA#275	Iahazibada to king #1
EA#276	Iahazibada to king #2
EA#277	Qiltu king Suwardata to pharaoh #1
EA#278	Qiltu king Suwardata to pharaoh #2
EA#279	Qiltu king Suwardata to pharaoh #3
EA#280	Qiltu king Suwardata to pharaoh #3
EA#281	Qiltu king Suwardata to pharaoh #4
EA#282	Qiltu king Suwardata to pharaoh #5
EA#283	Qiltu king Suwardata to pharaoh #6
EA#284	Qiltu king Suwardata to pharaoh #7
EA#285	Jerusalem king Abdi-Hiba to pharaoh
EA#286	Jerusalem king AbdiHiba to pharaoh
EA#287	Jerusalem king AbdiHiba to pharaoh
EA#288	Jerusalem king AbdiHiba to pharaoh
EA#289	Jerusalem king AbdiHiba to pharaoh
EA#290	Jerusalem king AbdiHiba to pharaoh
EA#290	Qiltu king Suwardata to king
EA#291	'Abdi-Heba, the ruler of Jerusalem, to the king of Egypt
EA#292	Gezer mayor Addudani to pharaoh #1
EA#293	Gezer mayor Addudani to pharaoh #2
EA#294	Gezer mayor Addudani to pharaoh #3
EA#295	Gezer mayor Addudani to pharaoh #4
EA#296	Gaza king Iahtiri
EA#297	Gezer mayor Iapah[i] to pharaoh #1
EA#298	Gezer mayor Iapahi to pharaoh #2
EA#299	Gezer mayor Iapahi to pharaoh #3
EA#300	Gezer mayor Iapahi to pharaoh #4
EA#301	Subandu to king #1
EA#302	Subandu to king #2
EA#303	Subandu to king #3
EA#304	Subandu to king #4
EA#305	Subandu to king #5
EA#306	Subandu to king #6
EA#307	The Ruler of (?) to the King of Egypt
EA#308	The Ruler of (?) to the King of Egypt
EA#309	The Ruler of (?) to the King of Egypt
EA#310	The Ruler of (?) to the King of Egypt
EA#311	The Ruler of (?) to the King of Egypt
EA#312	The Ruler of (?) to the King of Egypt
EA#313	The Ruler of (?) to the King of Egypt
EA#314	Jursa king Pu-Ba-Lu to pharaoh #1
EA#315	Jursa king PuBaLu to pharaoh #2
EA#316	Jursa king PuBaLu to pharaoh
EA#317	Dagantakala to king #1
EA#318	Dagantakala to king #2
EA#319	A[h]tirumna king Zurasar to king
EA#320	Asqalon king Widia to pharaoh #1
EA#321	Asqalon king Widia to pharaoh #2
EA#322	Asqalon king Widia to pharaoh #3
EA#323	Asqalon king Widia to pharaoh #4
EA#324	Asqalon king Widia to pharaoh #5
EA#325	Asqalon king Widia to pharaoh #6
EA#326	Asqalon king Widia to pharaoh #7
EA#327	... the king
EA#328	Lakis mayor Iabniilu to pharaoh
EA#329	Lakis king Zimridi to pharaoh
EA#330	Lakis mayor Sipti-Ba-Lu to pharaoh #1
EA#331	Lakis mayor SiptiBaLu to pharaoh #2
EA#332	Lakis mayor SiptiBaLu to pharaoh #3
EA#333	Ebi to a prince
EA#334	---dih of Zuhra [-?] to king
EA#335	--- [of Z]uhr[u] to king
EA#336	Hiziri to king #1
EA#337	Hiziri to king #2
EA#338	Zi. .. to king
EA#339	... to king
EA#340	...
EA#341	...
EA#342	...
EA#356	myth of Adapa and the South Wind
EA#357	myth of Ereskigal and Nergal
EA#358	myth fragments
EA#359	myth Epic of King of Battle
EA#360	...
EA#361	...
EA#362	...
EA#364	Ayyab to king
EA#365	Megiddo king Biridiya to pharaoh
EA#366	Shuwardata, the ruler of Gath, to the king
EA#367	pharaoh to Endaruta of Akshapa
EA#369	Amenhotep IV to Milkilu, the ruler of Gezer
EA#xxx	Amenhotep III to Milkili
H#3100	Tell el-Hesi
P#3200	Pella prince Mut-Balu to Yanhamu
P#3210	Lion Woman to king
T#3002	Amenhotep to Taanach king Rewassa
T#3005	Amenhotep to Taanach king Rewassa
T#3006	Amenhotep to Taanach king Rewassa
U#4001	Ugarit king Niqmaddu

== Chronology ==
William L. Moran summarizes the state of the chronology of these tablets as follows:

Despite a long history of inquiry, the chronology of the Amarna letters, both relative and absolute, presents many problems, some of bewildering complexity, that still elude definitive solution. Consensus obtains only about what is obvious, certain established facts, and these provide only a broad framework within which many and often quite different reconstructions of the course of events reflected in the Amarna letters are possible and have been defended. ...The Amarna archive, it is now generally agreed, spans at most about thirty years, perhaps only fifteen or so.

From the internal evidence, the earliest possible date for this correspondence is the final decade of the reign of Amenhotep III, who ruled from 1388 to 1351 BC (or 1391 to 1353 BC), possibly as early as this king's 30th regnal year; the latest date any of these letters were written is the desertion of the city of Amarna, commonly believed to have happened in the second year of the reign of Tutankhamun later in the same century in 1332 BC. Moran notes that some scholars believe one tablet, EA 16, may have been addressed to Tutankhamun's successor Ay or Smenkhkare. However, this speculation appears improbable because the Amarna archives were closed by Year 2 of Tutankhamun, when this king transferred Egypt's capital from Amarna to Thebes.

== Quotations and phrases ==
A small number of the Amarna letters are in the class of poetry. An example is EA 153, entitled: "Ships on hold", from Abimilku of Tyre. This is a short, 20-line letter. Lines 6–8 and 9-11 are parallel phrases, each ending with "...before the troops of the king, my lord."-('before', then line 8, line 11). Both sentences are identical, and repetitive, with only the subject statement changing.

The entire corpus of Amarna letters has many standard phrases. It also has some phrases, and quotations used only once. Some are parables: (EA 252: "...when an ant is pinched (struck), does it not fight back and bite the hand of the man that struck it?"....)

=== Bird in a Cage ===
A bird in a cage (Trap)—Rib-Hadda subcorpus of letters. (Rib-Hadda was trapped in Gubla-(Byblos), unable to move freely.)

=== "A brick may move.." ===
A brick may move from under its partner, still I will not move from under the feet of the king, my lord.—Used in letters EA 266, 292, and 296. EA 292 by Adda-danu of Gazru.

=== "For the lack of a cultivator.." ===
"For the lack of a cultivator, my field is like a woman without a husband."—Rib-Hadda letter EA 75

=== "Hale like the Sun..." ===
"And know that the King-(pharaoh) is hale like the Sun in the Sky. For his troops and his chariots in multitude all goes very well...."—See: Endaruta, for the Short Form; See: Milkilu, for a Long Form. Also found in EA 99: entitled: "From the Pharaoh to a vassal". (with addressee damaged)

=== "I looked this way, and I looked..." ===
"I looked this way, and I looked that way, and there was no light. Then I looked towards the king, my lord, and there was light."—EA 266 by Tagi (Ginti mayor); EA 296 by Yahtiru.

=== "May the Lady of Gubla..." ===
"May the Lady of Gubla grant power to the king, my lord."—varieties of the phrase in the Rib-Hadda letters

=== a pot held in pledge ===
a pot held in pledge—The Pot of a Debt. EA 292 by Adda-danu of Gazru.

=== 7 times and 7 times again ===
7 times and 7 times—Over and over again
7 times plus 7—EA 189, See: "Etakkama of Kadesh"(title)-(Qidšu)

=== I fall ... 7 times and 7..."on the back and on the stomach" ===
I fall, at the feet, ... 7 times and 7 times, "on the back and on the stomach"—EA 316, by Pu-Ba'lu, and used in numerous letters to pharaoh. See: Commissioner: Tahmašši.

=== When an ant is struck... ===
"...when an ant is pinched (struck), does it not fight back and bite the hand of the man that struck it?"—A phrase used by Labayu defending his actions of overtaking cities, EA 252. Title: "Sparing one's enemies".

== Example, single letter photo gallery, multiple sides ==
Amarna letter EA 15, from Ashur-uballit I; see also Amarna letter EA 153.

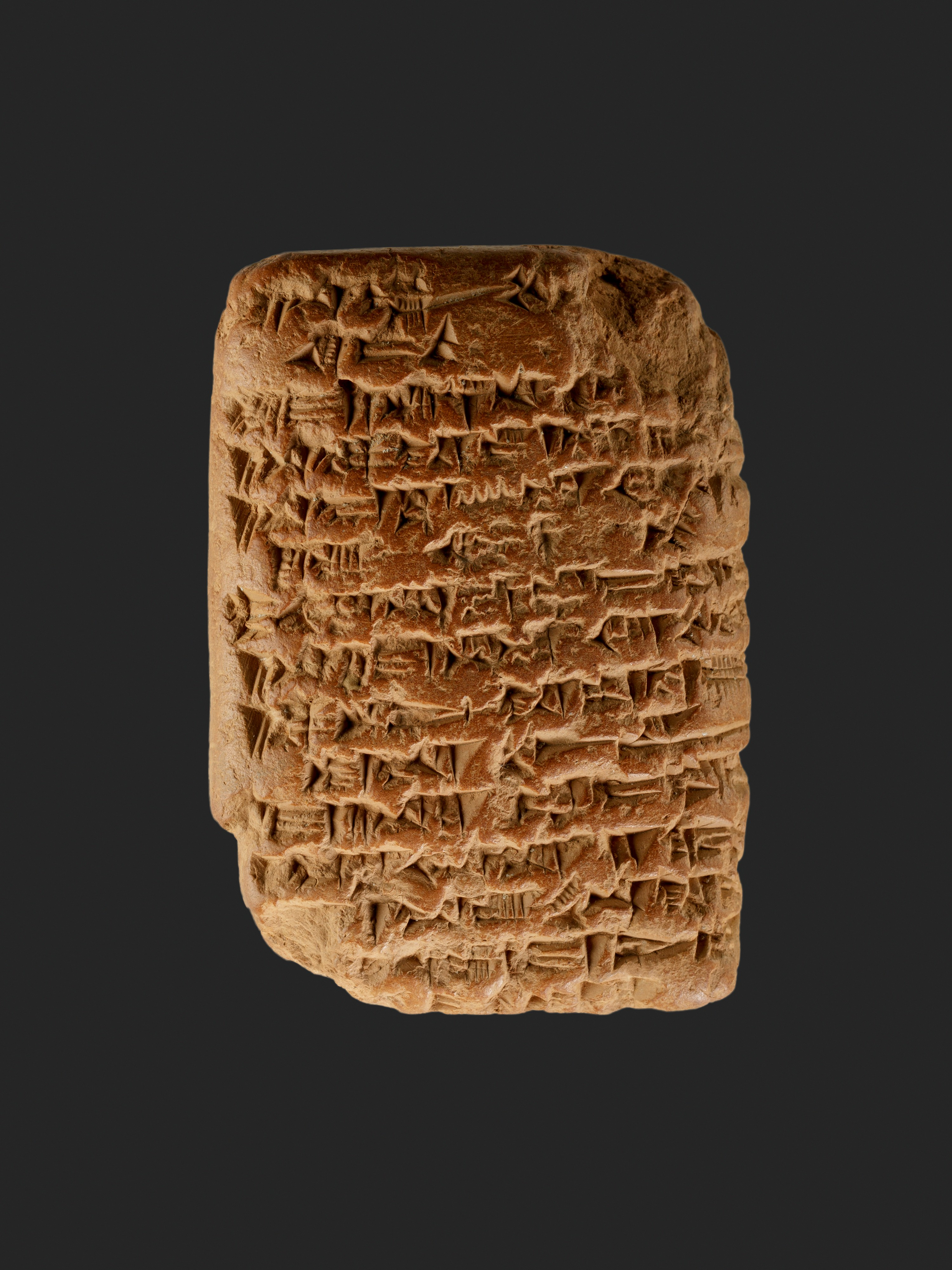
Obverse

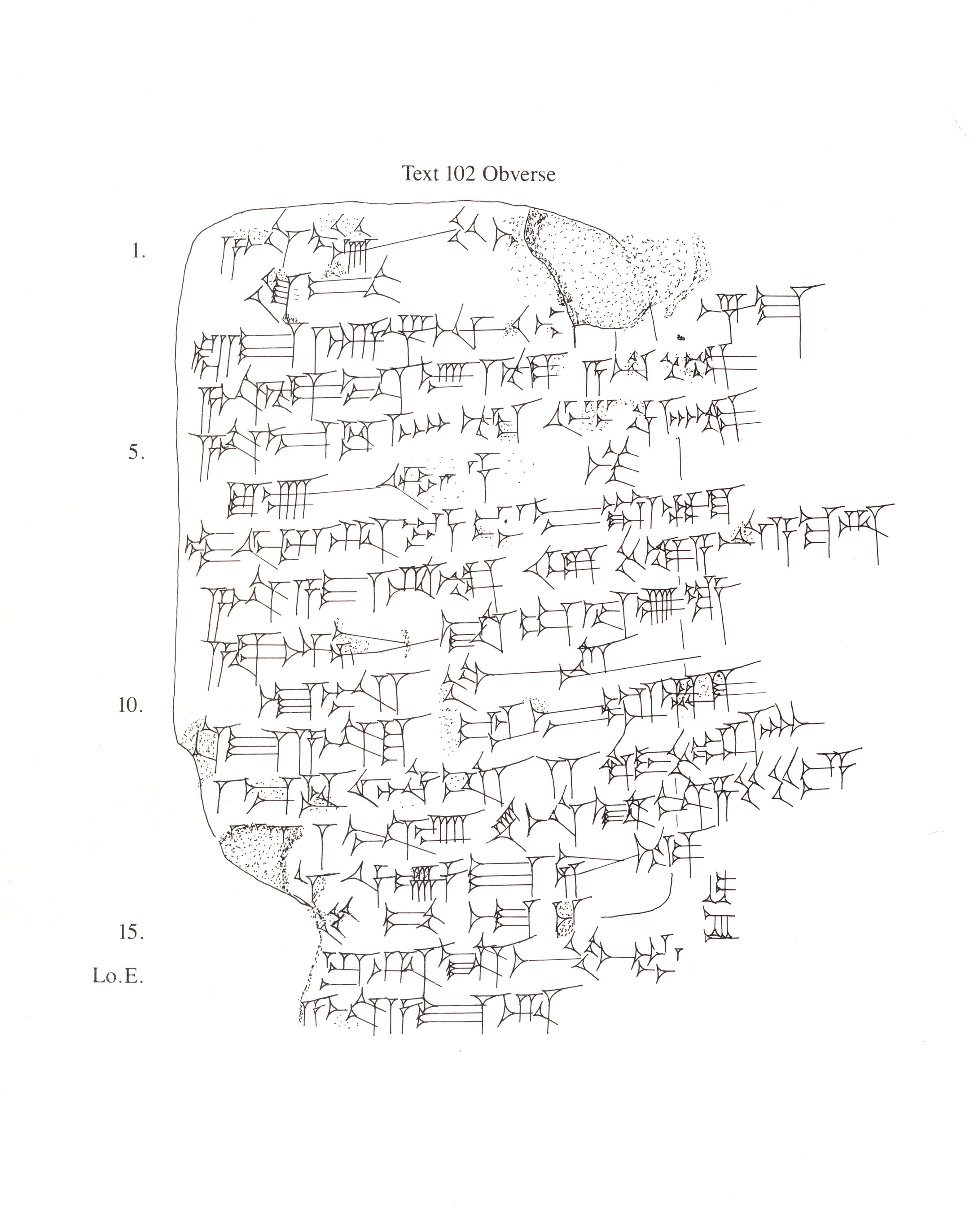
Line drawing, obverse

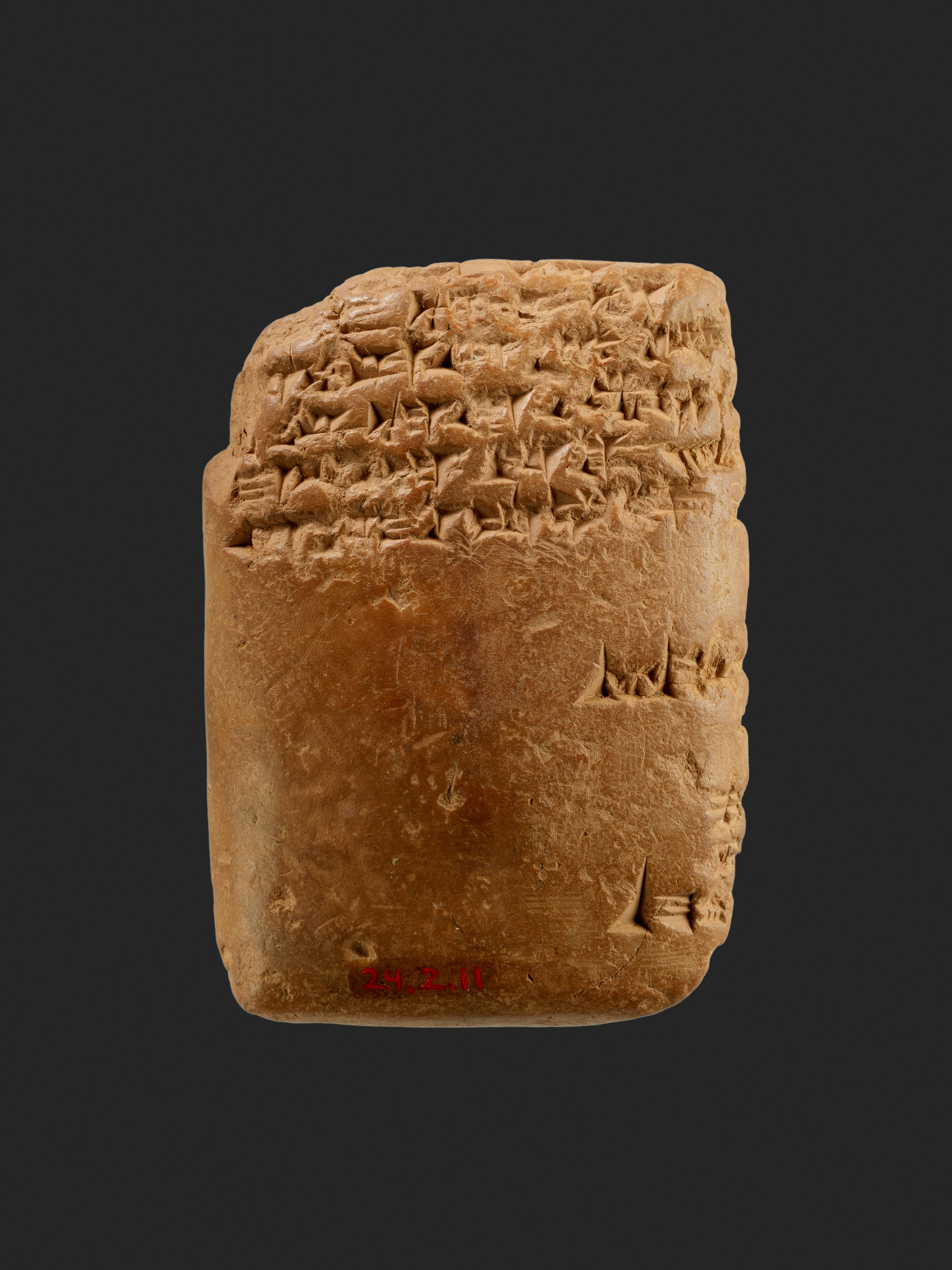
Reverse

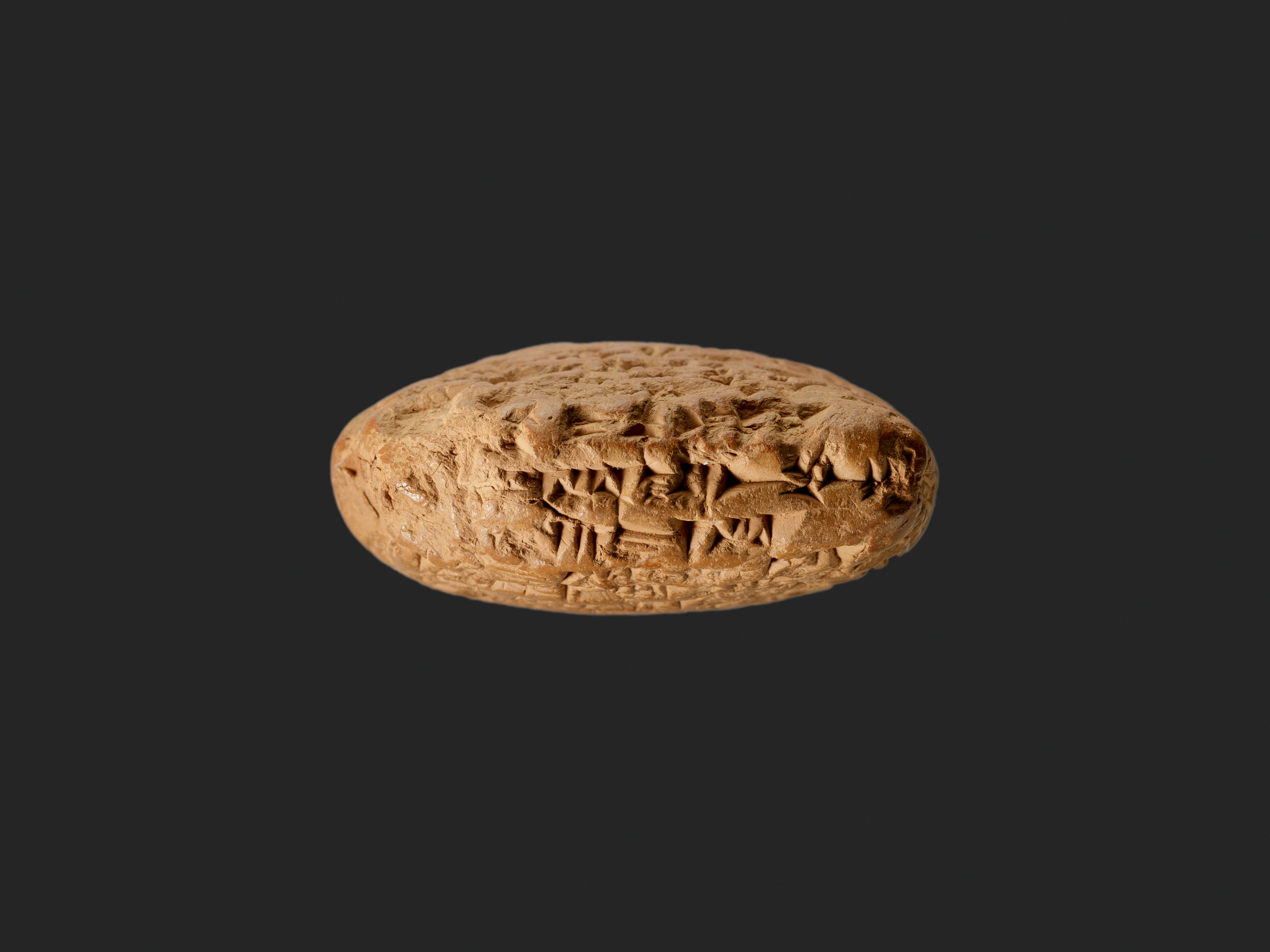
View from bottom

== See also ==
- Abdi-Heba
- Amarna letters–localities and their rulers
- Ashur-uballit I
- Amarna Period
- Hittite inscriptions
- Labaya
- List of Amarna letters by size
- List of inscriptions in biblical archaeology
- Mari tablets
- Mutbaal
- Šuwardata
- Ugaritic texts
