= EA7 =

EA7 may refer to:

- Amarna letter EA 7, a letter of correspondence in ancient Egypt
- EA7, a label marketed by Italian fashion house Armani
- Edgley EA-7 Optica, a British light aircraft
