= Jean Nougayrol =

French cuneiformist

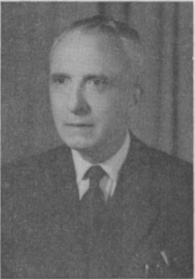
- Born: 4 February 1900; Toulouse
- Died: 23 January 1975 (aged 74); Paris
- Occupation: Archaeologist

Jean Nougayrol was a French cuneiformist who studied a number of the Amarna letters.

== Career ==
Nougayrol studied Hebrew under Georges Boyer before becoming interested in cuneiform writing. He was particularly interested in Babylonian divination. While studying at the École Biblique in Jerusalem in 1935, he began to study Cylinder seals and published a book about them. He was curator of Oriental Antiquity at the Louvre from 1947 to 1960. In 1968, he became a member of the Académie des Inscriptions et Belles-Lettres.

== Some publications ==
- Une Fable babylonienne, Gembloux, impr. de J. Duculot, 1941
- Cylindres-sceaux et empreintes de cylindres trouvés en Palestine (au cours de fouilles régulières), Paris, P. Geuthner, 1939
- Note sur la place des « Présages historiques » dans l'extispicine babylonienne, Melun, Impr. administrative, 1945
- Charles Fossey (1869-1946), Paris, Imprimerie nationale, 1947
- Le Palais royal d'Ugarit III (planches), Textes accadiens et hourrites des archives Est, Ouest et centrales, publié sous la direction de Claude F.-A. Schaeffer, avec des études de Georges Boyer et Emmanuel Laroche, Paris, C. Klincksieck (Impr. nationale), 1955
- Le Palais royal d'Ugarit III, Textes accadiens et hourrites des archives est, ouest et centrales, publié sous la direction de Claude F.-A. Schaeffer, avec des études de G. Boyer et E. Laroche, Paris, Imprimerie nationale, 1955
- Le Palais royal d'Ugarit, publié sous la direction de Claude F.-A. Schaeffer, ... III; Textes accadiens et hourrites des archives Est, Ouest et centrales, avec des études de Georges Boyer et Emmanuel Laroche, Paris, C. Klincksieck (Impr. nationale), 1955, 2de éd. 1956
- Le Palais royal d'Ugarit III, Textes accadiens et hourrites des archives Est, Ouest et Centrales, Paris, Klincksieck, 1955
- Extrait de Ugaritica V [Texte imprimé] : textes suméro-accadiens des archives privées d'Ugarit, Paris, 1968
- Mission de Ras Shamra dirigée par Claude F. A. Schaeffer, ... 12, Le Palais royal d'Ugarit, publié sous la direction de Claude F. A. Schaeffer 6, Textes en cunéiformes babyloniens des archives du grand palais et du palais sud d'Ugarit, Paris, P. Geuthner, 1970
- Rapport sur les travaux de l'École archéologique française de Jérusalem en 1970-1971 et 1971-1972 [Texte imprimé] : lu dans la séance de l'Académie des inscriptions et belles-lettres du 9 février 1973, Paris, éd. Klincksieck, 1973
- Rapport sur les travaux de l'École archéologique française de Jérusalem en 1972-1973 et 1973-1974 [Texte imprimé] : lu dans la séance de l'Académie des inscriptions et belles-lettres du 27 septembre 1974 (par M. Jean Nougayrol et André Parrot), Paris, éd. Klincksieck, 1974
- Le babylonien, langue internationale de l'Antiquité = Babilonščina, mednarodni jezik v antiki, Ljubljana, Slovenska akademija znanosti in umetnosti, 1975
- Les « silhouettes de référence » de l'haruspicine, Kevelaer, Butzon & Bercker, 1976
- La Mésopotamie, Paris, Bloud et Gay, 1965

== See also ==
- Amarna Letter EA2
