= Amarna letter EA 10 =

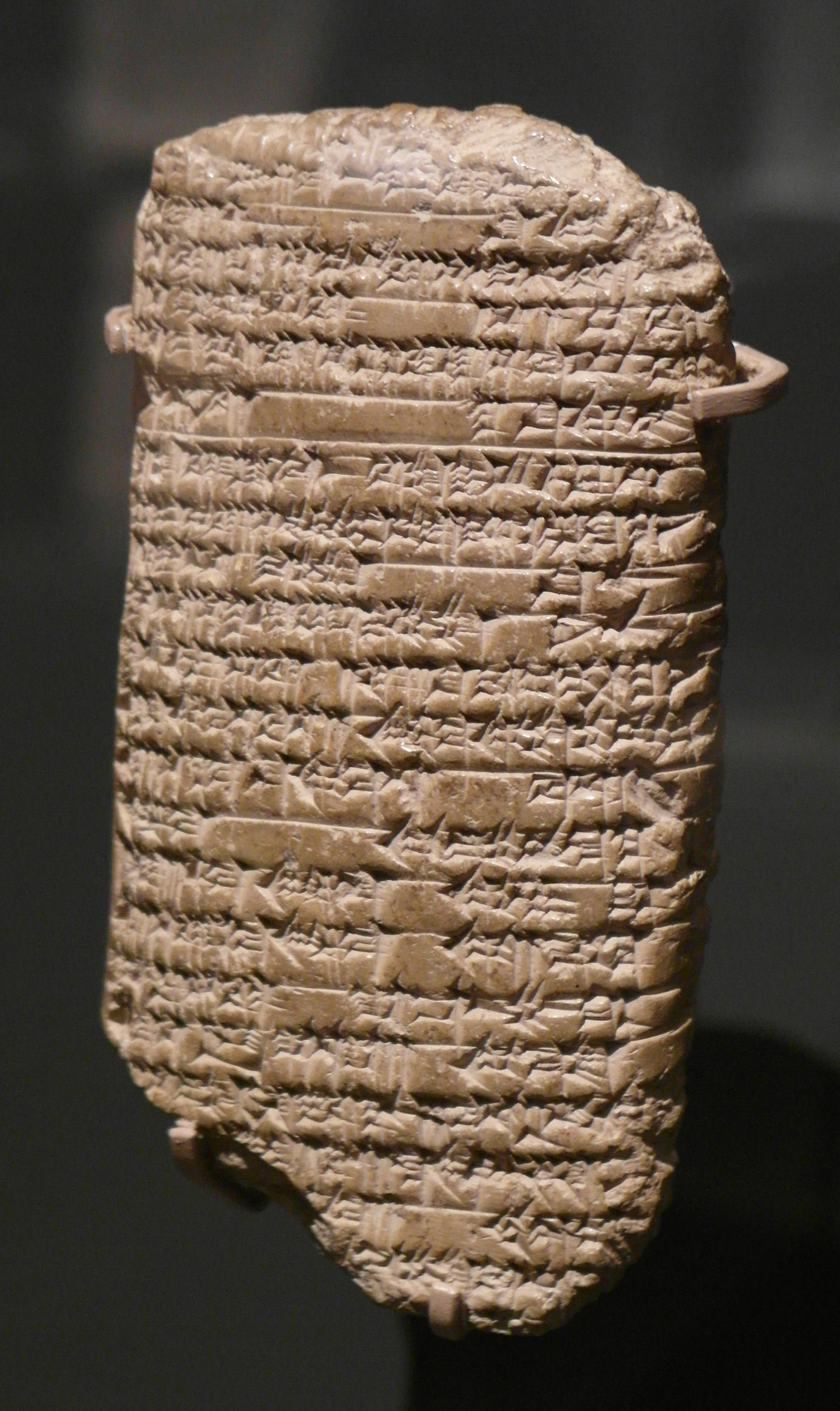
- Back of Amarna letter EA 10
- Material: Clay
- Created: c. 1350 BC
- Language: Akkadian

Amarna Letter EA10 (see here: ) is the letter of the Amarna series of diplomatic correspondence designated EA 10, which is written in cuneiform writing showing the continuation of a correspondence between king Burna-Buriash II, Babylon (named Karduniaš in the 1350 BC Amarna time period), and pharaoh Amenhotep IV of Egypt.

Some part of the contents of the letter indicates (in addition to EA11) that the Egyptian pharaoh married his daughters Meritaten and Ankhesenamun at a time when they were around 11 or 12 years old.

Within the letter, Burna-Buriash II praises the craftsmen of Egypt, and requests a model of an animal, either land or aquatic, and he is apparently indifferent to which of the two the pharaoh should choose to have created.

The letter is part of a series of correspondences from Babylon to Egypt, which run from EA2 to EA4 and EA6 to EA14. EA1 and EA5 are from Egypt to Babylon.

== The letter ==
=== EA 10: "Egyptian Gold and Carpenters" ===
EA 10, letter number five of six, from Karduniash (Babylon), by King Burna-Buriash II. (Not a linear, line-by-line translation.)

Obverse (see here: )

(Lines 1-7)–[Say t]o Naphu]rar[ey]a,^{1} the king of [Egypt: T]hus Burra-Buriyas, the king of Karad[uniyaš] . For me all goes wel[l]. For you, for your household, for your wives, fo[r your sons ], for your magnates, for your troops, for your chariots, for your horses, and for your country, may all go very well.

(8-24)–From the time of Karaindaš, since the messengers^{2} of your ancestors came regularly to my ancestors, up to the present, they (the ancestors) have been friends. Now, though you and I are friends, 3 times have your messengers come to me and you have not sent me a single beautiful greeting-gift, nor have I for my part sent you a beautiful greeting-gift. (I am one for whom nothing is scarce, and you are one for whom nothing is scarce.)^{3} As for your messenger whom you sent to me, the 20 minas of gold that were brought here were not all there. When they put it into the kiln, not 5 minas of gold appeared.^{4} [The ... th]at did appear, on cooling off looked like ashes. Was [ the gold ev]er identifi[ed] (as gold)?^{5} [ ... ] friends with e[ach other] [ ... ] ...

bottom

(25-28)–[ ... ]

reverse

(29-42)–[ ... ] of a wild ox for ... [ ... ]^{6} when your messenger ... [ ... ]^{7} let him bring to to me. There are skilled carpenters^{8} where you are. Let them represent a wild animal, land or aquatic, lifelike,^{9} so that the hide is exactly like that of a live animal. Let your messenger bring it to me. But if there are some old ones already on hand, then as soon as Šindišugab, my messenger, reaches you, let him immediately, posthaste, borrow chariot[s]^{10} and get here. Let them make some n[e]w ones for future delivery, and then when my messenger comes here with your messenger, let them bring (them) here together.

(43-49)–I send as your greeting-gift 2 minas of lapis lazuli, and concerning your daughter Mayati,^{11} having heard (about her), I send to her as her greeting-gift a necklace of cricket-(shaped) gems, of lapis-lazuli, 1048 their number. And when your messenger [ comes ] along with Šindišugab, I will make [ ... ] and have {it} brough[t to h]er.^{12} -- (complete EA 10, with many lacunae and bottom 3 lines missing on obverse, total lines 1-49)

== See also ==
- Amarna letters: EA 1, EA 2, EA 3, EA 4, EA 5, EA 6, EA 7, EA 8, EA 9, EA 11

== Ext links ==
- Obverse of letter (altered photographic width)
- CDLI entry of EA 10 (Chicago Digital Library Initiative )
- CDLI listing of all EA Amarna letters, 1-382
