= Amarna letter EA 223 =

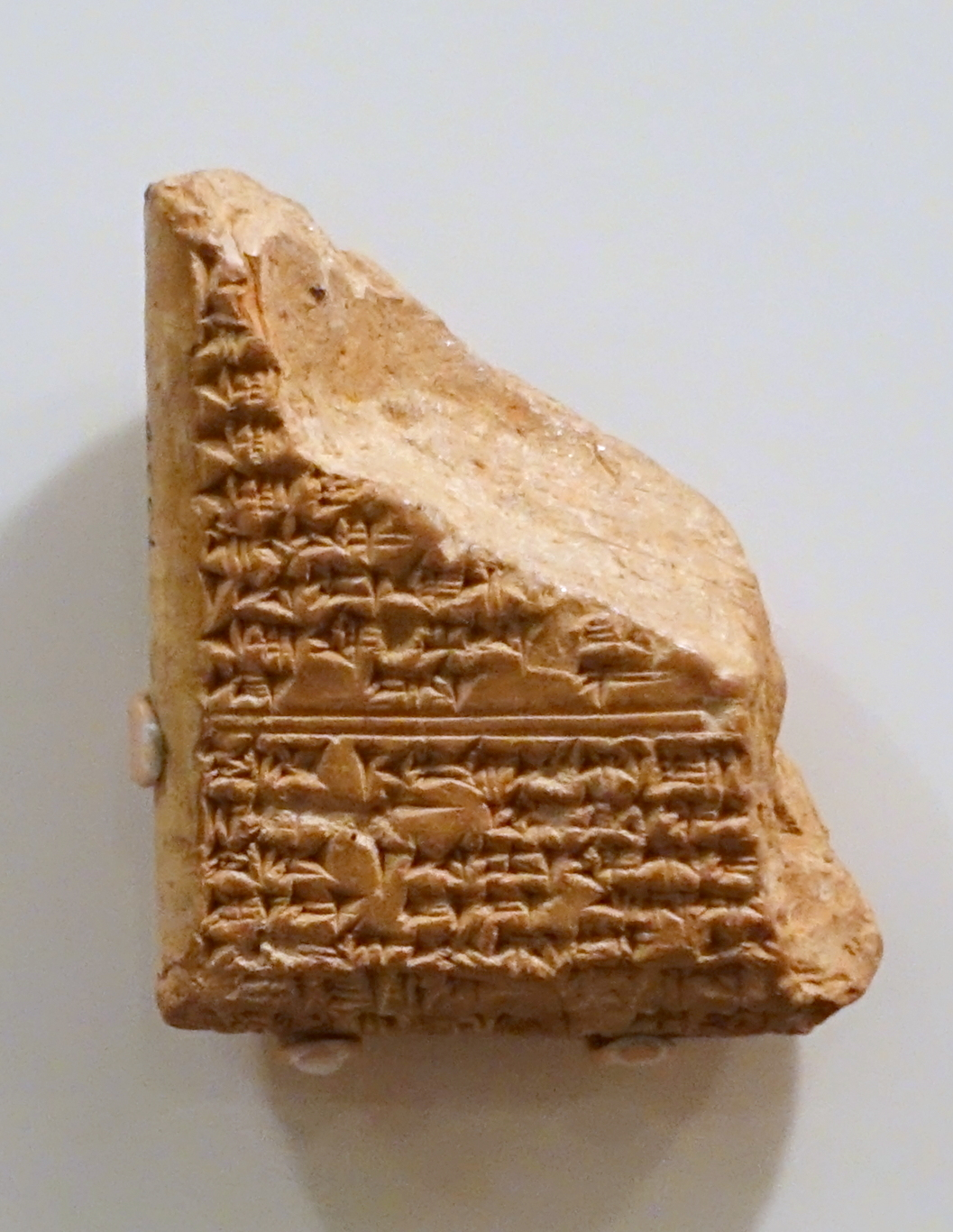
EA 26, fragment (Obverse). (high-resolution expandable photo)

Amarna letter EA 223, titled: "Compliance With Orders", is a very short clay tablet letter from Endaruta of city-state Akšapa (Achshaph). It is the only letter authored by Endaruta. One of the ten Pharaoh letters written to persons/ or states in the Amarna letters corpus, is Amarna letter EA 367 (titled: From the Pharaoh to a Vassal).

The Amarna letters, about 300, numbered up to EA 382, are a mid 14th century BC, about 1350 BC and 20–25 years later, correspondence. The initial corpus of letters were found at Akhenaten's city Akhetaten, in the floor of the Bureau of Correspondence of Pharaoh; others were later found, adding to the body of letters.

Letter EA 223 is numbered VAT 1870, from the Vorderasiatisches Museum Berlin.

== The letter ==
=== EA 223: "Compliance With Orders" ===
EA 223, letter number one of one, from Endaruta of city-state Akšapa. (Not a linear, line-by-line translation.)

Obverse See here ; line drawing,

(Lines 1-)–Say to the k[in]g, my lord, the Sun fr[om] the s[k]y: Message of En[d]a[r]u[t]a,^{1} your servant. I prostrate myself at the feet of the king, my lord, 7 times and 7 times.

(7-10)–Whatsoever the king, my lord, orders, I shall prepare.^{2} (complete EA 223, with minor lacunae restored, lines 1-10)

Reverse See here; (Only: upside-down script from Obverse), See here , and here:

== See also ==
- Amarna letters–phrases and quotations
- Amarna letter EA 367
