= Adda-danu =

Mayor of Gazru

Adda-danu (fl. c. 1340 BC) was the mayor or ruler of the city/city-state of Gazru-(modern Gezer, Israel) of the Amarna letters period, 1350-1335 BC. 'Adda' is the name of the Northwest Semitic god Hadad, and Adda-danu translates as: "Hadad (is the) Judge". Adda-danu is one of the three mayors who ruled Gazru in the 20–year Amarna letters correspondence, the others being Milkilu, and Yapahu.

Adda-danu is the author of one letter, EA 292, (EA for 'el Amarna'). The letter is entitled: "Like a pot held in pledge". It is of note that some of the 382 Amarna letters contain phrases, quotes, or parables and the title refers to, The Pot of a Debt.

== Amarna letter--no. 292 ==
=== Adda-danu's letter to pharaoh Amenhotep IV ===
Title: "Like a pot held in pledge"

Say to the king-(pharaoh), my lord, [my] go[d], my Sun: Message of Adda-danu, your servant, the dirt at your feet. I fall at the feet of the king, my lord, my god, my Sun, 7 times and 7 times. I looked this way, and looked that way, and there was no light. Then I looked towards the king, my lord and there was light. A brick may move from under its "partner-(brick)", still I will not move from under the feet of the king, my lord. I have heard the orders that the king, my lord, wrote to his servant, "Guard your commissioner, and guard the cities of the king, your lord." I do indeed guard, and I do indeed obey the orders of the king, my lord, day and night. May the king, my lord, be informed about his servant. There being war against me from the mountains, I built: b[a]-n[i]-t[i] –(banû: to create, build, generate) a house—its (the village's) name is Manhatu—to make preparations before the arrival of the archers of the king, my lord, and Maya has just taken it away from me and placed his commissioner in it. Enjoin Reanap, my commissioner, to restore my village to me, as I am making preparations before the arrival of the archers of the king, my lord. Moreover, consider the deed of Peya, the son of Gulatu, against Gazru, the maidservant of the king, my lord. How long has he gone on plundering it so that it has become, thanks to him, like a pot held in pledge. People are ransomed from the mountains for 30–shekels of silver, but from Peya for 100–shekels. Be informed of these affairs of your servant. -EA 292, lines 1-52 (complete)

Letter no. 1 of 5 from Yapahu-(of Gazru), also has the subject of: The pot of a debt. It is a short, 21-line, undamaged letter, entitled: "The sweet breath of the king". See: Yapahu.

=== Three quotes in letter no. 292 ===
A list of quotes from the letter:

1. 7 times and 7 times
2. A brick may move from under its partner, still I will not move from under the feet of the king, my lord. Used in letters EA 266, 292, and 296.
3. a pot held in pledge
4. Day and night, or "Night and Day" is used repeatedly. It is also used to refer to having to escape detection, and only enter into the cities at night.

== See also ==
- Amarna letters–phrases and quotations

== Resources ==
- Parpola, Simo, with Mikko Luuko, and Kalle Fabritius, The Standard Babylonian, Epic of Gilgamesh, The Neo-Assyrian Text Corpus Project,1997, (softcover, ISBN 951-45-7760-4); (Volume 1) in the original Akkadian cuneiform and transliteration; commentary and glossary are in English.

== Bibliography ==
- Moran, William L. The Amarna Letters. Johns Hopkins University Press, 1987, 1992. (softcover, ISBN 0-8018-6715-0)
