= DAGAL =

Cuneiform sign

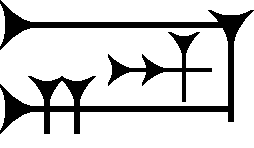
Cuneiform sign for DAGAL, a sumerogram. (In the Epic of Gilgamesh, also the cuneiform sign for sumerogram AMA.)

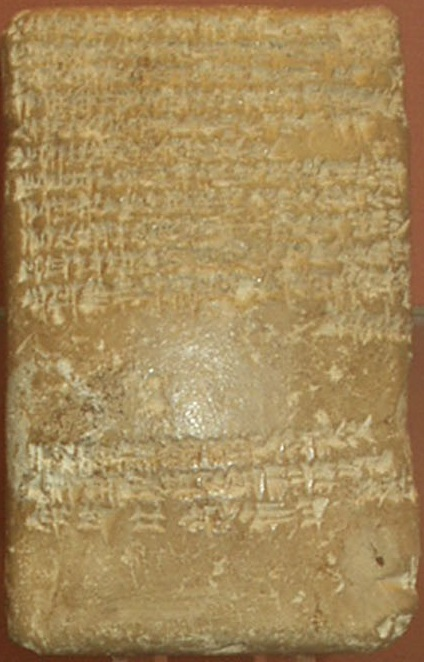
Amarna letter EA 9-(Reverse), Burna Buriash to Pharaoh, "Ancient Loyalties, New Requests". Use of DAGAL on obverse with "gold"-(KUG.GI), and "men-extensive"-(ṣābu-extensive): (lines 15-16), "...Now work temple to be much, since-(ul-tu), men extensive...." (Photo: not high resolution, and "out-of-focus".)

The cuneiform DAGAL sign, which is a capital letter (majuscule) Sumerogram with the Akkadian language meaning of to be wide, or extensive; also "many", Akkadian "rapāšu", is a minor usage cuneiform sign used in the Amarna letters and the Epic of Gilgamesh. An equivalent usage sign for DAGAL is used in the Amarna letters, gáb, for Akkadian language "gabbu", (for "many", "much", "all (of us)", etc.) and is found in such letters as EA 362, EA 367, and others. Gáb has other syllabic values, which are used for separate Akkadian word components.

DAGAL is an extremely rectangular-shaped sign; however its usage in EA 325, for supplying "extensive" provisions, then repeating after a list of six provisions, the sign is added a 2nd time. Both of the signs in EA 325 are identical, and are more 'angular'-(non-parallel horizontals) than rectangular. On the other hand, gáb is rectangular, but shorter than DAGAL, and has other syllabic uses. Gáb and DAGAL are easily identified by the 2-small-vertical strokes, located at the cuneiform sign – left, and are at various angles other than vertical (angled opposite, downward, to-the-left). The components (pictured as An, An (cuneiform)) at both sign's right, are less easily discernible, or are ligatured with the tall vertical stroke, that anchors the right side of the cuneiform sign. (Older version of DAGAL:.)

The more ancient use of "AMA", AMA.GI, sign used in Ama-gi. The star-(inside AMA) is an older use of the sign for 'god', DINGIR determinative, equivalent to the later use of "An", for DINGIR, as determinative.

In EA 9, the DAGAL sign is used many times in Paragraph (2); DAGAL is not as long, lengthwise as in EA 325. EA 9 is a complex story of only three paragraphs, but as the photo shows of the reverse (pictured above, last 2/3 of Paragraph (3)), the text is relatively compact. The text of EA 325 is a Canaanite text, with wide spaces, mostly, between individual cuneiform signs. EA 9's signs have spaces, but typically only between phrases, or as segue spacing-points of emphasis.

== Epic of Gilgamesh usage of "AMA" ==
In the Epic of Gilgamesh, the sign is also used for the sumerogram AMA, for Akkadian language "ummu", for "mother". The usage numbers for AMA, and DAGAL in the Epic are as follows: AMA-(15 times), DAGAL-(4). For the dictionary entry of umma in the Epic (Parpola, Glossary, 1971), there are 7 other spellings of umma which are syllabic/alphabetic; these are besides the common use of AMA, (mostly scribed with other alphabetics/syllables attached).

== See also ==
For AMA:

- Ama-gi
- Alan D. Eames#Beer anthropologist (clay tablets and Mesopotamian Gods, 4,000 BC)
- Ama-arhus

For DAGAL:

- Amarna letter EA 9
