= Amarna letter EA 2 =

Clay tablet containing a diplomatic marriage proposal between Babylonia and Egypt

Amarna Letter EA2 is the letter of the Amarna series of inscriptions designated EA2, which is inscribed with cuneiform writing showing the continuation of a correspondence between Kadašman-Enlil I and Amenḥotep III, from EA1. This letter is known to be concerning, A Proposal of Marriage. The letter is part of a series of correspondences from Babylonia to Egypt, which run from EA2 to EA4 and EA6 to EA14. EA1 and EA5 are from Egypt to Babylonia.

The composition of the matter of the tablet onto which the letter is inscribed is clay taken from the Euphrates.

Translations which exist which are made by Moran (1992) and Liverani (1999).

Jean Nougayrol thought this letter to be a lettre d'envoi. The letter reads (as translated by William L. Moran):

Say to Mimmuwareya, the king of Egypt, my brother: Thus Kadašman-Enlil, the king of Karaduniyaš. For me and my country all goes well. For you, for your wives, for your sons, for your magnates, your horses, your chariots, and your entire country, may all go very well.

With regards to my brother's writing me about marriage, saying, I desire your daughter, why should you not marry her? ... My daughters are available, but their husbands must be a king or of royal blood. These are the only ones I accept for my daughters. No king has ever given his daughters to anyone not of royal blood.

Your daughters are available, why have you not given me one?

...fine horses...20 wooden...of gold...120 shekels...I send to you as your greeting gift.60 shekels of lapis-lazuli I send as the greeting gift of your sister,...my wife

== See also ==
- Chronology of the ancient Near East
- Amarna letters: EA 1, EA 3, EA 4, EA 5, EA 6, EA 7, EA 8, EA 9, EA 10, EA 11
