= Amarna letter EA 1 =

The Amarna letter EA1 is part of an archive of clay tablets containing the diplomatic correspondence between Egypt and other Near Eastern rulers during the reign of Pharaoh Akhenaten, his predecessor Amenhotep III and his successors. These tablets were discovered in el-Amarna and are therefore known as the Amarna letters. All of the tablets are inscribed with cuneiform writing.

The letters EA1 to EA14 contain the correspondence between Egypt and Babylonia. Only two of them, EA1 and EA5, were sent from Egypt to Babylonia. The other twelve were written by Babylonians.

== The letter ==
The letter, also titled The Pharaoh complains to the Babylonian King, was written by the Pharaoh Amenhotep III to the King Kadašman-Enlil I. The tablet itself is made of Marl found near Esna.

Transliterations and translations were made by Rainey (1989-1990 and 1995 to 1996) and Cochavi-Rainey (1993) and translations were made by Moran (1992) and Liverani (1999).

== Translation ==
The letter includes the information:

My daughters who are married to neighbouring kings, if my messengers go there they speak with them, they send me a greeting gift. But the one with you is poor

The letter in its entirety is translated as (text in italics, apart from the address, is taken from the Moran translation, plain text from Rainey):

Speak to Kardasman-Enlil, king of the land of Karaduniash, my brother! Thus Nibmu'are'a, the great king, king of the land of Egypt, your brother. With me all is well: may all be well with you. With your house, with your wives, with your sons, with your senior officials, with your chariotry, (and) in the midst of your territories, may all be exceedingly well. With me all is well, with my house, my wives, my senior officials, my horses, my chariotry (and) <my> troops, it is all very well and within my territories it is all very well.

Now I have heard the message you sent to me concerning it, saying "You seek my daughter for your wife and my sister who my father gave to you is there with you but no one has seen her now, whether she is alive whether she is dead." (This) is what you sent me in your tablet; these are your words. When have you sent your dignitary who knows your sister, who can converse with her and identify her and let him converse with her?

The men who you send me are non-entities. One was the [...] of Zaqara, the other was an ass herd of the land of [...]. There was not one among them who [knows her] who was close to your father and [can identify her].

Moreover, as for the envoys that re[turned t]o you and [sai]d she is [not] your sister,[there was none a]mong the t[wo who knew her, and could tell you, m]ore[ver, she is well] and alive. Was there given [something] in[to his] hand in order to deli[ver it] to her mother?

And as for your writing, saying "You spoke to my envoys while your wives were assembled, standing before you, saying 'Behold your mistress who is standing before you' while my envoys did not recognise her, was it my sister who is like her? And now you wrote, saying "My envoys did not recognize her," and you say, "So who has identified her?" Why don't you send your dignitary who will tell you the truth, the welfare of your sister who is here? Then you can trust the one who enters in to see(!) her house and the relationship with the king.

And when you write saying:"Perhaps it was the daughter of some lowly person either one of the Kaskians or a daughter of the land of Khanigalbat, or perhaps of the land of Ugarit which my envoys saw. Who can trust those that she is like her? This one did not open her mouth. One can not trust them in anything." These are your words. And if yo[our sister is] dead then why would they conceal [her] de[ath and why] would we present anoth[er?... Surely the great god(?) Amon [knows your] sis[ter is alive!]

[I have appointed her si]ster to the que[en mother a]s the mistress of the house [...one] bride of [...].

[...] concerning all of [my] wives [...] which the kings of the land of Egyp[t...] in the land of E[gyp]t. And as you wrote saying, "As for my daughters who are married to kings they are neighbours, if my envoys go there, they converse with the m[ and they se]nd to me a present. The one that is thus [...]" These are your words. Perhaps the kings who are [your ne]ighbours are rich and mighty; your daughters acquire something with them and they send it to you, but what does she have, your sister who is with me? But as soon as she acquires something, then she will send it to you. Is it fitting that you give your daughters in order to acquire a garment from your neighbours?

And as for you citing the words of my father, leave it! Don't speak of his words! Moreover, "Establish friendly brotherhood between us." This is what you wrote; these are your words. Now, we are brothers, I and you, both of us, but I got angry concerning your envoys because they speak to you, saying, "Nothing is given to us who go to Egypt." Those who come to me, does one of the two go [without] taking silver, gold, oil, garments, everything nice [more than from] another country, but he speaks untruth to the one who sends him? The first time your envoy went off to your f[ath]er and there mouths were speaking untruths. The second time they went forth [and] they are speaking lies to you. So I myself said, "if [i gi]ve them something or if I don't give them, they will speak lies likewise," so I made up my mind about them; i did not gi[ve] them further.

And as you wrote, saying, "You said to my envoys, 'Has [your] master no troops? The girl he gave to me is not beautiful!' " These are your words. Not so! Your envoys are speaking untruths to you in this manner! If there are warriors or if there are not, it is known to me. Why is it necessary to ask him if you troops or if you have horses? No! Don't listen to your two envoys that you send here in whose mouths are lies! Perhaps they are afraid of you, so that they tell lies to escape your punishment?

As you spoke, saying, " He placed my chariots among the chariots of the city rulers, you did not review them separately! You humiliated them before the throng which is thus and(?) you did not rev[ie]w them separately." Verily the chariots are here; verily the horses of my country are here! All the chariot horses had to be supplied.

When you sent

to my hand a vessel to anoint the head of the girl, you sent to me one gift of pure oil. Are we to laugh?

== See also ==
- Amarna
- Amarna letters: EA 2, EA 3, EA 4, EA 5, EA 6, EA 7, EA 8, EA 9, EA 10, EA 11
- Amon
- Chronology of the ancient Near East
- Written communication and its historical development
- Karduniaš
- Zaqara
