= Canaano-Akkadian language =

Ancient Semitic language

Canaano-Akkadian
- Amarna Canaanite
- Region: Canaan
- Language family: Afro-Asiatic: Semitic; East and West Semitic; Akkadian and Central Semitic; Akkadian and Northwest Semitic; Akkadian and Canaanite; Canaano-Akkadian
- Writing system: Sumero-Akkadian cuneiform

Language codes
- ISO 639-3: None (mis)
- Glottolog: None

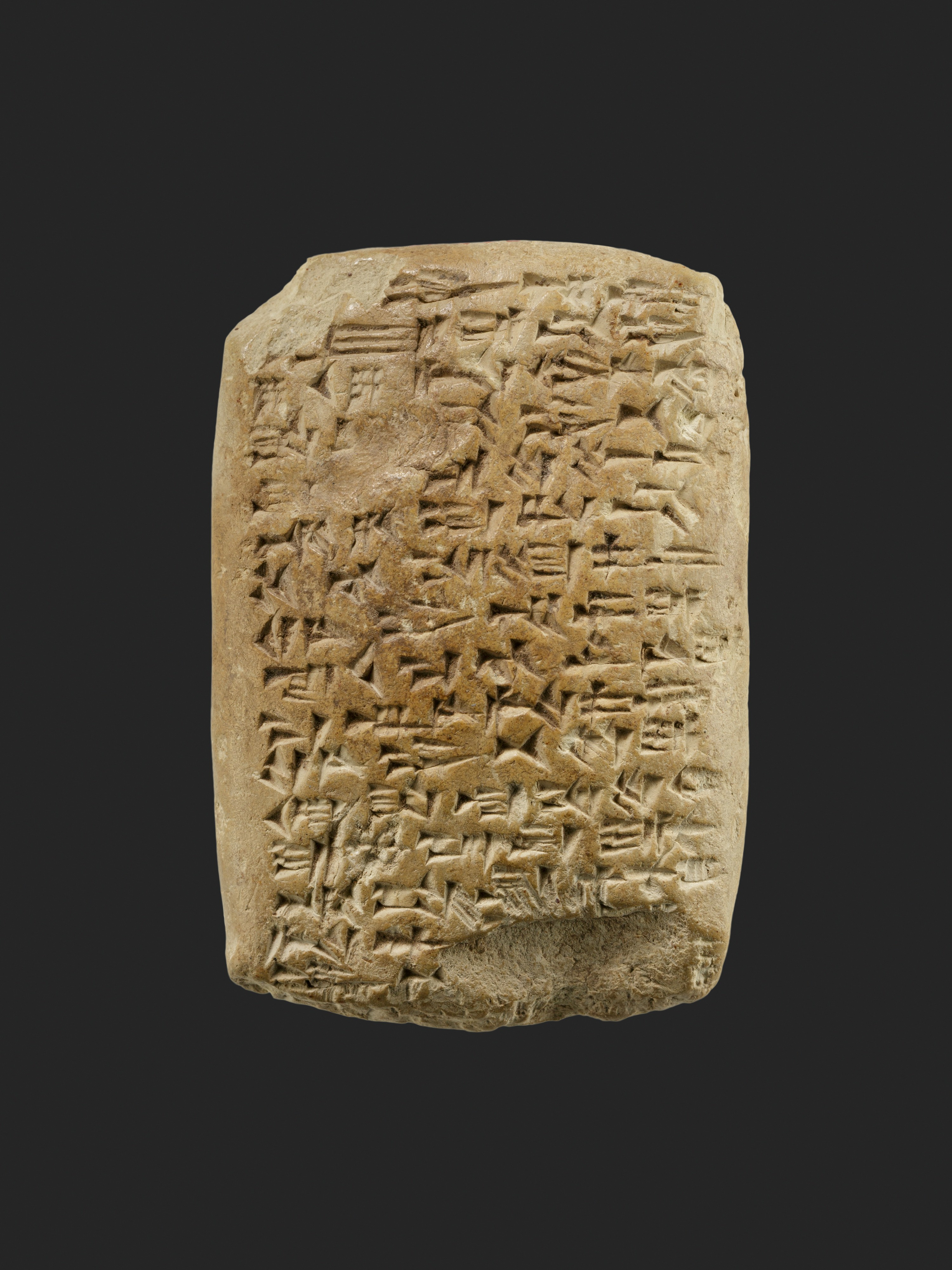
A letter from Abi-Milku of Tyre to the king of Egypt.

Canaano-Akkadian or Amarna Canaanite is an ancient Semitic language which was the written language of the Amarna letters from Canaan, Alashiya and Amurru. It is a mixed language with mainly Akkadian vocabulary and Canaanite grammatical features. It has been variously described as a Canaanite dialect of Akkadian, Canaanite coded in Sumero-Akkadian cuneiform and a purely scribal language.

== Linguistic features ==
Canaano-Akkadian combined the Akkadian lexicon with Canaanite grammar, which influenced the syntax and morphology of the language. As such, the hybridization manifested in numerous ways, including:

- Akkadian verbs were conjugated using Canaanite verb affixes, using the Akkadian term's 3MS form as the base.
- a change i > e, seen in Canaano-Akkadian edin, for Akkadian idin, "give!".
- elision of vowels between the root radicals r and b, seen in CA tîrbu for Akk. têrubu, "you enter".
- a change -Vn > -CV in words which end with the energic marker -(n)na followed by a suffix or enclitic participle, seen in CA ištimûš+šu for Akk. ištemun+šu, "I have heard it"; and CA nûbbalûš+šu for Akk. nubbalun+šu, "we must bring him".

== See also ==
- Kanbun
- Sadhu bhasha
