= Yapahu =

Ruler of the city-state of Gazru

Yapahu (fl. c. 1340 BC) was a mayor or ruler of the city/city-state of Gazru (modern Gezer) of the 1350-1335 BC Amarna letters correspondence. Two other possible mayors of Gazru during the Amarna letters period were Adda-danu and Milkilu.

Yapahu is the author of five Amarna letters to the pharaoh of Egypt, EA 297-300, and EA 378, (EA for 'el Amarna').

== 2 examples of Yapahu's letters ==
=== EA 297, title: "The sweet breath of the king" ===
"Say to the king-(i.e. pharaoh), my lord, my god, my Sun: Message of Yapahu, your servant, the dirt at your feet, I fall at the feet of the king, my lord, my god, my Sun, 7 times and 7 times. Whatsoever the king, my lord, has said to me, I have listened to with the greatest care. Moreover, I have become like a (bronze)–pot: sí-ri given in pledge, because of the Suteans. I have, however, just heard the sweet breath of the king. It has come forth to me, and my heart is very content." -EA 297, lines 1-21 (complete)

Adda-danu, another mayor of Gazru, had the same topic of a: Pot of a Debt. See letter: EA 292: Adda-danu, (title: Like a Pot held in Pledge).

=== EA 299, title: "A plea for help" ===
(1-11) "To the king, my lord, my god, the Sun, the Sun [f]rom the sky: Message of Yapahu, the ruler of Gazru (Gezer), your servant, the dirt at your feet, the groom of your horses. Truly, I fall at the feet of the king, my lord, my god, my Sun, the Sun from the sky, 7 times and 7 times, on the stomach and on the back.
(12-14) I have listened to the words of the messenger of the king, my lord, very carefully,-(MA-GAL, MA-GAL).
(15-21) May the king, my lord, the Sun from the sky, take thought for his land. Since the 'Apiru are stronger than we, may the king, my lord, (g)ive me his help, and may the king, my lord, get me away from the 'Apiru lest the 'Apiru destroy us." -EA 299, lines 1-21 (complete)

== List of Yapahu's letters ==
Letter no. 1 of 5—EA 297, title: "The sweet breath of the king"
Letter no. 2 of 5—EA 298, title: "A perfidious younger brother"
Letter no. 3 of 5—EA 299, title: "A plea for help"
Letter no. 4 of 5—EA 300, title: "A servant like his father"
Letter no. 5 of 5—EA 378, title: "All orders obeyed"

== See also ==
- Milkilu
- Adda-danu, (letter: Adda-danu, (letter: Like a Pot held in Pledge ))
- Amarna letters
- Amarna letters–phrases and quotations, phrase: "A pot held in pledge"
