= Amarna letter EA 5 =

Clay tablet containing diplomatic correspondence between Amenḥotep III and Kadašman-Enlil

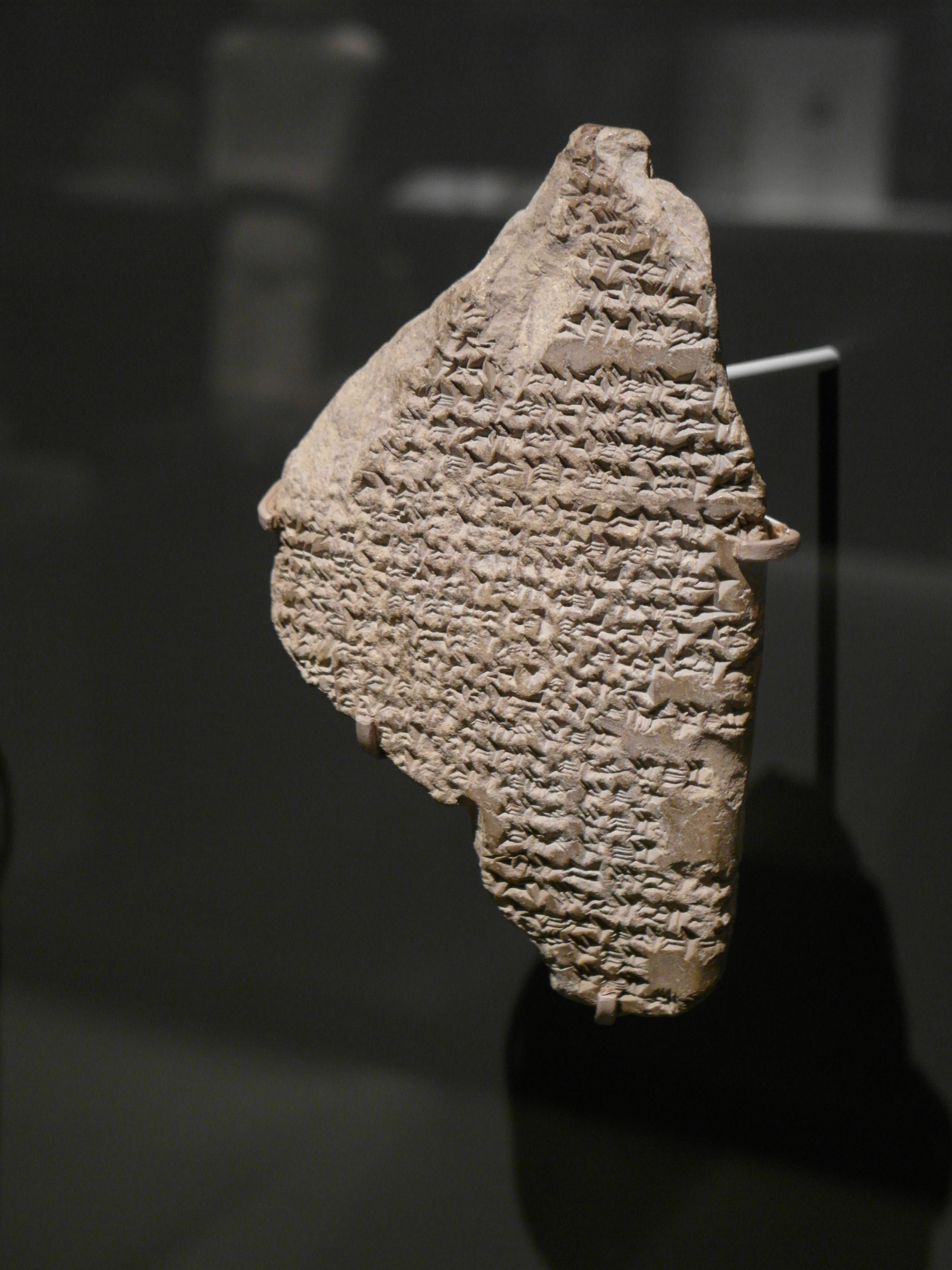
- The British Museum fragment
- Material: Clay
- Created: c. 1365 BC
- Present location: British Museum, United Kingdom and the Egyptian Museum, Egypt
- Identification: British Museum fragment: BM29787; Egyptian Museum fragment: C12195
- Language: Akkadian

Amarna Letter EA5, one of the Amarna letters (cited with the abbreviation EA, for "El Amarna"), is a correspondence between Kadashman-Enlil I and Amenhotep III.

The letter exists as two artifacts, one at the British Museum (BM29787) and one in the Egyptian Museum (C12195).

The letter is part of a series of correspondences from Babylon to Egypt, which run from EA2 to EA4 and EA6 to EA14. EA1 and EA5 are from Egypt to Babylon.

== The letter ==
=== EA 5: Gifts of Egyptian Furniture for the Babylonian Palace ===
EA 5, letter five of five, Amenhotep III to Kadashman-Enlil I. (Not a linear, line-by-line translation.)

Obverse: (see British Museum)

Paragraph 1

(Lines 1-12)--[Thus Nibmuar]ey[a^{1} Great King, the king of Egypt. Say to] Kadašman-Enlil, the king of Karadunniyaš,^{2} my brother: For m]e all goes (well). For you may all go well. For you]r [household, your] wives, [your sons, yo]ur [magnates], yo[ur] troops, [yo]ur [horses], your [chariots], and i[n your countries, may all go] well. [For me al]l goes well. For my household, [my] wives, [my sons], my magnates, my ma[ny] troops, my [horses], my chariots, and in [m]y [countries] all goes very, very well.

Paragraph 2

(Lines 13-33)--I have [just]^{3} heard that you have built some n[ew] quarters.^{4} I am sending herewith some furnishings for your house. Indeed I shall be preparing everything possible^{5} before the arrival of your messenger who is bringing your daughter. When^{6} your messenger returns, I will send (them) to [yo]u. I herewith send you, in the charge of Šutti, a greeting-gift of things for the new house: 1 bed^{7} of ebony, overlaid with ivory and gold; 3 beds of ebony, overlaid with gold; 1 uruššu of ebony, overlaid with gold; 1 lar[ge] chair [o]f ebo[ny], overlaid with gold.^{8} These things, the weight of all the gold: 7 minas, 9 shekels, of silver^{9} (In addition), 10 footrests of ebony; [ . . . ] of ebony, overlaid with gold; [ . . . ] footrests of ivory, overlaid with gold; [ . . . ] . . . of gold. [Total^{10} x] minas, 10 and 7 shekels, of gold.--(complete, lacunas throughout, lines 1-33)

== See also ==
- Chronology of the ancient Near East
- Amarna letters: EA 1, EA 2, EA 3, EA 4, EA 6, EA 7, EA 8, EA 9, EA 10, EA 11
- List of Amarna letters by size
  - EA 5, EA 9, EA 15, EA 19, EA 26, EA 27, EA 35, EA 38
  - EA 153, EA 161, EA 288, EA 364, EA 365, EA 367
