= Kadashman-Enlil I =

King of Babylon
- Reign: c. 1375 – c. 1360 BC
- Predecessor: Kurigalzu I
- Successor: Burna-Buriash II
- Died: c. 1360 BC

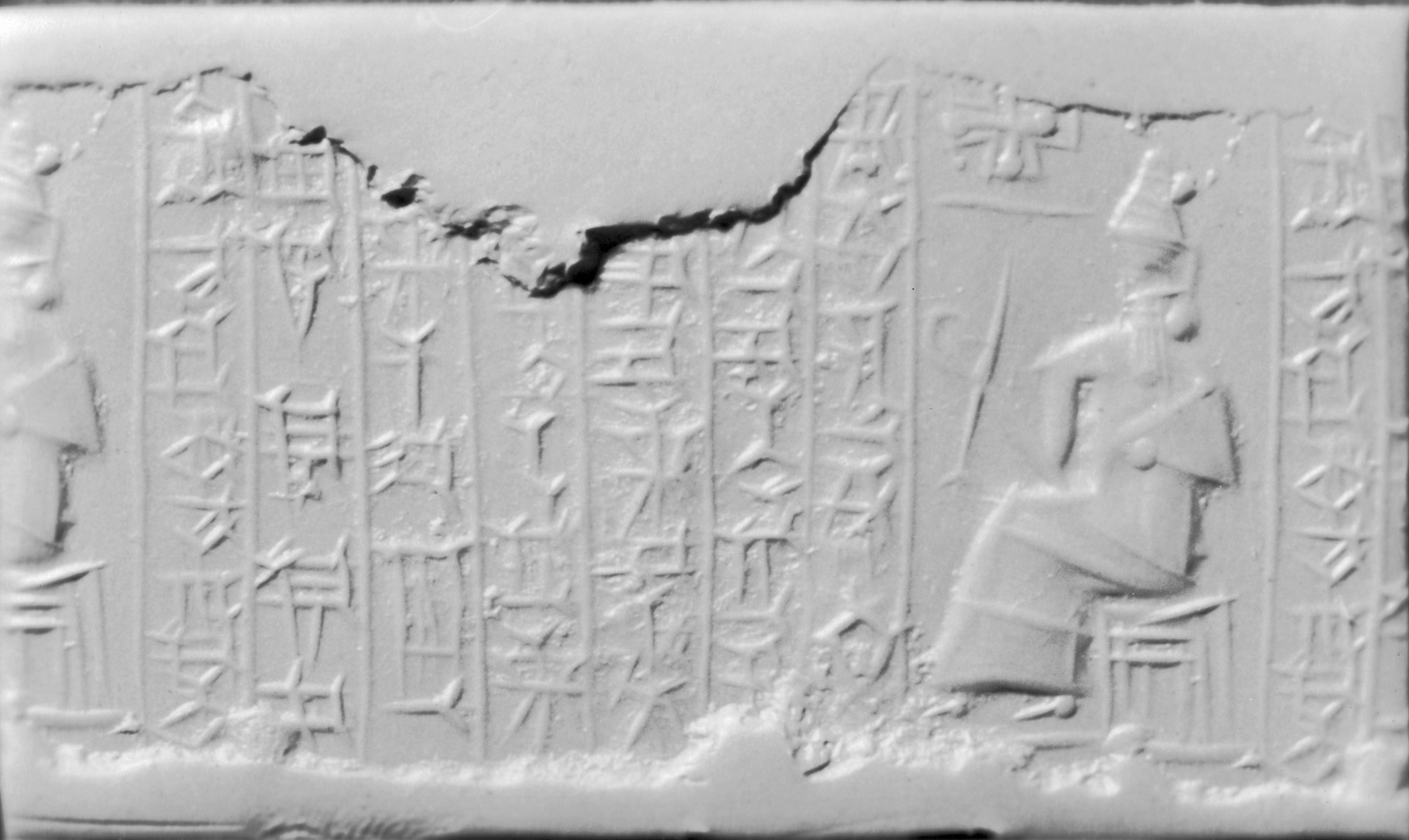
Cylinder seal-(modern rolled clay impression) bearing seven-line Sumerian inscription mentioning a [Ka]dašman-[( )]Enlil in the Walters Art Museum (Note: Cylinder Seal No. 42.619, in the Walters Art Museum, Baltimore.)

Kadašman-Enlil I (^{m}ka-dáš-man-^{d}EN.LÍL in contemporary inscriptions; died c. 1360 BC) was a Kassite King of Babylon from c. 1375 BC to 1360 BC, perhaps the 18th of the dynasty.

== Reign ==
=== Correspondence with Egypt ===
He is known to have been a contemporary of Amenhotep III of Egypt, with whom he corresponded (Amarna letters). This places Kadashman-Enlil I securely to the first half of the 14th century BC by most standard chronologies.

Five cuneiform tablets are preserved in the Amarna letters corpus. The letters designated EA (for El Amarna) 1 through 5 include three letters authored by Kadashman-Enlil I and two by Amenhotep III, who is addressed as and calls himself Nibmuareya, or variants thereof (from Neb-Maat-Ra).

In EA 1, (Note: Tablet EA 1, “The Pharaoh complains to the Babylonian King,” BM 029784 in the British Museum, CDLI ORACC transliteration) to Kadashman-Enlil I from Nibmuarea (Great King, the King of Egypt), he writes to assure Kadašman-Enlil that his sister, the daughter of Kurigalzu I, has not in fact died, nor had she been banished to a distant harem as a minor concubine, and to acknowledge the offer of one of Kadašman-Enlil’s daughters, to become, as yet another wife. He suggests Kadašman-Enlil dispatch a kamiru, tentatively translated as eunuch, to identify his sister, rather than the pair of envoys actually sent, on whom Amenhotep casts aspersions, describing one as a donkey-herder. The text is not entirely legible at this point, and the unfortunate envoy may actually be referred to as a caravan leader, and his companion a merchant, thus – these “nobodies” are merely common 'tradesmen' unfamiliar with the members of the royal household and thus unable to recognize Kadashman-Enlil Is sister.

In EA 2 (Note: Tablet EA 2, “Proposals of Marriage,” VAT 00148 + VAT 02706 in the Vorderasiatisches Museum Berlin CDLI ORACC Transliteration) from Kadashman-Enlil I to Mimmuwareya (King of Egypt), he declares “my daughters are available (for marriage).”

In EA 3, (Note: Tablet EA 3, “Marriage, grumblings, a palace-opening,” C. 4743, Cairo Museum, CDLI ORACC Transliteration) to [Nim]u'wareya (King of Egypt) from Kadašman-Enlil he feigns offence about being overlooked for an invite to the isinnu festival. Disarmingly, however, he invites his “brother” (Pharaoh Amenhotep III) to his own inauguration. ‘Now I am going to have a grand opening for the palace. Come yourself to eat and drink with me. I shall not do as you did!”

In EA 4, (Note: Tablet EA 4, “Royal deceit and threats,” VAT 01657 in the Vorderasiatisches Museum, CDLI, ORACC Transliteration) Kadašman-Enlil complains to the king of Egypt (no named preserved) about not being given one of his daughters as a wife, quoting an earlier response that “since earliest times no daughter of the king of Egypt has ever been given in marriage [to anyone]”. He urges that if he could not receive a princess, then a beautiful woman should be sent, but immediately follows up by proposing to exchange one of his own daughters for gold, needed to fund a building project he had in mind.

In EA 5, (Note: Tablet EA 5, “Gifts of Egyptian furniture for the Babylonian palace,” BM 029787 in the British Museum, + Cairo 4744, CDLI ORACC Transliteration) [Nibmuar]ey[a] (Amenhotep III) writes to detail the long list of gifts that will be provided in exchange for Kadashman-Enlil I’s daughter, and the deal is sealed.

=== Building works ===
Difficulties are encountered distinguishing between inscriptions belonging to Kadašman-Enlil I and his descendant Kadašman-Enlil II, who ruled around one hundred years later. Historians disagree on whether building inscriptions at Isin, for the Egalmaḫ of Gula, or in Larsa, on bricks bearing a sixteen-line inscription of the restoration of the Ebabbar temple for Šamaš, (Note: For example, brick L. 7078, in the İstanbul Arkeoloji Müzeleri.) should be assigned to the earlier King. The inscriptions from Nippur which include stamped bricks from the east stairway of the ziggurat and elsewhere describing work on the Ekur, the “House of the Mountain” of Enlil, four inscribed slab fragments of red-veined alabaster, (Note: Slabs CBS 19911-19914 in the University Museum, University of Pennsylvania.) a five-line agate cameo votive fragment, (Note: Votive fragment CBS 8674 in the University Museum, Philadelphia.) an engraved stone door socket, (Note: Door socket BM 121192 in the British Museum.) and so on, could be assigned in part to either King.

=== Length of reign ===
An economic tablet (Note: Tablet Ni. 437 in the Nippur collection at the İstanbul Arkeoloji Műzeleri.) from Nippur is dated “15th year (of) Kadashman-Enlil, month of Tašrītu, 18th day”, and is ascribed to him, rather than his descendant name-sake, because of the more archaic use of the masculine personal determinative before the royal name (the single vertical cuneiform stroke), and the likelihood that the later king reigned for no more than nine years. Another one refers to the 1st year of Burna-Buriash II and the 15th of the preceding king, presumed to be Kadashman-Enlil I.

His successor may have been his son, ascertained from an inscription on an irregular block of lapis lazuli (Note: Block BE I 68 i 5-15 in the İstanbul Arkeoloji Műzeleri.) found in Nippur and now housed in the İstanbul Arkeoloji Műzeleri, the considerably more well-known Burna-Buriash II, who also wrote several letters preserved in Egyptian archives to the Egyptian pharaoh (Amarna letters).
