= Endaruta =

Ruler of Achshaph

King of Achshaph
- Reign: c. 1340 BC

Endaruta (fl. c. 1340 BC) was the ruler of Achshaph-(Akšapa of the letters), in the 1350-1335 BC Amarna letters correspondence. Endaruta was the author of EA 223 (EA for 'el Amarna') of the letters. He is only referenced in two other letters EA 366 and 367, but EA 367, entitled: "From the Pharaoh to a vassal" is addressed to Endaruta, with instructions to guard his city. Pharaoh states Hanni–Khanni, is en route with the "archer-army force", and to prepare for their needs. Tablet-letter 367 is an undamaged, 25 line letter.

== The Amarna letters involving Endaruta ==
=== EA 367--title: "From the Pharaoh to a vassal" ===
Say to Endaruta, the ruler of Akšapa: Thus the king-(pharaoh). He herewith dispatches to you this tablet, (i.e. tablet-letter), saying to you, "Be on your guard. You are to guard the place of the king where you are.

The king herewith sends to you Hanni, the son of Maireya, the stable overseer of the king in Canaan. And what he tells you heed very carefully lest the king find fault in you. Every word that he tells you heed very carefully and carry out very carefully. And be on your guard! Be on your guard! Do not be negligent! And may you prepare before the arrival of the archers of the king–food in abundance, wine (and) everything else in abundance. Indeed he is going to reach you very quickly, (i.e. 'soon'), and he will cut off the heads of the enemies of the king.

And know that–"The King is: hale like the Sun in the sky. For his troops and his chariots in multitude all goes very well. —EA 367, lines 1-25 (complete)

The phrase: "Know that the king is hale like the Sun in the Sky" is a standard phrase used by the pharaoh, used in a short form (like this), and a long form. See: Amarna letters–phrases and quotations

=== EA 223--title: "Compliance with orders" ===
Say to the k[in]g, my lord, the Sun fr[om] the s[k]y: Message of En[d]a[r]u[t]a, your servant. I prostrate myself at the feet of the king, my lord, 7 times and 7 times. Whatsoever the king, my lord orders, I shall prepare. —EA 223, lines 1-10 (complete)

=== EA 366--Šuwardata's letter of his brothers aid ===
In letter EA 366, "A rescue operation", Šuwardata discusses the war with the Habiru, and the aid of his brother rulers. See: letter no. 8 of 8 by Šuwardata, entitled: "A rescue operation".

== See also ==
- Amarna letters
- Amarna letters–phrases and quotations
- Šuwardata
