= Amarna letter EA 369 =

Amarna letter EA 369 is a letter written on a clay tablet from the pharaoh to Milkilu of Gezer. The tablet is now housed in the Musées Royaux d'Art et d'Histoire, in Brussels. (Note: Object number E.6753.)

The letter is one of a small number of the Amarna Letters that were written in Egypt, and sent out from the pharaoh to vassals. Other Amarna letters sent to vassals included EA 99, 162, 163, 190, 367, and 370.

== The letter ==
The letter details the king sending female cupbearers, silver, linen garments, carnelian, precious stones, an ebony chair, with a total value of 160 deben. It also states that he is sending forty female cupbearers, which are recorded as 40 silver each. Some linguistic features of the letter indicate that the scribe also may have been of Gezer origin.

== Translation ==
The letter has been translated by Dossin (1934), Rainey (2014) and Moran (1992). Moran's (1992) translation is below:

To Milkilu, the ruler of Gazru: Thus the king. He herewith dispatches to you this tablet, saying to you, He herewith sends to you Hanya, the stable <overseer> of the archers, along with everything for the acquisition of beautiful female cupbearers:

9—14 silver, gold, linen garments : ma-al-ba-si, carnelian, all sorts of (precious) stones, an ebony chair; all alike, fine things. Total (value): 160 diban. Total: 40 female cupbearers, 40 (shekels of) silver being the price of a female cupbearer.

15—23 Send extremely beautiful female cupbearers in whom there is no defect, so the king, your lord, will say to you, “This is excellent, in accordance with the order he sent to you.”

24—32 And know that the king is hale like the Sun. For his troops, his ch[ariot]s, his horses, all goes very well. Aman has indeed put the Upper Land, the Lower Land, where the sun rises, where the sun sets, under the feet of the king.
