= Alan D. Eames =

Alan Duane Eames (April 16, 1947 – February 10, 2007) was an American writer and an anthropologist of beer who was described as the "Indiana Jones of Beer".

== Beer anthropologist ==
Eames acquired a reputation as the "Indiana Jones of beer" in reference to his global quest to learn about the origins of beer and the role it played in ancient societies and cultures. Eames visited 44 countries. In Egypt he found hieroglyphics about beer, and travelled on the Amazon River in search of a lost black brew. In the Andes, Eames trekked in search of a brew made from strawberries that were the size of baseballs.

With Professor Solomon Katz of the University of Pennsylvania, Eames formulated the theory that beer was an important factor in the creation of settled and civilised societies. Eames believed that beer was the most feminine of drinks, and thought that ancient societies considered it a gift from a goddess rather than a god, as from the gods Ama-Gestin and Ninkasis. Though not verified photographically or otherwise, Eames claimed to have found the world's "oldest beer advertisement" on a Mesopotamian stone tablet that dated to roughly 4000 B.C. Eames claimed that the tablet contained the tagline "Drink Elba, the beer with the heart of a lion." along with a depiction of a headless woman with large breasts holding goblets of beer in each of her hands.

== Life ==
Eames was born in Gardner, Massachusetts, the son of anthropologist, Warren Baker Eames. He graduated from Mark Hopkins College in Brattleboro, Vermont. Moving to New York City in 1968, he opened an art gallery, and began researching beer in the New York Public Library. In 1975, he acquired a store named Gleason's from Curt and Kay Gleason in Templeton, Massachusetts, in which he sold a large selection of beers. He also created and ran two branches of his Three Dollar Dewey's Ale House in Portland, Maine, and Brattleboro.

Eames was the founding director of the American Museum of Brewing History and Fine Arts in Fort Mitchell, Kentucky. Eames wrote seven books on beer and was a contributor to the Encyclopedia of Beer. Eames also broadcast about beer and advised film-makers on beer-related themes.

Eames stopped drinking beer eight years before his death, and died in his sleep of respiratory failure at his home in Dummerston, Vermont, in 2007. He was survived by his fifth wife, Sheila, his sons Adrian and Andrew, and his daughter Elena.

== Selected bibliography ==
- Ale Dreams (1986)
- A Beer Drinker's Companion: 5000 Years of Quotes and Anecdotes (1988) Harvard, Mass.: Ayers Rock Press.
- Secret Life of Beer: Legends, Lore, and Little-Known Facts (1995). Pownal, Vt.: Storey Communications. ISBN 978-0-882-66807-9
