= Amarna letter EA 4 =

Babylonian-era correspondence

Amarna Letter EA4 is a continuation of correspondence between Kadašman-Enlil I and Amenhotep III.

The letter is part of a series of correspondences from Babylonia to Egypt, which run from EA2 to EA4 and EA6 to EA14. EA1 and EA5 are from Egypt to Babylonia.

In a publication of the Moran translations, the letter is given the title Royal deceit and threats.

The letter translated reads:

...Moreover, you my brother when I wrote to you about marrying your daughter in accordance with your practice of not giving a daughter, wrote to me saying, 'From time immemorial no daughter of the King of Egypt is ever given to anyone' Why not. You are king you do as you please. Were you to give a daughter who would say anything. Since I was told of this message I wrote as follows to my brother saying 'Someone's grown daughters beautiful women must be available. Send me a beautiful woman as if she were your daughter. Who is going to say she is no daughter of the king. But holding to the decision you have not sent me anyone. Did you yourself not seek brotherhood and amity and so wrote to me about marriage that we might come closer to each other, and did not I for my part write to you about marriage for this very same reason, brotherhood and amity, that we might come closer to each other. Why then did my brother not send me just one woman. Should I perhaps since you did not send me a woman refuse you a woman just as you did to me and not send her. But my daughters being available I will not refuse to you.

Perhaps too when I wrote to you about marriage and when I wrote to you about the animals ... Now you need not accept the offspring of my daughter whom I shall send to you, but, send me any animals requested of you.

And as for the gold I wrote to you about, send me whatever is one hand as much as possible before your messenger comes to me right now in all haste this summer either in the month of Tammuz or in the month Ab so I can finish the work I am set upon. If during this summer in the months of Tammaz or Ab you send the gold I wrote to you about I will give you my daughter. So please send the gold you feel prompted to. But if in the months of Tammuz or Ab you do not send me the gold, and with it I do not finish the work I am engaged in what would be the point of your being pleased to send me gold. Once I have finished the work I am engaged in, what need have I of gold. Then you might send me 3000 talents of gold, but I would not accept it, I would send it back to you and not give you my daughter in marriage.

== See also ==
- Tammuz (Babylonian calendar)
- Ab
- Chronology of the ancient Near East
- Amarna letters: EA 1, EA 2, EA 3, EA 5, EA 6, EA 7, EA 8, EA 9, EA 10, EA 11
