= Amarna letter EA 3 =

14th-century BCE Egyptian clay tablet

Amarna Letter EA3 is a letter of correspondence between Nimu'wareya, this being the ruler of Egypt, Amenḥotep III, and Kadašman-Enlil, the king of Babylon. In the Moran translation, the letter is given the cursory or synoptic title Marriage, grumblings, a palace opening. The letter is part of a series of correspondences from Babylonia to Egypt, which run from EA2 to EA4 and EA6 to EA14. EA1 and EA5 are from Egypt to Babylonia.

The contents of the letter is as follows:

Say to Nimu'wareya, the king of Egypt, my brother: Thus Kadašman-Enlil, the king of Karaduniyaš, your brother. For me all indeed goes well. For you, for your household, your wives, and for your sons, your country, your chariots, your horses, your magnates may all go very well.

With regards to the girl, my daughter, about who you wrote to me in view of marriage, she has become a woman; she is nubile. Just send a delegation to fetch her. Previously my father would send a messenger to you and you would not detain him for very long. You quickly sent him off, and you would also send to my father here a beautiful greeting gift.

But now when I sent a messenger to you you have detained him for six years and you have sent me as my greeting gift the only thing in six years 30 minas of gold that looked like silver. That gold was melted down in the presence of Kasi your messenger and he was a witness. When you celebrated a great festival you did not send your messenger to me saying "Come to eat and drink" Nor did you send my greeting gift in connection with the festival. It was just 30 minas of gold that you sent me. My gift does not amount to what I have given you every year.

I have built a new house. In my house I have built a large...Your messengers have seen inside the house and the..., and are pleased. Now I am going to have a house opening. Come yourself to eat and drink with me. I shall not act as you yourself did. 25 men and 25 women, 50 altogether in my service I send in connection with the house opening.

...for 10 wooden chariots, and 10 teams of horses I send to you as your greeting gift.

== See also ==
- Chronology of the ancient Near East
- Amarna letters: EA 1, EA 2, EA 4, EA 5, EA 6, EA 7, EA 8, EA 9, EA 10, EA 11
