= Amarna letter EA 11 =

14th-century royal correspondence

Amarna letter EA11 is a letter of correspondence to Akhenaten of Egypt from the king of Babylon, Burna-Buriash II.

The tablet onto which letter EA11 is inscribed is badly damaged.

The letter content suggests of the place Amarna having experienced an epidemic of some kind of plague.

The letter (together with letter EA10) has been used to argue that Akhenaten married his daughters Meritaten and Ankhesenpaaten at a time when they were both 11 or 12 years of age. Meritaten is described as the mistress of the royal house within the text.

The letter is part of a series of correspondences from Babylonia to Egypt, which run from EA2 to EA4 and EA6 to EA14. EA1 and EA5 are from Egypt to Babylonia.

== See also ==
- Amarna letters: EA 1, EA 2, EA 3, EA 4, EA 5, EA 6, EA 7, EA 8, EA 9, EA 10
