= Amarna letter EA 6 =

Clay tablet containing diplomatic correspondence between Burra-Buriyaš to Nimmuwarea

Amarna Letter EA6 is a correspondence from Burra-Buriyaš to Nimmuwarea(Amenhotep III) the king of Egypt.

According to one source, this letter concerns gifts between two kings.

The letter is part of a series of correspondences from Babylonia to Egypt, which run from EA2 to EA4 and EA6 to EA14. EA1 and EA5 are from Egypt to Babylonia. The inscription is translated as follows:

Say to Nimmuwarea the king of Egypt my brother Thus Burra-Buriyaš the king of Karaduniyaš your brother For me all goes well For you your household your wives your sons your country your magnates your horses your chariots may all go well.

Just as previously you and my father were friendly to one another you and I should be friendly to one another Between us anything else what-so-ever is not to be mentioned.Write to me for what you want from my country so that it may be taken to you and I will write to you of what I want from your country so that it may be taken to me...I will trust you...Write to me so that it may be taken to you, And as your greeting gift... and 1 ... I send you

== See also ==
- Amarna letters: EA 1, EA 2, EA 3, EA 4, EA 5, EA 7, EA 8, EA 9, EA 10, EA 11
- Bi (cuneiform)
- De Beneficiis
