= Amarna letter EA 7 =

Egyptian letter of correspondence

Amarna Letter EA7 is a letter of correspondence between Napḫurureya, king of Egypt, and Burra-Buriyaš the king of Karaduniyaš, and is part of a series of correspondences from Babylonia to Egypt, which run from EA2 to EA4 and EA6 to EA14. EA1 and EA5 are from Egypt to Babylonia.

The letter demonstrates the existence of Middle Eastern trade routes through The Levant.

The artifact is no longer extant having been destroyed during a bombing raid upon the city of Berlin, during World War II.

William L. Moran gave EA7 the title A lesson in geography.

The letter reads (translation by Oppenheim):

Say to Napḫurureya, king of Egypt, my brother Thus Burra-Buriyaš Great king the king of Karaduniyaš your brother For me and my household and my horses and my chariots and my magnates and my country all goes very well For my brother and his household and his horses and his chariots and his magnated and his country may all go very well

From the time the messenger of my brother arrived here, I have not been well, and so on no occasion has his messenger eaten or drank spirits in my company If you ask ... your messenger he will tell you I have not been well and as far as my recovery is concerned I am still by no means restored to health Furthermore since I was not well and my brother showed me no concern I for my part became angry with my brother saying 'Has my brother not heard that I am ill Why has he shown me no concern Why has he sent no messenger here and visited me' My brother's messenger addressed me and said 'It is not a place close by for him to hear about you and send you greetings The country is far away Who is going to tell your brother so he might immediately send you greetings Would your brother hear that you are ill and still not send you his messenger I for my part addressed him as follows 'For my brother a Great king is there really a far away country and a close-by one He for his part addressed me as follows 'Ask your own messenger whether the country is far away and as a result your brother did not hear about you and did not send anyone to greet you' Now since I asked my own messenger and he said to me that the journey is far I was not angry any longer I said no more Furthermore as I am told everything in my brothers country is there and he wants for nothing Furthermore in my country everything is available and I want for absolutely nothing also We have however inherited good relations of long standing from earlier kings and so we should send greetings to each other It is these same relations that shall be lasting between us My greetings I shall send to you and your greetings you shall send to me ... My greetings ... and your greetings ... You now before escorting him on his way have detained my messenger for two years I informed your messenger and sent him on his way Inform my messenger immediately so he may come to me Furthermore as I am also told the journey is difficult water cut off and the weather is hot I am not sending many beautiful greeting-gifts I send to my brother four minas of lapis-lazuli as a routine greeting-gift In addition I send my brother five teams of horses As soon as the weather improves my next messenger to come I will have bring many beautiful greeting-gifts to my brother Furthermore whatever my brother wants let him just write to me so it might be taken from the house Being engaged on a work I write to my brother May my brother send me much fine gold to use on my work But the gold my brother sends me my brother should not turn over into the charge of any deputy My brother should make a personal check then my brother should seal and send it to me Certainly my brother did not check the earlier gold sent by my brother to me It was only a deputy of my brother who sealed and sent it to me When I put the 40 minas of gold that was brought to me into a kiln not even 10 I swear appeared Furthermore twice has a caravan of Ṣalmu my messenger whom I sent to you been robbed The first one Biriyawaza and his second caravan Pamaḫu a governor of yours in a vassalage robbed When is my brother going to adjudicate this case? As my messenger spoke before my brother so may now Ṣalmu speak before my brother His things should be restored to him and he should be compensated for his losses

== See also ==
- Amarna letters: EA 1, EA 2, EA 3, EA 4, EA 5, EA 6, EA 8, EA 9, EA 10, EA 11
