= Amarna letter EA 8 =

Amarna Letter EA8 is a continuation of correspondence between Napḫurureya, king of Egypt, and Burra-Buriyaš the king of Karaduniyaš.

Within the Moran edition, the letter is translated by Ebeling.

The letter is written in the language Akkadian, and dates to a period circa 1349 to 1334 B.C., The letter is part of a series of correspondences from Babylonia to Egypt, which run from EA2 to EA4 and EA6 to EA14. EA1 and EA5 are from Egypt to Babylonia.

The inscription reads:

Say to Napḫurureya, king of Egypt, my brother Thus Burra-Buriyaš Great king the king of Karaduniyaš your brother For me all goes well For you your country your household your wives your sons your magnates your horses your chariots may all go very well.

My brother and I made a mutual declaration of friendship and this is what we said 'Just as our fathers were friends with one another so will we be friends with one another Now my merchants who were on their way with Aḫu-ṭabu were detained in Canaan for business matters After Aḫu-ṭabu went on to my brother in Ḫinnatuna of Canaan Šum-Adda the son of Balumme and Šutatna the son of Šaratum of Akka having sent there men killed my merchants and took away their money I send ... post haste Inquire of him so that he may inform you Canaan is your country and its kings are your servants In your country I have been despoiled Bring them to account and make compensation for the money they took away Put to death the men who put my servants to death and so avenge my blood And if you don not put these men to death they are going to kill again be it a caravan of mine or your own messengers and so messengers between us will there-by be cut-off And if they try and deny this to you Šum-Adda having blocked the passage of one man of mine retained him in his company and another man having been forced into service by Šutatna of Akka is still serving him These men should be brought to you so you can investigate inquire whether they are dead and thus become informed As a greeting gift I send to you one mina of lapis-lazuli Send off my messenger immediately so I may know my brother's decision Do not detain my messenger Let him be off to me immediately

== See also ==
- Amarna letters: EA 1, EA 2, EA 3, EA 4, EA 5, EA 6, EA 7, EA 9, EA 10, EA 11
