= Achshaph =

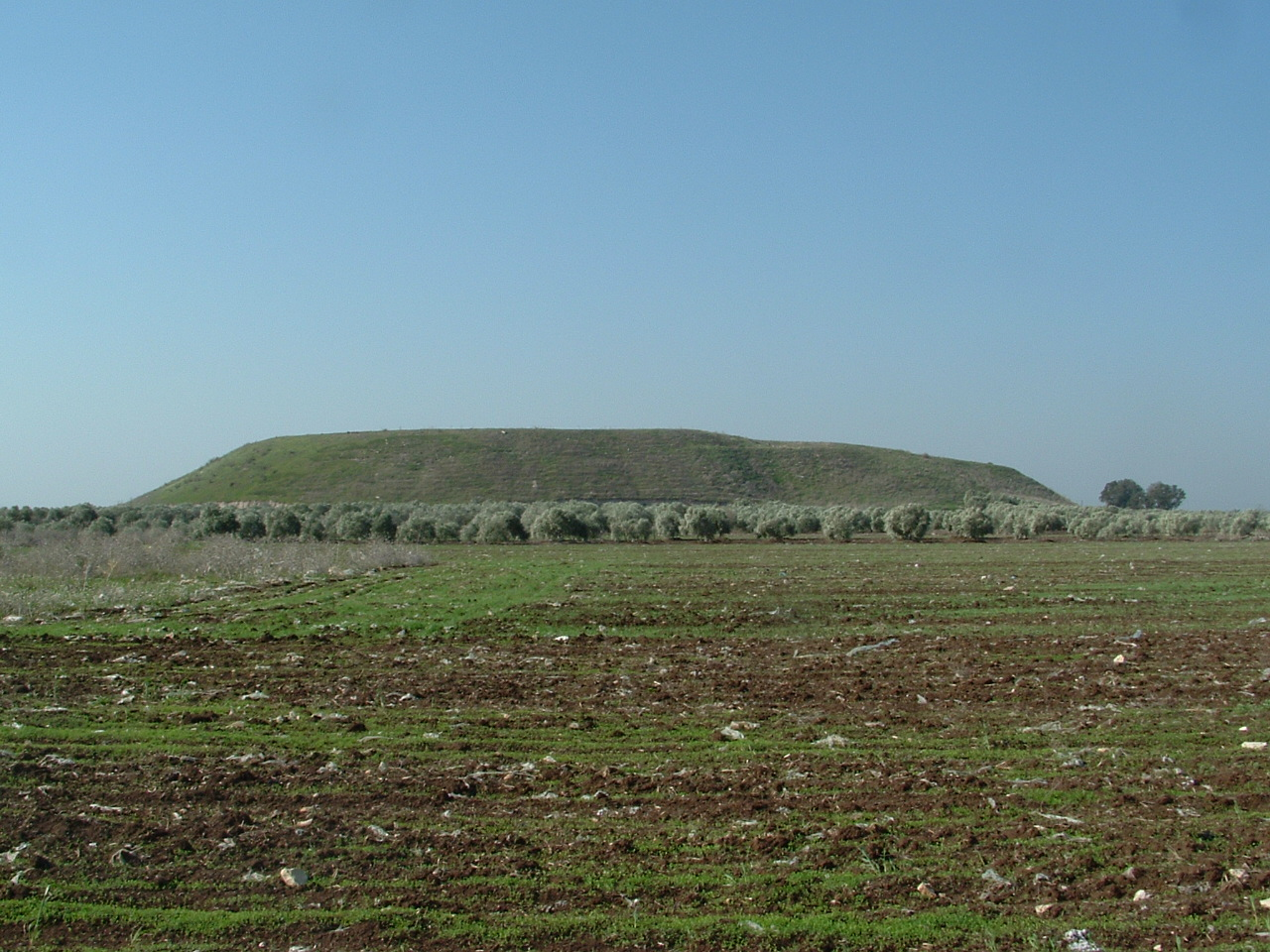
Tel Keisan, possible location of Achshaph

Achshaph (Hebrew: אַכְשָׁף; in LXX Ancient Greek: Άξείφ or Άκσάφ) was a royal city of the Canaanites, in the north of Canaan (Josh. 11:1; 12:20; 19:25). The name means "sorcery".

== Location ==
Achshaph was in the eastern boundary of the tribe of Asher. There are several opinions as to its exact location, including Tell Keisan, Tell Regev, Tell Harbaj and Tell an-Nakhl. In the Greek Septuagint, in various manuscripts, depending on the passage, its name is given in the forms Azeiph, Achsaph, Achas, Keaph, Achiph, Acheib, and Chasaph.

== History ==
M17 A2 V31 O34 Q3 D12 or M17 A2 V31 O34 Q3 D12 N25
jksp
in hieroglyphs
Era: New Kingdom
(1550–1069 BC)

The 1350 BC Amarna letters has Endaruta as the 'mayor' of Akšapa (Achshaph). In this time period, the Habiru are attacking city-states, and Abdi-Heba of Jerusalem, Surata of Acco, Šuwardata of Qiltu (?), and Endaruta are aiding each other.

Only one extremely short letter—EA 223 (EA-el Amarna)—is written from Endaruta of Akšapa, and it is a one sentence topic: [following a short 3-sentence formal-formulaic introduction] ... "Whatever the king (i.e., pharaoh), my lord, orders, I shall prepare."

But one perfectly preserved letter from Pharaoh, to Endaruta of Akšapa is known, EA 367. Its topic is to guard (and defend) Akšapa and to prepare for "troop arrivals"-(the archer-forces).

The third and only other reference in the Amarna letters corpus is from letter EA 366 (from Šuwardata of Qiltu (?)), and the letter states:

"...only 'Abdi-Heba and I have been at war with that 'Apiru. Surata, the ruler of Akka, and Endaruta, the ruler of Akšapa, these two also came to my aid, ..."

== See also ==
- Endaruta
- Amarna letters
- Amarna letters–localities and their rulers
