= Greeting-gift (Shulmani) =

The greeting-gift (Šulmānī) were gifts, or presents exchanged between Kings, and rulers of the 1350 BC–1335 BC Amarna letters correspondence. They are notable in the 382–letter corpus for the variety of the gifts, as well as the involvement of the individuals exchanging the gifts, (their motives).

The "greeting-gifts" were "peace-offerings" between the rulers, and were a function of intrigues, and country/political relationships, or regional 'country'/kingdom relationships.

An example of a discussion of a greeting-gift exchange can be found at one of the authors of the Amarna letters, Zita (Hittite prince). Letter EA 44 is presented, (EA for 'el Amarna'), as an example of the term's usage.

Other notable exchanges of greeting-gifts were with Tushratta of Mittani, Assyria, the King of Ugarit-(letter EA 49, by Niqmaddu II), and the King of Babylon.

== See also ==
- Amarna letters
- Zita (Hittite prince)
