= William L. Moran =

American historian (1921–2000)

William Lambert Moran (August 11, 1921 – December 19, 2000) was an American Assyriologist.

== Life ==
Moran was born in Chicago, United States.

In 1939, Moran joined the Jesuit order. He then attended Loyola University in Chicago, where he received his B.A. in 1944. After this, he taught Latin and Greek in a high school in Cincinnati between 1946 and 1947. He resumed his studies at Johns Hopkins University and gained his Ph.D. in 1950. After further studies he worked on the "Chicago Assyrian Dictionary", and in 1955 he taught biblical studies at the Pontifical Biblical Institute in Rome between 1958 and 1966.

In 1966, he took the position as professor of Assyriology at Harvard University, and was respected as a rigorous and learned teacher of the Akkadian language who could easily discuss problems in Biblical lexicon and literature. He was married to Suzanne Drinker in 1970. In 1985, he was appointed Andrew W. Mellon Professor of the Humanities Emeritus, and in 1996 he was made a Fellow of the American Academy of Arts and Sciences.

He retired in 1990, and moved to Brunswick, Maine, where he died in 2000. In 2005, a 224-page book titled 'Biblical and Oriental Essays in Memory of William L. Moran,' edited by Agustinus Gianto for Biblica et Orientalia 48 was published by Roma: Pontificio Istituto Biblico to honor his career and memory.

== Publications ==
His doctorate, under W. F. Albright, studied Canaanite glosses in the Amarna letters and was significant for the understanding of biblical Hebrew. Other significant publications include the standard translation and commentary of "The Amarna Letters" in 1992. These texts document the international and imperial correspondence of the Egyptian Pharaohs around the time of the Egyptian kings Amenhotep III, Akhenaten and Tutankhamun in the middle of 14th century BC. Many other journal articles concerned illuminating studies of Akkadian literature, including the Gilgamesh Epic.
