= Amarna letter EA 9 =

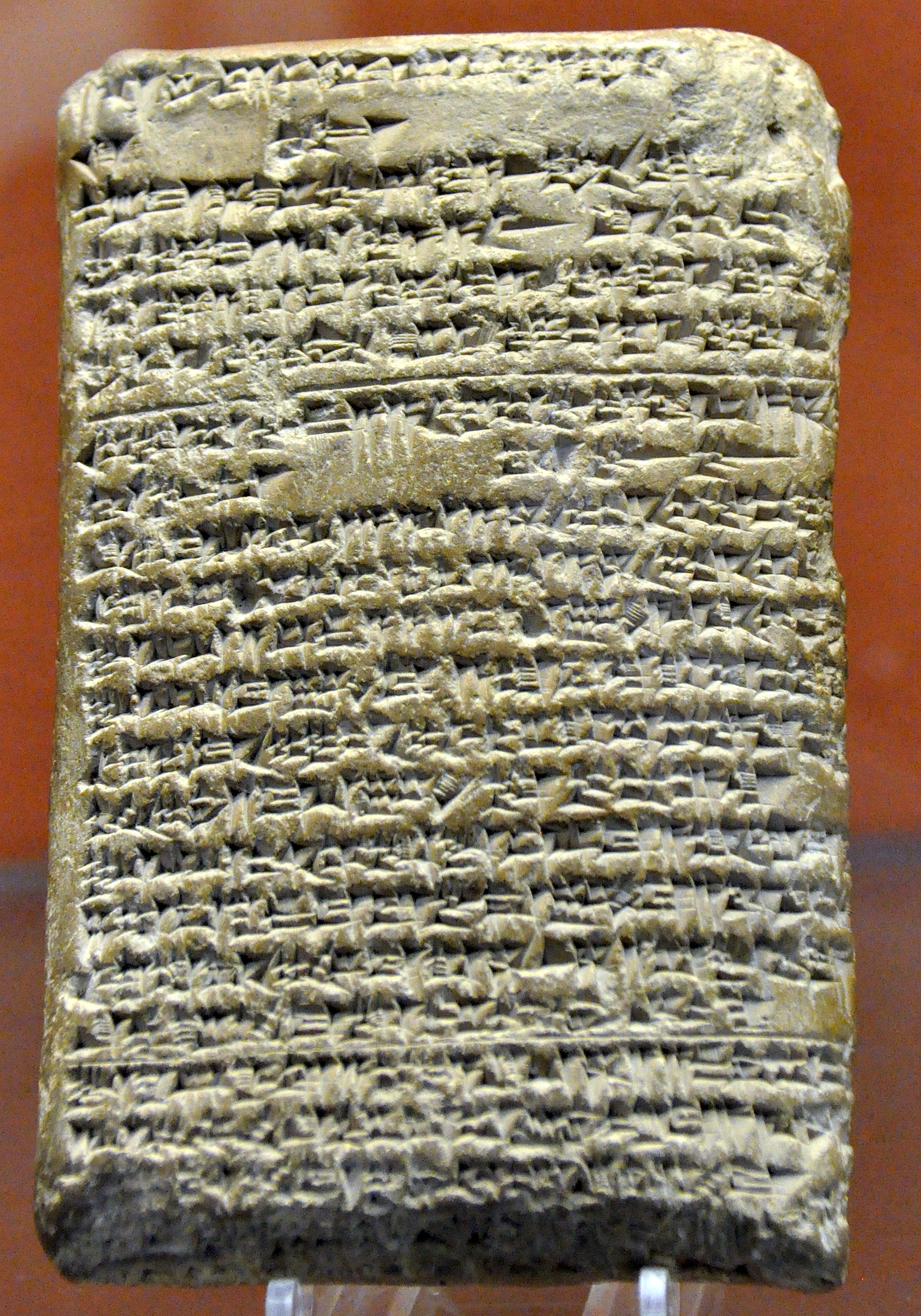
- Material: Clay
- Height: 14.6 cm
- Width: 9.84 cm
- Created: c. 1345 BC
- Discovered: Minya, Egypt
- Present location: British Museum, England, United Kingdom
- Language: Akkadian

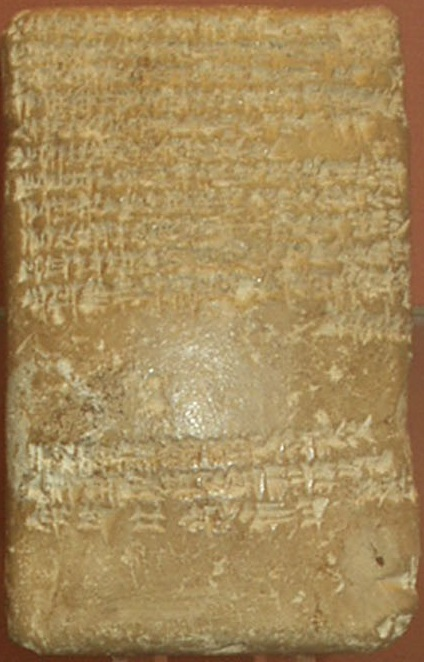
Back of the letter

Amarna letter EA 9 is a tall, compact 38 line (capable of 55 lines) clay tablet letter of 3 paragraphs, in pristine condition, with few flaws on the clay.

The letter is from King Burna-Buriash II of Babylon (furthest country writing to Egypt) and is to the Pharaoh of Egypt (Egypt named Misri at Amarna letters time). Of note, the Pharaoh is named Neb-Kheper-Ra, (meaning King-Manifested-Ra), (King-transformed-(as)-Ra), and is spelled in cuneiform signs, Né-(ni)-eB iK-Pa-Ri, Ri-(iya), for "Neb-Kheper-Ra-(mine)", "(My) King, manifested Ra".

The introductory, and salutory Paragraph highlights, peace (šalāmu-shu-ul-mu) for King Burna-Buriash II, and wishes peace, and well-being to the Pharaoh, and on the many contingents of the Pharaoh's charge, wife, army, the country, etc.

Paragraph 2 highlights the need for gold, for building a mausoleum for Burnaburiash's father, and is an involved paragraph discussing the ancestor father-king's relationships, and the desire for continued good relations, and the exchange of peace gifts between the 'brother kings'.

Paragraph 3 highlights the intrigues of economic and country relationships. Ascending country emissaries, and the vying for trade, and economic trading rights. A dialogue is contained in the paragraph, between the history, and what Burnaburiash would like to see done in the future.

The Amarna letters, around 300, numbered up to EA 382, are a mid 14th century BC, around 1350 BC and 20 years later, correspondence. The initial corpus of letters were found at Amenhotep IV's city Akhetaten, in the floor of the Bureau of Correspondence of Pharaoh; others were later found, adding to the body of letters.

== The letter ==
Burna-Buriash letter no. 4 of 6, title: "Ancient loyalties, new request"

(photo of Obverse, EA 9 )

Para I

(Lines 1-6) Say-(qabu (qí-bil-ma)) to NibhurreReya, (Neb-kheper-Ra-ia), the king of Egy[pt-(Mizri), my brother]: "(message)-Thus"-("um-ma"), Thus, the king of Karad[un]iyaš, your brother. For me all goes well. For you, your household, your wives, your sons, your country, your ma[g]nates, your horses, your chariots, may all go very well.

Para II

(7-18) From the time my ancestors and your ancestors made a mutual declaration of friendship, they sen[t] beautiful greeting-gifts to each other, and refused no request for anything beautiful. My brother has now sent me 2–minas of gold-(2-KU3-SIG17) as my greeting-gift. Now, (i)f gold (KUG.GI) is plentiful-(DAGAL), send me as much as your ancestors (sent), but if it is scarce, send me half of what your ancestors (sent). Why have you sent me 2–minas of gold? At the moment my work on a temple is extensive, and I am quite busy with carrying it out. Send me much gold-(KU3-SIG17). And you for your part, whatever you want from my country, write me so that it may be taken to you.

Para III

(19-38) In the time of Kurigalzu, my ancestor, all the Canaanites wrote here to him, saying, "C[om]e to the border of the country so we can revolt and be allied [wi]th you!"

(Approximate end of Obverse side) See here:

(Approximate start of Reverse)
My ancestor sent them this (reply), saying, "Forget about being allied with me. If you become enemies of the king of Egypt, and are allied with anyone else—will I not then come and plunder you? How can there be an alliance with me?" – For the sake of your ancestor, my ancestor did not listen to them. Now, as for my Assyrian vassals-(i.e. Ashur-uballit I, king), I was not the one who sent them to you. Why on their own authority have they come to your country? If you love me, they will conduct no business whatsoever. Send them off to me empty–handed.

(A 4-Line spacing on Reverse)

I send to you as your greeting-gift 3–minas of genuine lapis lazuli, and 5–teams of horses for 5–wooden chariots. -EA 9, lines 1-38 (3 paragraphs) (complete)

== See also ==
- Amarna letters–phrases and quotations
- List of Amarna letters by size
  - Amarna letter EA 5, EA 9, EA 15, EA 19, EA 26, EA 27, EA 35, EA 38
  - EA 153, EA 161, EA 288, EA 364, EA 365, EA 367
