= Amarna letter EA 100 =

14th-century BC Egyptian clay tablet

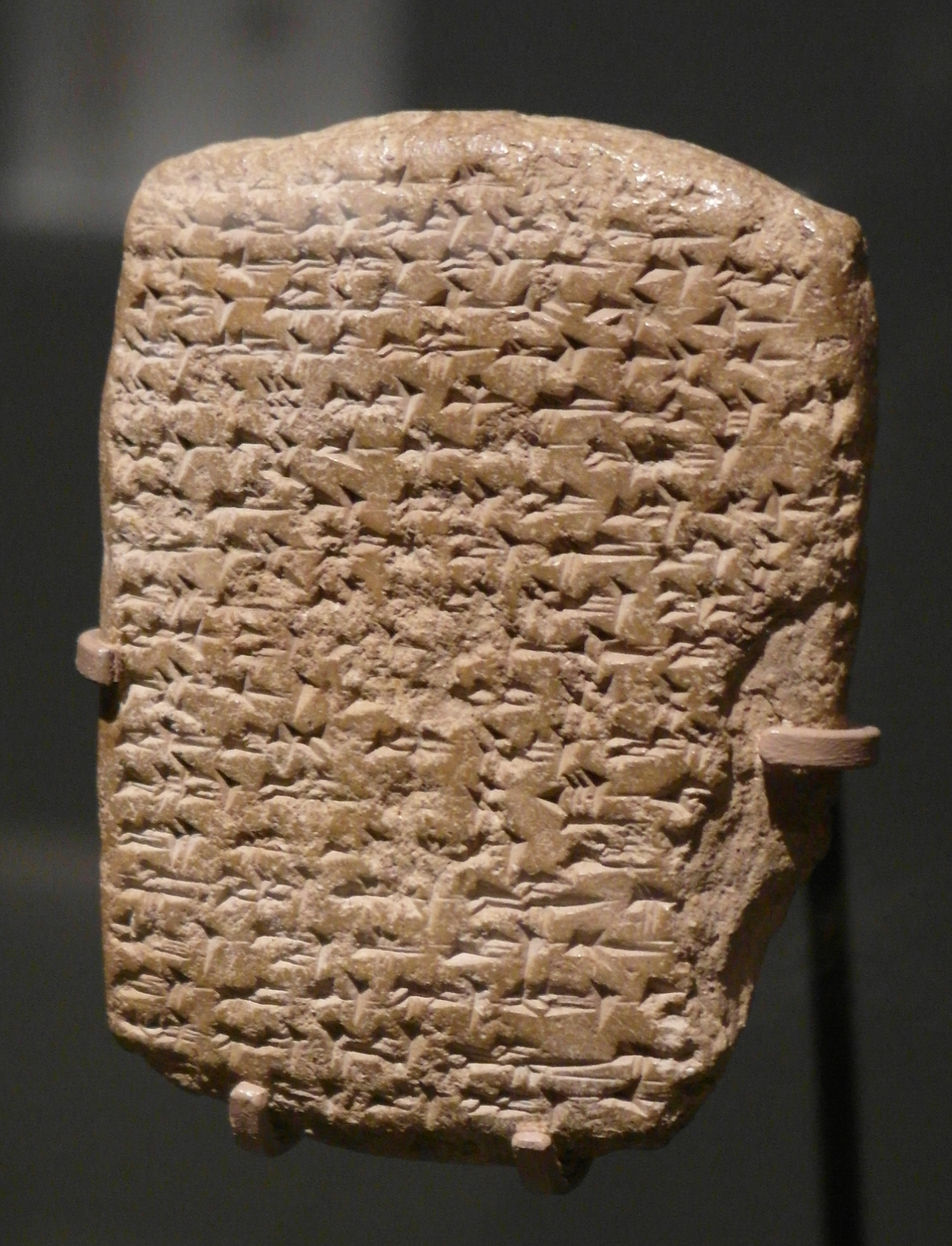
- Back of Amarna letter EA 100
- Material: Clay
- Created: c. 1350 BC
- Present location: British Museum, England, United Kingdom
- Language: Akkadian

Amarna letter EA 100, titled: "The City of Irqata to the King" is a short to moderate-length clay tablet Amarna letter from the city-state of Irqata, (modern Arqa, Lebanon), written during the Middle Babylonian Period to the Pharaoh of Egypt. Only one other city sent a clay tablet Amarna letter to the Pharaoh, namely Tunip, letter EA 59, titled: "From the Citizens of Tunip".

The letter concerns the "watch-guarding" of Irqata, regional warfare (with the Habiru/'Apiru), and the city's continued protection, and loyalty to the Egyptian Pharaoh. The letter implies their loyalty, their constant vigilance, and need for assistance from the Pharaoh, either implied by troop needs, or at least awareness from the Pharaoh, of their needs.

EA 100 is located at the British Museum, no 29825. Tablet letter EA 100 can be viewed here: Front: , Back: .

== The letter ==
=== EA 100: "The City of Irqata to the King" ===
EA 100, letter one of one from the elders of city-state Irqata. (Not a linear, line-by-line translation.)

Obverse:

(Lines 1-10)--This tablet is a tablet from Irqata (Arqa). To the king, our lord: Message from Irqata and its el(d)ers.^{1} We fall at the feet of the king, our lord, 7 times and 7 times. To our lord, the Sun: Message from Irqata. May the heart of the king, (our) lord, know^{2} that we guard Irqata for him.
Paragraph II
(11-18)--When the [ki]ng, our lord, sent D[UMU-Bi-Ha-A, he said to [u]s, "Message of the king: Guard Irqata!"^{3} The sons of the traitor to the king seek our harm;^{4} Irqata see[ks]^{5} loyalty to the king.
Paragraph III
(19-22)--As to [silver] having been given to S[u]baru (Sú-ba-ru,) al[ong with] 30 horses and cha[riots],

Reverse:

Paragraph III-B
(23)--May you know the mind of Irqata!
(24-32)--When a tablet from the king arrived (saying) to ra[id] the land that the 'A[piru] had taken [from] the king, they wa[ged] war with us against the enemy of our lord, the man whom you pla[ced] over us.^{6} Truly we are guarding the l[and].^{7} May the king, our lord, heed the words of his loyal servants.
Paragraph IV
(33-44)--May he grant a gift to his servant(s) so our enemies will see this and eat dirt.^{8} May the breath of the king not depart from us.^{9} We shall keep the city gate barred until the breath of the king reaches us. Severe is the war against us — terribly, terribly.--(complete, only very minor lacunas, lines 1-44)

== The Habiru/Apiru ==

The mention of the Habiru relates to a major conflict of the time, the takeover of city-states or regions by the Habiru. The map shows various cities and regions, and their respective dealings with the Habiru. (There are only 3 letters from Labaya of Shechem.) The next closest mention of the Habiru is from the Jerusalem letters of Abdi-Heba, directly south at Jerusalem, letters EA 286, 287, 288, 289, and EA 290.

=== Spellings for Habiru in the Amarna letters ===
- EA 100, l. 26—KUR,.. ša ìl-qú LÚ.MEŠ GAZ,.. [ ištu ]–.]–( LÚ-MEŠ GAZ )
- EA 271, l. 16—..lú-meš Sa-GaZ-meš .. ( Men (pl), SA.GAZ^{MEŠ(pl)}
- EA 290, l. 24—..Ha-Pí-Ri .. ( Hapiru ( 'Apiru ))
- EA 299, l. 18—..da-an-nu LÚ-SA-GAZ-meš .. ( "Strengthening" - LÚ.SA.GAZ.MEŠ ..( "Strengthening Habiru" )
- EA 366, l. 21—.. {LÚ} SA-GAZ .. ( ^{LÚ}SA-GAZ (Habiru))

== Akkadian text ==
Text: Akkadian language, sumerograms, Egyptianisms, etc.

Akkadian:

Obverse:
Paragraph I (see here: )

(Line 1)—Ṭup-pí an-nu-ú,.. ṭup-pí–.–.–.–.–.–.–(Tablet this,.. tablet (of)- )
(2)— ^{_URU_}-IR-Qa-Ta,.. a-na (lugal=ŠÀR-ru)_LUGAL_-ri–.–.–(-^{City-state}-Irqata-(Arqa),.. to (the)-King—!.. )
(3)— _EN_-nu,.. um-ma,.. ^{_URU_}-IR-Qa-Ta–.–(Lord-Ours,.. "message thus",.. ^{Quote-City-state}-Irqata—!..-- )
(4)—ù _LÚ.MEŠ_ ši-bu(!)-ti-ši,..–.–.–.–.–.–.–.–.–(--and MEN(pl) elders,..—! )
(5)—ana _GÌR.MEŠ_,.. -_LUGAL_-ri _EN_-nu^{Unquote},..–.–(at (the) Feet(pl),.. "King-Lord-Ours",.. )
(6)—7 šu,.. 7 ta-an-ni,.. am-qú-ut!..–.–.–.–.–.–(7 times,.. (and) 7 'times again',.. we bow—!,.. )(?we address you?^{UnQuote})
(7)—ana EN(=Bēlu)-nu,.. An-UTU,.. umma--–.(.. To Lord-Ours,.. ^{God}-"Sun-God",.. "message thus"-(of) -- )
(8)—^{URU}-IR-Qa-Ta!.. "i-de ŠÀ(=lìb)-bi"–.–.–(..^{City-state}-Irqata—!.. ..^{Quote}"Know (in the)-HEART (of the)" -- )
(9)—LUGAL EN,.. i-nu-ma ni-na-ṣa-ru–.–.–( --King-Lord—!.. .."Now (-at-this-time)" (we) 'Watch-Guard' -- )
(10)—^{URU}-IR-Qa-Ta,.. ana ša-šu—!...–.–.–.–.–(^{City-state}-Irqata,.. for Him—!"^{UnQuote} ....(i.e. for the Pharaoh) )

(Line 1)--(Tablet this,.. tablet- )
(2)--(-^{City-state}-Irqata-(Arqa),.. to (the)-^{Quote}King—!.. )
(3)--(-Bēlu-nu^{Unquote},.. "umma",.. ^{City}-Irqata—!.. )
(4)--(ù LÚ.MEŠ-(šību)"the elders"—!.. )
(5)--(ana šêpu(meš),.. "LUGAL(=ŠÀR-ru)-Bēlu-nu",.. )
(6)--(7 šu (ù) 7 ta-an-ni, maqātu!.. )
(7)--(ana Bēlu-nu,.. ^{d}-UTU,.. umma --)
(8)--(^{City}-Irqata!.. .."Idû (in the)-ŠÀ(=lìb)-bi (=libbu)" -- )
(9)--(LUGAL EN!.. ..Inūma(=enūma) naṣāru -- )
(10)--(-^{City}-Irqata,.. ana šâšu!.... )

Paragraph I–Cuneiform score, Akkadian, English

1.Ṭup-pí an-nu-ú,.. ṭup-pí
___țuppu annû, – țuppu
___(Tablet this,.. tablet (of)- )
2.^{_URU_}-IR-Qa-Ta,.. a-na (lugal=ŠÀR-ru)_LUGAL_-ri
___^{_URU_}-IR-Qa-Ta,.. ana (lugal=ŠÀR-ru)_LUGAL_-ri
___(-^{City}-Irqata,.. to King(=ŠÀR-ru)- )
3._EN_-nu,.. um-ma,.. ^{Quote_URU_}-IR-Qa-Ta
___ _EN_-nu,.. – umma,.. ^{_URU_}-IR-Qa-Ta—!
___(_Lord_-Ours,.. – "message thus",.. ^{Quote-City-state}-Irqata—!..-- )
4.ù _LÚ.MEŠ_ ši-bu(!)-ti-ši,..
___u ^{_LÚ.MEŠ_} ši-bu(!)-ti-ši (šību),..
___(and (_LÚ.MEŠ_)-(šību)"the elders"—!.. )
5.ana _GÌR.MEŠ,.. ^{Quote}-LUGAL_-ri _EN_-nu^{Unquote},..
šību
___(at (the) Feet(pl),.. "King-Lord-Ours",.. )
6.
___(and) 7 'times again',.. we bow!,.. )(?we address you?^{UnQuote})
7.
___(.. To Lord-Ours,.. ^{God}-"Sun-God",.. "message thus"-(of) -- )

segue:
Paragraph II
(11)—I-nu-ma yu-wa-ši-ra,.. LUGAL,..–.–.–.–("Now-(at-this-time)",.. sent,.. (the) King- )
(12)—EN-nu,.. 1.diš-DUMU-Bi-Ha-A,.. Ù–.–.–(..-Lord-Ours,.. 1.-DUMU(son(=compatriot))-Bi-Ha-A,.. And,.. )
(13)—yi-iq-bi,.. ana ia-ši-nu–.–.–.–.–.–(..He said,.. to us,.. )
(14)—^{Quote}Umma LUGAL,.. Ú-ṣa-ru-mi–.–(^{Quote}"Message thus" (the) King,.. Guard!.. )
(15)—^{URU}-IR-Qa-Ta!..^{Unquote} .. DUMU.MEŠ,.. )--(^{City-state}-Irqata!^{Unquote}.. "Sons"(Compatriots),.. )
(16)—LÚ-ša-ri LUGAL-ri–.–.–.–.–.–(of the traitor,.. (of the)King,.. )
(17)—tu-ba-ú-na-nu!..–.–.–.–.–.–("seek harm"(attack/'to rise up')!.. )
(18)—^{URU}-IR-Qa-Ta,.. tu-a-[-ú!.. ]–.–(^{City}-Irqata,.. "seeks loyalty"!..(="to be good") )

(11)--(Inūma aṣû/uššuru,.. LUGAL(=ŠÀR-ru)- )
(12)--(Bēlu-nu,.. 1. DUMU-Bi-Ha-A,.. Ù,.. )
(13)--(..qabû,.. ana iāši,.. )
(14)--(^{Quote}"Umma" (the) LUGAL: Naṣāru!.. )
(15)--(^{City}-Irqata!..^{Unquote} .. DUMU.MEŠ (of),.. )
(16)--(LÚ-ša-ri,.. (of the)-Šarru,.. )
(17)--(tebû-("us")!.. )
(18)--(^{City}-Irqata,.. tâbu!... )

Paragraph II–Cuneiform score, Akkadian, English

Cuneiform score (per CDLI, Chicago Digital Library Initiative), and Akkadian, and English.

segue:

Paragraph-(lines 11-18)

11.I-nu-ma yu-wa-ši-ra^{#},.. LUGAL^{#}
___(Inūma aṣû/uššuru,.. LUGAL(=ŠÀR-ru)- )
___("Now-(at-this-time)",.. sent-(by),.. (the) King- )
12._en_-nu,.. ^{1=m=diš}1.diš "1=[ _DUMU_ ]-Bi-Ha-A,.. [ ù ]
___(Bēlu-nu,.. "1. DUMU-Bi-Ha-A",.. u,.. )
___(..-Lord-Ours,.. 1.-DUMU(son(=Compatriot))-Bi-Ha-A,.. And,.. )
Subsection 2 of 5
12.8---------[ Ù ]
___-------------u
___---------(.. And,.. )
13.yi-iq-bi,.. a-na ia-[ ši ]-nu^{#}
___(..qabû,.. ana iāši,.. )
___(..(He) said,.. to us,.. )

Subsection 3 of 5
14.^{Quote}Umma LUGAL,.. ú^{#}-ṣa-ru-mi^{#}
___(^{Quote}"Umma" (the) LUGAL: Naṣāru!.. )
___(^{Quote}"Message thus" (the) King,.. Guard!.. )
15.^{URU}-IR-Qa-Ta dumu-meš^{#}–!
___(^{City}-Irqata!..^{Unquote} .. DUMU.MEŠ (of),.. )
___(^{City-state}-Irqata!^{Unquote}.. "Sons"(Compatriots),.. )
Subsection 4 of 5
15.6--------( DUMU.MEŠ^{#} )
___-----------( DUMU.MEŠ
___------——---(.."Sons"(Compatriots),.. )
16.LÚ-ša-ri LUGAL-ri
___(LÚ-ša-ri,.. (of the)-Šarru,.. )
___(of the traitor,.. (of the)King,.. )
17.tu-ba-ú-na-nu–
___(tebû-("us")^{?2nd-Unquote?}!–!.. )
___("seek harm"(attack/'to rise up')^{?2nd-Unquote?}!–!.. )
Subsection 5 of 5
18.^{URU}-IR-Qa-Ta,.. tu-a-[-ú^{#}––.. ]
___^{City}-Irqata,.. tâbu–!... )
___(^{City}-Irqata,.. "seeks loyalty"–!..(="to be good") )–!

Paragraph-(lines 19-32)

Paragraph III
(19)—Ki-ta a-na,.. LUGAL-ri,..–.–.–.–(As to(Whether),.. King,.. )
(20)—i-nu-ma,.. na-ad-nu [ x a-na,.. –.–.("Now-(at-this-time)",.. "having given"("to throw/cast"),.. (x="silver"),.. to,.. )
(21)—^{KUR (land Sumerogram)|KUR}-Sú-Ba-Ri,.. qa-du,..–.–.–.–.–.–(^{Land}-Subaru,.. "handed over",.. )
(22)—(3x(u) ANŠE.KUR.RA.MEŠ [ (ù) ^{giš}-GIGIR.MEŠ ]–.–(30 Horses [ (and) chariots ],.. )

(19)--(Kī ana,.. LUGAL-ri(ŠÀR-ri),.. )
(20)--(inūma,.. nadû [ x ana ],.. )
(21)--(^{KUR}-Su-Ba-Ri,.. qātu.. )
(22)--(30 ANŠE.KUR.RA.MEŠ [ (ù) (GIŠ).GIGIR.MEŠ ],.. )

(end Obverse)

Reverse: (see here: )

Paragraph III (cont.)
(23)—Ti-de,.. ŠÀ(=lìb)-bi ^{URU}-IR-Qa-Ta!..–.–.–(..Know,.. (the) mind(=heart) (of)-^{City}-Irqata!.. )
segue:
(24)—I-nu-ma,.. ka-ši-id –.–.–.–.–.–(.."Now-(when)",.. "arrived"("emplaced"),.. )
(25)—ṭup-pí,.. LUGAL ^{Quote}A-na ša-[ -ha-at ]--(..tablet (of the) King,.. ^{Quote}"To Raid"("to strip") -- )
(26)—KUR,.. ša ìl-qú LÚ.MEŠ GAZ,.. [ ištu ]–.–(LAND,.. which "taken" (by) LÚ.MEŠ-("Habiru")(gaz),.. [ from ])
(27)—LUGAL-ri,..^{Unquote} i-te_{9}-ep-pi-[ -šu ]–.–( (the) King,..^{Unquote} "waging war"("attack"-ing) -- )
(28)—nu-KÚR,.. it-ti-nu,.. ana KÚR–.–.–(..(in) War(fare),.. "with-us"(against-us),.. by (the)ENEMY,.. )
(29)—EN-nu,.. LÚ ti-ìš-ta-[ -pár-šu ]–.–( (of) Lord-Ours,.. (The)-MAN,.. "emplaced",.. )
(30)—UGU-nu,.. adi ni-na-ṣa-ru,.. ki–.–("OVER-us",.. "until" "guarding",.. "as if" )
segue:
(31)—yi-ìš-mé,.. LUGAL-ru EN-nu,.. –.–(Hear("Listen"),.. King-Lord-Ours,.. )
(32)—a-wa-te,.. ARAD.MEŠ ki-ti-šu,.. –.–((the) 'words'("explanations") (of) SERVANT-S(pl)-yours!.. )

segue:
(23)--(..Idû,.. (the) ŠÀ(=lìb)(=heart) (of)-^{City}-Irqata!.. )
segue:
(24)--(Inūma,.. kašādu -- )
(25)--(ṭuppu LUGAL(ŠÀRru),.. ^{Quote}Ana Šahāṭu -- )
(26)--(KUR,.. ša leqû (by) LÚ.MEŠ "Habiru"(gaz),.. ištu -- )
(27)--( ŠÀR-ri(Šarru),..^{Unquote} tabû -- )
(28)--(nukurtu,..itti-nu,.. ana nukurtu -- )
(29)--(Bēlu-nu,.. "emplaced" -- )
(30)--(--UGU-nu(eli/muhhi-nu),.. adi naṣāru,.. kî,.. )
segue:
(31)--(Hear("Listen"),.. King-Lord-Ours,.. )
(32)--((the) amatu,.. ARAD.MEŠ-kâti!.. )

Paragraph III–Cuneiform score, Akkadian, English

Cuneiform score (per CDLI, Chicago Digital Library Initiative), and Akkadian, and English.

Paragraph-(lines 33-43)

Paragraph IV
(33)—Ù,.. ia-di-na,.. NÍG-BA,.. –.–( ..And,.. (may) he ("grant"))"know",.. GIFTS,.. )
(34)—ana ARAD-šu,.. ù,.. ti-da-ga-lu,.. –(to SERVANTS-his,.. and,.. (see)"to look",.. )
(35)—LÚ.MEŠ, a-ia-bu-nu ù,.. –.–.–.–(MEN(pl), "enemies"?,.. and,.. )
(36)—ti-ka-lu ep-ra!... ša-ri–.–.–.–.–(..Eat Dirt!.. (May the)-Breath,.. )
(37)—LUGAL-ri,.. ú-ul ti-na-mu-uš--(..(of the) King,.. Not "depart"(leave),.. )
(38)—iš-tu mu-hi-nu,..–.–.–.–.–.–(from "upon us"!.. )
(39)—a-bu-la nu-ú-du-lu,.. a-di,..–((The)-"City-Gate" "is barred",.. until,.. )
(40)—ka-ša-di,.. ša-ri–.–.–.–.–(..("emplaced")"Returned,.. (the)-Breath,.. )
(41)—LUGAL,.. ana ia-ši-nu –.–(..(of the) King,.. for Us!.. )
segue:
(42)—kal-ga,.. nu-KÚR,.. UGU-nu!.. –(..("All")Severe,.. Warfare,.. UPON-us!.. )
(43)—[ ma-]-GAL!.. ma-GAL!.. –.–("Strongly",.. "Strongly",.. (Terribly!.. Terribly!...) )

(33)--( ..Ù,.. idû?,.. NÍG-BA,.. )
(34)--(ana ARAD-šu,.. ǜ,.. dagālu,.. )
(35)--(LÚ.MEŠ(pl), a-ia-bu-nu,.. ù,.. )
(36)--(akālu eperu!... Šāru,.. )
(37)--(LUGAL-ri(ŠÀR-ri),.. ul tamû,.. )
(38)--(ištu muhhu!... )
(39)--(Abullu xxx,.. adi )
(40)--(kašāda,.. šāru,.. )
(41)--(LUGAL,.. ana iāši-nu,.. )
segue:
(42)--(kalu,.. nukurtu,.. UGU-nu,.. )
(43)--(magal!.. magal!... )

Paragraph IV–Cuneiform score, Akkadian, English

Cuneiform score (per CDLI, Chicago Digital Library Initiative), and Akkadian, and English.

Paragraph-(lines 33-43)

38.iš-tu mu-hi-nu
39.a-bu-la nu-ú-du-lu,.. a-di
40.ka-ša-di,.. ša-ri
___(kašādu,.. šāru,.. )
___("emplaced")"Returned,.. (the)-Breath,.. )
41. ..LUGAL^{#},.. a-na ia-ši-nu
__(LUGAL,.. ana iāši-nu,.. )
__(..(of the) King,.. for Us!.. )
segue:
42.kal^{#}-ga,.. nu-kúr,.. UGU-nu
___(kalu,.. nukurtu,.. UGU-nu,.. ) – !
___(..("All")Severe,.. Warfare,.. UPON-us.. ) – !
43.[ ma-]-gal ma-gal
___magal – !, magal – !
___("Strongly",.. "Strongly",.. (Terribly – !.. Terribly – !...) )

== See also ==
- Arqa (city-state Irqata)
- Amarna letter EA 59 (city-state Tunip)
- Amarna letters–phrases and quotations
