= Lu (cuneiform) =

Cuneiform sign

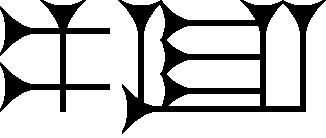
Digitized-style signs: Pa-Lu.

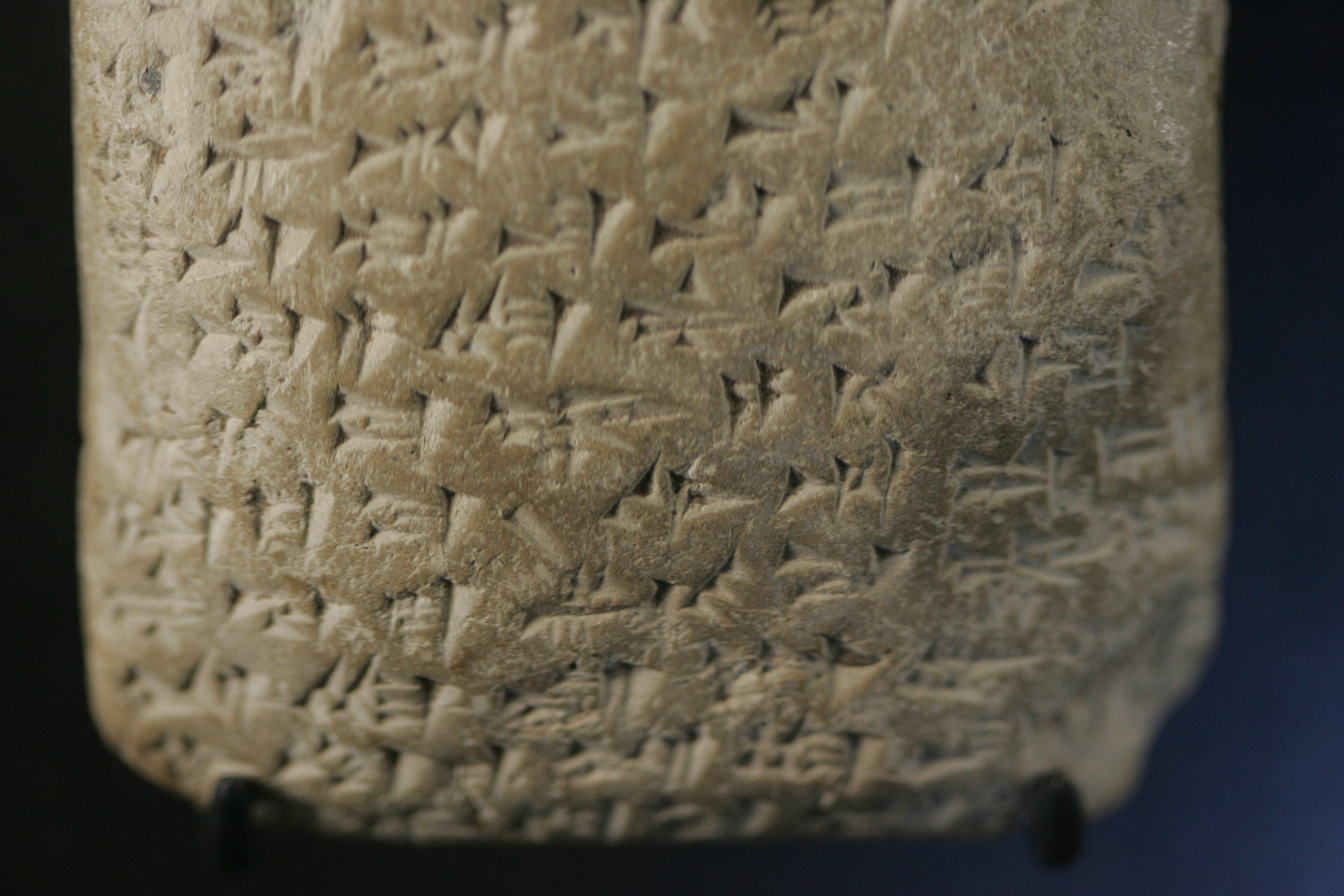
Amarna letter EA 365-(Reverse, bottom-half), by Biridiya of Magiddo, "Furnishing Corvee Workers"; lines 19-27 (visible), with line 25: ub-ub-lu, with LU.MEŠ,.MEŠ, following. (MEŠ is "a vertical"-attached to 3 ascending "wedges".)

The cuneiform lu sign is a common, multi-use sign, a syllabic for lu, and an alphabetic sign used for l, or u; it has many other sub-uses, as seen in the Epic of Gilgamesh over hundreds of years, and the 1350 BC Amarna letters. Its other uses show other syllabic and alphabetic forms that it can be used for: other vowels, or consonants; (in Akkadian d can replace t, and b and p are also interchangeable). There are also four sumerogrammic sub-forms for "lu" in the Epic of Gilgamesh, LU, and UDU, and DAB and DIB; LU transposes to Akkadian language, "lullû", for English language, (primitive) man; DAB transposes to ṣabātu, English for to seize, capture.

The usage numbers for lu (sign no. 537) in the Epic of Gilgamesh are as follows: dab-(2) times, dap-(4), dib-(1), lu-(293), tep-(1), tàb-(1), tib-(4), DAB-(4), DIB-(1), LU-(9), UDU-(1).

The lu cuneiform sign is within a small group of signs that are composed of 1- or 2-vertical strokes (at right or left), the other signs being no. 535 Ib (cuneiform), no. 536 ku (cuneiform) (only 1-vertical, left and right), no. 575 ur (cuneiform), and gáb (cuneiform).

Besides ša usage in word components of verbs, nouns, etc., it has a major usage between words. In Akkadian, for English language "who", it is an interrogative pronoun; in the Akkadian language as ša, (as "that", "what"; ("that (of)", "which (of)"), in English it used for who, what, which, etc..

== Ša, and Ka, the stroke differences ==
The difference in the construction of the signs ka and ša are as follows: "ka" when scribed in the Amarna letters often shows the distinctiveness of the right section of the sign, versus the left section. For ša, the right section is constructed with two wedge strokes (one scribed above the other), between the two verticals, at right. For ka, the right side mostly, in the Amarna letters has two verticals, with two horizontals that cross both of them; (the right side is like a two-step ladder shape—(for Hittite ka:—)). A good example of ša, is shown for EA 365, Reverse (top half), where the 2-wedge strokes of ša between the 2-right verticals is clear. (Note, the ša of EA 365 appears to have 3-horizontals at left (differing lengths), then the 2-verticals with the 2-wedge strokes, at right.)

== Ša Usage numbers ==
=== Epic of Gilgamesh ===
The usage numbers for lu (sign no. 537) in the Epic of Gilgamesh are as follows: ša-(66) times. There are no other sub-uses or sumerogramic uses for ša in the Epic of Gilgamesh.

=== Amarna letters ===
Cuneiform ša is common in the Amarna letters, found easily between words (as the pronoun), and especially in word constructs. Since it is similar in appearance to cuneiform ka, the large difference is that ka can easily be found as a suffix to words, for example in the Canaanite sub-corpus of letters as "Servant-Yours",, (ARAD-ka).
