= Ur-Baba =

Ruler of Lagash in present-day Iraq (r. 21st or 20th century BCE)

Ur-Baba 𒌨𒀭𒁀𒌑
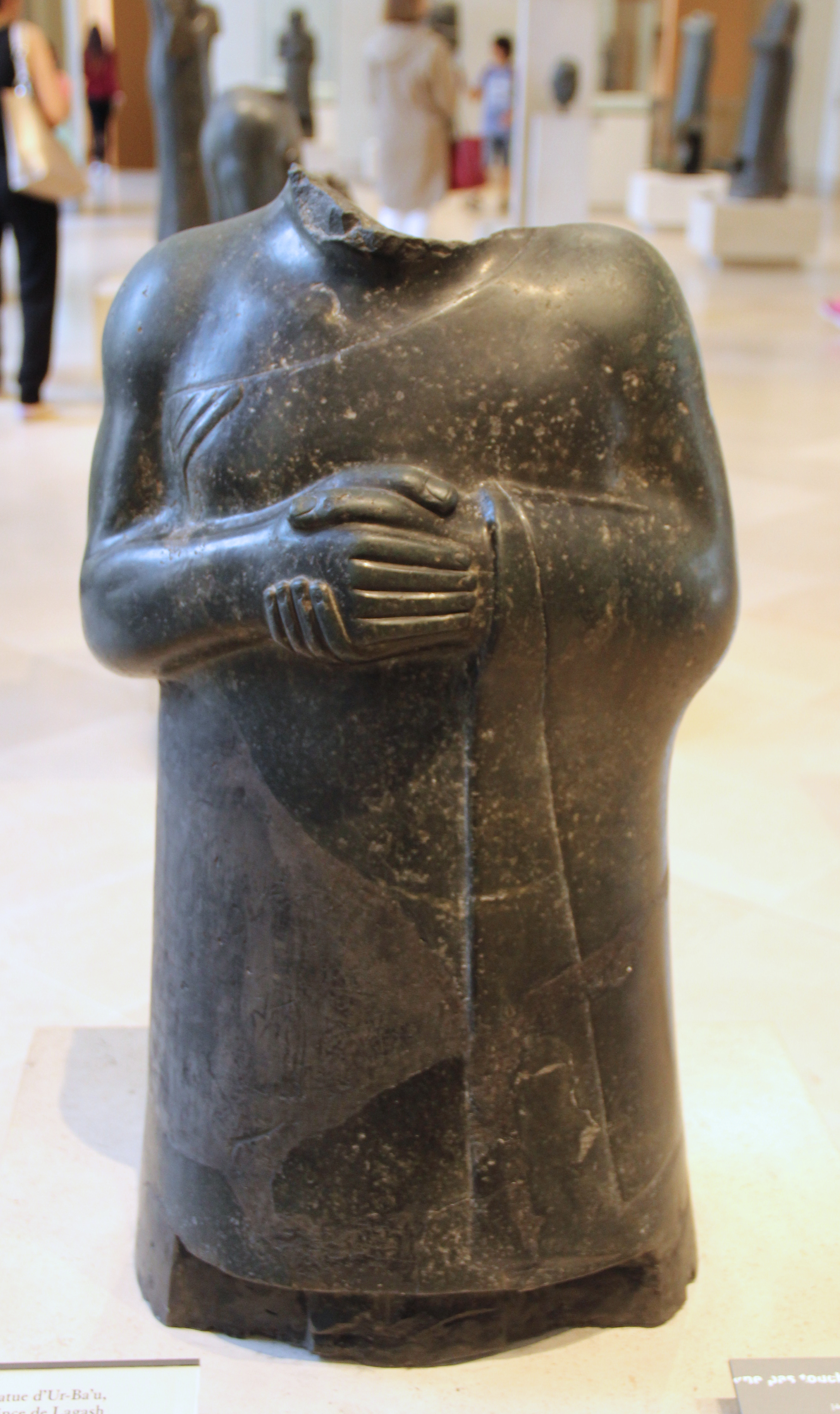
- Diorite Statue of Ur-Ba'u (Ur-Baba), Prince of Lagash. Louvre Museum, AO 9.

King of Lagash
- Reign: c. 2164 – c. 2144 BC
- Predecessor: Possibly Kaku
- Successor: Gudea
- Died: c. 2144 BC
- Issue: Ninalla
- Dynasty: 2nd Dynasty of Lagash

Location of Lagash

Ur-Baba or Ur-Bau (Sumerian: 𒌨𒀭𒁀𒌑 ur-^{D}ba.ba_{6} or ur-^{D}ba.U_{2}, servant of the goddess Bau; died c. 2144 BC) was ensi of Lagash from 2093 BC – 2080 BC (short chronology) or 2157 BC – 2144 BC (middle chronology), roughly contemporaneous with the last king of Akkad, Shu-turul. In one of his inscriptions, he refers to himself as a child of the god Ninagal (Sumerian: 𒀭𒎏𒀉𒃲).

According to inscriptions of Ur-Baba, during his reign, Lagash enjoyed prosperity and independence from the Akkadians. His daughter Ninalla married Gudea, who succeeded him as ensi.

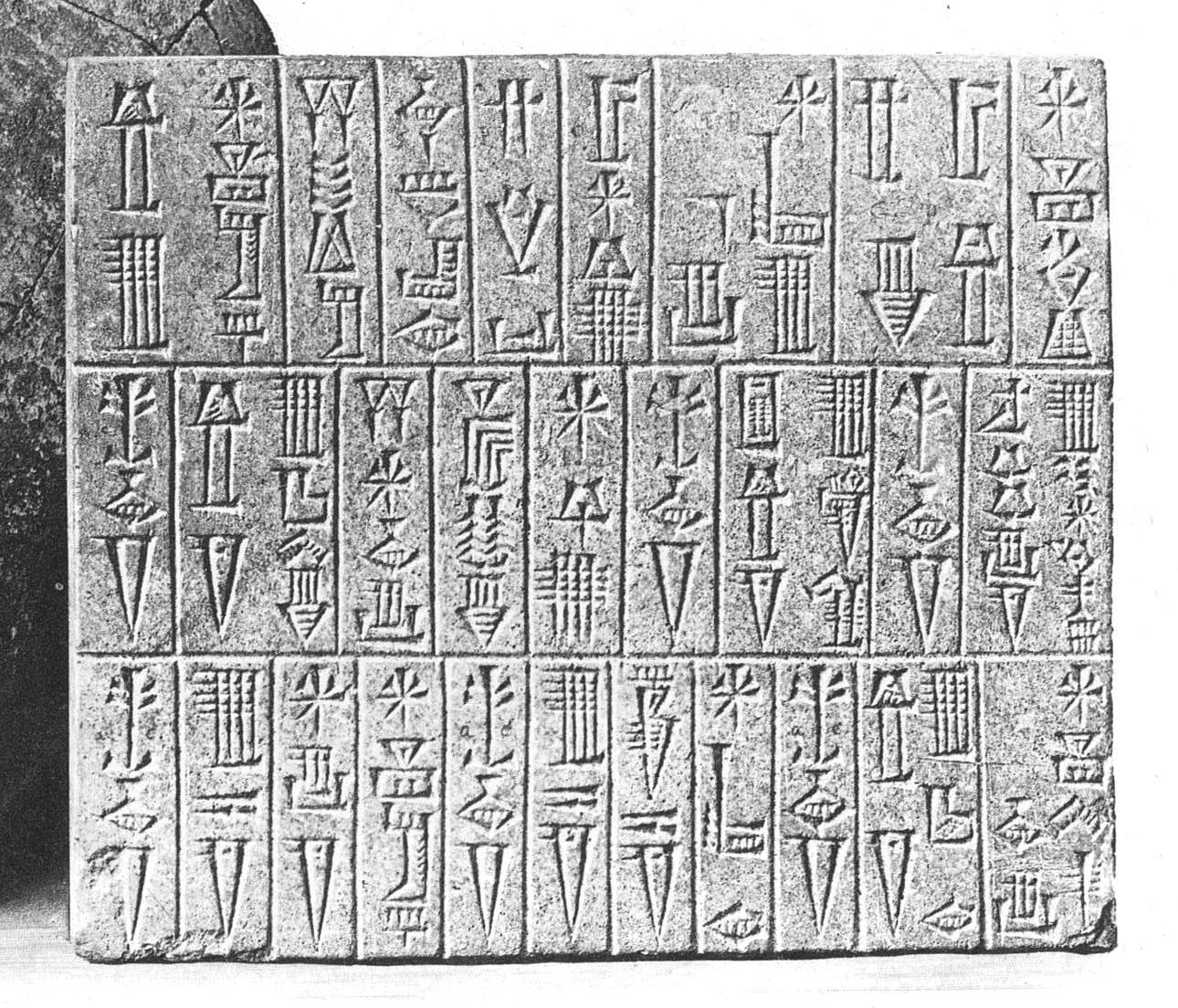
Tablet of Ur-Baba, Girsu

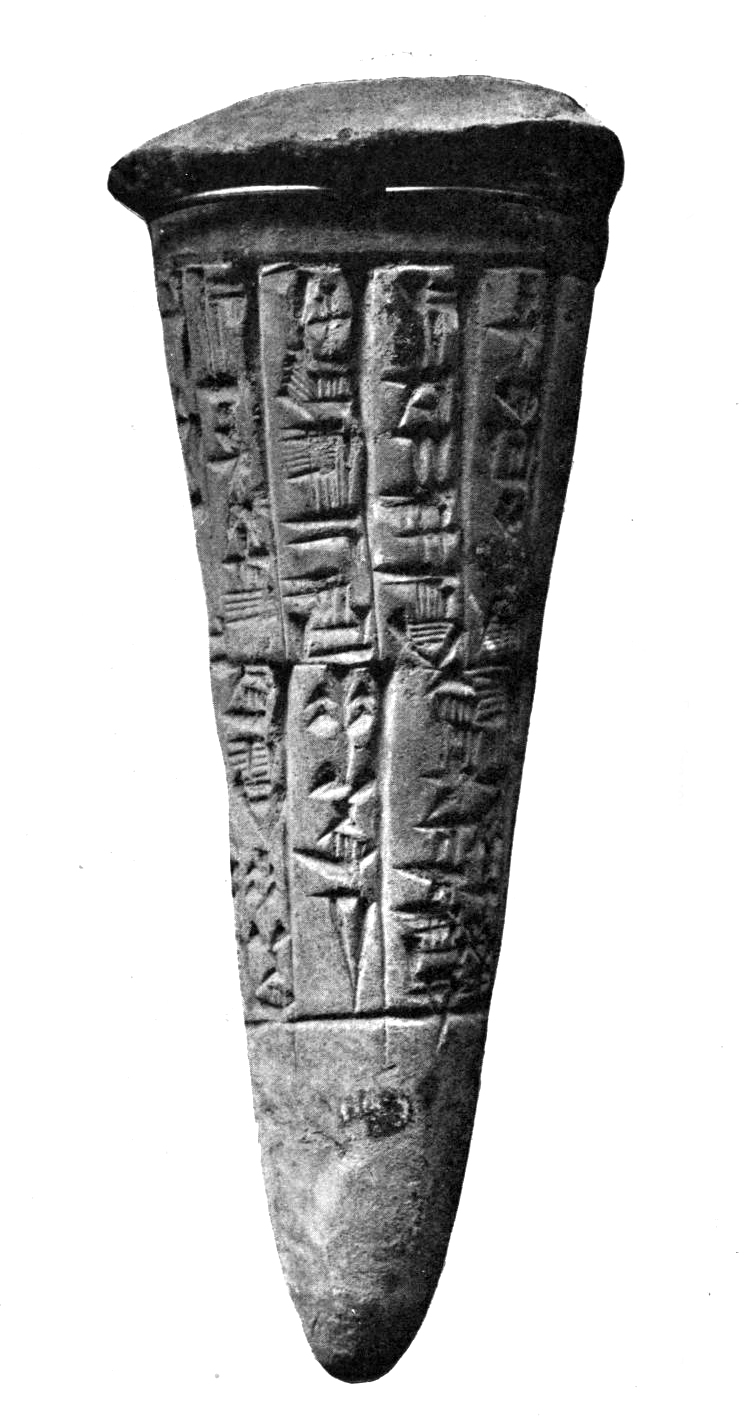
Cone with name and title of Ur-Baba, king of Lagash

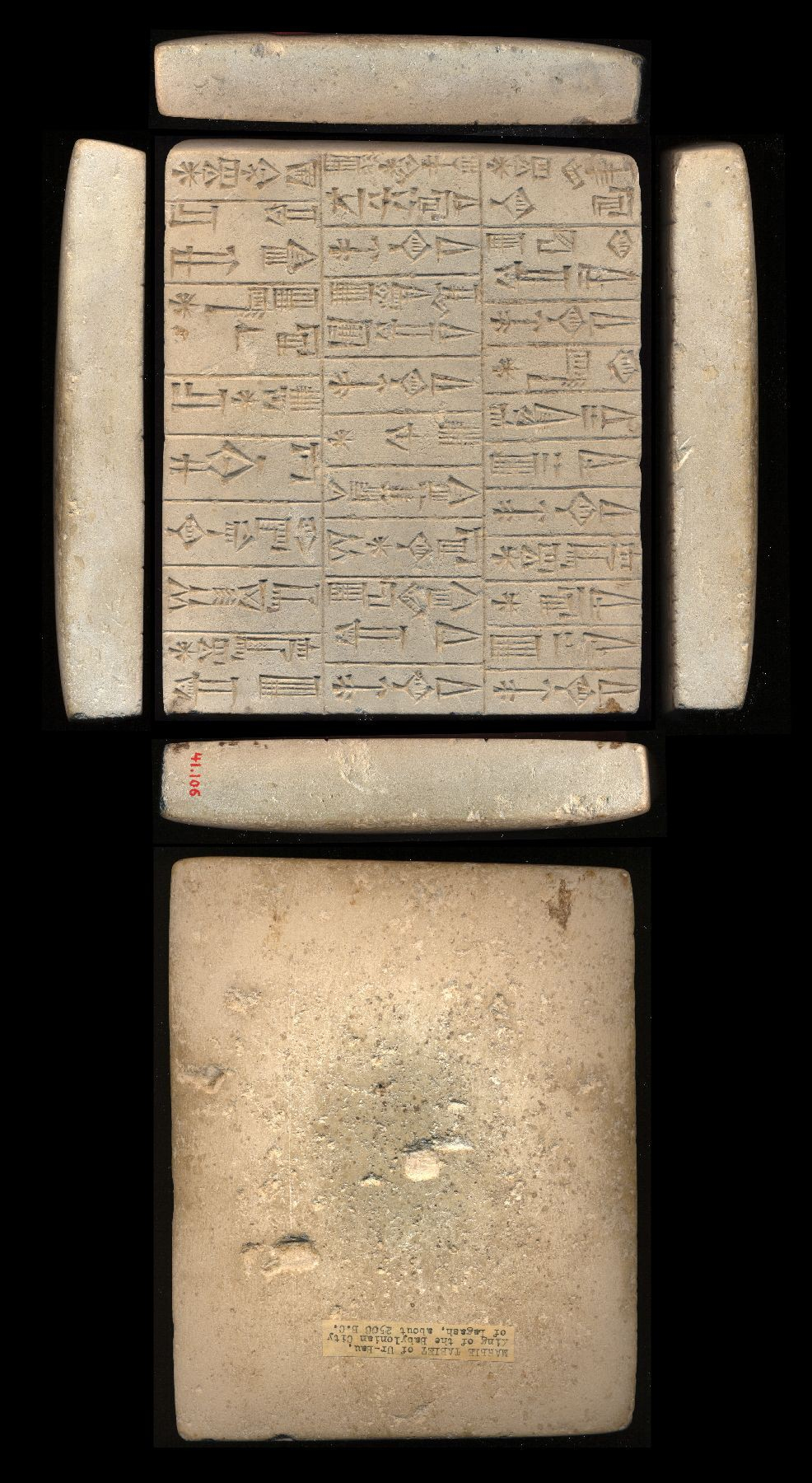
Ur-Bau foundation tablet. Walters Art Museum.

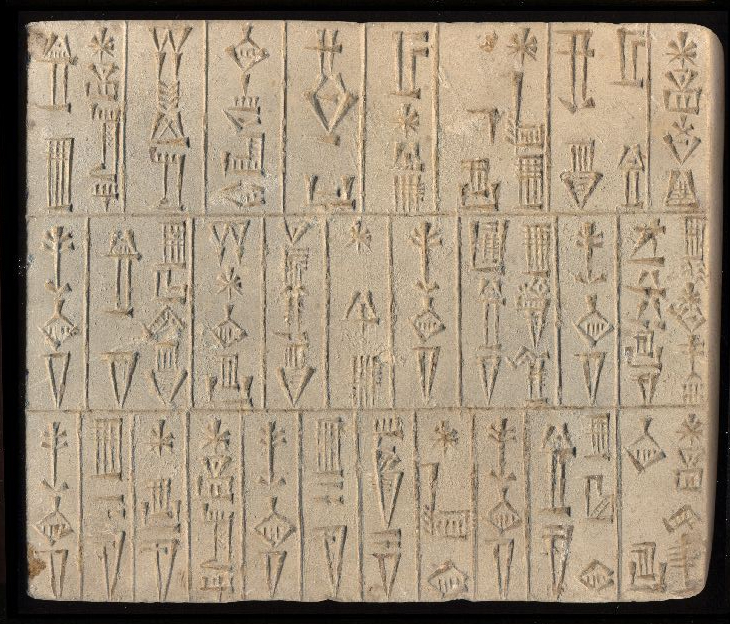
Ur-Bau foundation tablet (front detail). Walters Art Museum.

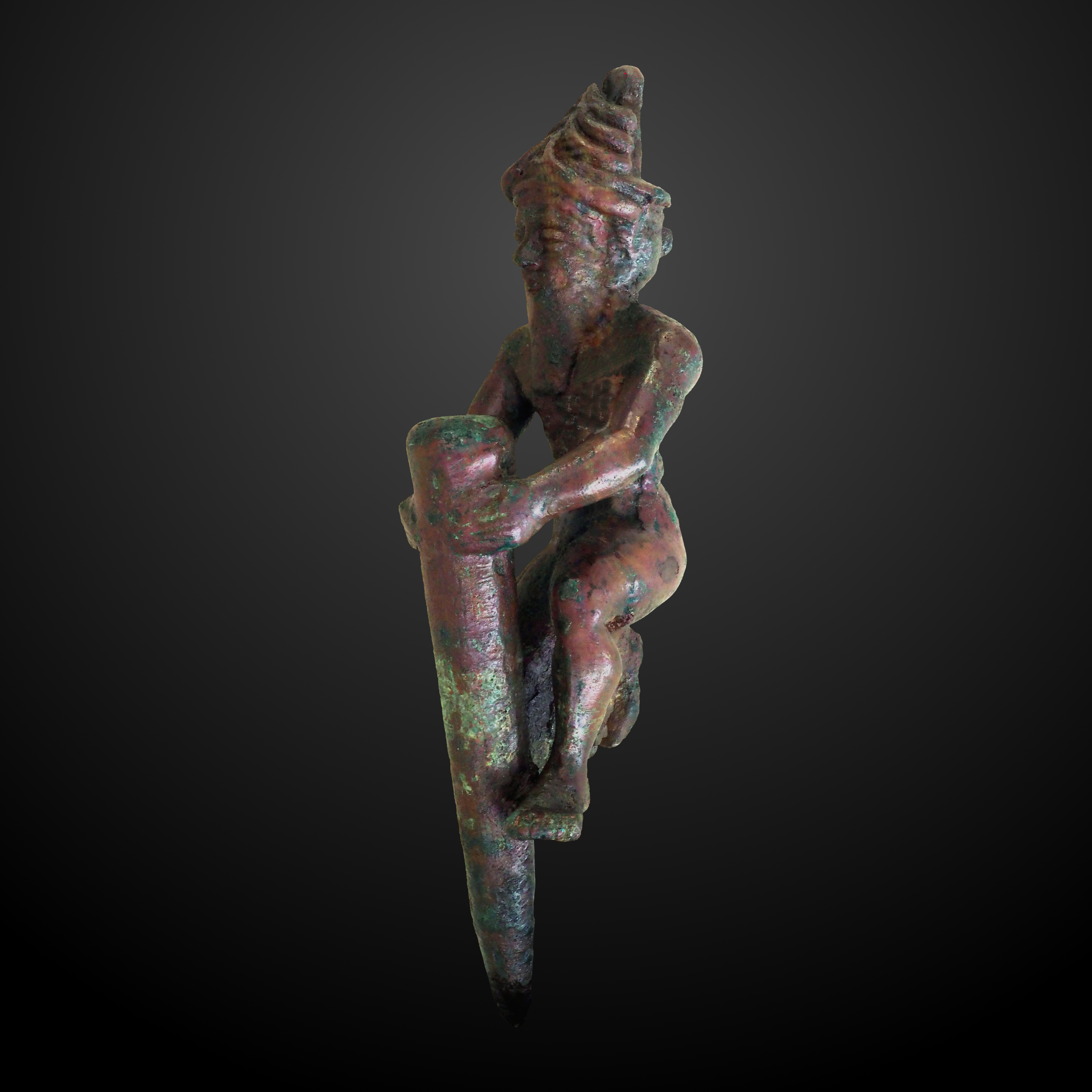
Foundation figurine of Ur-Baba

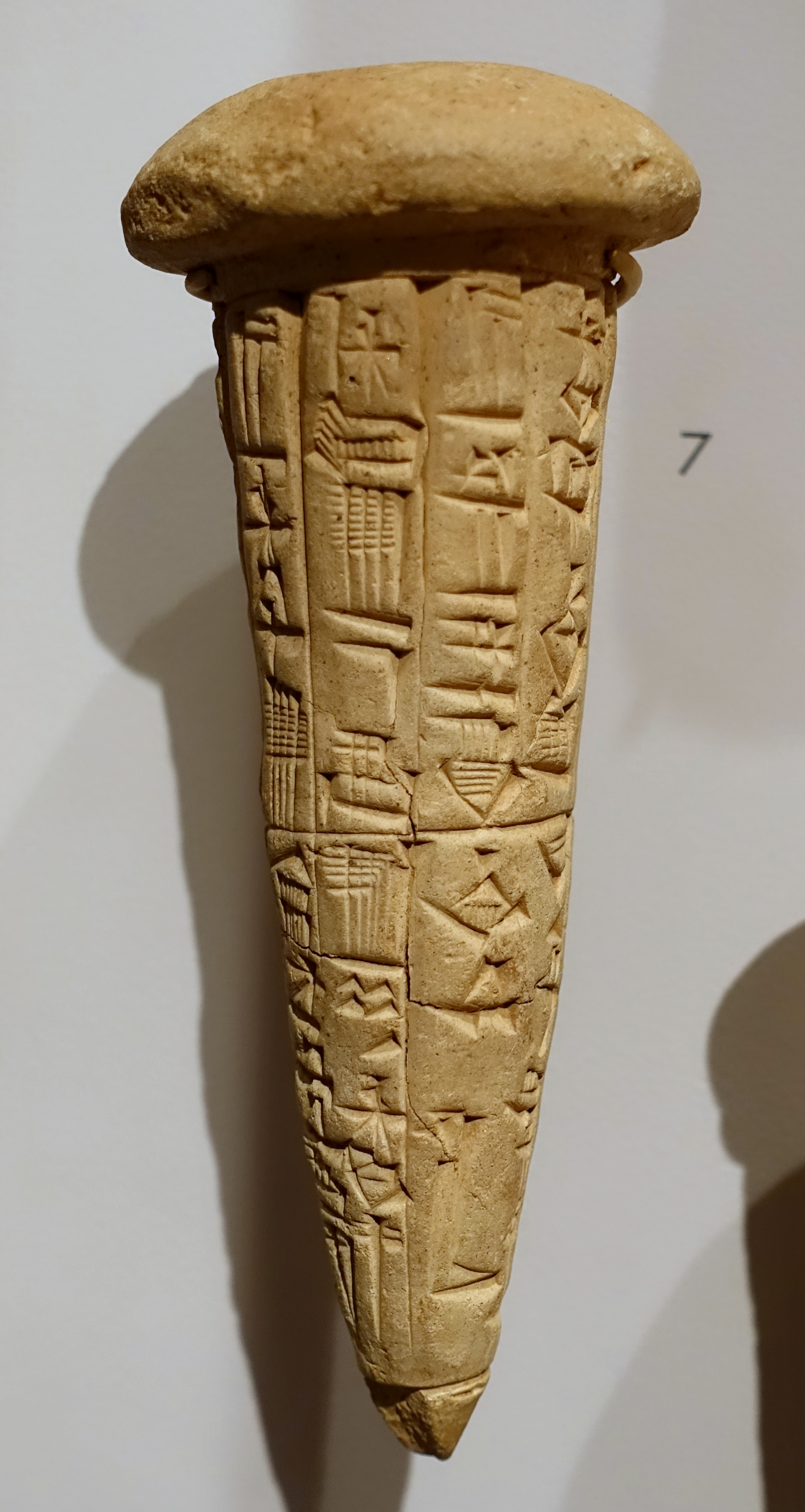
Cuneiform dedication cone of Ur-Bau

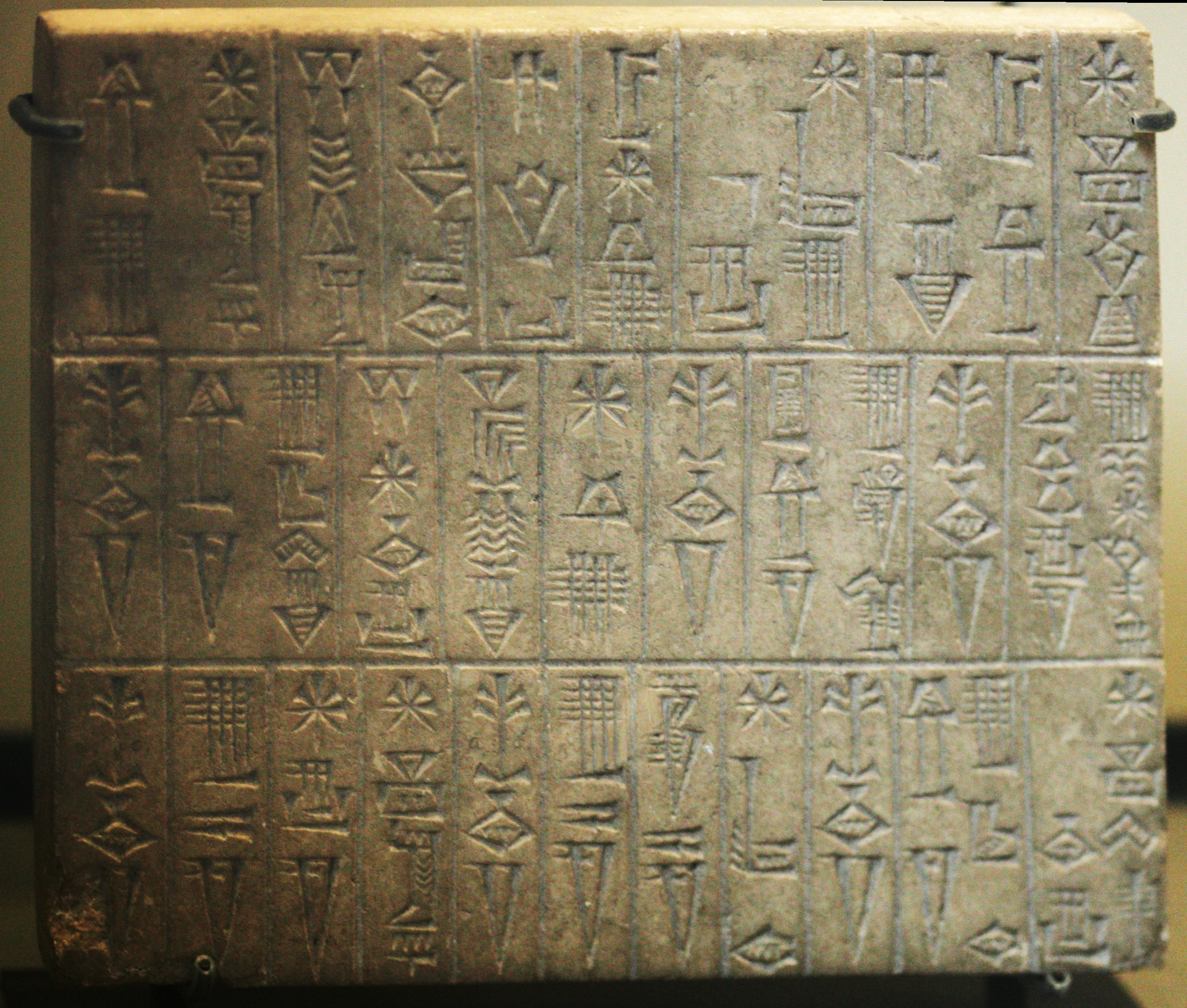
Ur-Baba inscription plaque enumerating the temples erected by him; Louvre collection (AO 261).

Regnal titles
Preceded by Possibly Kaku	King of Lagash c. 2164 – c. 2144 BC	Succeeded by Gudea
