= God of carpentry =

God of carpentry may refer to:

- Lu Ban, a carpenter deity and patron of builders and contractors in Chinese folk religion
- Ninildu, a carpenter deity in Ancient Mesopotamian religion, mainly worshiped in the city of Zabalam

== See also ==
- Saint Joseph, Saint Matthias, and Saint Peter the Apostle, patron saints of carpentry in Christianity
