= Amarna letter EA 59 =

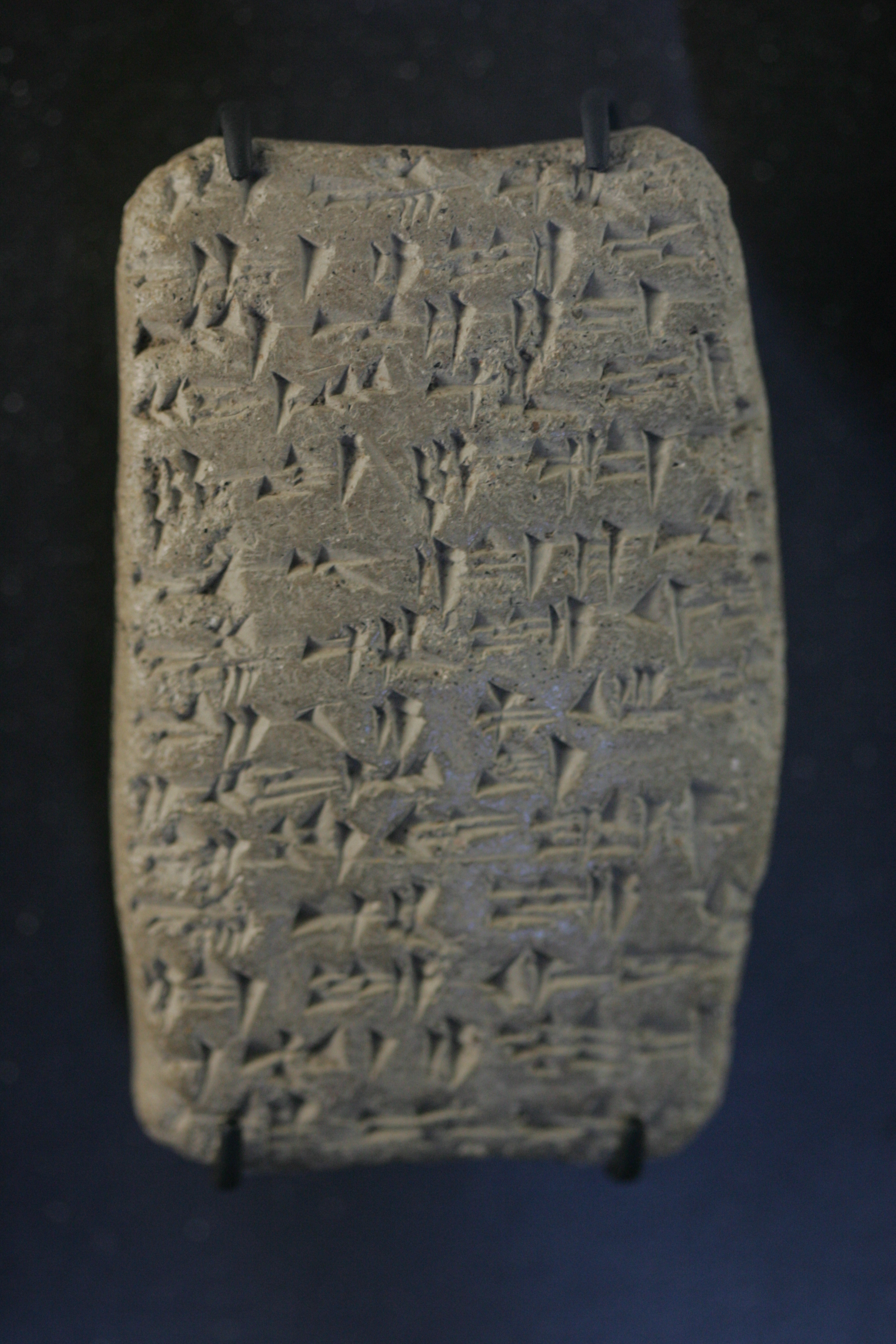
EA 364, (Obverse), with some similarities to EA 100 (EA 100 is slightly wider, and a little taller). EA 100, has 22 lines per side; EA 364, 14 lines. (high-resolution expandable photo)

Amarna letter EA 59, titled: "From the Citizens of Tunip", is a short- to moderate-length clay tablet Amarna letter from the city-state of Tunip, written to the Pharaoh of Egypt. Only one other city sent a clay tablet Amarna letter to the Pharaoh, namely Irqata (modern Arqa), letter EA 100, titled: "The City of Irqata to the King".

The EA 59 letter concerns the "watch-guarding" of Tunip, regional warfare (with the Habiru), and the city's continued protection, and loyalty to the Egyptian Pharaoh.

EA 59 is located at the British Museum, no BM 29824. A line drawing of tablet letter EA 59 can be viewed here: Obverse & Reverse:

== The letter ==
=== EA 59: "From the Citizens of Tunip" ===
EA 59, letter one of one from the elders of city-state Tunip. (Not a linear, line-by-line translation.)

Obverse, See here

(Lines 1-4)—To the king of Egypt (Misri of the letters), our lord: Message of the Citizens of Tunip, your servant.^{1} For you may all go well. And we fall at the feet of my lord.

(5-8)—My lord, thus says Tunip, your servant: Tunip——who ruled it in the past?^{2} Did not Manahpirya: am-ma-ti-wu-uš (your ancestor) rule it?^{3}

(9-12)—The gods and the ...: na-ah-ri-il-la-an (?)^{4} of the king of Egypt, our lord, dwell in Tunip, and he should inquire of his ancients: am-ma-ti (ancient) when we did not belong to our lord, the king of Egypt.

(13-17)—And now, for 20 years,^{5} we have gone on writing to the king, our lord, but our messengers have stayed on with the king, our lord. And now, our lord, we ask for the son of Aki-Teššup from the king, our lord.^{6} May our lord give him.

(18-20)—My lord, if the king of Egypt has given the son of Aki-Teššup, why does the king, our lord, call him back from the journey?

(21-24)—And now Aziru is going to hear that in Hittite territory a hostile fate has overtaken your servant, a ruler (and) your gardener.^{7}

(25-28)—Should his (the king's) troops and his chariots..

Reverse, See here

(~27-28)—..be delayed, Aziru will do to us just as he did to Nii.

(29-33)—If we ourselves are negligent and the king of Egypt does nothing about these things that Aziru is doing, then he will surely direct his hand against our lord.

(34-38)—When Aziru entered Ṣumur, he did to them as he pleased, in the house of the king, our lord. But our lord did nothing about the{s}e things.

(39-42)—And now Tunip, your city, weeps, and its tears flow, and there is no grasping of our hand.

(43-46)—We have gone on writing to the king, our lord, the king of Egypt, for 20 years, and not a single word of our lord has reached us.^{8}—(complete, only very minor lacunas, lines 1-46)

== See also ==
- Tunip (city-state Tunip)
- Amarna letter EA 100 (citizens of Irqata)
- Amarna letters–phrases and quotations
