= Nunura =

Mesopotamian god

- Divine potter

Nunura (also romanized as Nunurra) was a Mesopotamian god regarded as a divine potter. He was also associated with apotriopaic magic and exorcisms, and in multiple incantations he is invoked against demons. Late god lists equate him with Ea, which reflects a broader trend of treating artisan deities as aspects of that god.

== Name and character ==
Nunura's name was written in cuneiform as ^{d}Nun-ur_{4}-ra or ^{d}Nin-ur_{4}-ra, though the latter spelling is considered unusual. The name could also be represented by the logogram ^{d}BÁḪAR, "potter". However, this combination of signs could also be used to write at least five other theonyms: Aruru, Lil, Enenuru, Nunšar and Šaršar, the last three of which are secondary names of Enki/Ea. Additionally, in the lexical list Diri Nippur the meaning of two logograms, ^{d}BÁḪAR and ^{d}SIMUG ("smith"), is seemingly swapped around, with the former explained as the blacksmith god Ninagal and the latter as Nunura. Markham J. Geller refers to Nunurra as a female deity. Hower, other authors consistently describe him as male.

Nunura functioned as a divine potter. He was addressed as the potter of Anu (Sumerian: báḫar gal an-na-ke_{4}, Akkadian: pa-ḫa-ru rabû šá ^{d}a-nim), though he could also be associated with Ea. In late god lists they could be equated with each other, one example being An = Anu ša amēli, where Nunura is explained as "Ea of the potter".. It is presumed this is an example of a broader late tendence of equating artisan deities with him, in Nunura's case possibly made easier by the resemblance of his name to the magical formula enenuru, which was associated with Ea.

Nunura also played a role in apotropaic magic and exorcisms. An incantation related to ablution rites refers to him as the "lord of purification" (lugal nam-išib-ke_{4}).

== Attestations ==
Nunura is attested in a number of incantations. A text of this genre from the third millennium BCE lists him alongside Enki and Asalluhi, who are common in magical formulas, and Ninshubur, who is otherwise virtually absent from the corpus of such texts from this period. If the restoration is correct, he is invoked to get rid of demons from a house, similarly as in later sources such as Udug Hul. Said incantation series describes Nunura heating up various ingredients associated with magic and medicine in an oven (tablet 9, line 47'). He is invoked to remove a demon from a house in a "pot fired in a pure kiln from a pure place". It is presumed that it was a real container used in the ritual, as the passage appears to also invoke other deities, for example Ningirima, Nisaba and Lisin, in relation to tools or materials which are known to have played a role in Mesopotamian exorcisms. An Old Babylonian incantation describes Nunura preparing a saḫar, a porous vessel used as a container for water in exorcisms, from clay earlier cleansed by the purification goddess Kusu. A text found in Nimrud contains the phrase "Nunurra, fired from a great kiln", likely the beginning of another unpreserved formula.

The compendium CBS 6060, an esoteric text assigning deities to substances or objects, states that porringers correspond to Nunura and then in turn explains this name as Ea.
