= Kusibanda =

Mesopotamian god

- Divine goldsmith and silversmith
- Major cult center: Nippur, Uruk

Genealogy
- Spouse: Ninimma

Kusibanda (Kusigbanda), also known under the disputed older reading of the name, Guškinbanda, was a Mesopotamian god regarded as the tutelary deity of goldsmiths and silversmiths. He was commonly grouped with other deities of similar character, such as Ninagal. He was also regarded as the husband of Ninimma, and was worshiped in her temple in Nippur. He is attested in texts describing the preparation of statues, as well as in a variety of documents from Uruk from the Seleucid period.

== Name and character ==
Kusibanda's name was written in cuneiform as ^{d}KUG.GI.BÀN.DA. According to Julia Krul, the other proposed reading, Guškinbanda, is no longer used today. Wilfred G. Lambert has nonetheless argued that since guškin is a common reading of the first two signs, the modern consensus might be incorrect. Lambert's position is also supported by Frank Simons.

Kusibanda was regarded as a divine goldsmith and silversmith. He served as the tutelary deity of both of these professions. In the Epic of Erra, he is described as the "fashioner of god and man, whose hands are consecrated". It is presumed this passage reflects his role in rituals focused on the fashioning of statues.

== Associations with other deities ==
Kusibanda was one of the members of a group of Mesopotamian artisan deities, the so-called "gods of the craftsmen" (ilī mārē ummâni), which also included Ninagal, Ninkurra, Ninildu and other similar figures. He appears particularly often alongside the first of these deities, who was a divine blacksmith. In the god list An = Anum he is listed among the members of the court of Enlil, even though Ninagal and Ninkurra are listed with Ea. There is nonetheless evidence that he could be associated with the latter god, and in some cases he was outright equated with him. True to his character, he was specifically referred to as "Ea of the goldsmith". An incantation recited during temple renovations, When Anu had created the heavens (enuma ^{d}anu ibnû šamê) mentions Kusibanda alongside Ninagal, Ninzadim and Ninkurra among deities created by Ea with clay from the Apsu.

According to An = Anum (tablet I, line 316) Kusibanda was the husband of Ninimma, though a tradition according to which this goddess was the spouse of Ninurta also existed. No earlier direct references to a spousal relation between them are known, though they do appear next to each other in a single older list. In a Neo-Assyrian incantation he is addressed as Ninimma's "beloved spouse".

== Worship ==
Earliest attestations of Kusibanda come from the Ur III period. The Nippur Compendium lists him among the deities worshiped in the temple of Ninimma located in this city. He also often appears in texts describing the preparation of statues. The mîs-pî (literally "mouth washing") ritual, consecration of a new divine statue, mentions Kusibanda among the deities for whom offering tables should be set up during the ceremony. At one point, the formula "I did not make (the statue), (I swear) I did not make (it), [...], Kusibanda, who is Ea the god of the goldsmith made it" had to be recited as well. A prayer serving as the conclusion of the ceremony also reaffirms that the statue was made by Ninkurra, Ninagal, Kusibanda, Ninildu and Ninzadim.

A text describing the origin of the so-called "sun god tablet of Nabu-apla-iddina" lists Kusibanda among the deities whose skills were utilized by Nabu-nadin-šumi to complete this work of art. In an inscription of Esarhaddon describing the return of exiled gods to Babylon, Kusibanda is mentioned as one of the craftsman deities residing in Ekarzagina, the local temple of Ea, alongside Kusu, Ningirima, Ninkurra, Ninagal, Ninildu and Ninzadim. Nabonidus in an inscription commemorating the renovating of the temple Ebabbar and the preparation of a new crown for the god it was dedicated to, Shamash, states that after receiving instructions from him and Adad through extispicy, he had said accessory created through the craft of the deities Kusibanda and Ninzadim.

Kusibanda appears in texts from Uruk from the Seleucid period pertaining to the akītu festival as one of the deities possibly worshiped in the Bīt Rēš complex. He received offerings on the morning of its seventh day alongside Papsukkal. He is also invoked in a ritual connected to temple renovation. However, he is not attested in earlier, Neo-Babylonian sources from this city. His introduction to the local pantheon might have reflected his importance in the eyes of local āšipu and kalû clergy, which was related to his role as a divine craftsman.
