= Ninagal =

Mesopotamian god

- Divine smith
- Major cult center: Girsu

Genealogy
- Spouse: Ninimin

Ninagal (Sumerian: 𒀭𒎏𒀉𒃲) or Ninagala was a Mesopotamian god regarded as a divine smith. He was commonly associated with other deities connected to craftsmanship. Texts from the reign of Ur-Baba of Lagash indicate that he was the personal deity of this king, who built a temple dedicated to him, most likely in Girsu. He is well attested in texts dealing with the preparation of statues of deities, as well as other cultic paraphernalia.

== Name and character ==
Ninagal was regarded a divine smith. He could be called the "chief smith" (simug gal) of An. His name was written in cuneiform as ^{d}Nin-á-gal, and can be translated from Sumerian as "lord of the big arm". It could also be represented logographically using the sign SIMUG, "smith", and writings such as ^{d}SIMUG or ^{d}NIN.SIMUG are also attested. However, in a single incantation a separate god named Ninsimug appears alongside Ninagal, with the two seemingly described as responsible for different types of metalworking. In the lexical list Diri Nippur the meaning of ^{d}SIMUG is apparently switched around with ^{d}BAḪAR, with the former explained as the potter god Nunura and the latter as Ninagal.

In the Epic of Erra Ninagal is described as the "wielder of the upper and lower millstone", possibly either an anvil and a hammer or elements of bellows. The following verses address him as a god "who grinds up hard copper like hide and who forges tools".

While Luděk Vacín refers to Ninagal as a goddess, the consensus view presented in Reallexikon der Assyriologie und Vorderasiatischen Archäologie is that he was a male deity.

== Associations with other deities ==
An incantation recited during temple renovations, When Anu had created the heavens (enuma ^{d}anu ibnû šamê) mentions Ninagal among deities created by Ea with clay from the Apsu.

Ninagal was regarded as a member of a category of deities referred to as "gods of the craftsmen" (ilī mārē ummâni), which also included the likes of Ninkurra, Ninildu or Kusibanda. According to Antoine Cavigneaux and Manfred Krebernik, he was particularly commonly associated with the last of the aforementioned deities, who was a divine goldsmith. In late sources, all of the craftsmanship deities could be identified as aspects of Ea.

According to the god list An = Anum (tablet II, line 348), Ninagal's wife was the goddess Ninimin, "lady seven" of "lady of the seven".

== Worship ==
Multiple texts from the reign of Ur-Baba of Lagash indicate that Ninagal was his personal deity. In one of his inscriptions, he describes himself as the son of this god. He also built a temple dedicated to him, according to Andrew R. George possibly in Girsu. This assumption about its location is also supported by Joan Goodnick Westenholz. However, neither Early Dynastic texts from Lagash nor royal inscriptions and administrative texts from the reign of Ur-Baba's successor Gudea mention Ninagal, and he only reappears in sources from Girsu during the reign of Shulgi of Ur.

A prebend connected to the cult of Ninagal is mentioned in two judicial texts from the Ur III period documenting a case involving Enmaḫgalana, an en priestess of Nanna from Ur and daughter of Amar-Sin. This is the only known reference to any connection between Ninagal and the city of Ur. He is also attested in a single theophoric name from the same period, Ninagal-isag.

An incantation from the Old Babylonian period dealing with the consecration of cultic objects mentions Ninagal alongside Aruru, Ea and Asalluhi. An Assyrian texts of the same genre from the first millennium BCE, Wood of the Sea, Planted in a Pure Place, invokes Ninagal and the carpenter god Ninildu to secure their help with the manufacture of a royal throne. An inscription of Sennacherib commemorating the constriction of an akītu house credits him with helping the king with the preparation of its bronze gate. Many of the other known references to the worship of Ninagal come from texts describing the preparation of statues. An instruction from the Mîs-pî series prescribes the preparation of an offering table for him alongside those meant for other deities involved in the described rituals, such as Kusibanda, Ninildu or Ningirima. Another section of the same collection of texts states that after the completion of a statue representing a deity, the craftsman was supposed to recite the formula "I did not make him [the statue], Ninagal [who is] Ea [god] of the smith made him". A text from the reign of Esarhaddon describing the transport of new statues of deities to Babylon mentions him in an enumeration of divine craftsmen and other figures involved in related rites. A fragmentary text enumerates Ninagal, Gibil and Ara as the three deities responsible for the creation of the "Great Copper", a semi-divine agent of purification presumed to be a type of ritual bell. Ninagal's task is to work the metal used to that end.
