= Arazu =

Babylonian God of construction or crafts

Arazu is a Babylonian god of construction and or crafts. Arazu was created by Ea, along with the gods Ninsimug and Ninildu. The three of them were tasked with creating templesSpecifically, Arazu is associated with the completion of building projects and is assumed to be worshiped upon finishing the construction of temples.

It has been interpreted that Arazu is a priest.
