= Ninildu =

Mesopotamian god

- God of carpentry
- Major cult center: Zabalam, Duluma

Ninildu (Sumerian: 𒀭𒊩𒌆𒅆𒉄𒁍, ^{d}Nin-IGI.NAĜAR.BU; also read Ninduluma) was a Mesopotamian god associated with carpentry. He was mainly worshiped in the city of Zabalam and in its proximity. He appears in a number of literary texts, such as the Epic of Erra.

== Name and character ==
The oldest writing of the name is ^{d}Nin-NAĜAR.BU, attested in the god lists from Abu Salabikh and Fara and in the Zame Hymns from the Early Dynastic period, though later on ^{d}Nin-IGI.NAĜAR.BU was employed. A logographic writing, ^{d}NAĜAR, is attested in the god list An = Anum. While the name is commonly rendered as Ninildu in Assyriological literature, the alternate reading Ninduluma has been proposed based on an unpublished incantation from Meturan, which reportedly uses a phonetic spelling. Jeremiah Peterson renders the name as Ninildum due to the presence of an apparent auslaut in a number of sources. It is agreed the deity was male.

Ninildu was associated with carpentry. One source (tablet K 3248) directly calls him ilu ša nāgarri, "the god of the carpenters." He could be called the "chief carpenter," or the "great carpenter of Anu."

An incantation states Ninildu was one of the deities created by Ea with clay from the Apsu, and that he was tasked with the construction of temples alongside Ninsimug and Arazu. Lexical lists also attest the existence of a tradition in which he was equated with Enki (Ea), though it is agreed that it represented a secondary development. A Mîs-pî ritual refers to him as "Ea of the carpenters."

== Attestations ==
The worship of Ninildu in Zabalam is well attested in sources from the third millennium BCE, such as administrative texts from Umma. He also had a cult center in the direct proximity of the former of these two cities. Douglas Frayne states it was named Dulum, in accordance with the reading of the name of the god he uses. It might correspond to modern (Tell) Salbuḫ. In the third millennium BCE, Ninildu is also attested as a theophoric element in names of two individuals from Adab and in a list of offerings from the Old Akkadian period which might have originated in the same city.

A text from the reign of the Middle Babylonian king Nabu-apla-iddina describing the preparation of a new statue of Shamash mentions Ninildu among the deities aiding Ea in the process, alongside Kusigbanda, Ninkurra and Ninzadim. In a first millennium BCE bilingual incantation from Assur, Ninildu is invoked alongside Ninagal during the production of a new royal throne. A Neo-Assyrian inscription of Esarhaddon lists Ninildu among the deities connected to the rites of Ekazaginna, the temple of Ea in Babylon.

Literary texts describing Ninildu's functions include the Curse of Agade and the Epic of Erra. In the former, he is implored to hinder the growth of trees. According to the latter, he was equipped with a "glittering hatchet". In a late composition, known only from a copy found in Kuyunjik, Ninildu and Sirsir are responsible for constructing the boat of Enki.
