= Sa (cuneiform) =

Cuneiform sign

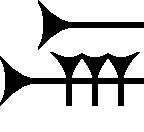
Cuneiform for sa, and Sa; digitized form.

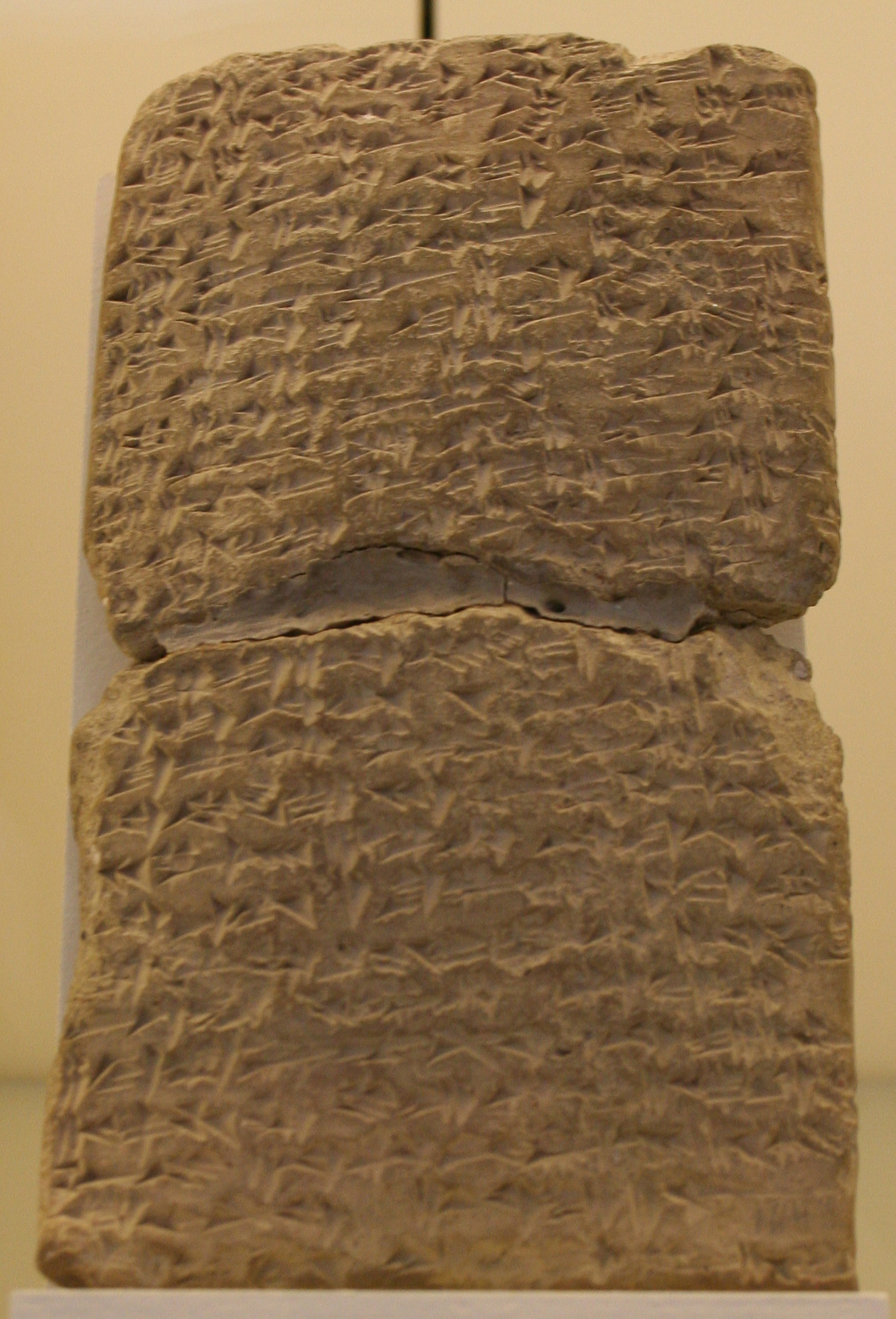
Amarna letter EA 288 which uses cuneiform sa.

The cuneiform sa sign is a less common-use sign of the Epic of Gilgamesh, the 1350 BC Amarna letters, and other cuneiform texts. It also has a sumerogrammic usage for SA in the Epic of Gilgamesh. The structure of the cuneiform sign is similar to, Ir (cuneiform),.

The "sa" sign has the syllabic usage for sa, and a Sumerogram usage for SA.

SA in the Epic of Gilgamesh is a logogram for Akkadian "Šer'ānu", translated as: "muscle, sinew".

== Epic of Gilgamesh usage ==
The sa sign usage in the Epic of Gilgamesh is as follows: sa-(89 times); and SA-(2).
