= Ir (cuneiform) =

Cuneiform sign

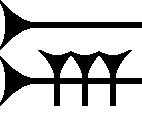
Cuneiform ir, or er sign

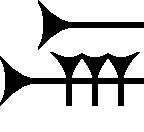
Cuneiform sa sign

The cuneiform ir (more common usage), or er sign is a sign used in the Epic of Gilgamesh, and the Amarna letters. It is in a small group that have smaller, 3-verticals, as well as 2- and 1-vertical strokes, sitting on a lower horizontal cuneiform stroke.

The sign is similar to the sa (cuneiform) sign, but sa's upper horizontal stroke is shorter than the lower anchored horizontal stroke. In the Amarna letters, it can also be confused with specific usages of ú-(the alphabetic u (by usage), Ú-1st prime–Ù-2nd prime is a complex, two-part large cuneiform sign, ="and", "but", or other conjunction meanings), as in Amarna letter EA 362, (Biridiya to Pharaoh).

== Amarna letters and Epic of Gilgamesh usage ==
The twelve tablet (I-XII) Epic of Gilgamesh uses the er, and ir signs, 22 and 72 times. In the Epic, there are no other uses for the sign.

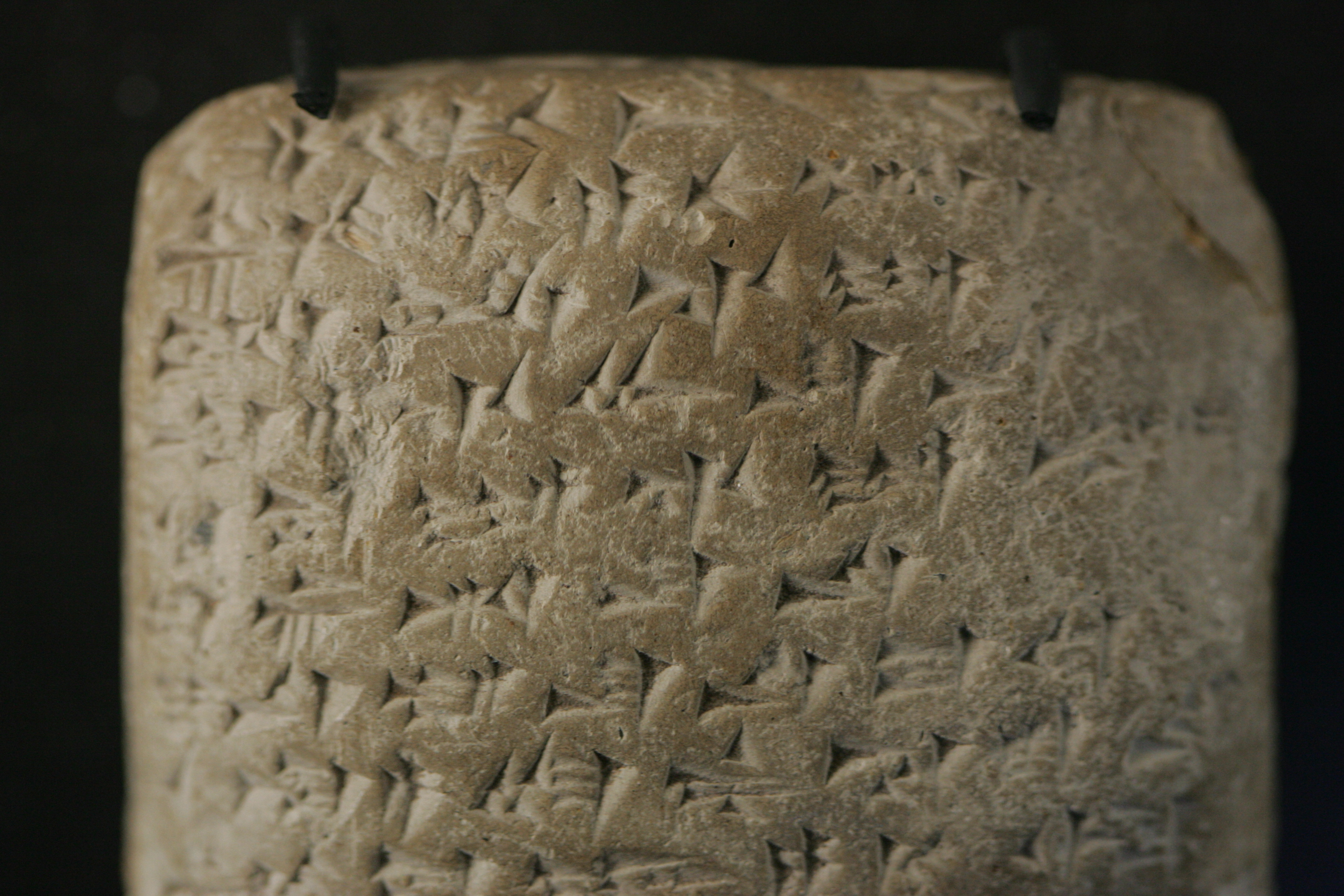
Amarna letter 365 (reverse, top half), Biridiya to Pharaoh, (subject corvee labor, and townsites: Shunama, Yapu, and Nuribta). The "alphabetic" er sign is used in the 6th line (Line 20), second character from left. (text reads left-to-right, with a common signature of the right side of some characters ending in vertical single, or multiple strokes). (high resolution, expandible photo)

For the mid 14th century BC Amarna letters, letter EA 365 authored by Biridiya, it is used for "er". For example, on the reverse of EA 365, subject of corvee labor, "harvesting"-(line 20), lines 15 and following translate as follows: The verb "cultivating" (harvesting) is from "erēšu", which is from "harāšu", Ugaritic ḥrț.

15. "But see! (But Look! (a major segue)) 16. The city rulers 17. who are with me 18. are not doing 19. as I. They are not 20. cultivating ("harvesting") 21. in (determinative URU, city-state)—Shunama 22 and ...."

... (They are not) 20. te-er-ri-šu-na, 22. and ...."
