= Ib (cuneiform) =

Cuneiform sign

Cuneiform gáb, common in Amarna letters (built like ib character, but 2-verticals at right).

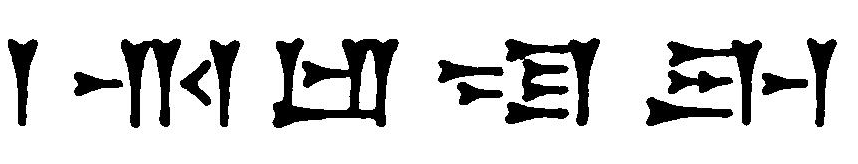
Cuneiform sign ib, 3rd character from left.

The cuneiform sign ib, (or ip) is a common-use sign in the Epic of Gilgamesh, the Amarna letters, and other cuneiform texts. Its common usage is syllabic for ib (or ip), or alphabetic for i or b/p; the "i" is also exchanged for "e" when spelling specific words in the Akkadian language. Cuneiform ib also can be found as sumerogram URTA, (a capital letter (majuscule)), and for example it is used in the Epic of Gilgamesh for the god's name: Ninurta, spelled ^{D}NIN.URTA.

== Epic of Gilgamesh usage ==
Cuneiform ib has other sub-uses in the Epic of Gilgamesh. The following can be found: eb--(4) times, ep--(9), ib--(114), ip--(45), and URTA--(4) times.

== Similar cuneiform forms ==
The cuneiform ib cuneiform character (no. 535) is built in a 'rectangular box form', sitting upon a long horizontal stroke. It contains the 2-verticals at right and 1-vertical at left. Three other signs are similarly built, cuneiform ur is the mirror image of "ib"/"ip", but with the two verticals at left. The "lu (cuneiform)" sign is identical to "ib", but instead of 1-short vertical in the center, lu contains 3-short verticals in the center. Another sign is similar to lu, but has only 1-vertical, left and right, ku (cuneiform), and the Amarna letters is usually so compact, that hardly any of the individual strokes can be easily identified.

Another sign is similar in this group to cuneiform ur, but the center is replaced by 2 strokes, one angled down, and the other a wedge (at extreme right vertical), and is the gáb sign. In the Amarna letters it is often used for English "all", or "all (of us)", Akkadian language, gabbu. (Amarna letters EA 153, EA 287, EA 288, and EA 267)
