= Ur (cuneiform) =

Cuneiform sign

Cuneiform sign ur

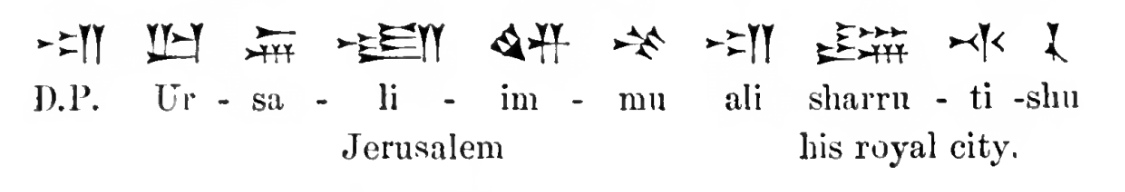
Use of the character in writing the name Jerusalem.

The cuneiform sign ur (𒌨) is a common-use sign in the Epic of Gilgamesh, the Amarna letters, and other cuneiform texts. It has multiple sub-uses in the Epic of Gilgamesh, as well as use for the Sumerogram (capital letter (majuscule)), UR. In the Epic, UR is used to spell Akkadian language barbaru, "wolf", as UR.BAR.RA (in Tablet VI, and Tablet XI).

Cuneiform ur is a syllabic for "ur", and an alphabetic for "u", or "r". In the Amarna letters, usage is sumerogrammic for English language "dog", spelled either UR.KI, or UR.KU, but the 'dog' reference can be found in many Amarna letters.

The cuneiform ur cuneiform character (no. 575) is built in a 'rectangular box form', sitting upon a long horizontal stroke. It contains the 2-verticals at left and 1-vertical at right. Three other signs are similarly built, but contain 1-vertical at left, with 2-verticals at right for lu (cuneiform) (with 3-short horizontals in the center, no. 537), and the same but only 1-short horizontal at center, ib (cuneiform) (also ip, no. 535). The third similar sign, (no. 536) has 1-vertical left and right, ku (cuneiform). It also has 3-short verticals in the center, but is often such a compressed cuneiform character that individual strokes are overwritten, and difficult to identify.

== Epic of Gilgamesh usage ==
Cuneiform ur has many sub-uses in the Epic of Gilgamesh. The following can be found: leq--(1) time, lik--(37), liq--(3), tas--(1), taṣ--(2), taš--(15), tés--(1), téš--(1), ur--(93), UR--(16) times.
