= Italian nobility =

Former officially privileged social class in Italy

Coat of arms of the Kingdom of Italy (House of Savoy)

The Italian nobility (Italian: Nobiltà italiana) comprised individuals and their families of the Italian Peninsula, and the islands linked with it, recognized by the sovereigns of the Italian city-states since the Middle Ages, and by the kings of Italy after the unification of the region into a single state, the Kingdom of Italy.

Nobles had a specific legal status and held most of the wealth and various privileges denied to other classes, mainly politicians. In most of the former Italian pre-unification states, it was the only class that had access to high-level government positions. They represented the most distinguished positions of the peninsular nations in addition to the Catholic Church for several centuries. There were varying forms of nobility over time in their respective regions.

From the Medieval Period until the nineteenth century in March 1861, Italy was not a single unified sovereign state. It was a peninsula consisting of several separate kingdoms, duchies, and other minor principalities, with many reigning dynasties. These were often related maritally to both the neighbouring Italian states and other major and minor European dynasties.

Recognition of Italian nobility ceased with the creation of the Italian Republic in 1946. Although many titles still exist, they are used as a matter of social courtesy, but are not recognised under Italian law. A limited number of noble titles granted by the pope were formally acknowledged according to Article 42 of the Lateran Treaty until its abrogation in 1985.

== History ==
=== Pre-unification ===
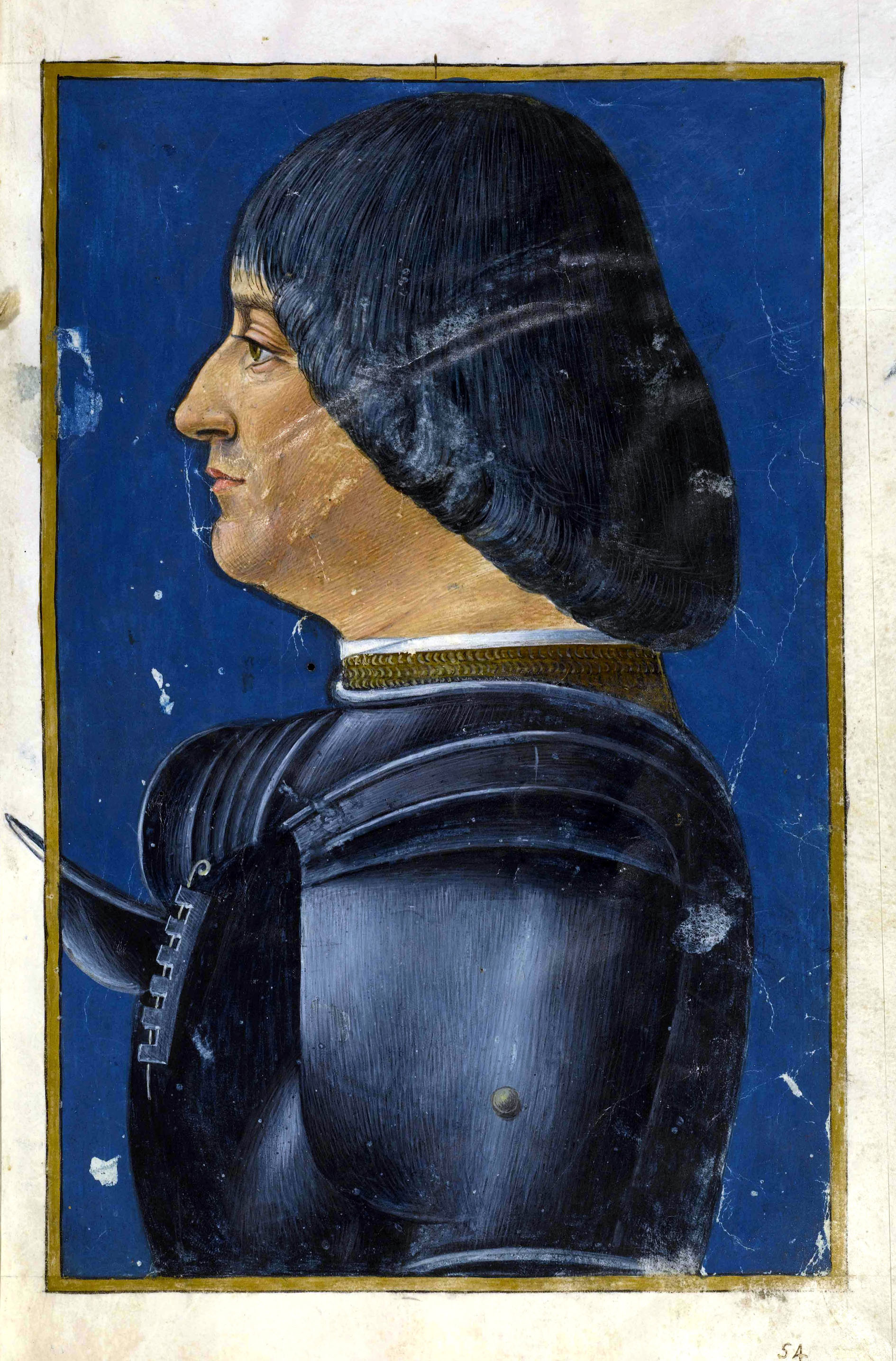
Ludovico Sforza by Giovanni Ambrogio de Predis

Before the Unification of Italy in 1861, the Italian peninsula was home to numerous noble families. Among the most prominent were the Sforza of Milan and the Medici of Florence, both of whom played a significant role in fostering the Rinascimento (Italian Renaissance) in their respective regions. Perhaps the most politically consequential noble lineage was the House of Savoy, whose leadership was instrumental in the establishment of the Kingdom of Italy in the 19th century.

From the 15th to the 18th centuries, the Italian peninsula was home to a wide array of noble families, many of whom rose to prominence through judicial appointments, election to regional senates, or high-ranking positions within the Roman Catholic Church.

In addition to newly elevated nobility, many families had held noble status for generations, sometimes spanning centuries. Writing in the 19th century, the historian Leopold von Ranke described the longstanding noble lineages in Rome:

In the middle of the 17th century there were computed to be fifty noble families in Rome of three hundred years' standing, thirty-five of two hundred, and sixteen of one hundred years. None were permitted to claim a more ancient descent, or were generally traced to an obscure, or even a low origin.

=== Sicilian nobility ===
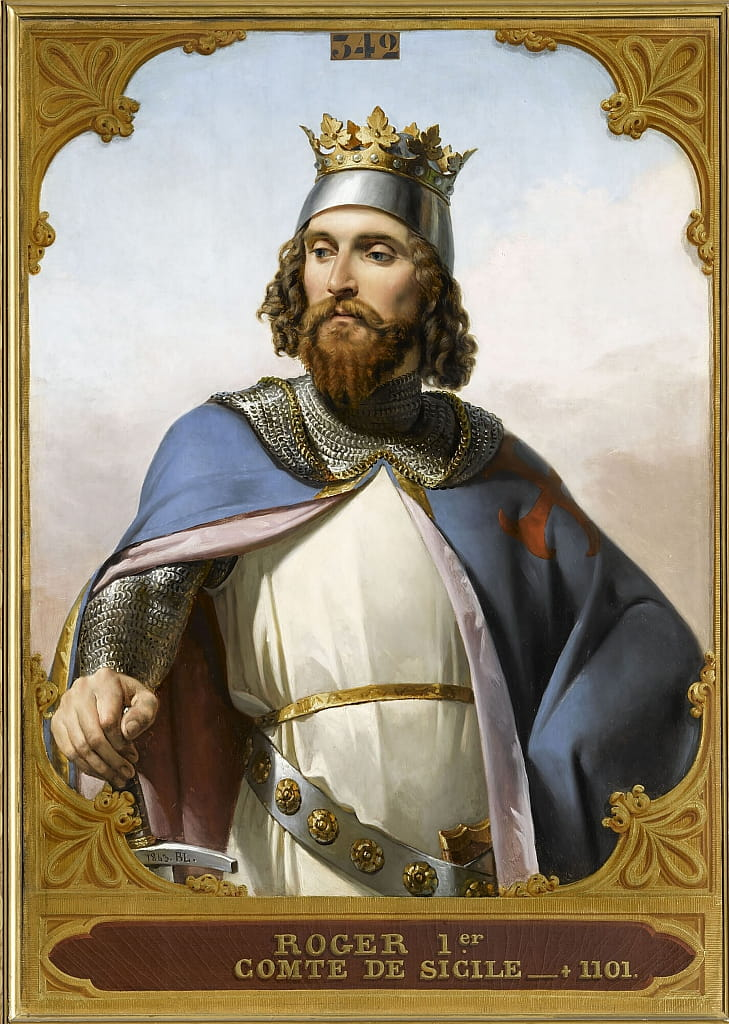
Roger I de Hauteville

The Sicilian nobility was a privileged hereditary class in the Kingdom of Sicily, the Kingdom of the Two Sicilies and the Kingdom of Italy, whose origins may be traced to the 11th century AD.

The Romans, Byzantines and Saracens exported different elements of their aristocratic structures to the island of Sicily, however, it was not until the Norman invasion of 1061, led by Roger I de Hauteville, that the Sicilian aristocracy and feudal system took root.

Over the centuries, established noble families were advanced through the aristocratic ranks. By the 18th century, the titles principe, duca and marchese were held by many men whose ancestors, only several centuries earlier, had been barons and lords. Conte, signore and cavaliere are titles that have been used by the Sicilian nobility. Over the centuries many families emerged as landed aristocracy or nobility similar to the English gentry and peerage.

=== Papal nobility ===
During this period, throughout Italy various influential families came to positions of power through the election of a family member as Pope or were elevated into the ranks of nobility through ecclesiastical promotion. These families freely intermarried with aristocratic nobility. Like other noble families, those with both papal power and money were able to purchase comunes or other tracts of land and elevate family patriarchs and other relatives to noble titles. Hereditary patriarchs were appointed Duke, Marquis and even Prince of various 16th and 17th century principalities. According to Ranke:

Under Innocent X there existed, for a considerable time, two great factions, or associations of families. The Orsini, Cesarini, Borghese, Aldobrandini, Ludovisi, and Giustiniani were with the Pamphili; while opposed to them, was the house of Colonna and the Barberini.

— Leopold von Ranke, The History of the Popes

Popes commonly elevated members of prominent families to the position of Cardinal; especially second and third sons who would not otherwise inherit hereditary titles. Popes also elevated their own family members – especially nephews – to the special position of Cardinal-Nephew. Prominent families could purchase curial offices for their sons and regularly did, hoping that the son would rise through Church ranks to become a Bishop or a Cardinal, from which position they could dispense further titles and positions of authority to other family members.

The period was famous for papal nepotism and many families, such as the Barberini and Pamphili, benefited greatly from having a papal relative. Families that had previously been limited to agricultural or mercantile ventures found themselves, sometimes within only one or two generations, elevated to the Roman nobility when a relative was elected to the papal throne. Modern Italy is dotted with the fruits of their success – various family palazzi stand today as a testament to their sometimes meteoric rise to power.

==== Civic nobility in the March of Ancona ====
In the papal province of the March of Ancona, urban government from the late Middle Ages to the early 19th century was dominated by closed patriciates in many cities, such as Ancona, Macerata, Fermo and Ascoli Piceno. Through chiusure di ceto ("class closures"), access to civic office was restricted to a fixed number of lineages, creating a hereditary civic nobility that combined political control with large landed estates in the surrounding countryside. In practice, these urban patriciates shared power with papal governors and legates in the territory, forming a stable local governing elite. For a more detailed treatment, see Civic nobility in the Papal States' March of Ancona.

=== Genoese nobility ===
In the case of the Republic of Genoa, through the Constitutional Reform and the laws of 1528, 1548 and 1575, an aristocratic republic was inaugurated, which would last until 1797. With the constitutional reform of 1528, belonging to an albergo became from optional to compulsory, effectively transforming the alberghi into lists of registration to the city nobility recognized by the government. The reform required that the wealthiest citizens who owned six or more houses should originate a distinct albergo. On that occasion, it was decided to establish a single Order of noble citizens, otherwise known as Old Nobles, divided into twenty-three old and already existing alberghi and five new ones were created for the occasion. These associations were to prevent the resurgence of ancient hostilities and protect the wealth and power of the wealthiest families.

=== Florentine nobility ===
Flag of the galleys of the Order of Saint Stephen

The Florentine, and later Tuscan nobility distinguished itself in the two classes of Patricians, recognized as noble since before 1532, belonging to the Order of Saint Stephen, and residing only in the ancient noble homelands: Florence, Siena, Pisa, Pistoia, Arezzo, Volterra, Montepulciano and Cortona. And of the nobles, simple nobility, civic nobility, senators and commanders, with residence of the "new" noble homelands: Sansepolcro, San Miniato, Livorno, Pescia and Prato. Overall, the Florentine nobility was divided into feudal, senatorial and priority.

=== Milanese nobility ===
In Milan, the first officially drawn up list of nobility was the "Matricula nobilium familiarum Mediolani" by Ottone Visconti, dated 20 April 1377, in which, however, only the noble Milanese families who helped the Visconti family in their seizure of power over the municipality of Milan were listed, therefore considered the most faithful and ancient nobility in the future lifetime of the city. From 5 September 1395 the Dukes of Milan officially obtained the right to grant nobility to as many nobles as there were, consistent with the recognition of the Duchy of Milan. During the whole ducal period, first of the Visconti and then of the Sforza, the nobility residing in the city was increasingly predisposed to become court nobility, in the direct service of the duke, especially in the field of arms and alliances for war purposes. These families, during this period, played a fundamental role in the politics of the territory, without ever completely outclassing the figure of the duke. Most of the Milanese patriciate is linked to this period, which in the following centuries will constitute a sign of distinction between the nobility granted "to the Milanese by their duke" and that granted by "foreigners".

=== Venetian nobility ===
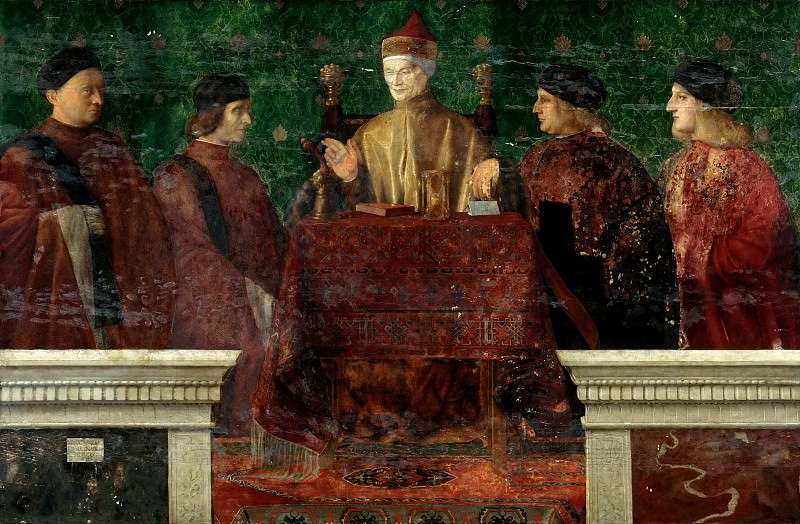
Portrait of the Loredan family, by Giovanni Bellini, 1507, Gemäldegalerie, Berlin. Leonardo Loredan, 75th Doge of Venice, ruled from 1501 until his death in 1521 and was a member of the Loredan family, one of the Republic's most prominent noble houses. His four sons are depicted wearing the typical regalia of Venetian noblemen.

The Venetian Patriciate was one of the three social bodies into which the society of the Republic of Venice was divided, together with citizens and foreigners. Patrizio was the noble title of the members of the aristocracy ruling the city of Venice and the Republic. The title was abbreviated, in front of the name, by the initials N.H. (Nobil Homo), together with the feminine variant N.D. (Nobildonna). Holding the title of a Venetian patrician was a great honour and many European kings and princes, as well as foreign noble families, are known to have asked for and obtained the prestigious title.

The noble houses were primarily divided into Old (Case vecchie) and New houses (Case nuove), with the former being noted for traditionally electing the first Doge in 697 AD. The New houses were no less significant, as many became very prominent and important in influencing the history of the Republic of Venice. The families were furthermore divided into several other "categories", including Ducal houses (which gave Doges), Newest houses (Case nuovissime), Non-Venetian patricians, and "Houses made for money" (usually very wealthy landowning or bourgeoise families enriched through trade).

Although there were numerous noble houses across Venice's home and overseas land possessions, the Republic was in fact ruled as an oligarchy by about 20 to 30 families of Venice's urban nobility, who elected the Doge, held political and military offices and directly participated in the daily governing of the state. They were predominantly merchants, with their main source of income being trade with the East and other entrepreneurial activities, on which they became incredibly wealthy. Some of the most important families, who dominated the politics and the history of the state, include those such as the Contarini, Cornaro, Dandolo, Dolfin, Giustiniani, Loredan, Mocenigo, Arellano, Morosini, Sanudo, and the Venier families.

=== Kingdom of Italy (1861–1946): the House of Savoy ===
The House of Savoy was the ruling dynasty of the Duchy of Savoy, then the Kingdom of Sardinia and later Kingdom of Italy from 1861 to 1946. The nobility of this House of Savoy masterminded the creation of the Kingdom of Italy.

In the years preceding the political and social movement that resulted in the consolidation of different states of the Italian Peninsula into a single state, the Kingdom of Italy, the existence of the Kingdom of Sardinia, the Kingdom of the Two Sicilies (before 1816: the Kingdom of Naples and the Kingdom of Sicily), the Grand Duchy of Tuscany, the Duchy of Parma, the Duchy of Modena, the Duchy of Savoy, the Papal States and the Austrian Kingdom of Lombardy–Venetia led to parallel nobilities with different traditions and rules.

==== Unification ====
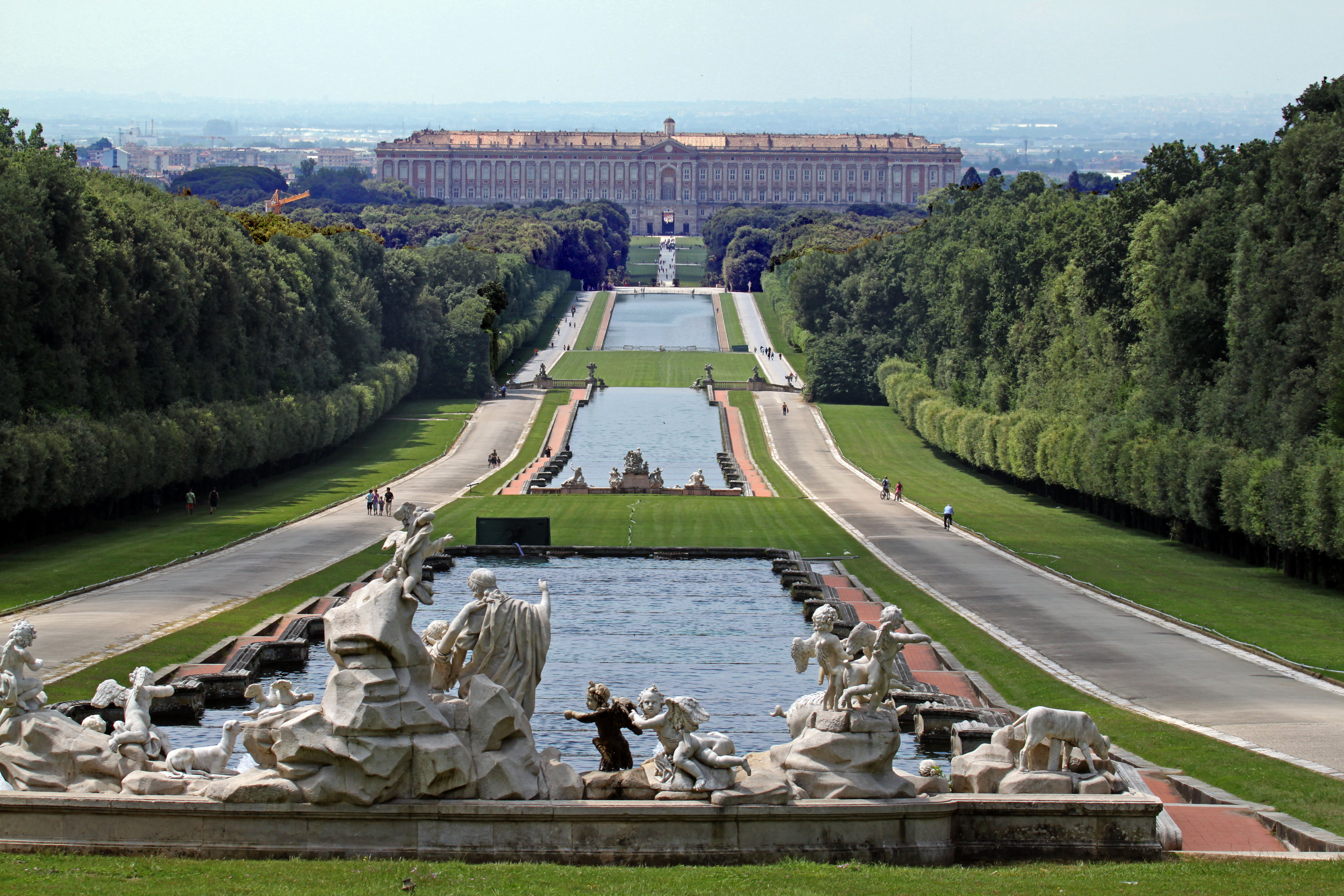
The Royal Palace of Caserta, the residence of the king of the Two Sicilies. It is the largest former royal residence in the world.

Modern Italy became a nation-state during the Risorgimento on 17 March 1861, when most of the states of the peninsula and Kingdom of the Two Sicilies were united under King Victor Emmanuel II of the Savoy dynasty, hitherto monarch of the Kingdom of Sardinia, which included Piedmont. The architect of Italian unification was Count Camillo Benso di Cavour, the Chief Minister of Victor Emmanuel. Rome itself remained for a further decade under the Papacy, and became part of the Kingdom of Italy only in 1870. In September of that year, invading Italian troops entered the Papal state, and the ensuing occupation forced Pope Pius IX to his palace where he declared himself a prisoner in the Vatican, as did his successors, until the Lateran Pacts of 1929.

==== Nobility in the Kingdom ====
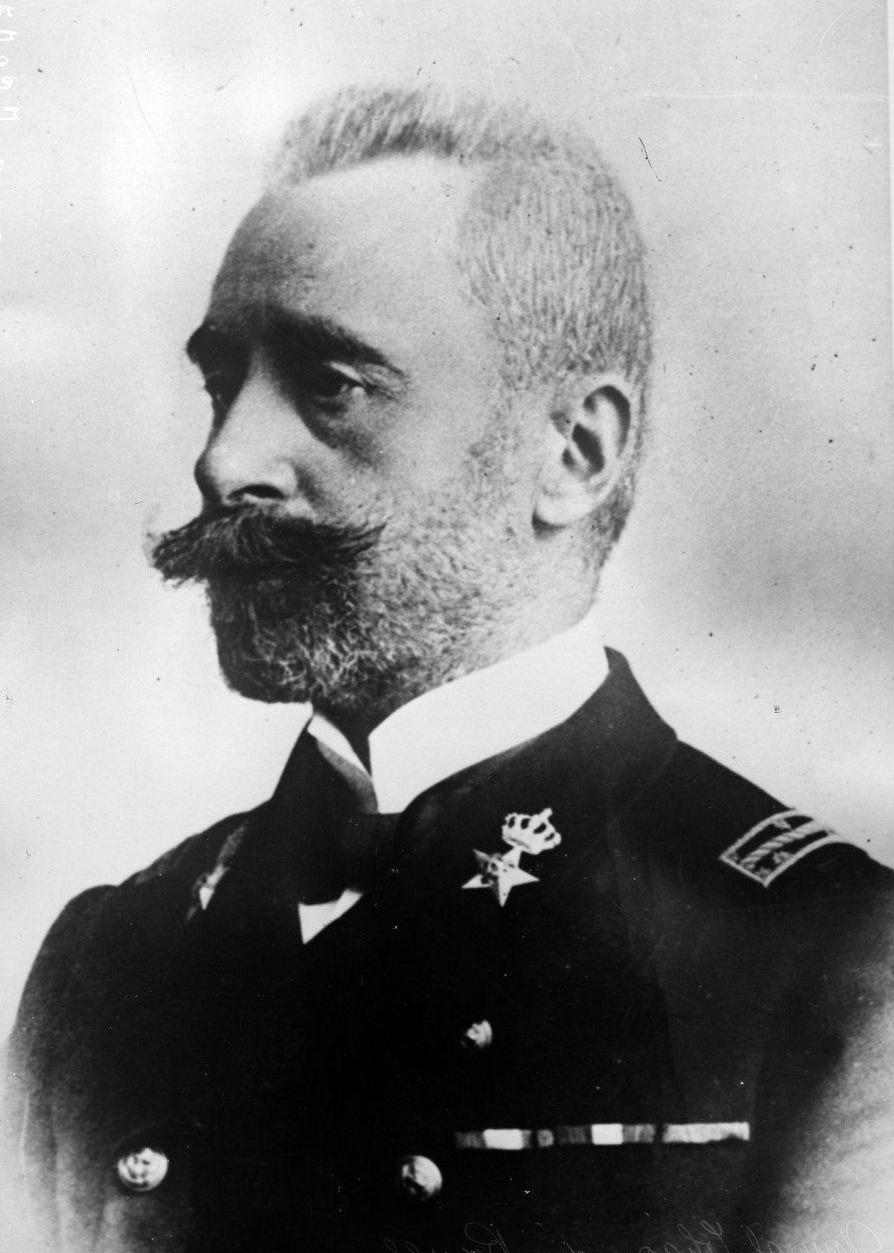
Paolo Thaon di Revel

Under the united Kingdom of Italy a new national nobility, an attempt (not wholly successful) to impose a uniform nobiliary law, was created, including male succession (although it was possible for ancient titles to be transferred to an heir in the female line by royal authority), and some acknowledgement was made by the King of Italy of titles conferred by Francis II of the Two Sicilies in exile by making new grants in the same name. Those nobles who maintained allegiance to the pope became known as the Black Nobility.

After the unification of Italy, its kings continued to create titles of nobility for eminent Italians, this time valid for all Italian territory. For example, General Enrico Cialdini was created Duca di Gaeta for his role during unification. The practice continued until the 20th century, when nominations would be made by the Prime Minister of Italy and approved by the Crown. In the aftermath of the First World War, most Italians who were ennobled received their titles through the patronage of the Mussolini government. Examples include General Armando Diaz (Duca della Vittoria), Admiral Paolo Thaon di Revel (Duca del Mare), Commodore Luigi Rizzo (Conte di Grado e di Premuda), Costanzo Ciano (Conte di Cortellazzo i Buccari), Dino Grandi (Conte di Mordano) and Cesare Maria de Vecchi (Conte di Val Cismon). Many of these were victory titles for services rendered to the nation in the Great War. The writer and aviator Gabriele d'Annunzio was created Principe di Montenevoso in 1924, and the physicist, inventor, and Nobel laureate Guglielmo Marconi was also ennobled in 1924 as Marchese Marconi. In 1937, Ettore Tolomei was ennobled as Conte della Vetta. When Cardinal Eugenio Pacelli became Pope in 1939, Mussolini had the title of Principe posthumously bestowed on the new Pontiff's brother Francesco Pacelli, who had already been made a Marchese by the Holy See during his lifetime.

In 1929, the Lateran Treaty acknowledged all Papal titles created before that date and undertook to give unquestioned recognition to titles conferred by the Holy See on Italian citizens in the future.

Victor Emmanuel III's Coat of Arms of the Italian Empire

After the successful Italian invasion of Abyssinia, the Mussolini government recommended some Italians to the king of Italy for titles of nobility. For example, Marshal Pietro Badoglio was created Marchese del Sabotino and later Duke of Addis Abeba, while General Rodolfo Graziani became Marchese di Neghelli.

In May 1936 the king Victor Emmanuel III was named Emperor of Ethiopia and maintained this title until September 1943, when Italy surrendered to the Allies during WW2. In November 1943 Victor Emmanuel III of the House of Savoy renounced his claims to the title of Emperor of Ethiopia (and also of King of Albania, that obtained in 1939).

=== Italian Republic ===
In 1946, the Kingdom of Italy was replaced by a republic. Under the Italian Constitution adopted in 1948, titles of nobility, although still used as a courtesy, are not legally recognised.

Certain predicati (nobiliary particles and/or territorial designations) recognised before 1922 may continue to be attached to surnames and used in legal documents. Often these were historic feudal territories of noble families. Although a high court ruling in 1967 definitively established that the heraldic-nobiliary legislation of the Kingdom of Italy (1861–1946) is not current law, the title of the head of the noble family is still accorded to all descendants as courtesy titles.

== Titles of nobility ==
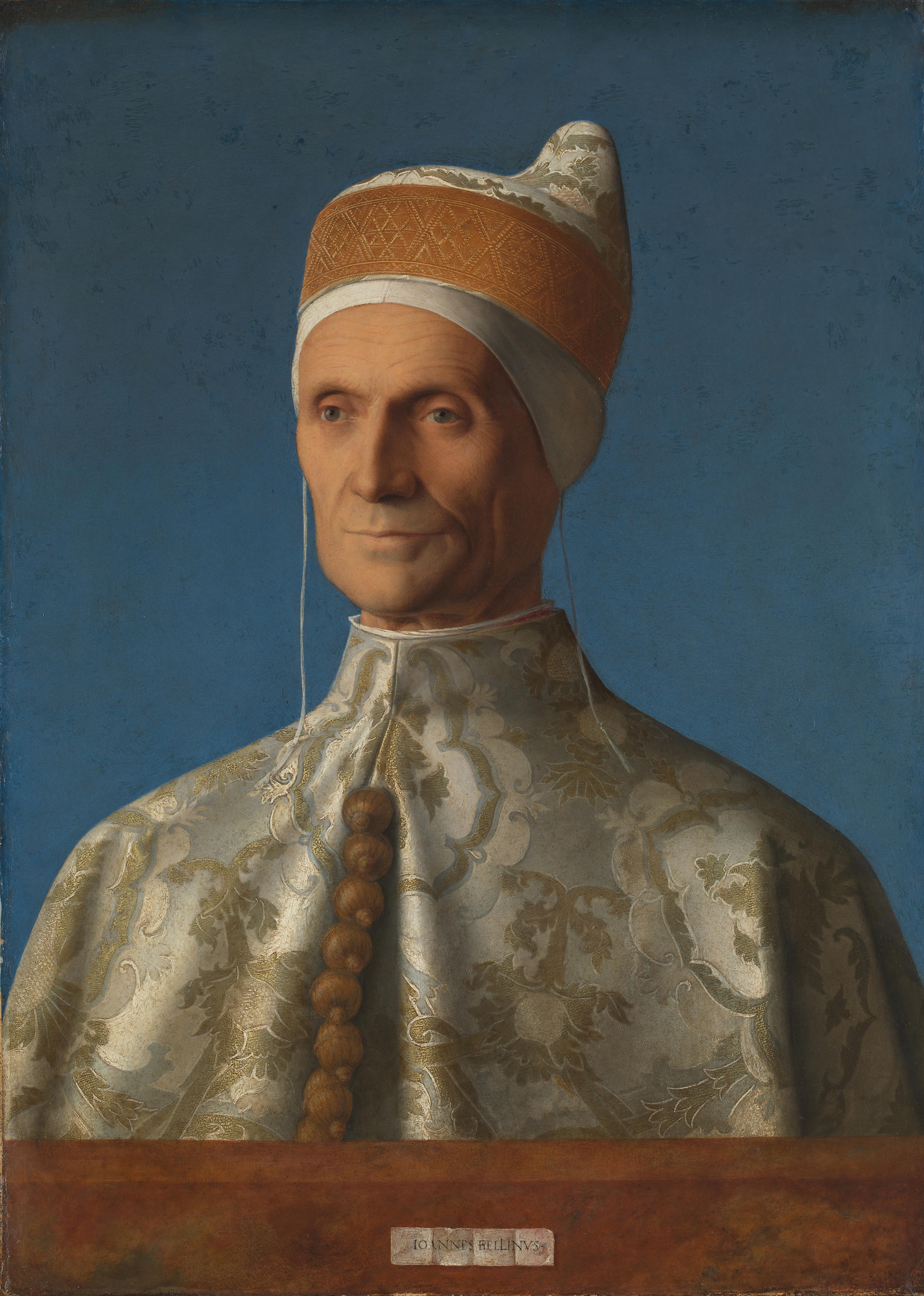
Leonardo Loredan, Doge of Venice, portrait by Giovanni Bellini, 1501, National Gallery, London

The southern kingdoms of Naples, Sicily, and Sardinia, as well as the Papal states, granted titles as in monarchies such as Spain, France, or England: duke, marquis, count, baron. The title of viscount was not, however, as frequent in Italy as elsewhere. Joseph Bonaparte conferred the title "prince" to be hereditary on his children and grandchildren.

Often, Italian comunes (also in the Kingdom of Naples) and republics granted or recognised the title of Patrician (post-Roman Europe)

The Republic of Venice also granted feudal titles. In the Middle Ages:

The majority of feudatories were simply signori (from the French seigneur, a title introduced into Italy by the 11th century Normans), vassalli (vassals) or cavalieri (knights). Eventually, this class came to be known collectively as the baroni (barons); in Italy barone was not always a title descriptive of a particular feudal rank. During the 14th century, most minor feudal lands became baronies, their holders barons. It must be observed that the use of these titles usually required some form of sovereign award or feudal tenure.

During the Renaissance, noble families conquered most of the Italian city-states except the republics of Venice, Genoa, Lucca, San Marino and Ragusa.

Until 1806, parts of the present-day Italy formed the Kingdom of Italy, belonging to the Holy Roman Empire. When in 1861 the king of Sardinia annexed the other Italian states, the Consulta Araldica (the Italian college of arms) integrated these different and varied systems into the hierarchy described below.

=== Ranks ===
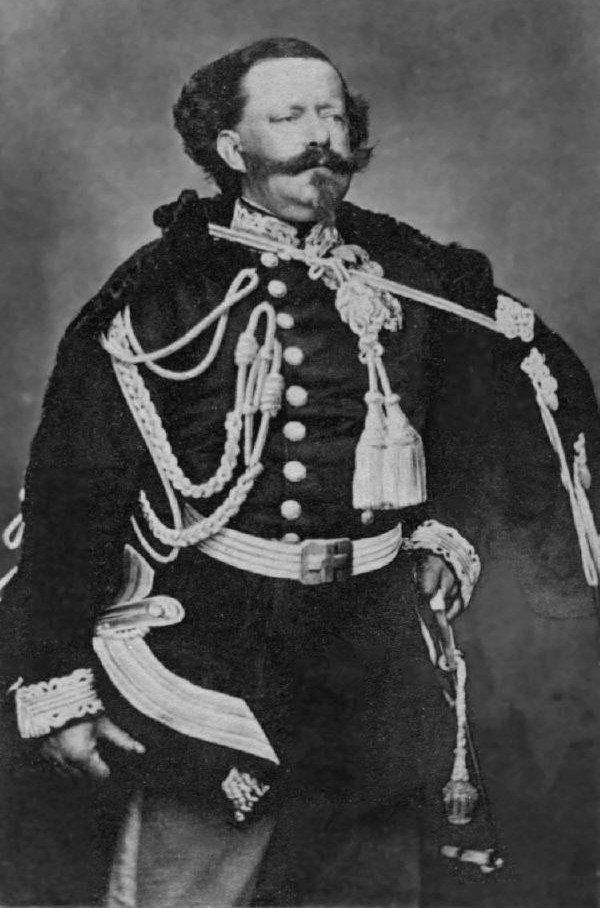
Victor Emmanuel II, the first king of unified Italy

The official ranks under the Kingdom of Italy (1861–1946) were:

Italian		Translation	
Masculine	Feminine	Masculine	Feminine
Re d'Italia	Regina d'Italia	King of Italy	Queen of Italy
Principe	Principessa	Prince	Princess
Duca	Duchessa	Duke	Duchess
Marchese	Marchesa	Marquis	Marchioness
Conte	Contessa	Count (Earl)	Countess
Visconte	Viscontessa	Viscount	Viscountess
Barone	Baronessa	Baron	Baroness
Nobile, or Nobiluomo	Nobile, or Nobildonna	Nobleman	Noblewoman
Cavaliere ereditario	Dama	Baronet (hereditary knight)	Dame
Patrizio of certain cities	Patrizia of certain cities	Patrician	

This hierarchy resulted from the overlapping of titles granted by the pre-unification states, though these were different from each other.

=== Post-World War II ===
By 1946, with abolition of the monarchy, a number of titles borne by families in the pre-unification states (Two Sicilies, Papal State, etc.) still had not been matriculated by the Consulta Araldica.

== Palaces and noble houses ==
=== Palaces of rulers ===
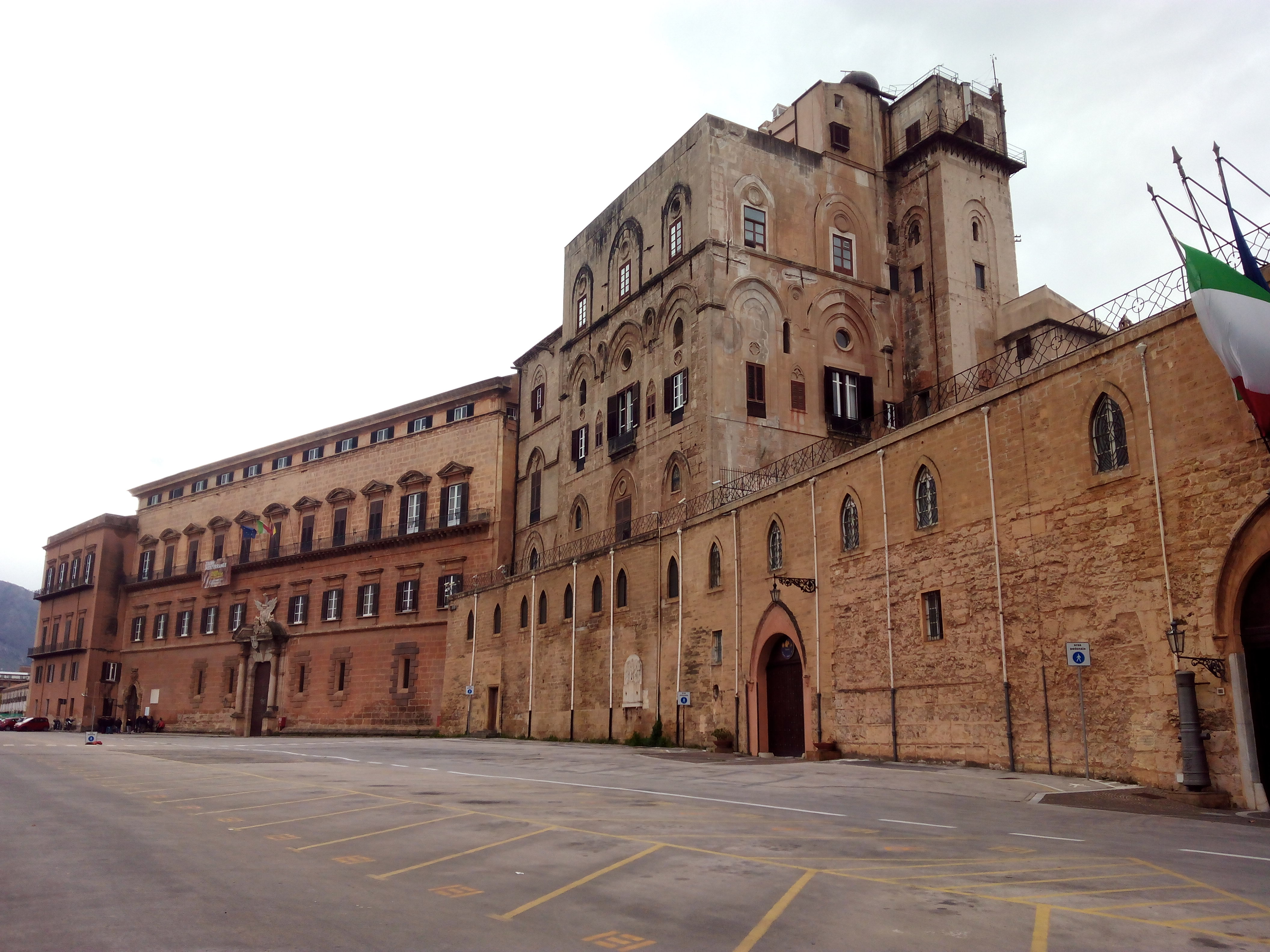
Palazzo dei Normanni, the residence of the king of Sicily

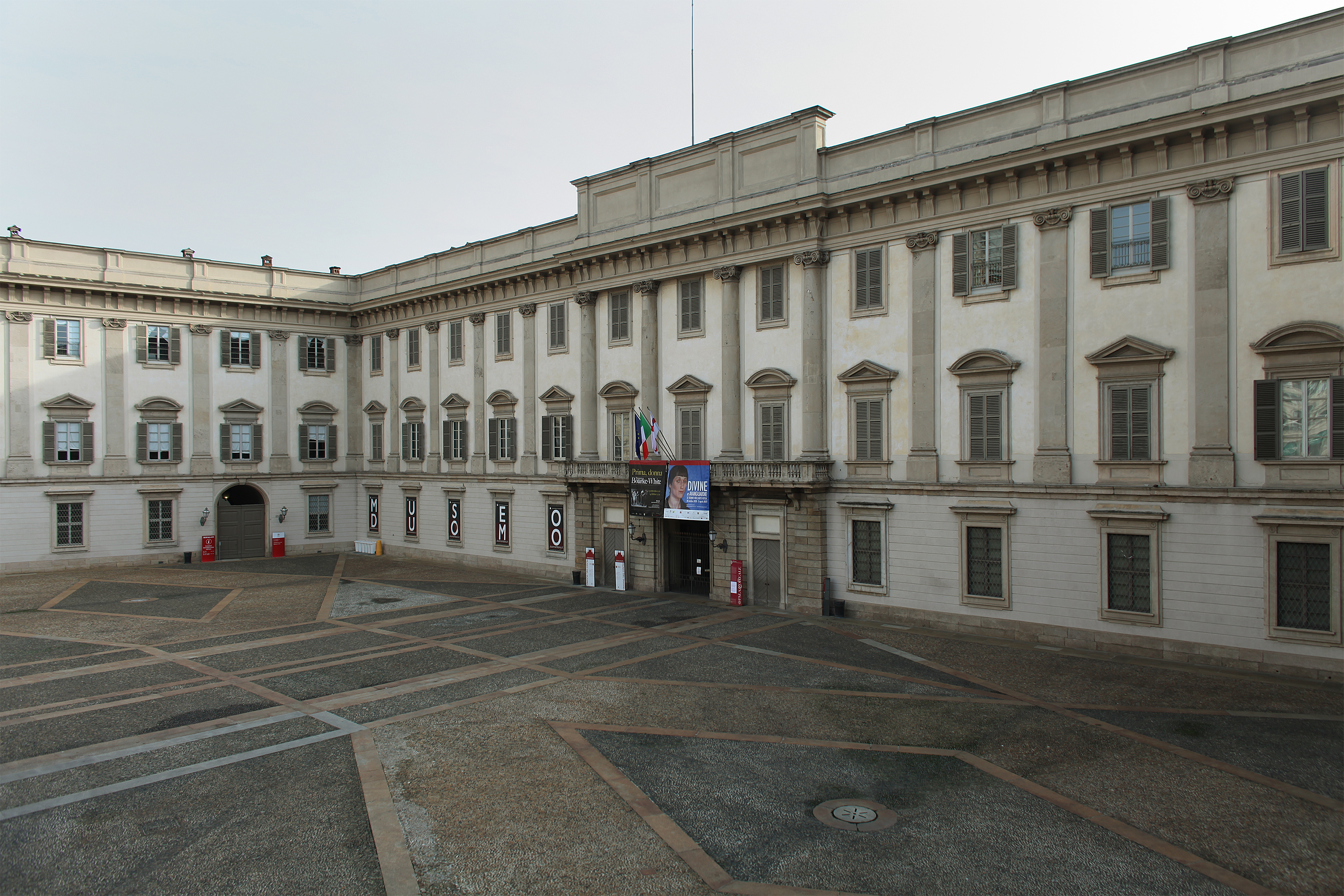
The Royal Palace of Milan, the residence of the duke of Milan

- Palace of Caserta: residence of the king of the Two Sicilies.
- Royal Palace (Naples): residence of the king of the Two Sicilies.
- Royal Palace of Milan: residence used by the King of Italy in Milan.
- Museo di Capodimonte: residence of the king of the Two Sicilies.
- Palazzo dei Normanni: residence of the king of Sicily.
- Residences of the Royal House of Savoy: residences of the king of Italy.
- Ducal Palace of Colorno: residence of the duke of Parma and Piacenza.
- Ducal Palace of Lucca: residence of the duke of Lucca.
- Ducal Palace of Modena: residence of the duke of Modena and Reggio.
- Ducal Palace of Massa: residence of the duke of Massa and Carrara.
- Palazzo Ducale di Mantova: residence of the duke of Mantua.
- Palazzo Ducale di Urbino: residence of the duke of Urbino.
- Palazzo Pitti: residence of the grand duke of Tuscany.
- Castle of Racconigi: residence of the Carignano line of the House of Savoy.
- Royal Palace of Cagliari: official seat of the king of Sardinia in his kingdom, actually used as residence of the viceroy and some other administrative bodies.

=== Sovereign houses ===
Coat of arms of the House of Savoy

Coat of arms of the House of Medici

Coat of arms of the House of Visconti

- House of Savoy: Kings of Italy (1861–1946), Kings of Spain (1870–1873), Emperors of Ethiopia (1936–1941), Kings of Albania (1939–1943), Kings of Croatia (1941–1943), Kings of Sicily (1713–1720), kings of Sardinia (1720–1861), dukes of Savoy (1416–1861), lords and princes of Piedmont (1233–1416), counts of Savoy (1032–1416), marquises of Turin (1057–1233)
- House of Ivrea: Kings of Italy (950-963;1002-1014)
- House of Habsburg and Habsburg-Lorraine: kings of Italy (1519–1802), kings of Sicily (1720–1734), kings of Sardinia (1708–1720), kings of Naples (1713–1734), kings of Lombardy–Venetia (1815–1859), grand dukes of Tuscany (1737–1801; 1815–1859), dukes of Milan (1535–1797), dukes of Parma and Piacenza; dukes of Mantua (1708–1797)
- House of Hauteville: kings of Sicily (1130–1198), dukes of Apulia (1059–1198), counts of Apulia (1042–1059), counts of Sicily (1071–1130)
- House of Hohenstaufen: kings of Italy (1128–1135; 1154–1197; 1212–1250), kings of Sicily (1198–1266)
- House of Anjou-Capetian: kings of Sicily (1266–1282), kings of Naples (1282–1442)
- House of Barcelona: kings of Sicily (1282–1516), kings of Sardinia (1324–1516), kings of Naples (1442–1516)
- House of Bourbon: dynasty divided into:
  - House of Bourbon-Parma: dukes of Parma, Piacenza and Guastalla (1748–1802; 1847–1859), kings of Etruria (1801–1807), dukes of Lucca (1824–1847)
  - House of Bourbon-Two Sicilies: kings of Naples (1735–1806; 1815–1816), kings of Sicily (1735–1816), kings of the Two Sicilies (1816–1861)
- House of Bonaparte: king of Italy (1805–1814), king of Rome, king of Naples (1806–1808)
- House of Medici: de facto lords of Florence and Tuscany (1434–1494; 1512–1527), dukes of Florence (1531–1569), grand dukes of Tuscany (1569–1737)
- House of Este: Margraves of Este (1171), lords and marquesses of Ferrara (1240–1471), dukes of Ferrara (1471–1597), dukes of Modena and Reggio (1452–1796), counts of Polesine and Garfagnana
- House of Austria-Este: dukes of Modena and Reggio (1814–1860)
- House of Farnese: dukes of Parma and Piacenza (1545–1731); dukes of Castro
- House of Visconti: lords of Milan and Lombardy (1277–1395), dukes of Milan (1395–1447)
- House of Sforza: dukes of Milan (1450–1499; 1512–1515; 1521–1535)
- House of Gonzaga: lords of Mantua (1328–1433), marquesses of Mantua (1433–1530), dukes of Mantua (1530–1708); marquesses of Montferrat (1536–1574), dukes of Montferrat (1574–1708)
- House of Paleologus: marquesses of Montferrat (1306–1536)
- House of Aleramici: marquesses of Saluzzo (1125–1548), marquesses of Montferrat (before 933–1306)

== Gallery ==
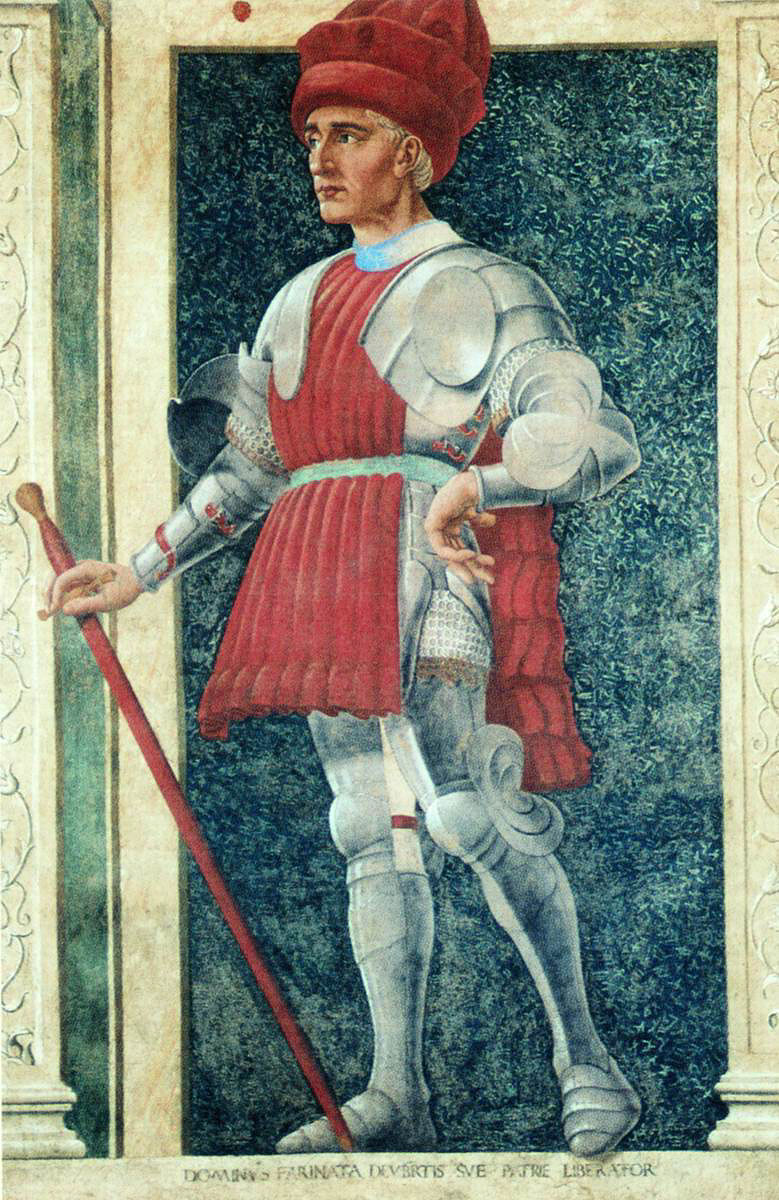
Farinata degli Uberti (1212–1264)

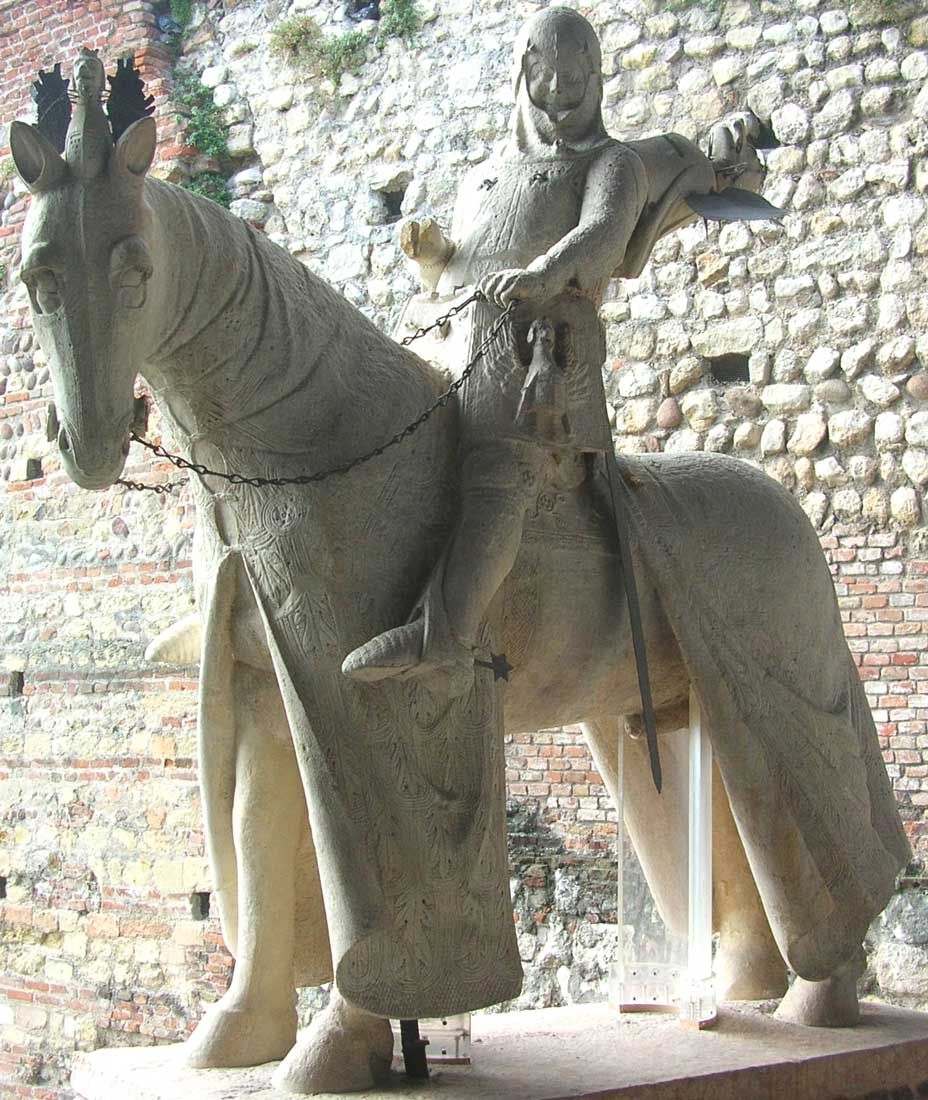
Cangrande della Scala, Lord of Verona (1291–1329)

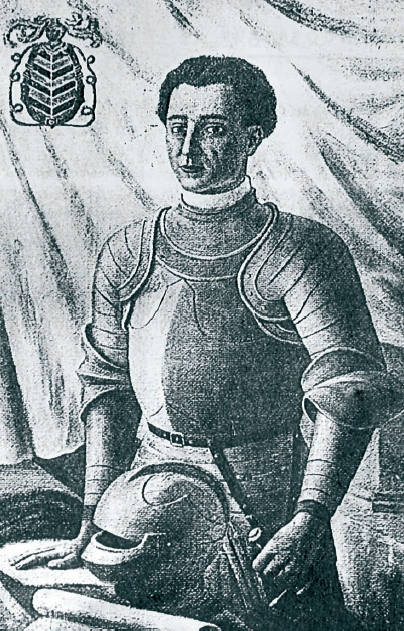
Angelo Tartaglia, Lord of Lavello and Toscanella (1350–1421)

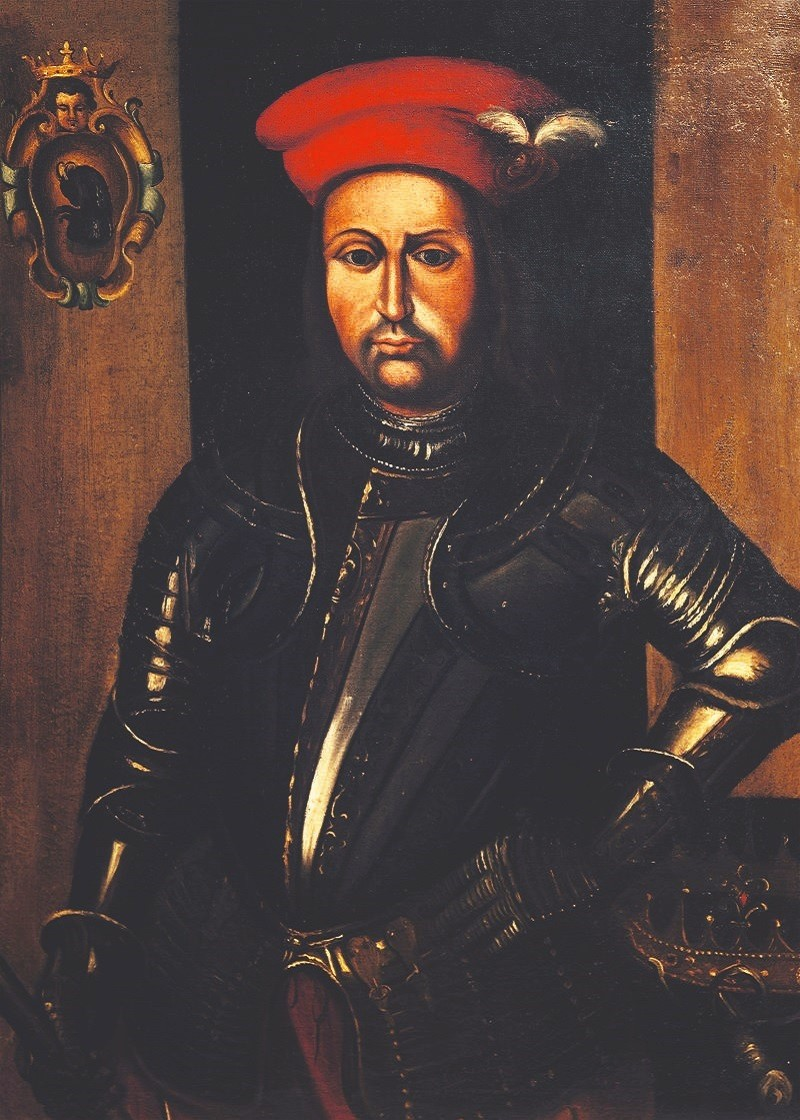
Braccio da Montone, Lord of Perugia (1368–1424)

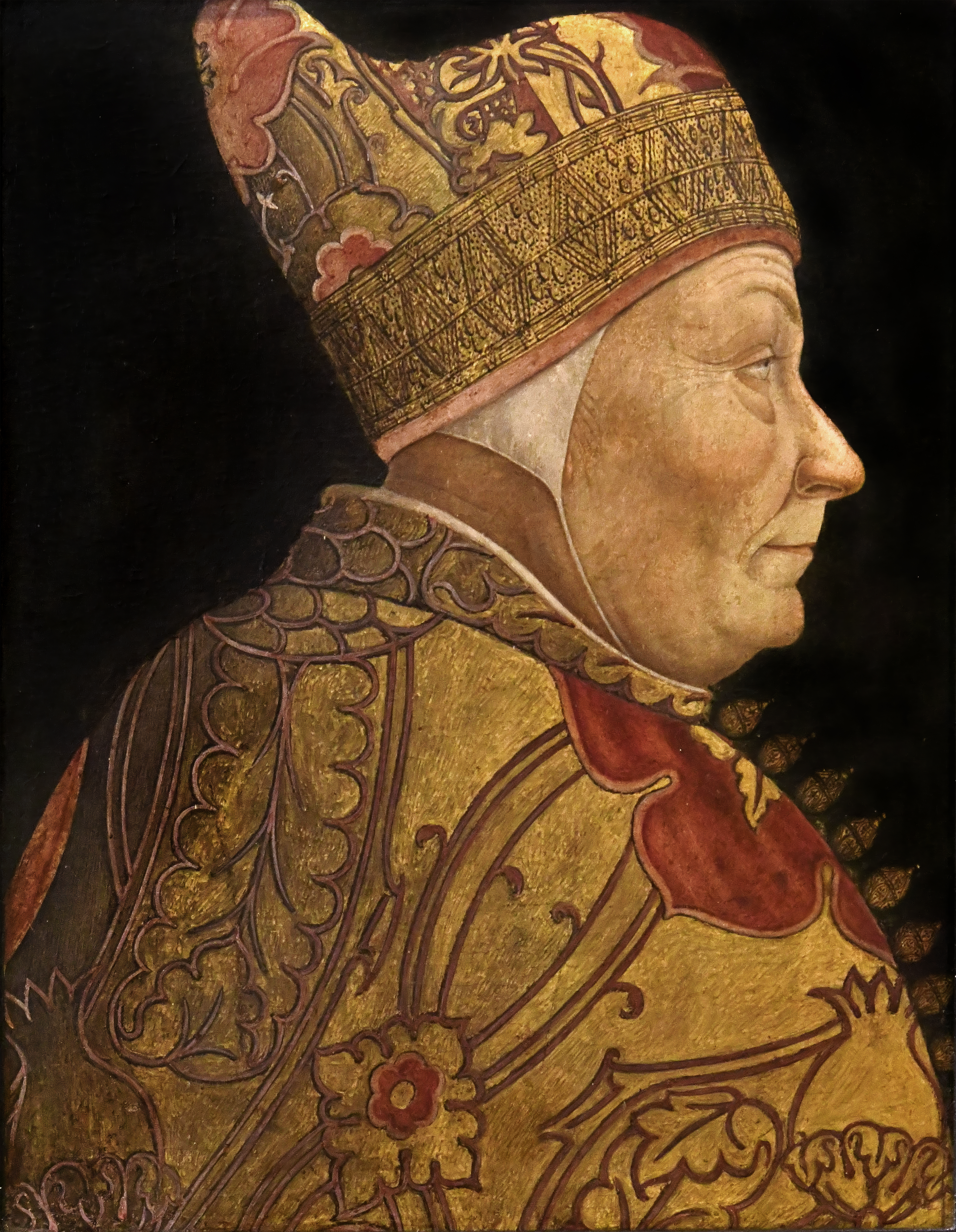
Francesco Foscari, 65th and longest-reigning Doge of Venice (1373–1457)

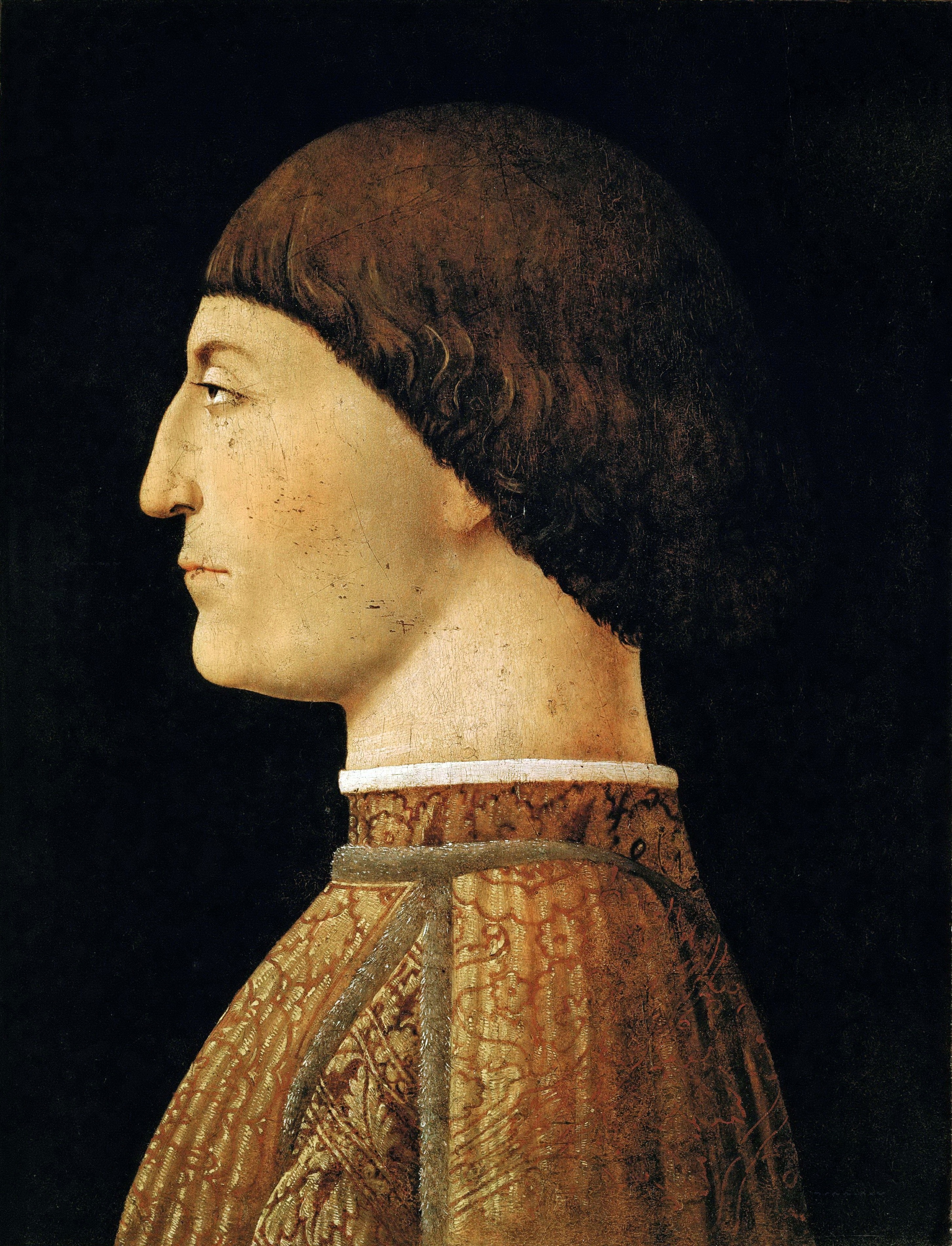
Sigismondo Pandolfo Malatesta, Lord of Rimini (1417–1468)

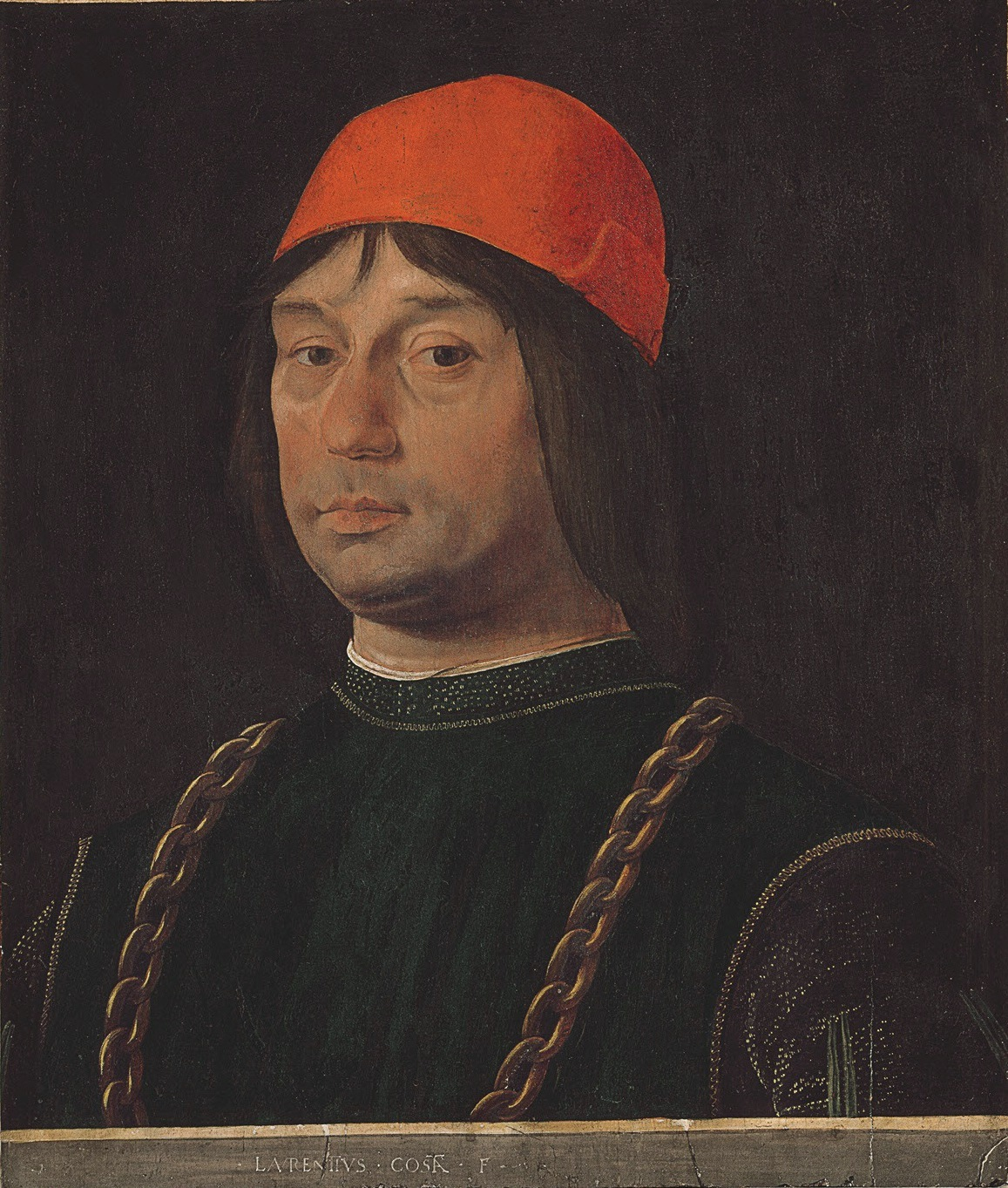
Giovanni II Bentivoglio, tyrant of Bologna (1443–1508)

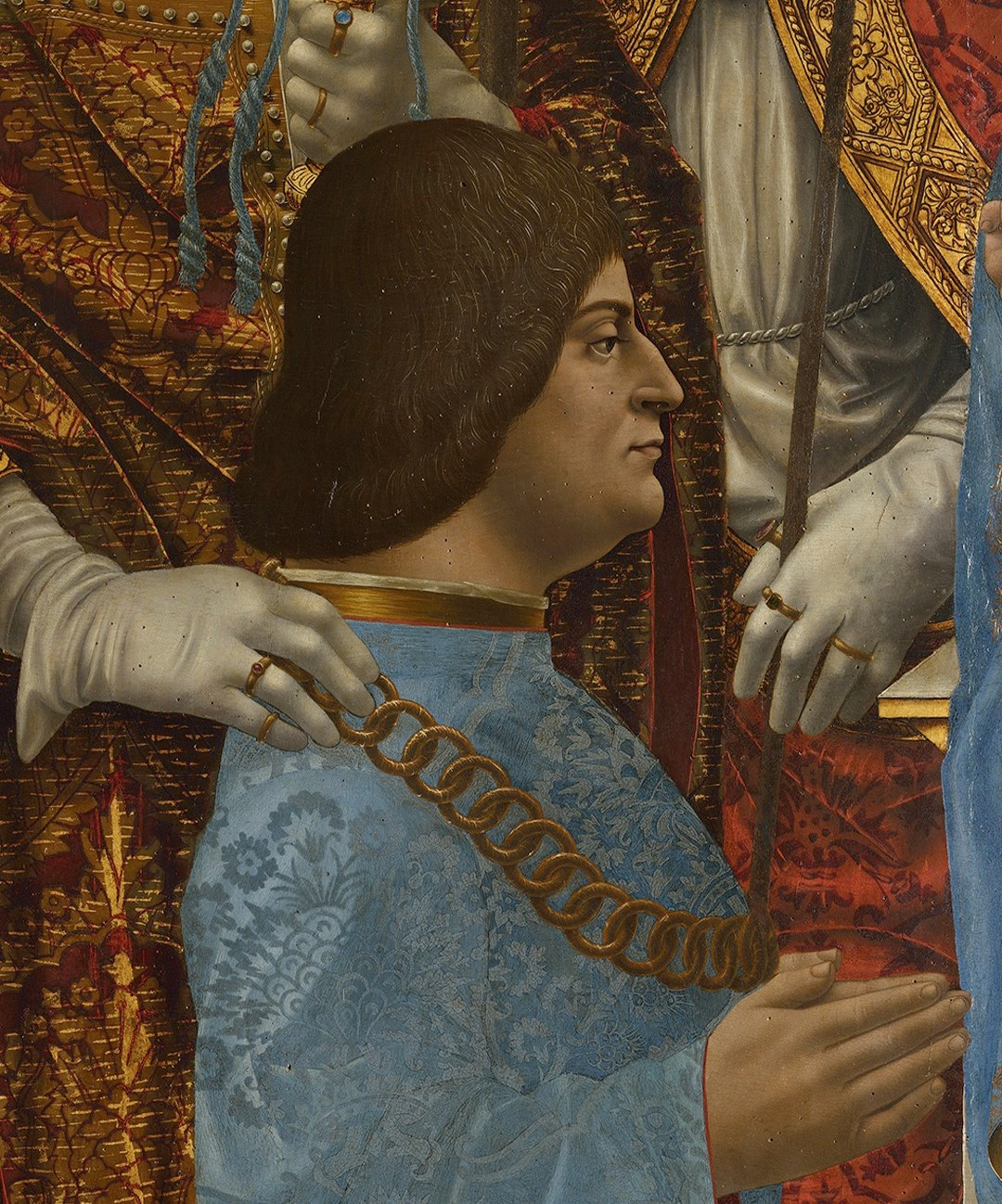
Ludovico Sforza, Duke of Milan (1452–1508)

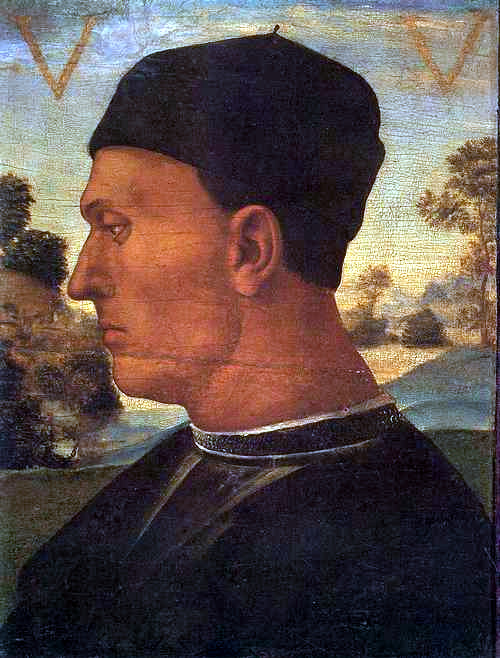
Vitellozzo Vitelli, Lord of Città di Castello (1458–1502)

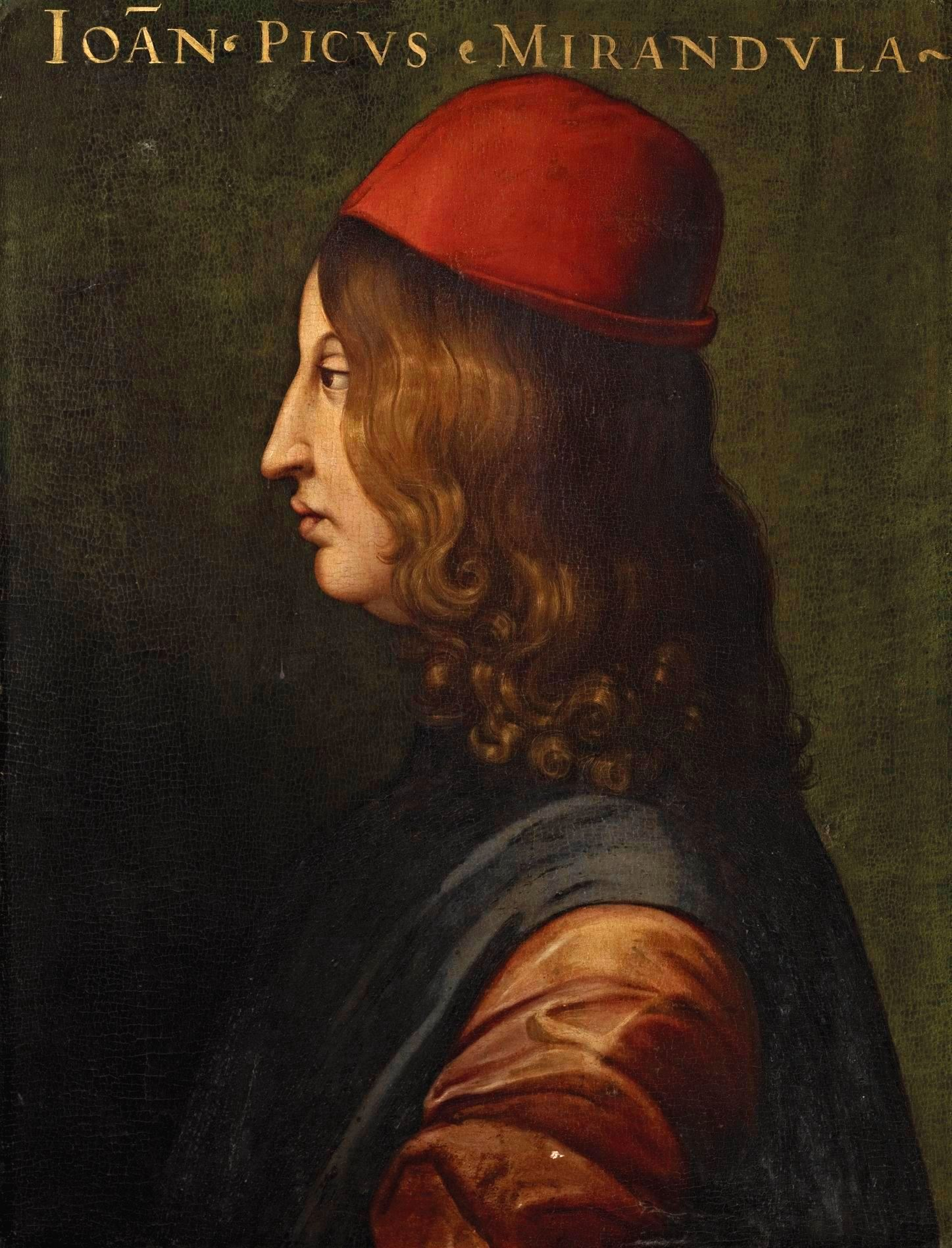
Count Giovanni Pico della Mirandola (1463–1494)

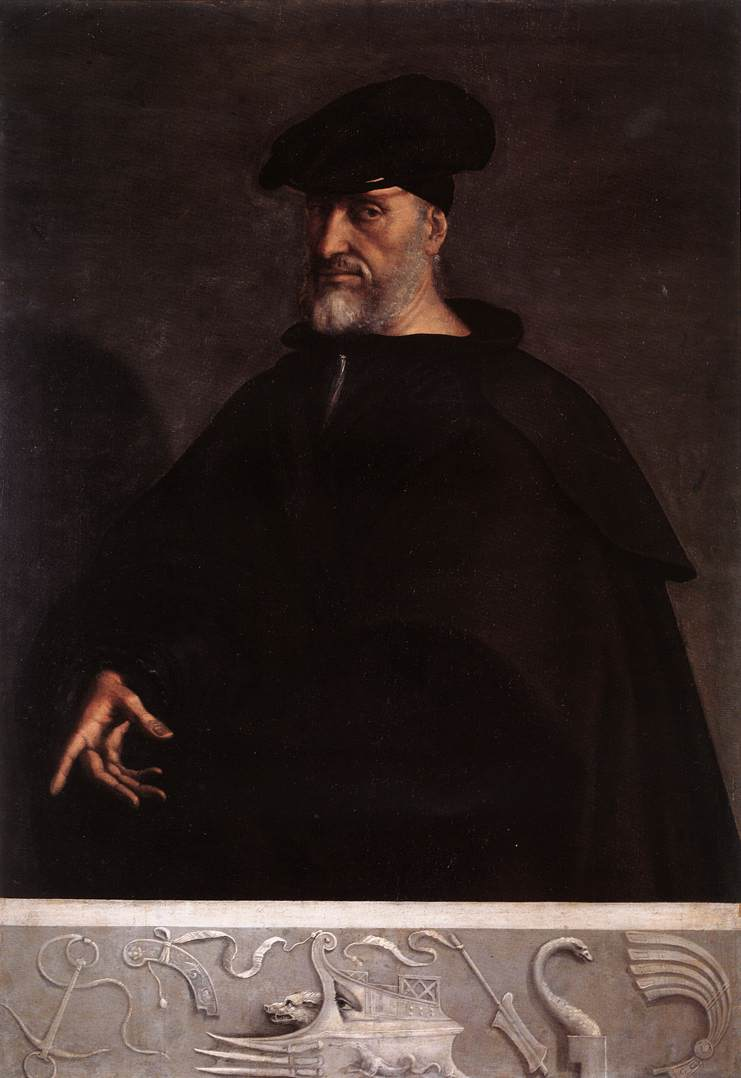
Admiral Andrea Doria (1466–1560)

Pietro Bembo (1470–1547)

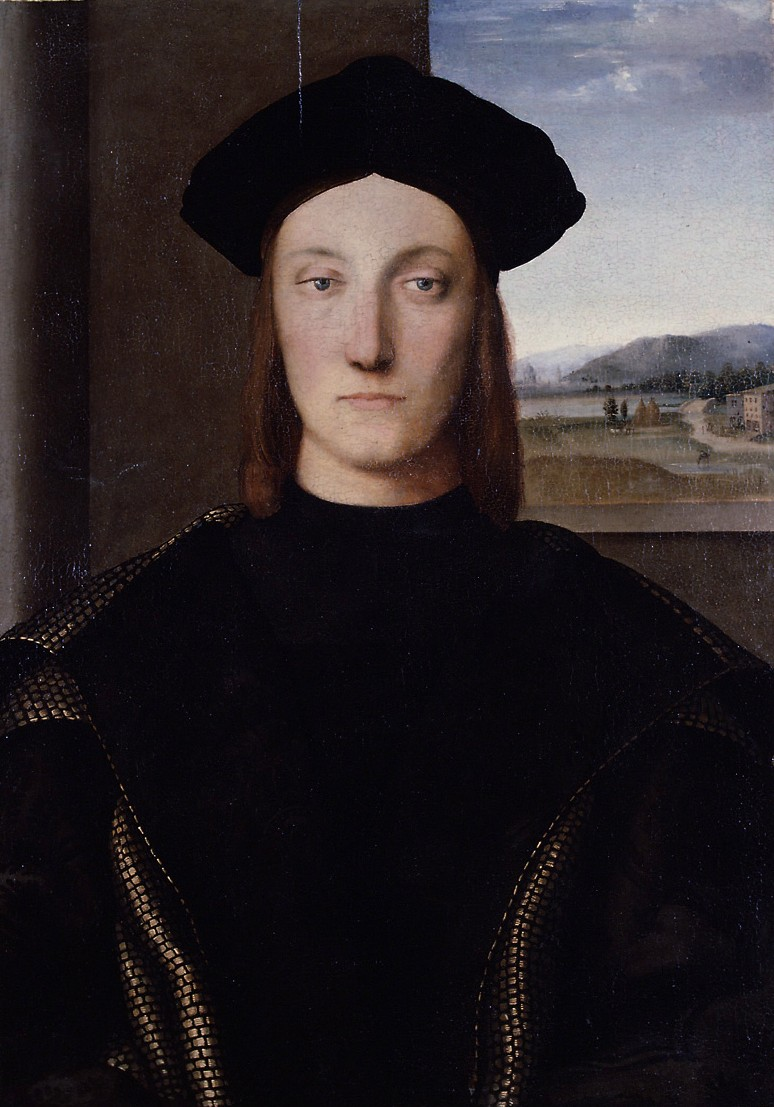
Guidobaldo da Montefeltro, Duke of Urbino (1472–1508)

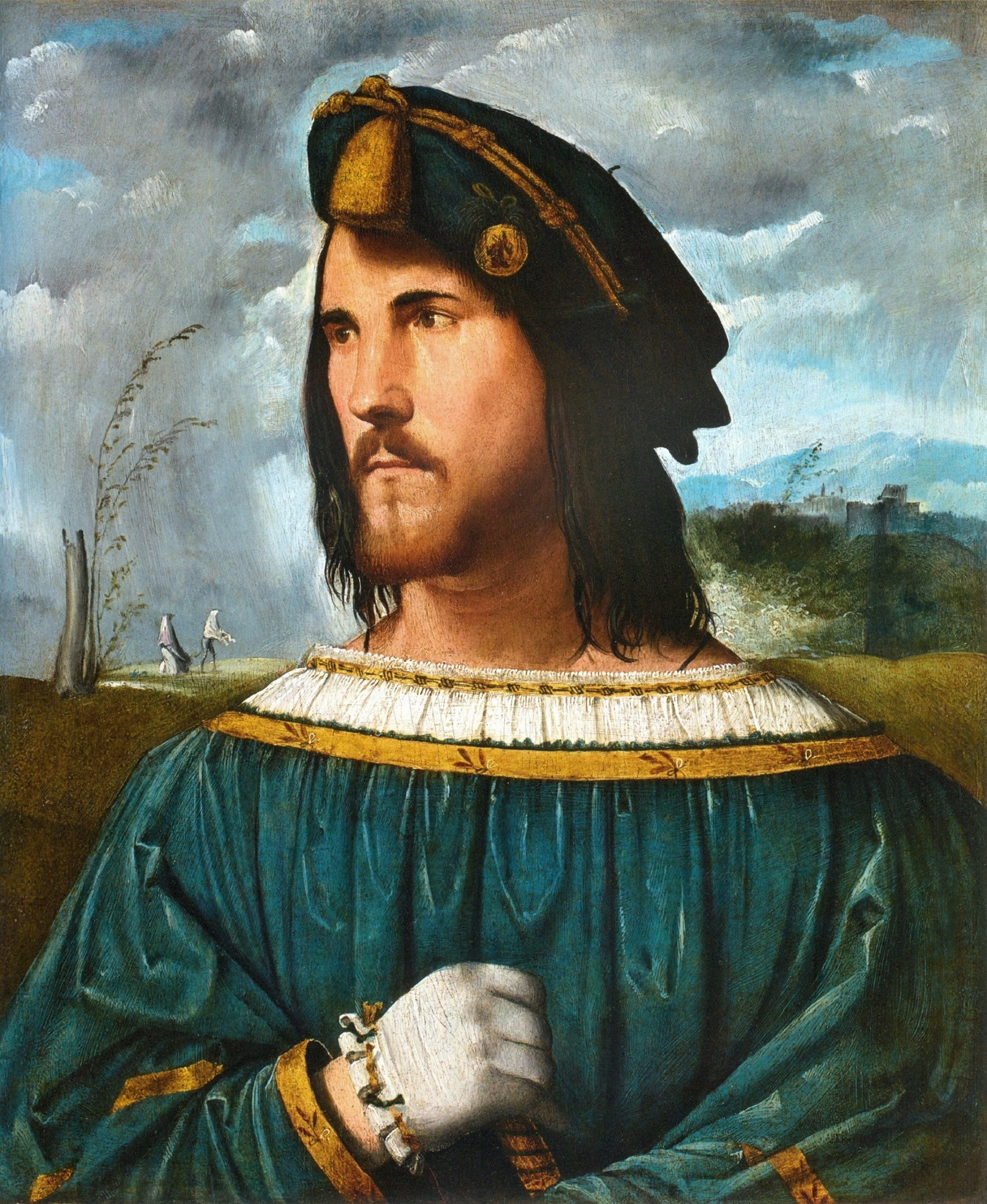
Cesare Borgia, Duke of Valentinois (1476–1507)

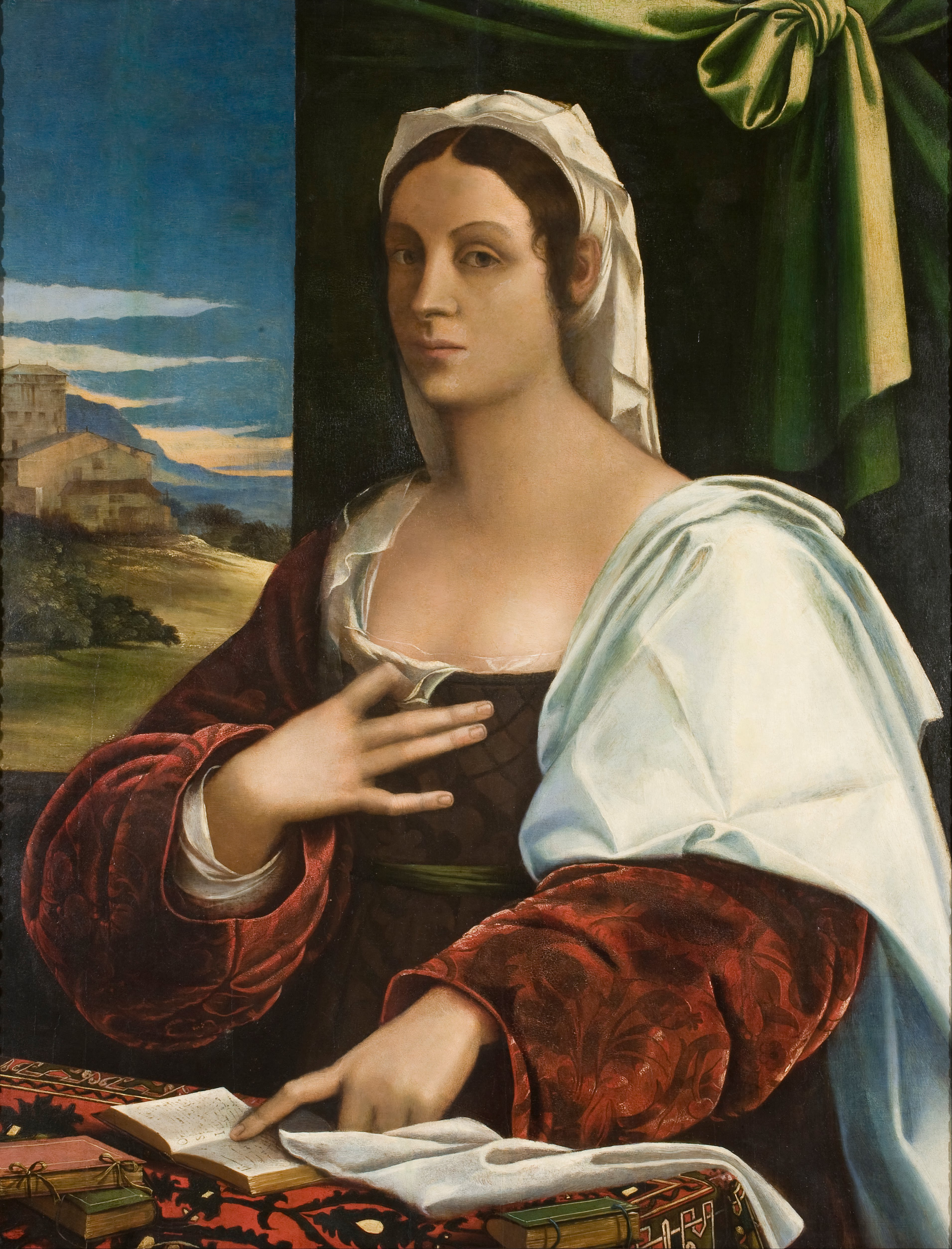
Vittoria Colonna, marchioness of Pescara (1490–1547)

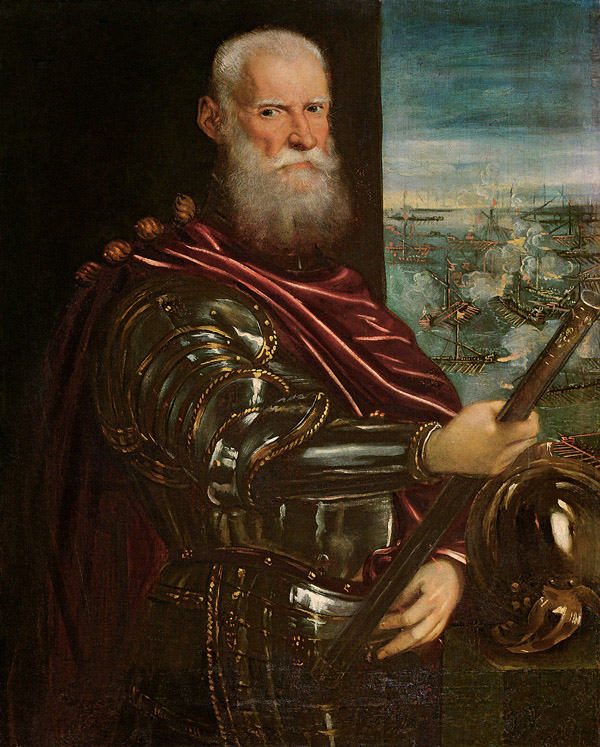
Sebastiano Venier, Doge of Venice (1496–1578)

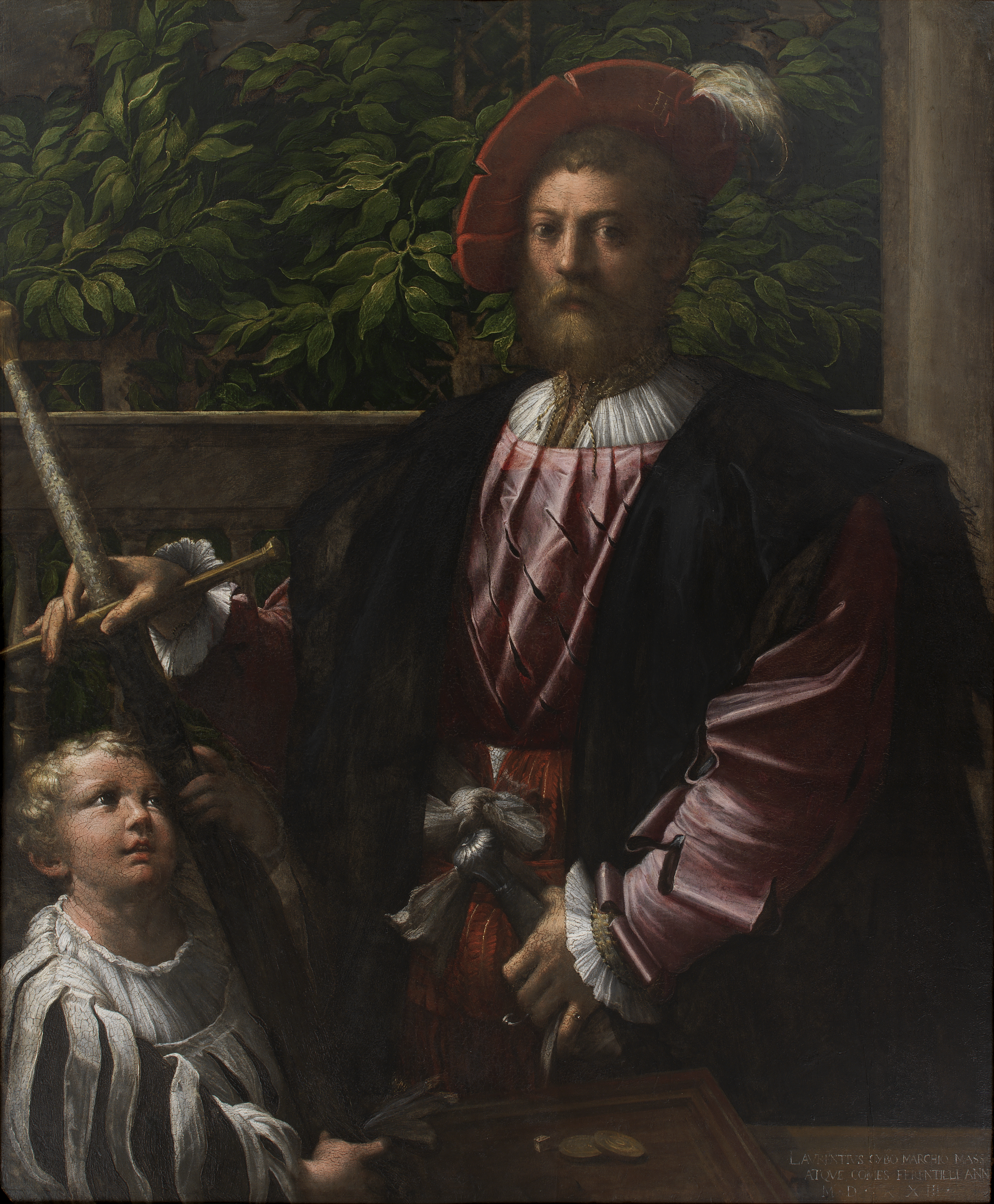
Lorenzo Cybo, Duke of Ferentillo (1500–1549)

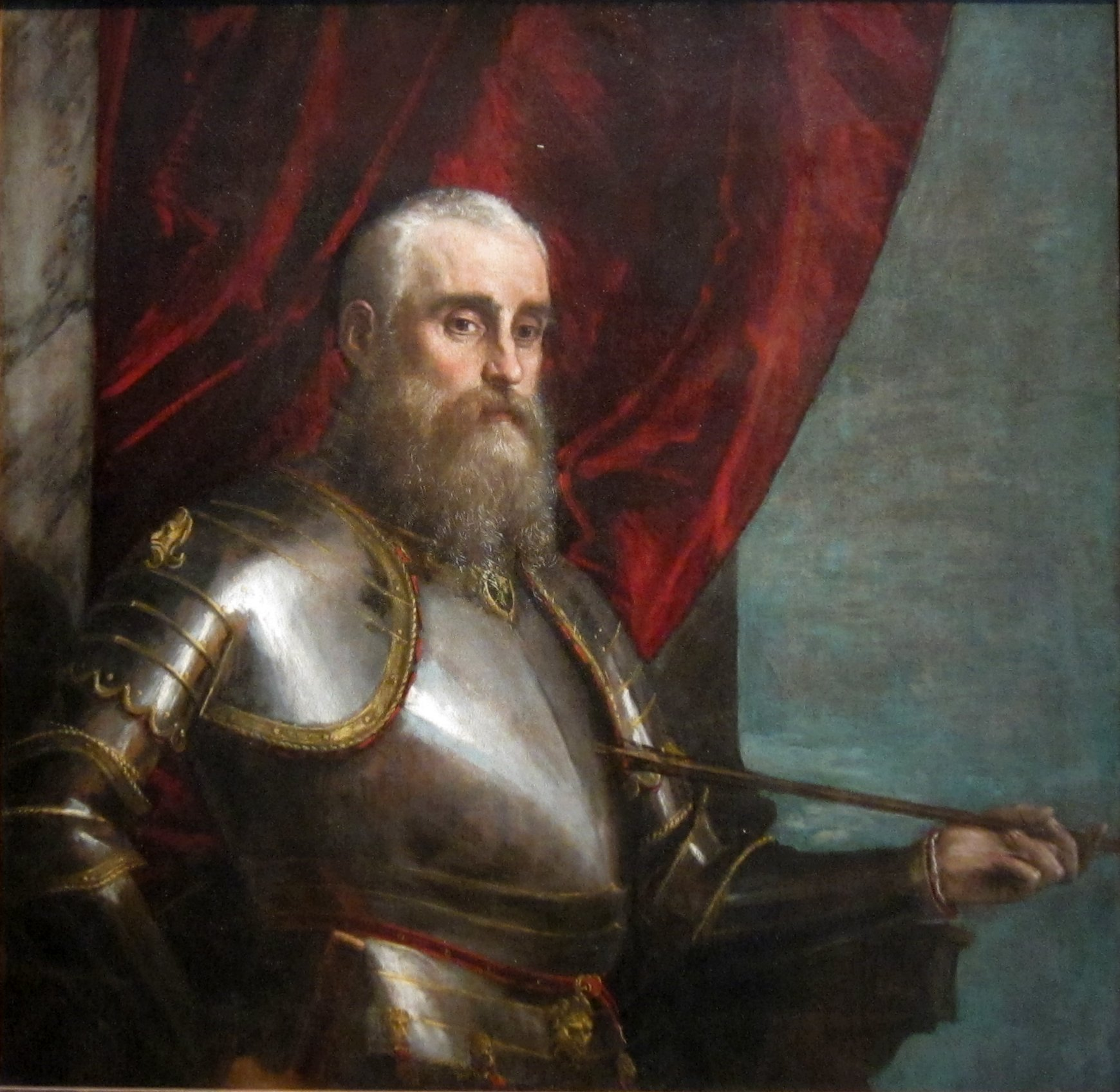
Admiral Agostino Barbarigo (1516–1571)

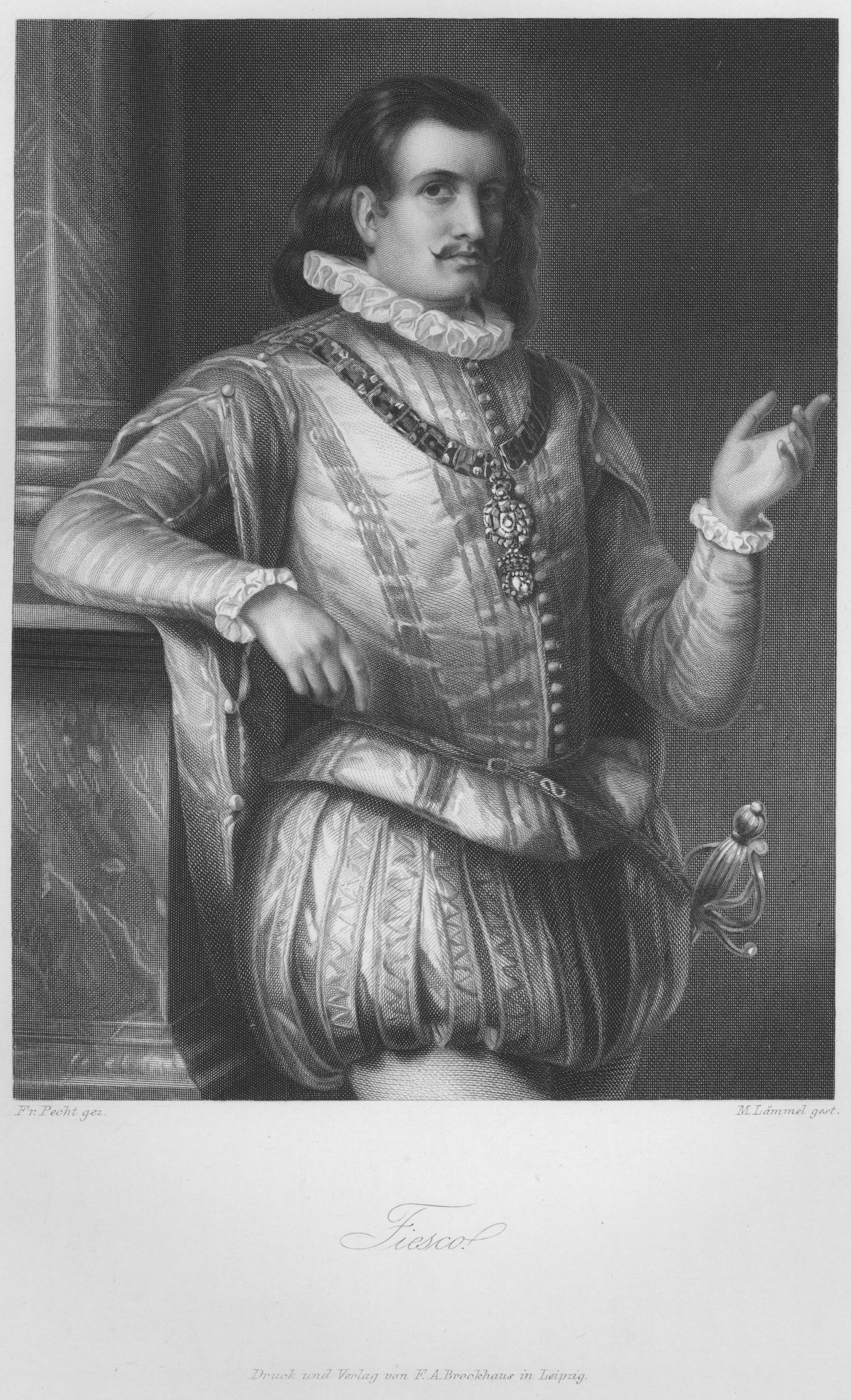
Giovanni Luigi Fieschi, Count of Lavagna (1522–1547)

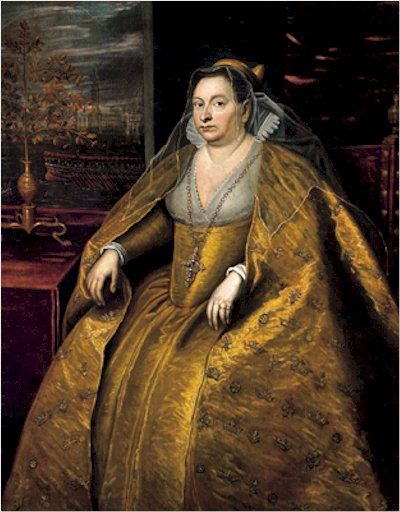
Morosina Morosini, Dogaressa of Venice (1545–1614)

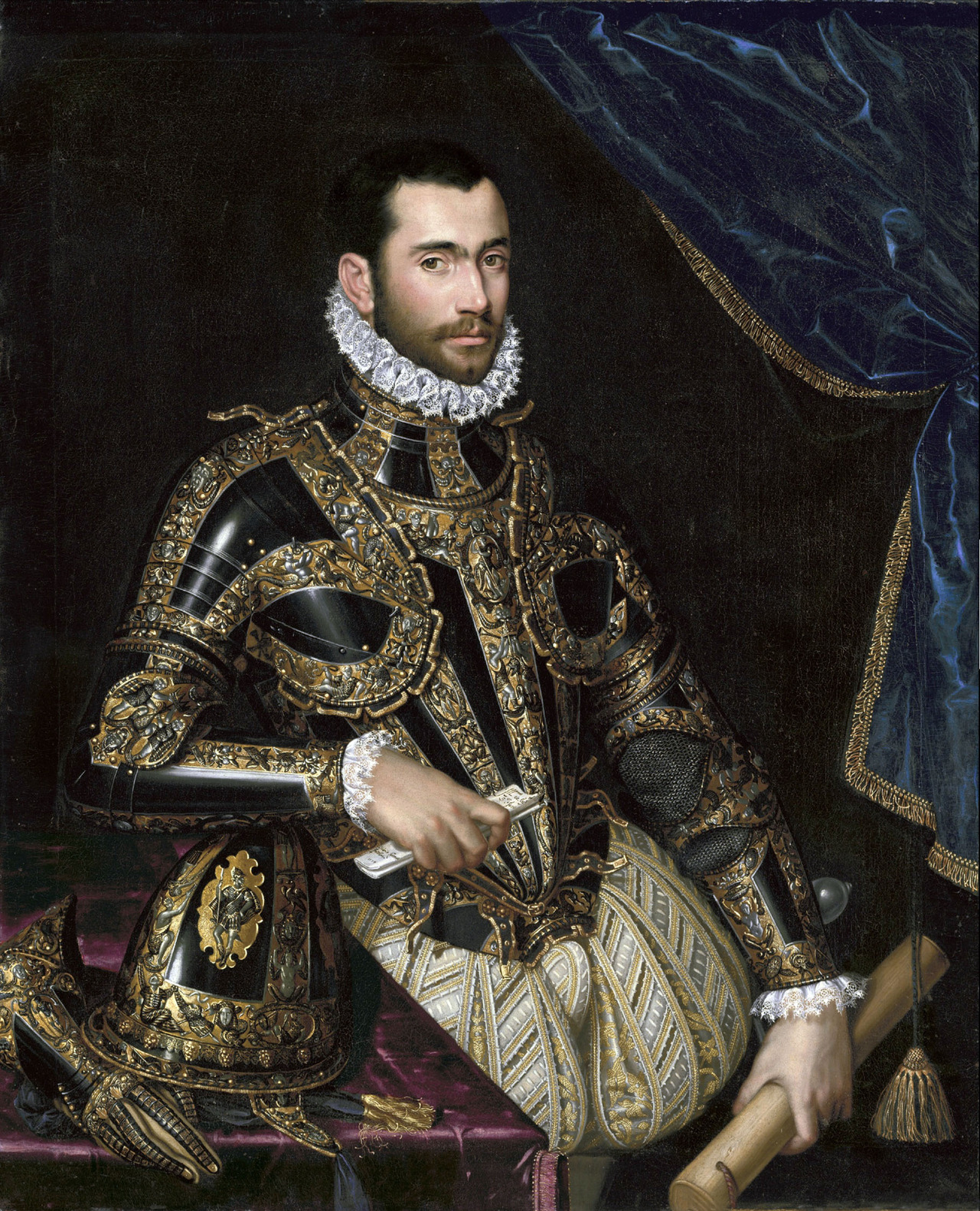
Giacomo Boncompagni, Duke of Sora (1548–1612)

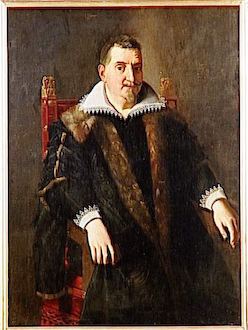
Asdrubale Mattei, Duke of Giove (1556–1638)

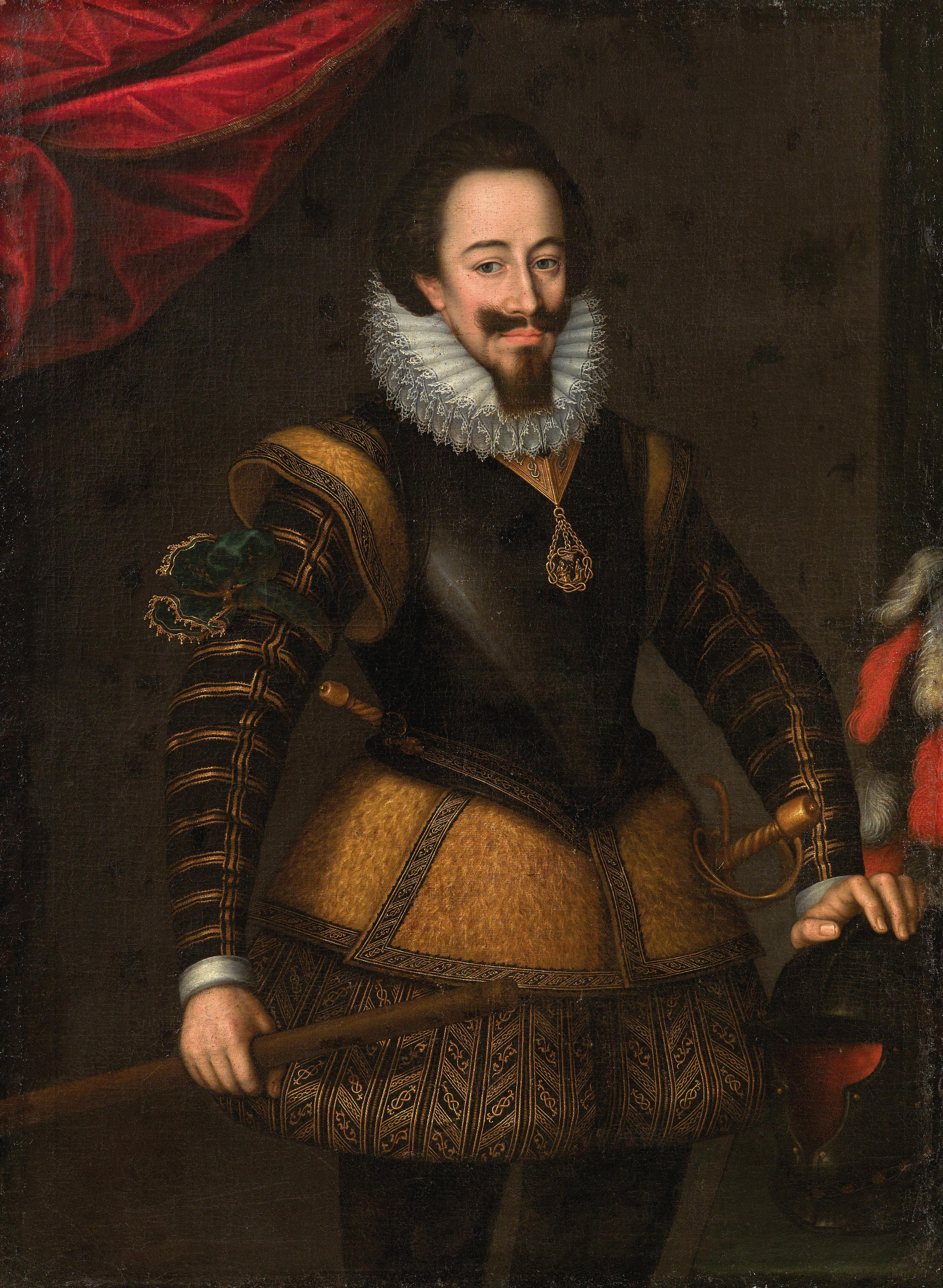
Charles Emmanuel I, Duke of Savoy (1562–1630)

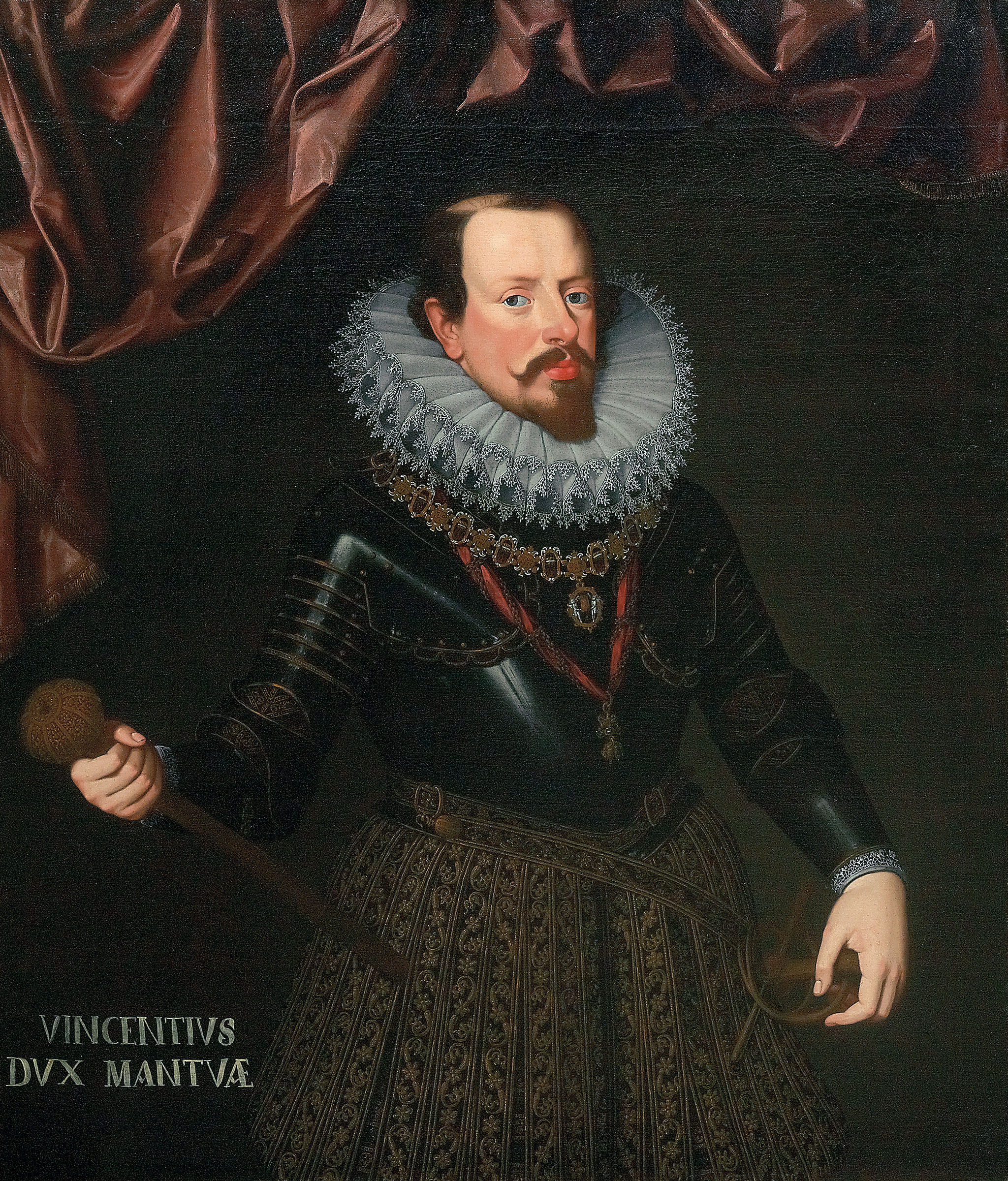
Vincenzo Gonzaga, Duke of Mantua (1562–1612)

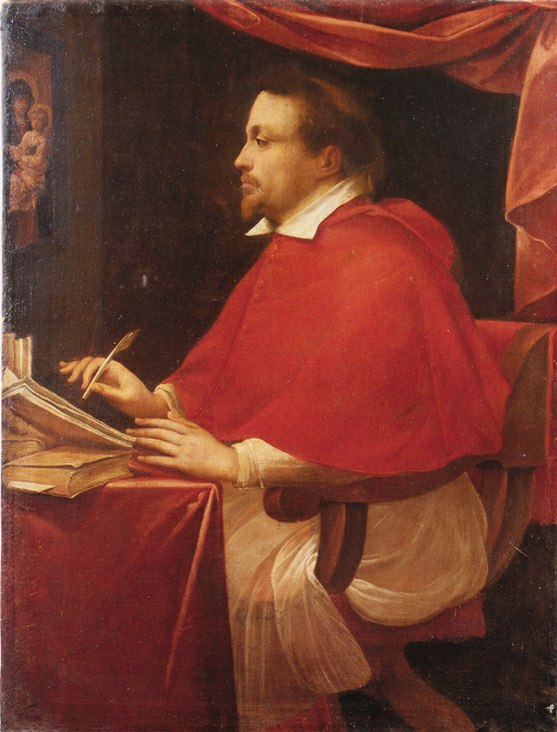
Cardinal Federico Borromeo (1564–1631)

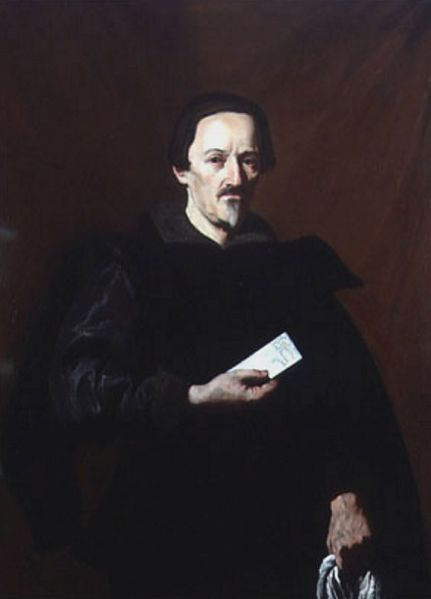
Marchese Vincenzo Giustiniani (1564–1637)

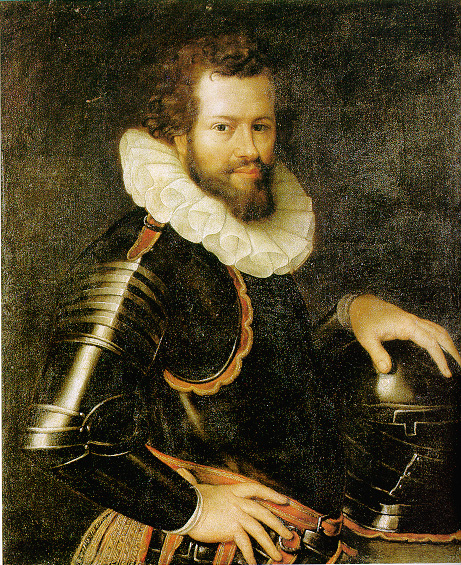
Ranuccio I Farnese, Duke of Parma (1569–1622)

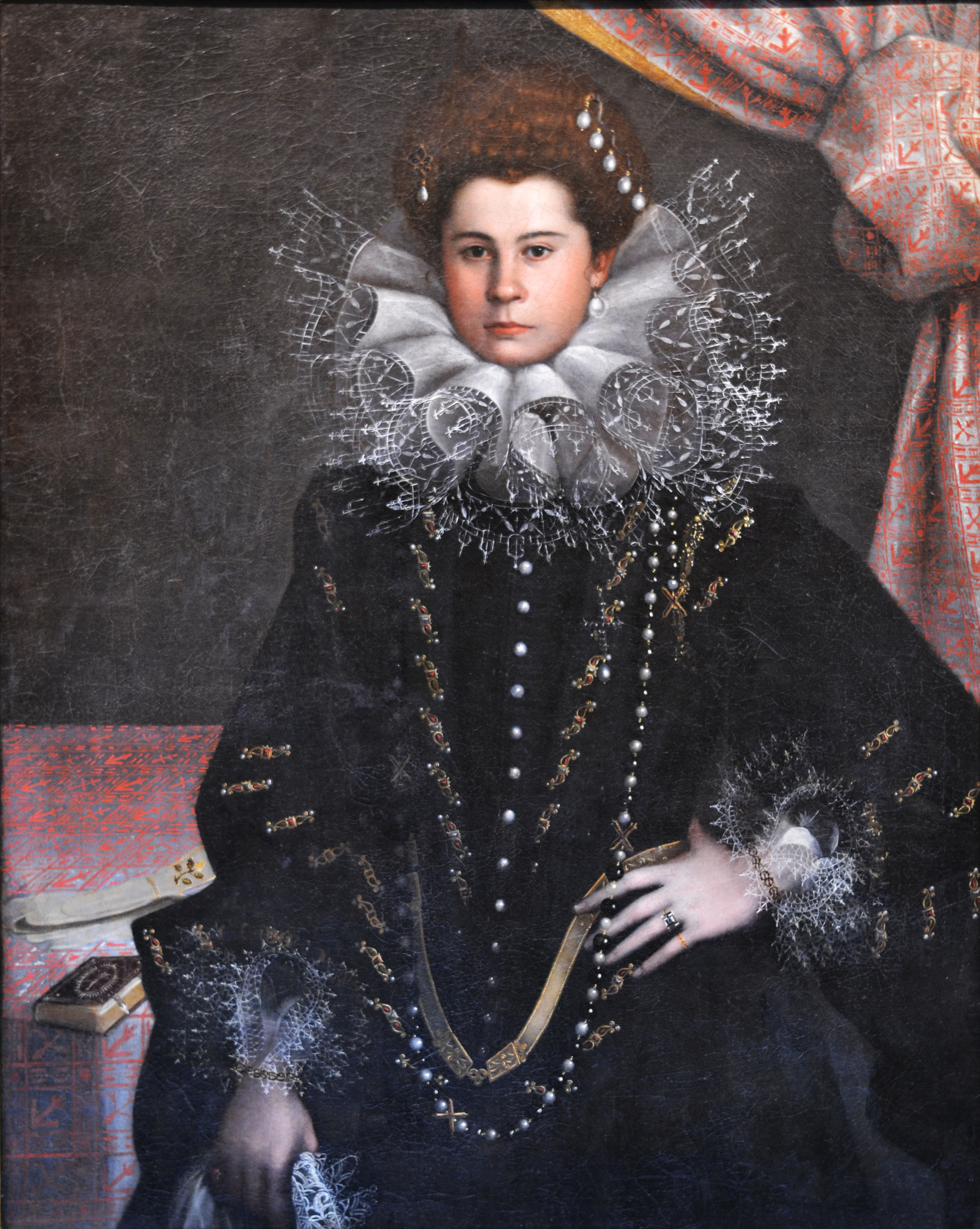
Livia della Rovere, Duchess of Urbino (1585–1641)

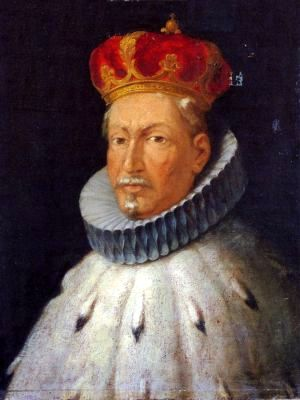
Alessandro Spinola, Doge of Genoa (1589–1665)

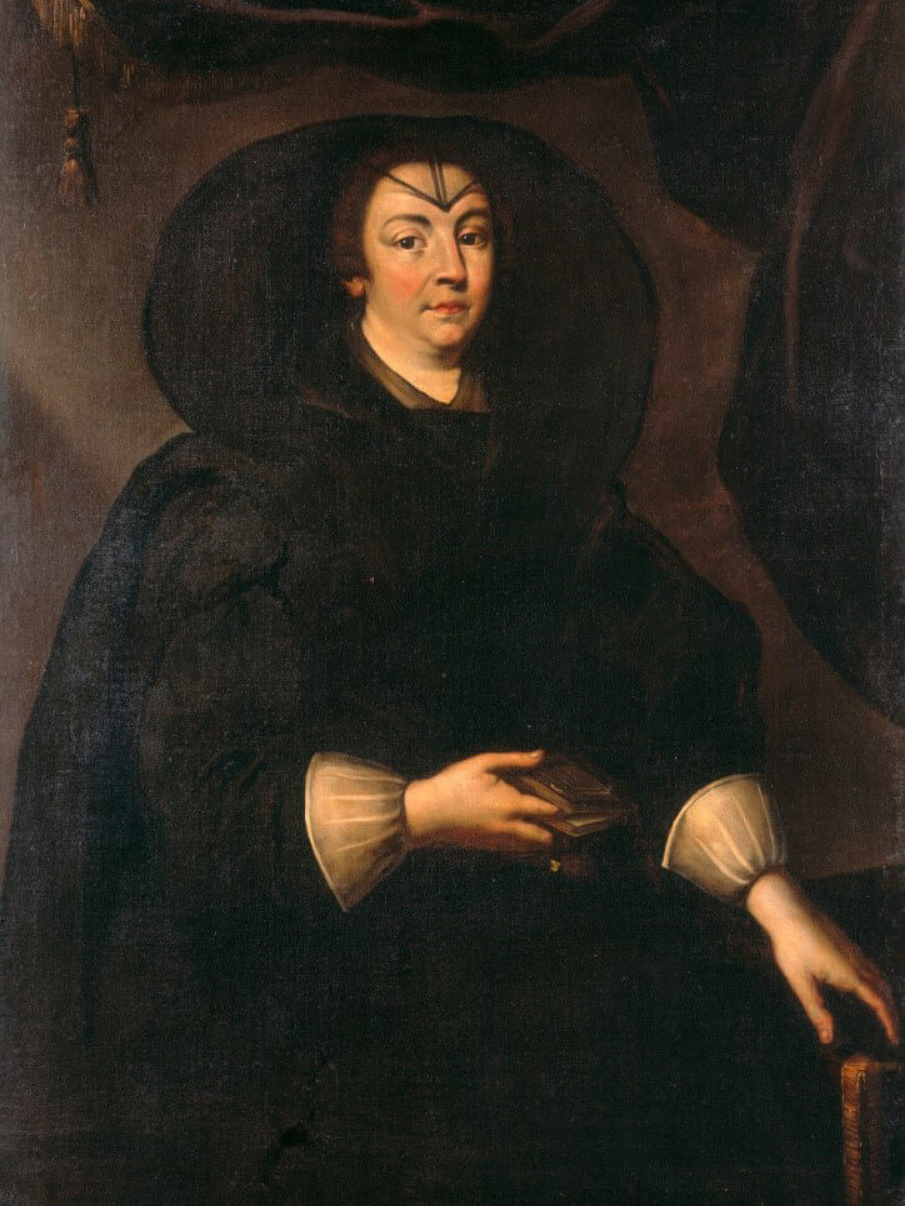
Donna Olimpia Maidalchini (1591–1657)

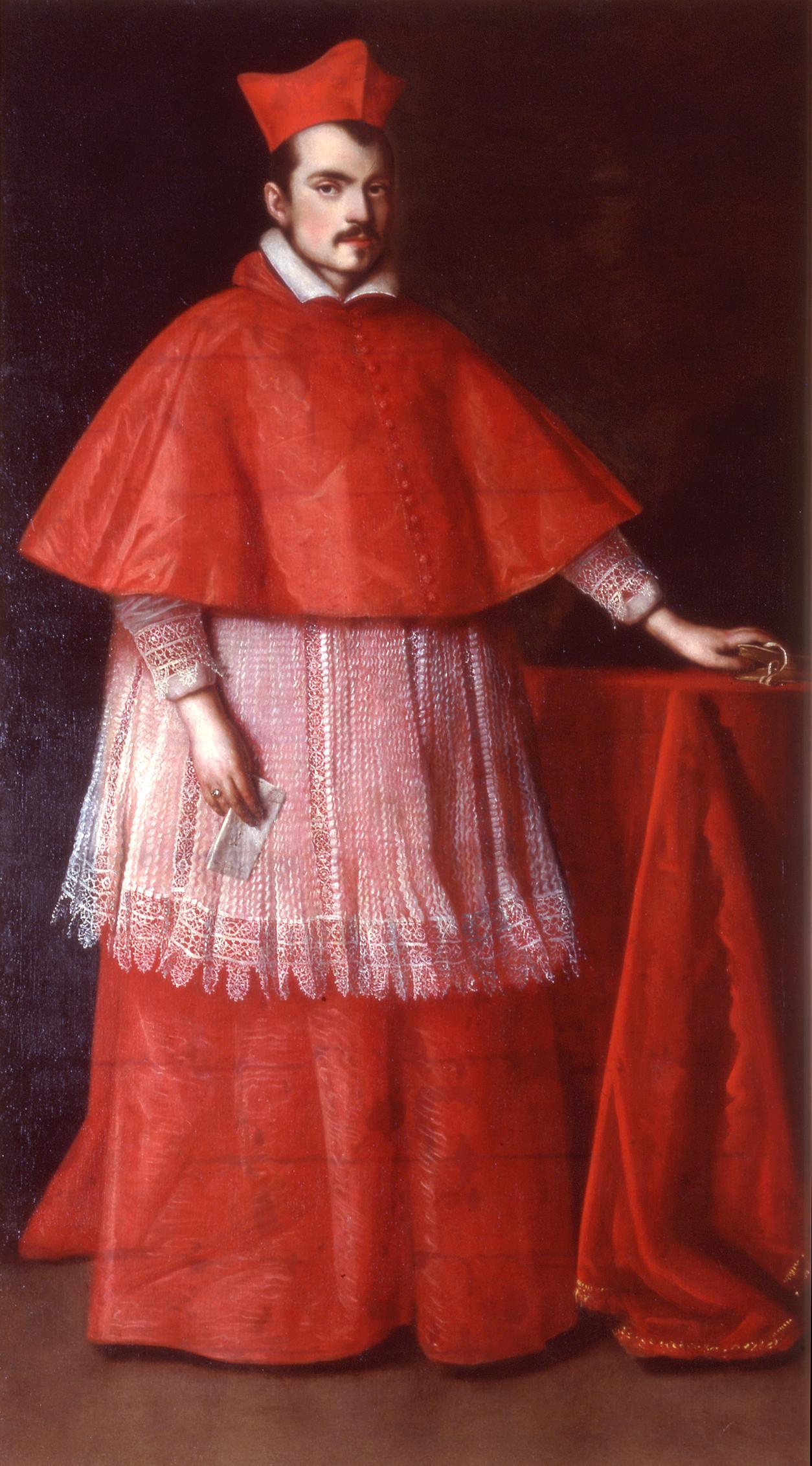
Cardinal Ludovico Ludovisi (1595–1632)

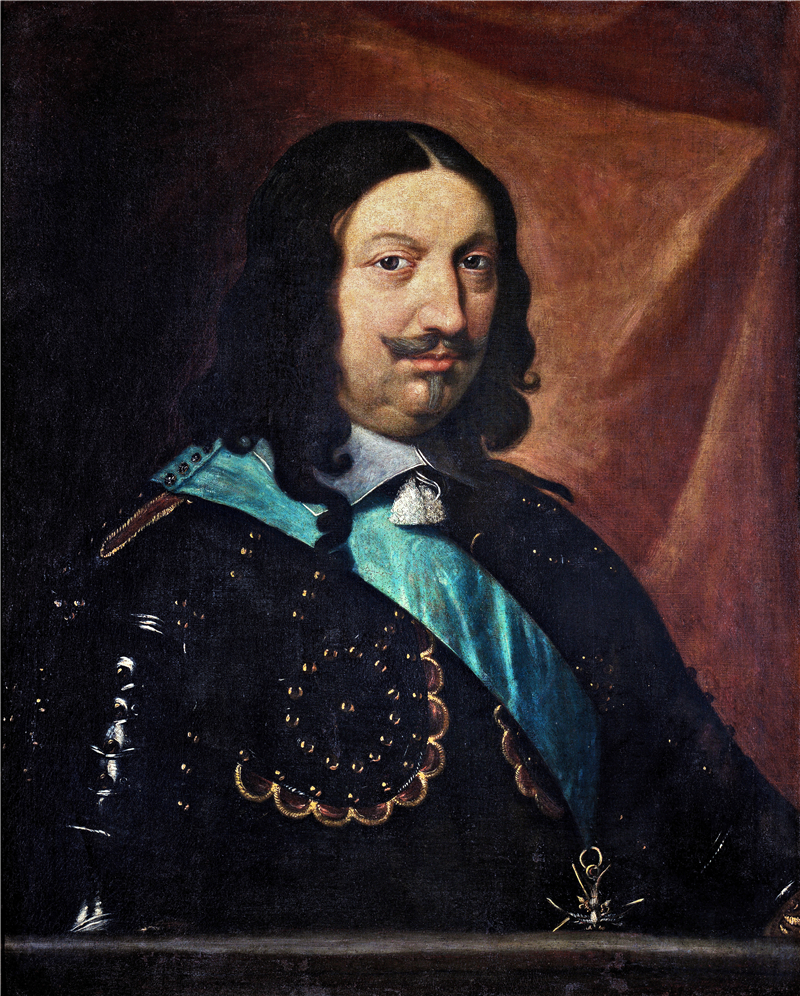
Honoré Grimaldi, Prince of Monaco (1597–1662)

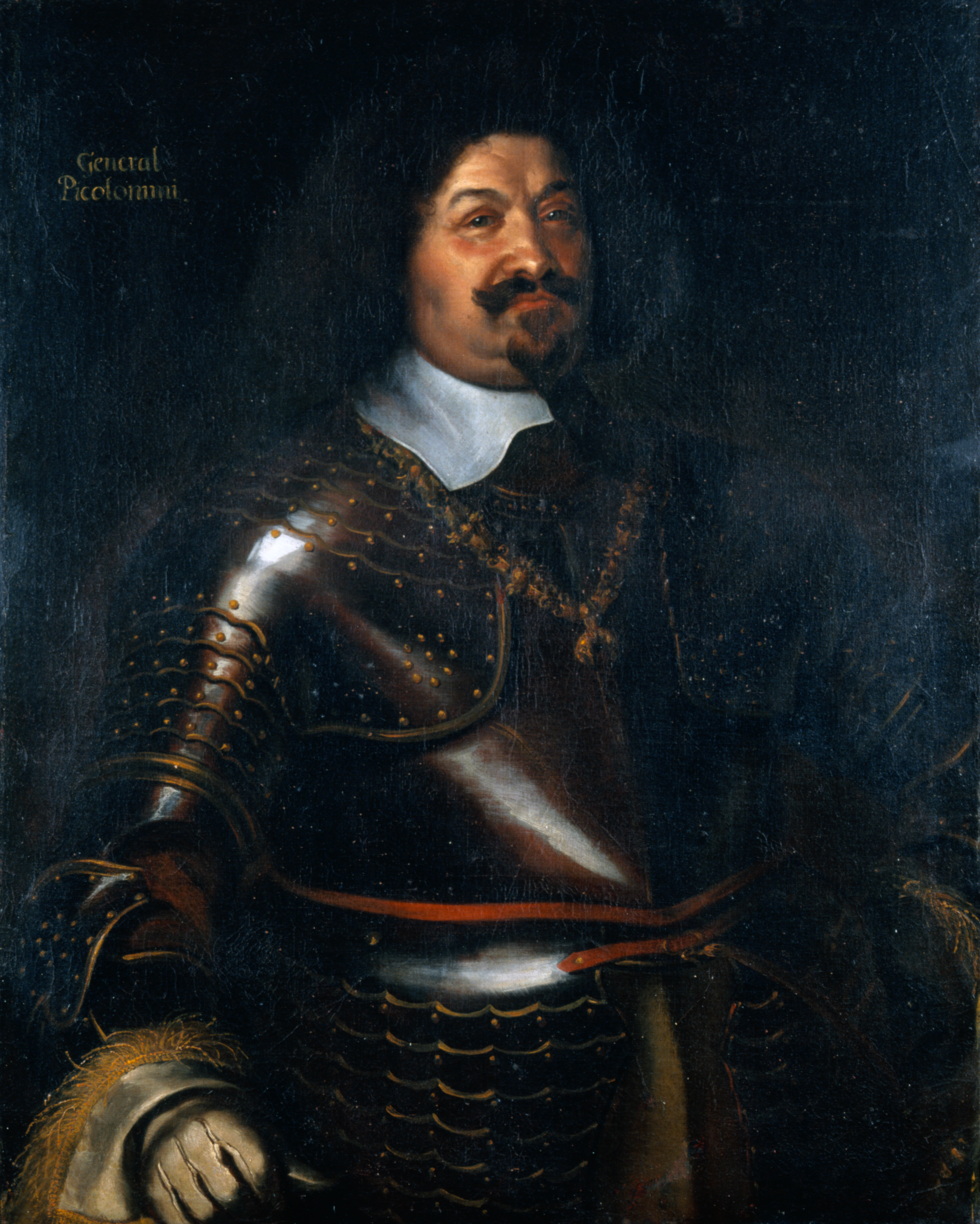
Ottavio Piccolomini, Duke of Amalfi (1599–1656)

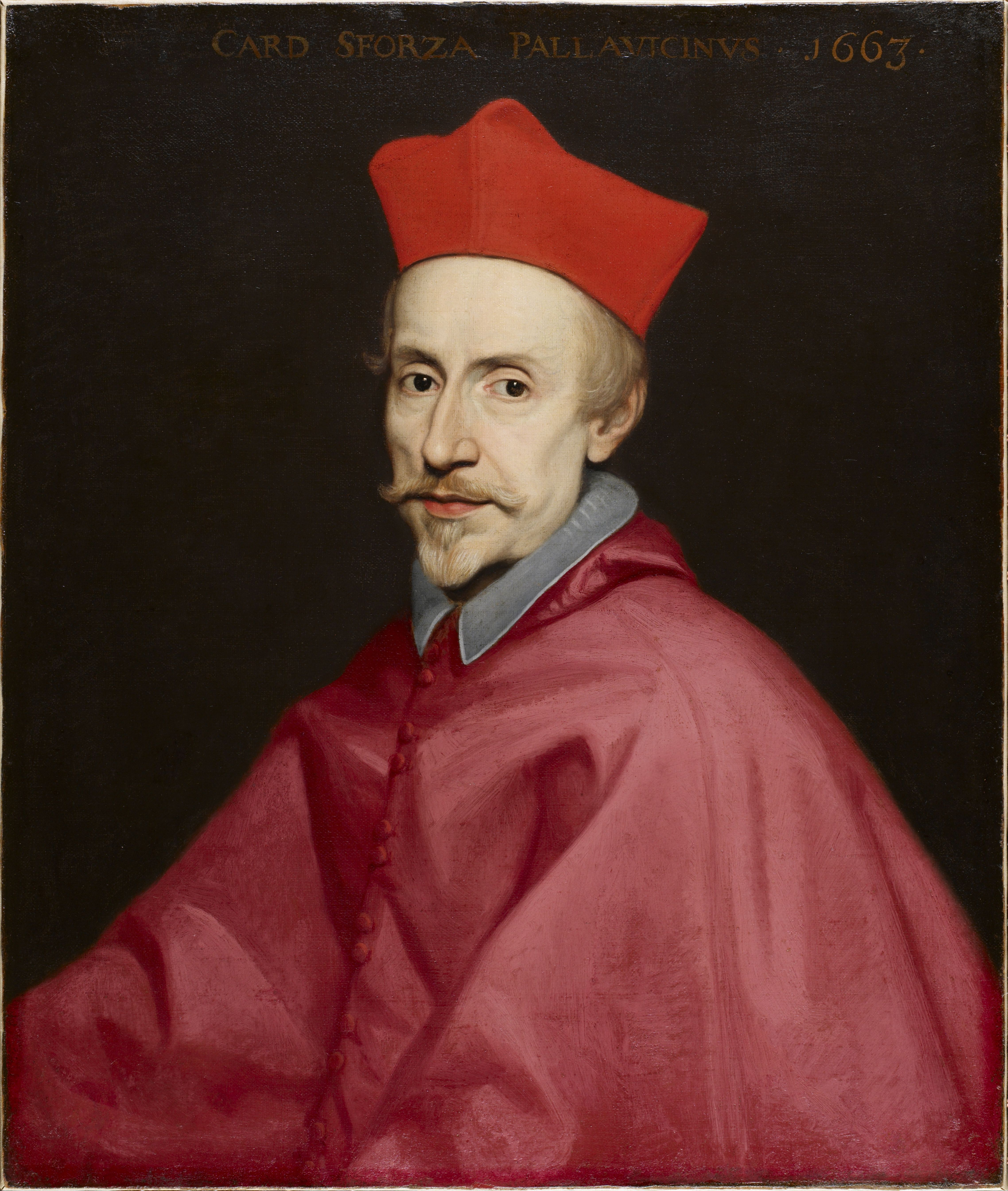
Cardinal Francesco Sforza Pallavicino (1607–1667)

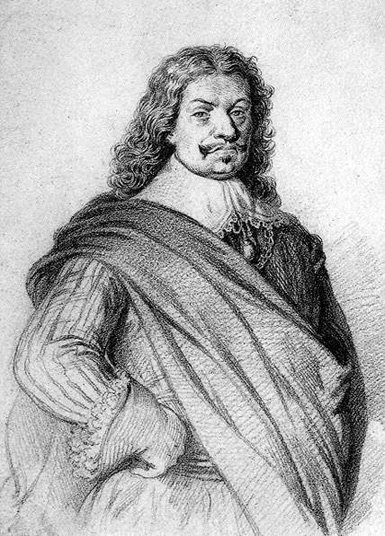
Count Raimondo Montecuccoli (1609–1680)

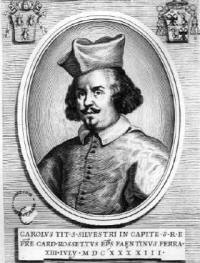
Count Carlo Rossetti, Cardinal (1614–1681)

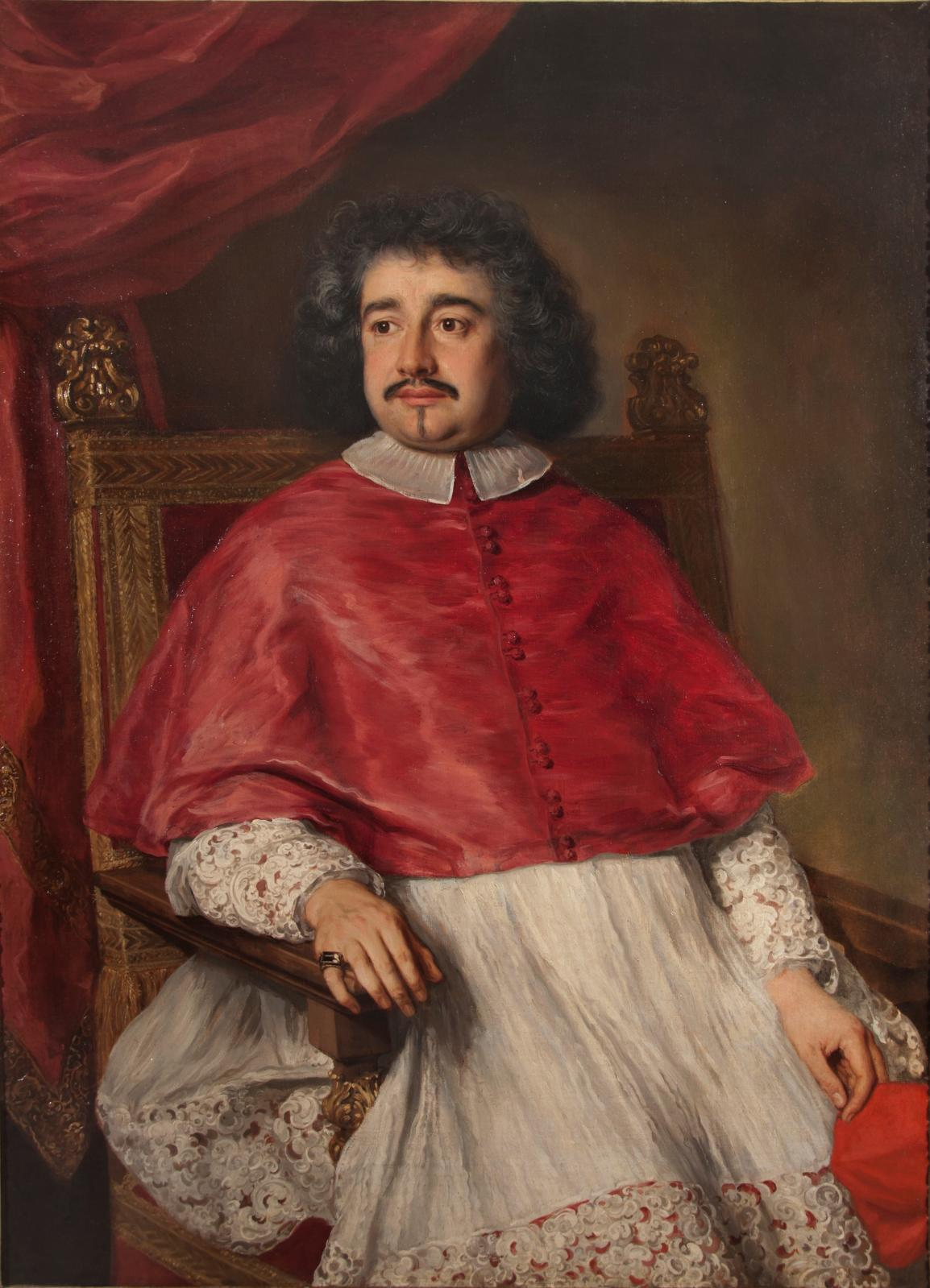
Cardinal Flavio Chigi, Duke of Ariccia (1631–1693)

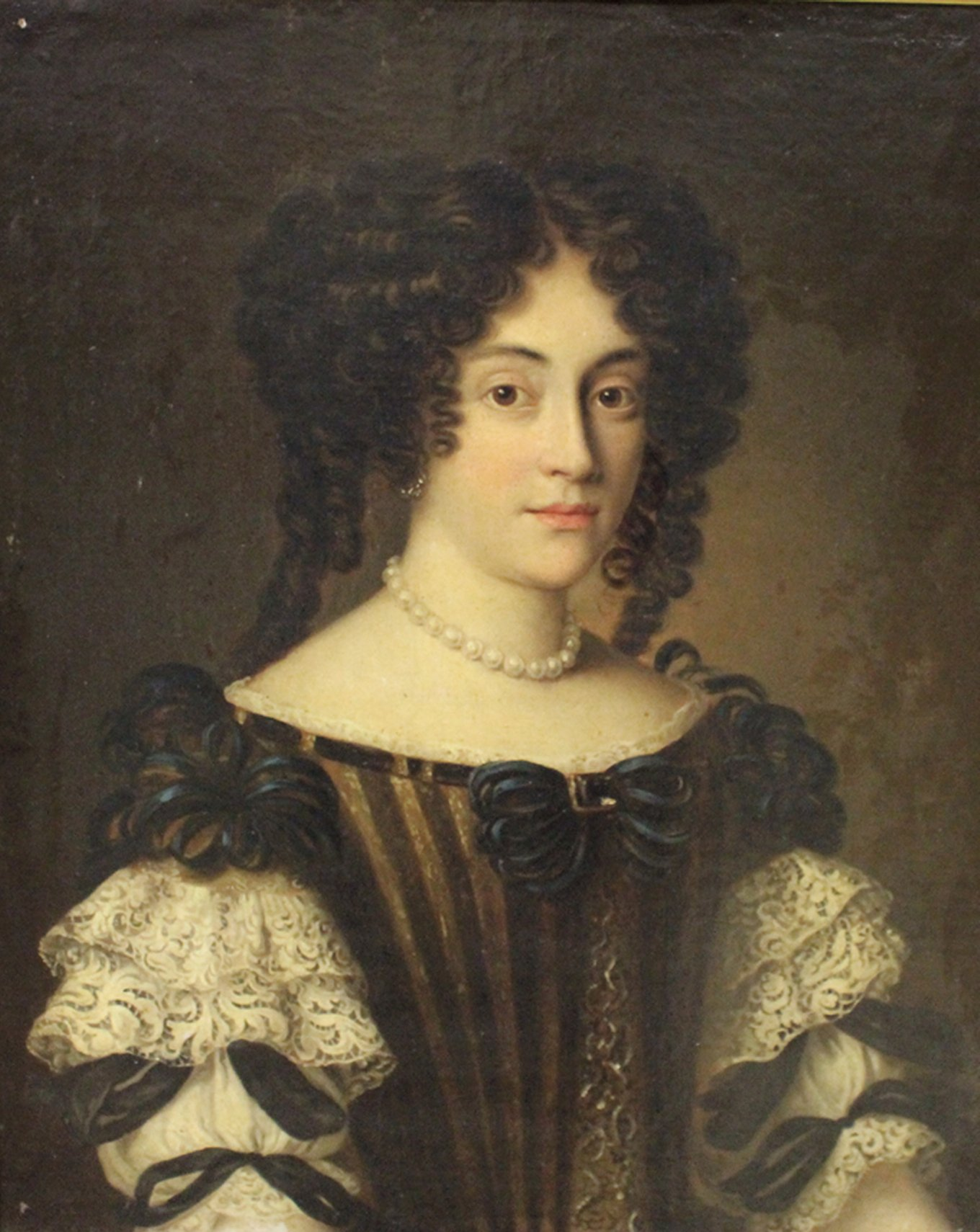
Princess Anna Maria Mancini (1639–1715)

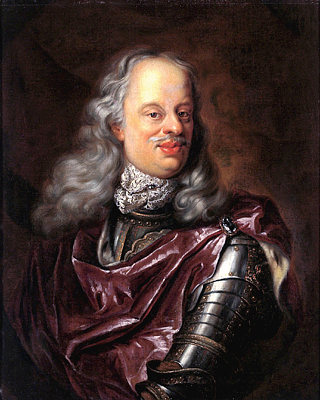
Cosimo III de' Medici, Grand Duke of Tuscany (1642–1723)

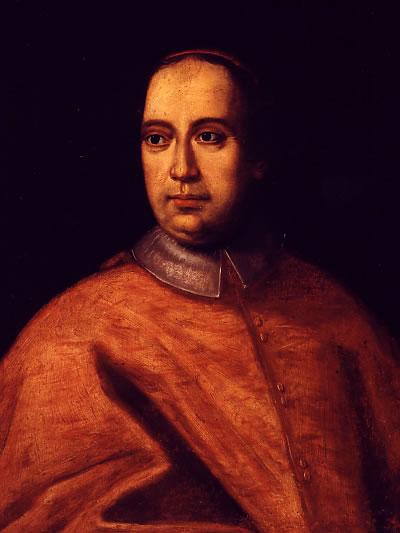
Cardinal Benedetto Pamphili (1653–1730)

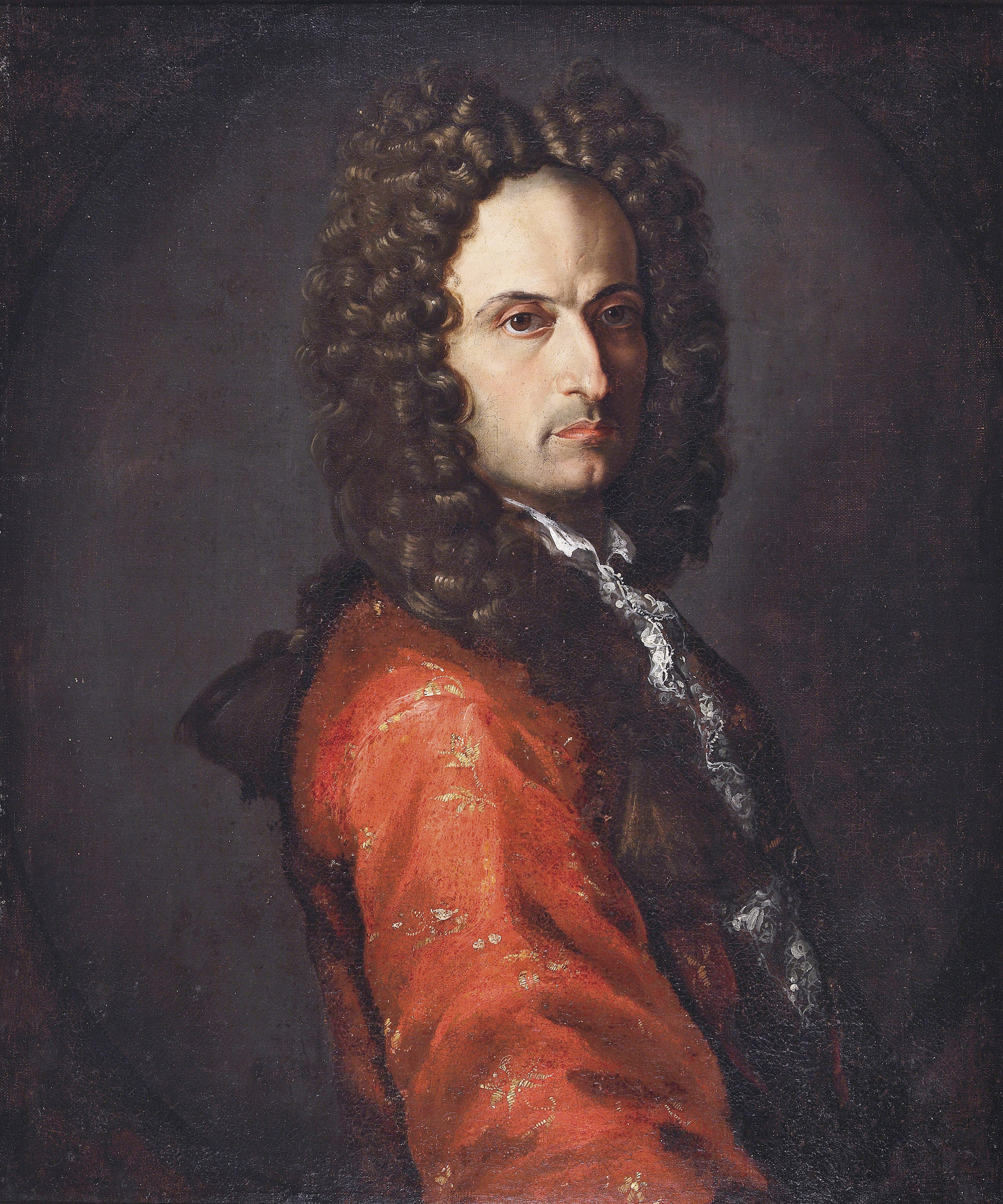
Urbano Barberini, Prince of Palestrina (1664–1722)

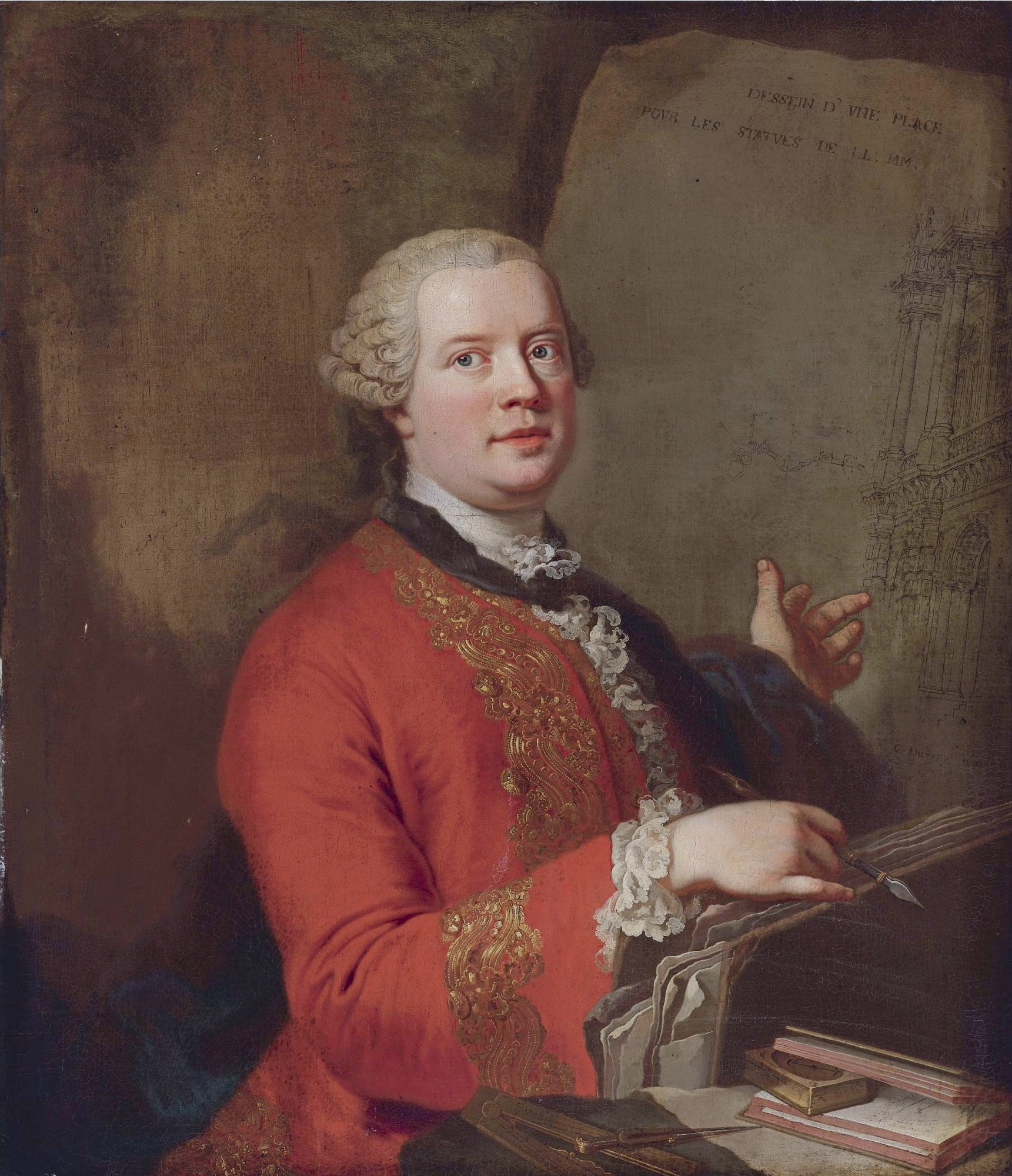
Count Giacomo Durazzo (1717–1794)

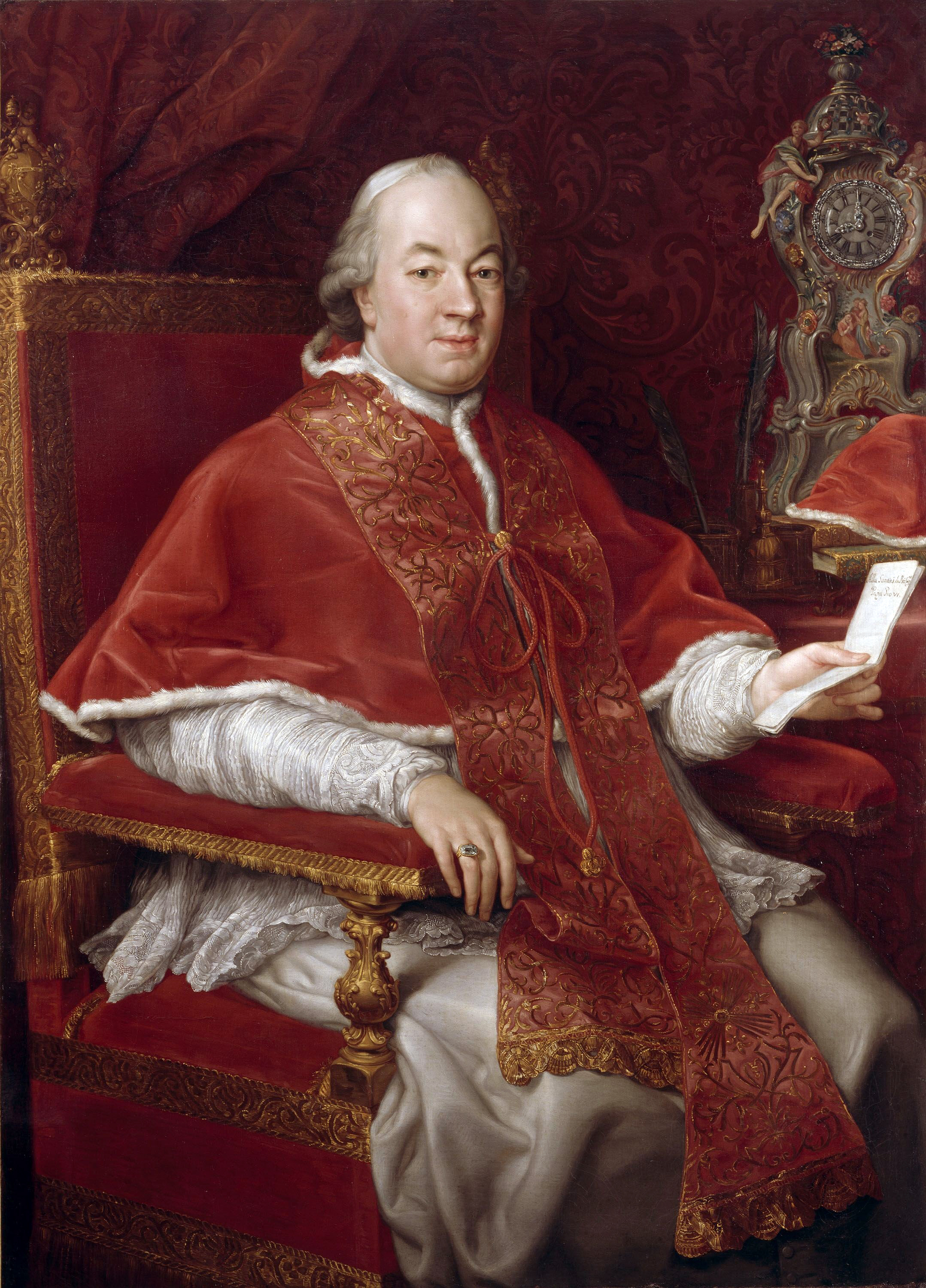
Pope Pius VI (Count Giovanni Angelo Braschi) (1717–1799)

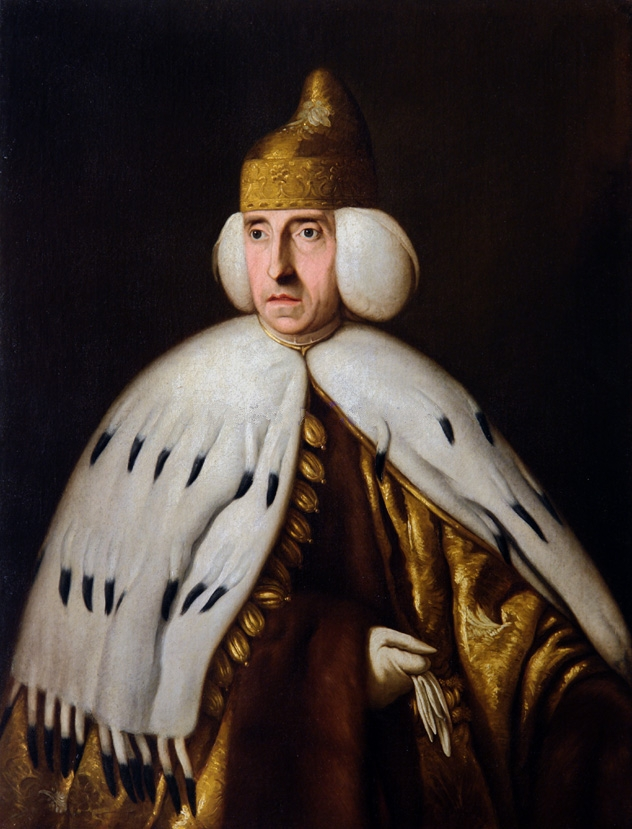
Ludovico Manin, 120th and last Doge of Venice (1725–1802)

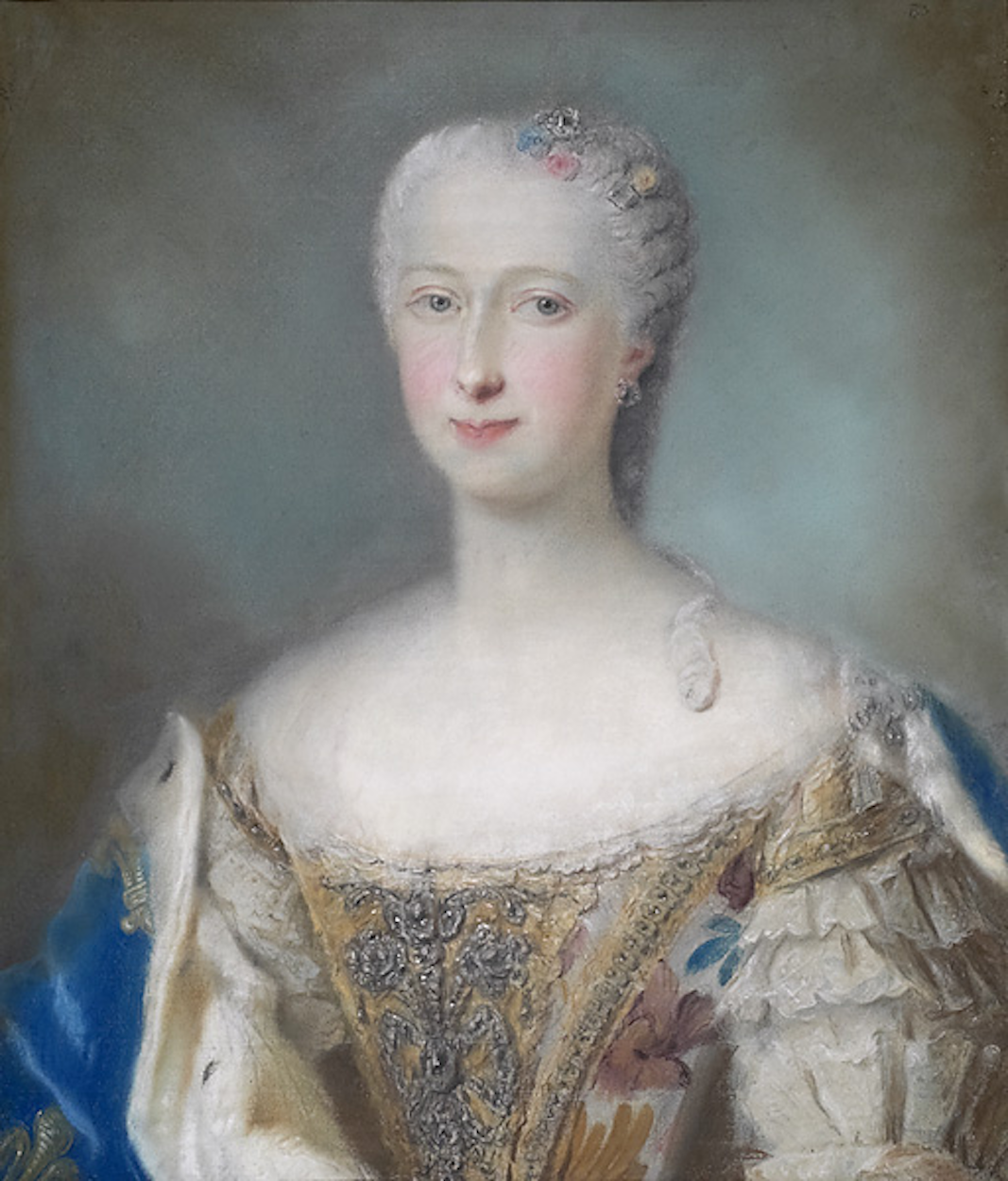
Maria Teresa Felicitas d'Este (1726–1754)

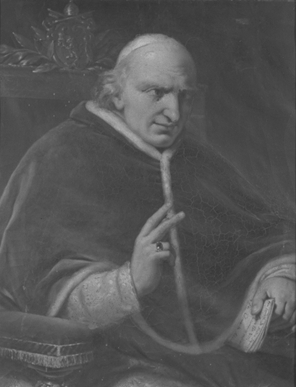
Pope Pius VIII, born Count Francesco Saverio Castiglioni (1761–1830)

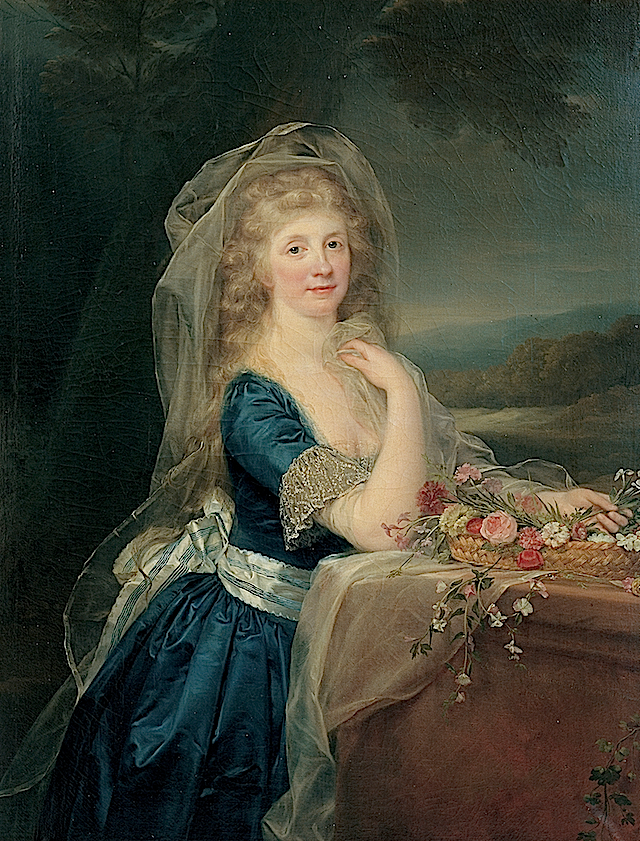
Anna Pieri Brignole Sale (1765–1815)

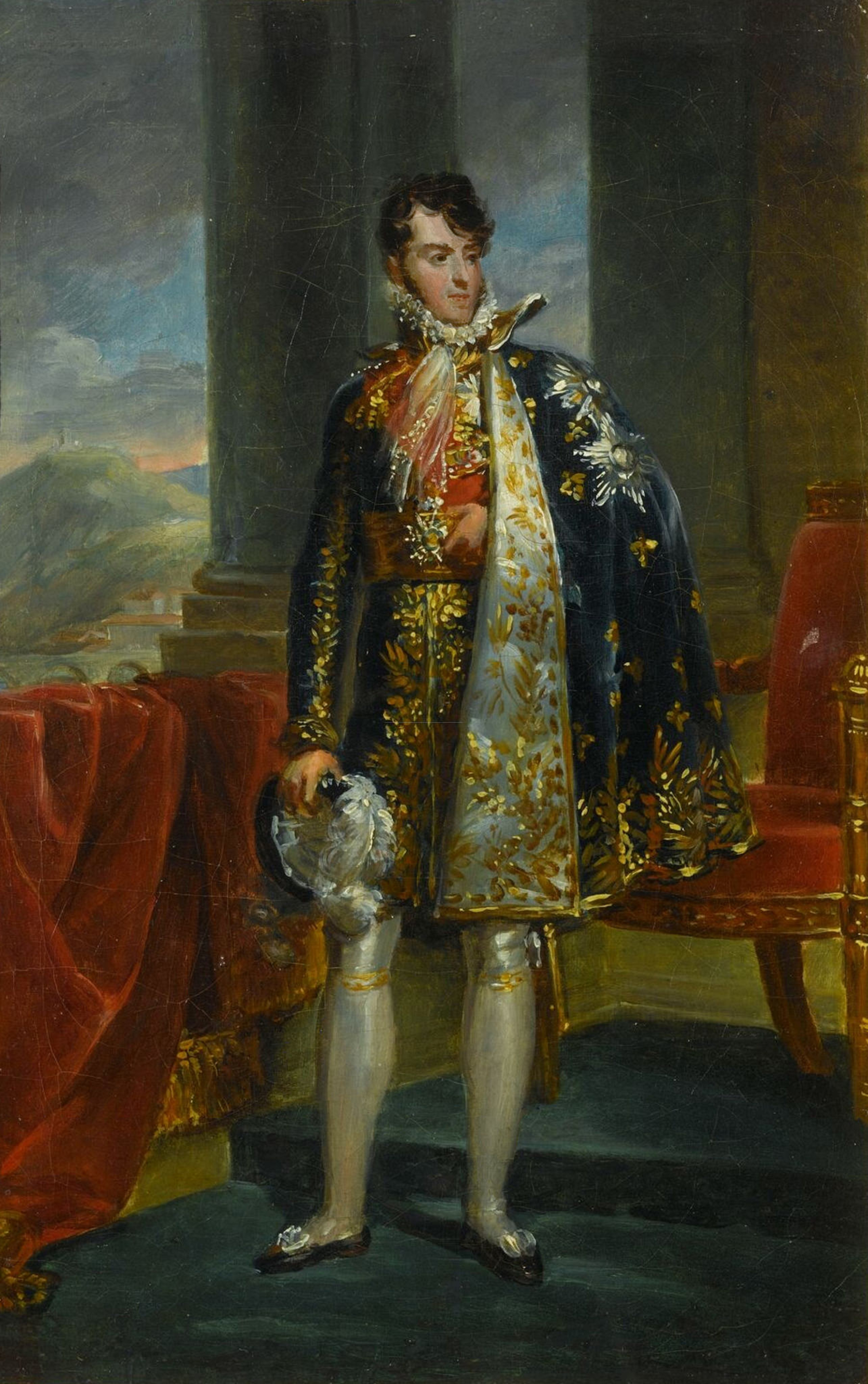
Camillo Borghese, 6th Prince of Sulmona (1775–1832)

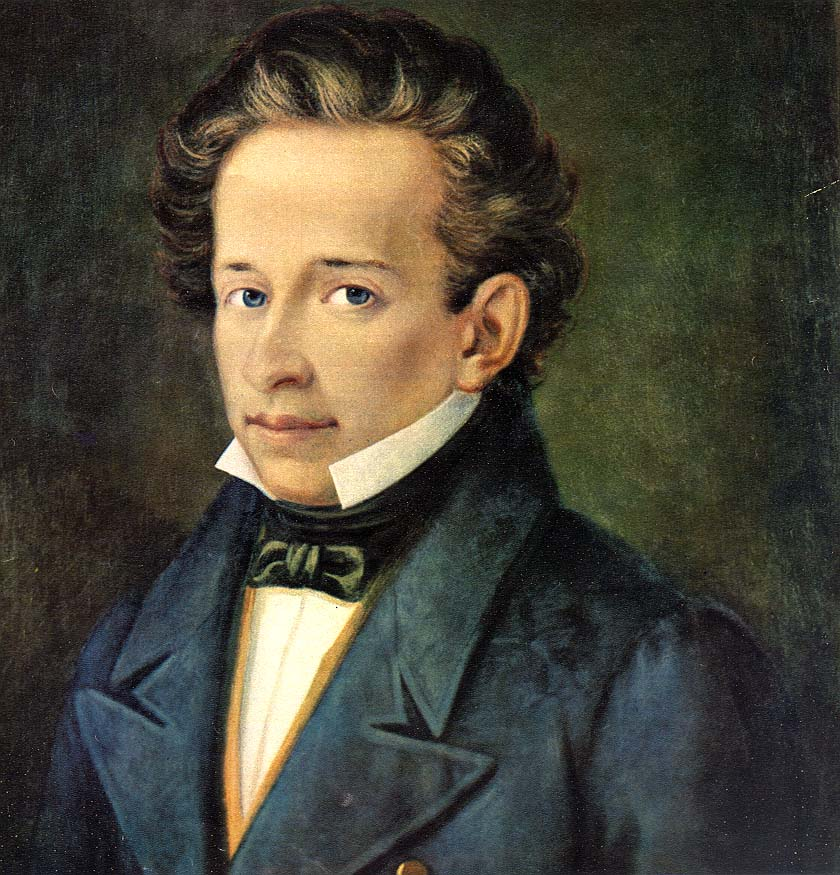
Count Giacomo Leopardi (1798–1837)

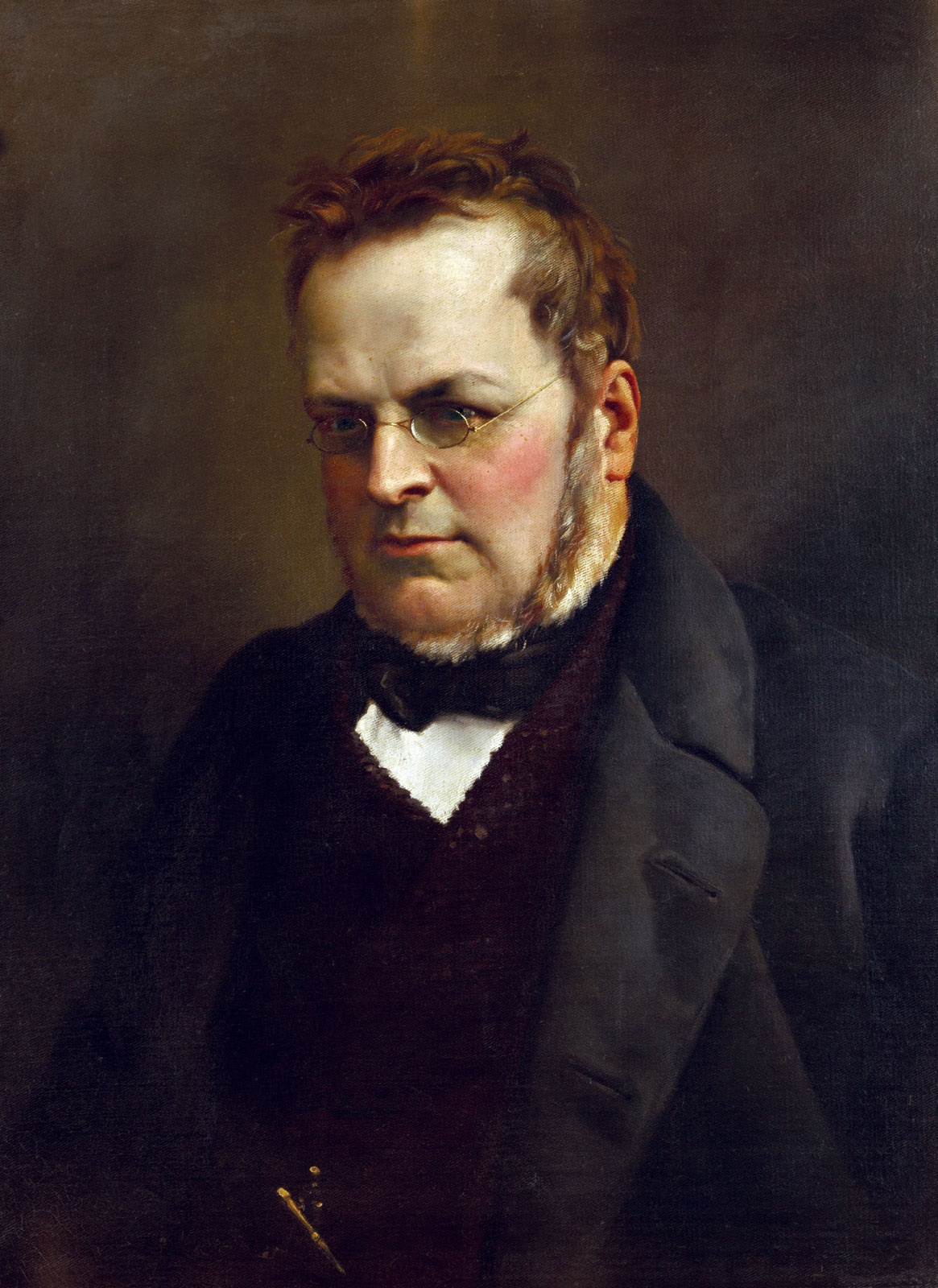
Camillo Benso, Count of Cavour (1810–1861)

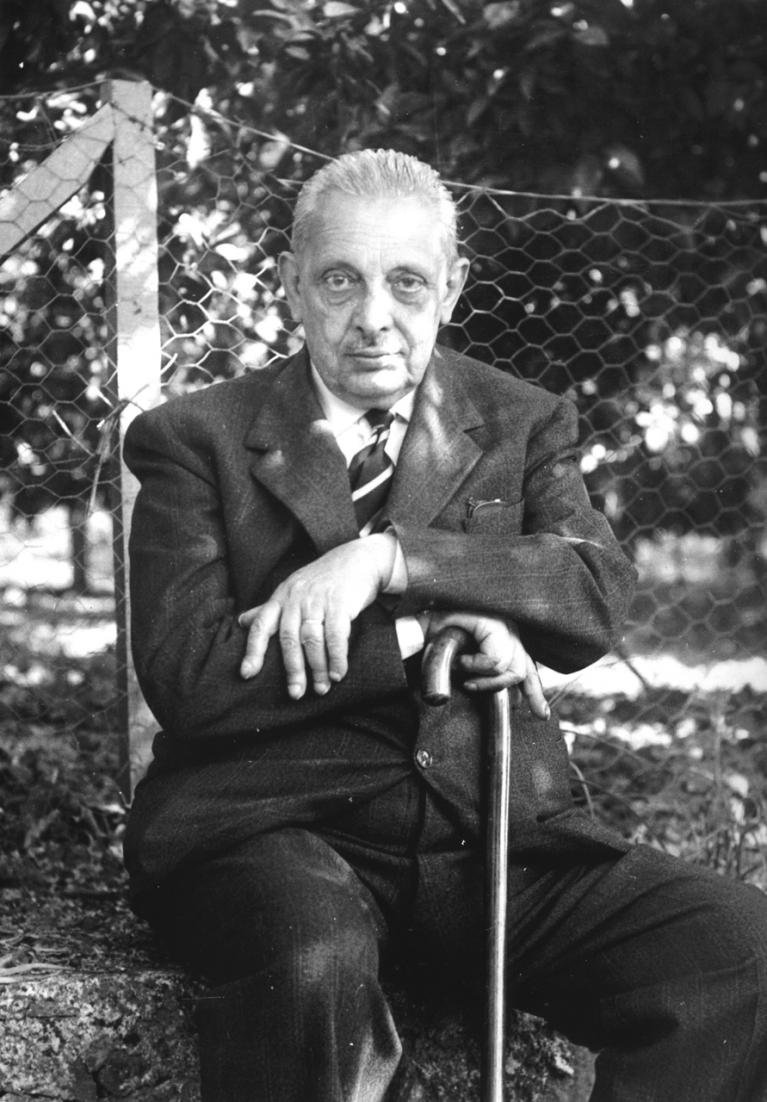
Don Giuseppe Tomasi, 11th Prince of Lampedusa (1896–1957)

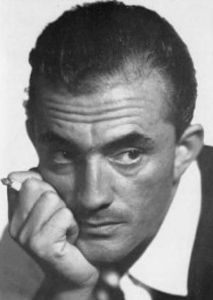
Don Luchino Visconti di Modrone, Count of Lonate Pozzolo (1906–1976)

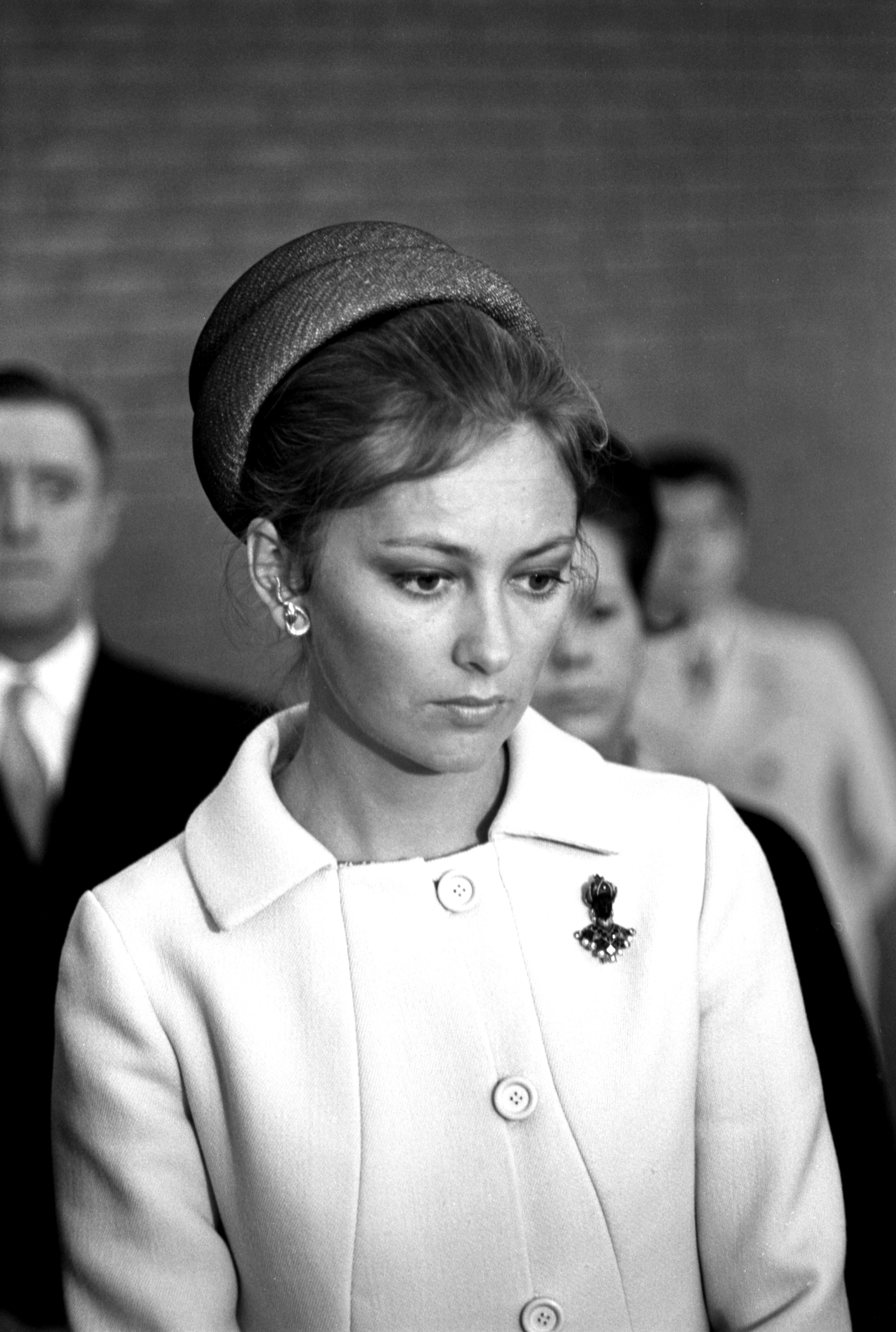
Donna Paola dei Principi Ruffo di Calabria, later Queen consort of the Belgians (born 1937)

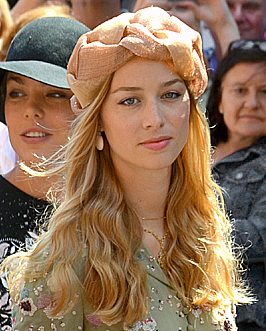
Donna Beatrice dei Principi Borromeo Arese Taverna (born 1985)

== See also ==
- Consulta araldica
- Corpo della Nobiltà Italiana
- Libro d'Oro
- Annuario della Nobiltà Italiana
- List of European Jewish nobility
