= Almanach de Gotha =

Directory of European royalty and higher nobility

- The Almanach de Gotha book, published in 1851
- Country: Saxe-Coburg and Gotha (original); United Kingdom (current)
- Language: French, German (original), English (current)
- Genre: Nobility, heraldry, genealogy
- Publisher: J. C. Dieterich; C. W. Ettinger; C. G. Ettinger; Justus Perthes; Almanach de Gotha
- Published: 1763–1944; 1998–
- Published in English: 1998–
- Media type: Print
- Website: Official website

The Almanach de Gotha (German: Gothaischer Hofkalender, pronounced [ˈɡoːtaɪʃɐ ˈhoːfkaˌlɛndɐ]) is a directory of Europe's royalty and higher nobility, also including the major governmental, military and diplomatic corps, as well as statistical data by country. First published in 1763 by Carl Wilhelm Ettinger in Gotha in Thuringia, Germany at the ducal court of Frederick III, Duke of Saxe-Gotha-Altenburg, it came to be regarded as an authority in the classification of monarchies and their courts, reigning and former dynasties, princely and ducal families, and the genealogical, biographical and titulary details of Europe's highest level of aristocracy. It was published annually from 1785 until 1944 by Justus Perthes Publishing House in Gotha.

In 1992, the family of Justus Perthes re-established its right to use the name Almanach de Gotha. In 1998, a London-based publisher, John Kennedy, acquired the rights for use of the title of Almanach de Gotha from Justus Perthes Verlag Gotha GmbH, then a fully owned subsidiary of Ernst Klett Schulbuchverlag GmbH, Stuttgart. The last edition produced by Justus Perthes was the 181st, produced in 1944. After a gap of 54 years the first of the new editions (the 182nd) was published in 1998 with English, the new diplomatic language, used as the lingua franca in the place of French or German. Perthes regards the resultant volumes as new works, and not as a continuation of the editions which Perthes had published from 1785 to 1944. Two volumes have been printed since 1998, with Volume I containing lists of the sovereign, formerly sovereign and mediatised houses of Europe, and a diplomatic and statistical directory; and Volume II containing lists of the non-sovereign princely and ducal houses of Europe.

== Gotha publication (1763–1944) ==
The original Almanach de Gotha provided detailed facts and statistics on nations of the world, including their reigning and formerly reigning houses, those of Europe being more complete than those of other continents. It also named the highest incumbent officers of state, members of the diplomatic corps, and Europe's upper nobility with their families. At its most extensive the Almanach had more than 1200 pages, fewer than half of which were dedicated to monarchical or aristocratic data. It acquired a reputation for the breadth and precision of its information on royalty and nobility compared to other almanacs.

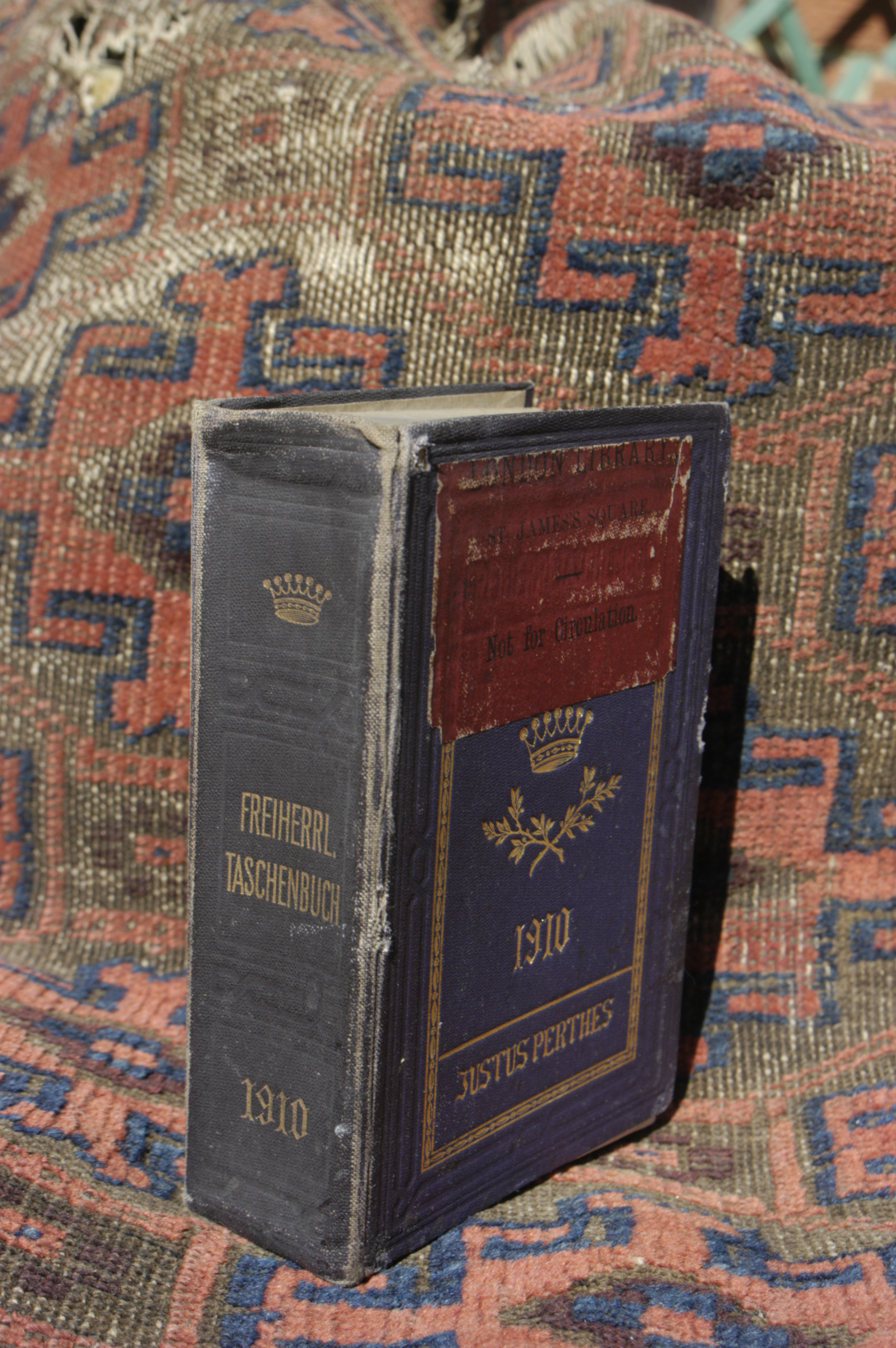
London Library's copy of Gothaisches Genealogisches Taschenbuch der Freiherrlichen Häuser, 1910.

The Almanach's publication by Justus Perthes began at the ducal court of Saxe-Coburg and Gotha in Germany. The almanac listed the reigning dynasty of that court first well into the 19th century, usually followed by kindred sovereigns of the House of Wettin and then, in alphabetical order, other families of princely rank, reigning and non-reigning. Although always published in French, other almanacs in French and English were more widely sold internationally. The almanac's structure changed and its scope expanded over the years. The second portion, called the Annuaire diplomatique et statistique ("Diplomatic and Statistical Yearbook"), provided demographic and governmental information by nation, similar to other almanacs. Its first portion, called the Annuaire généalogique ("Genealogical Yearbook"), came to consist essentially of three sections: reigning and formerly reigning families, mediatized families and non-sovereign families at least one of whose members bore the title of prince or duke.

The first section always listed Europe's sovereign houses, whether they reigned as emperor, king, grand duke, duke, prince, or some other title such as prince elector, margrave, landgrave, count palatine or pope. Until 1810 these sovereign houses were listed alongside such families and entities as Barbiano-Belgiojoso, Clary-Aldringen, Colloredo-Mansfeld, Fürstenberg, the Emperor, Genoa, Gonzaga, Hatzfeldt, Jablonowski, Kinsky, Ligne, Paar, Radziwill, Starhemberg, Thurn and Taxis, Turkey, Venice, the Order of Malta and the Teutonic Knights. In 1812, these entries began to be listed in groups: first were German sovereigns who held the rank of grand duke or prince elector and above (the Duke of Saxe-Gotha was, however, listed here along with, but before, France—see below).

Listed next were Germany's reigning ducal and princely dynasties under the heading "College of Princes", e.g. Hohenzollern, Isenburg, Leyen, Liechtenstein and the other Saxon duchies. They were followed by heads of non-German monarchies, such as Austria, Brazil, and Great Britain. Fourth were listed non-reigning dukes and princes, whether mediatized or not, including La Rochefoucauld (including Dominique and his son Gabriel), Arenberg, Croy, Fürstenberg alongside Batthyany, Jablonowski, Sulkowski, Porcia and Benevento.

In 1841 a third section was added to those of the sovereign dynasties and the non-reigning princely and ducal families. It was composed exclusively of the mediatised houses of comital rank recognized by the various states of the German Confederation as belonging, since 1825, to the same historical category and sharing some of the same privileges as reigning dynasties because they previously held the rank of ruling Princes of the Holy Roman Empire; these families were German with a few exceptions (e.g. Bentinck, Rechteren-Limpurg). The 1815 treaty of the Congress of Vienna had authorized – and Article 14 of the German Confederation's Bundesakt (charter) recognized – retention from the German Imperial regime of equality of birth for marital purposes of mediatized families (called Standesherren) to reigning dynasties. In 1877, the mediatized comital families were moved from section III to section II A, where they joined the princely mediatized families.

In the third section were members of such non-reigning but historically notable princely or ducal families such as Rohan, Orsini, Ursel, Norfolk, Czartoryski, Galitzine, La Rochefoucauld, Kinsky, Radziwill, Merode, Dohna and Alba.

Other deposed European dynasties (e.g. Arenberg, Biron, Dadiani, Boncompagni-Ludovisi, Giray, Murat) did not benefit from a similar interpretation of their historical status in the almanac. Many princely or ducal families were listed only in its third, non-dynastic section or were excluded altogether, evoking criticism in the 20th century from such genealogists as Jean-Engelbert, Duke d'Arenberg, William Addams Reitwiesner and Cyril Toumanoff the latter commenting that the changes displayed "pan-German triumphalism"

Even in the early 19th century there were objections to the almanac's retention of deposed dynasties, although not necessarily the desired changes. The elected Emperor Napoleon protested in writing to his foreign minister, Champagny:

"Monsieur de Champagny, this year's "Almanach de Gotha" is badly done. First comes the Comte de Lille [title used in exile by the future King Louis XVIII], followed by all the princes of the Confederation as if no change has been made in the constitution of Germany; the family of France is named inappropriately therein. Summon the Minister of Gotha, who is to be made to understand that in the next Almanach all of this is to be changed. The House of France must be referred to as in the [French] Imperial Almanac; there must be no further mention of the Comte de Lille, nor of any German prince other than those retained by the Articles of Confederation of the Rhine. You are to insist that the article be transmitted to you prior to publication. If other almanacs are printed in my allies' realms with inappropriate references to the Bourbons and the House of France, instruct my ministers to make it known that you have taken note, and that this is to be changed by next year."

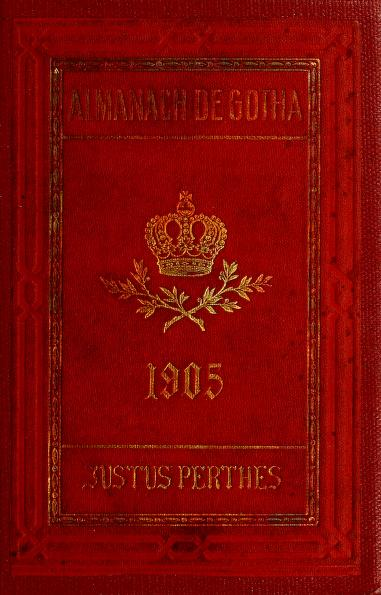
Almanach de Gotha, published by Justus Perthes (1905)

The response of the publishers was to humour Napoleon by producing two editions: one for France, with the recently ennobled, and another which included dynasties deposed since abolition of the Holy Roman Empire. A merged version, whose first section (Princely houses) included recently reigning dynasties but also the titulature of families that lost sovereignty after the fall of Napoleon in 1815, remained in publication as Gothaischer Hofkalender (Gothaic court calendar). The almanac was published in a German and a French edition as Gothaischer Hofkalender and Almanach de Gotha.

In 1887 the Almanach began to include non-European dynasties in its first section, with the inclusion of one of the ruling families of India. Since 1824, the Princely houses, i.e. ruling and princely families listed in the court calendar, have been divided into three groups: (1) current sovereigns and their houses, (2) other princely and ducal houses in Germany, France and Italy and (3) mediatized German houses characterized by equality with the ruling houses. After the founding of the new German Empire, from 1877 the mediatized German princes and counts, i.e. the formerly ruling houses of the Holy Roman Empire, were grouped together as section II in order to emphasize their significance in the Old Empire as well as their right of equality with the ruling houses in the German Confederation and the New Empire, while the (never ruling) German and foreign titular princes have been moved to section III.

The court calendar was later expanded to include the four series of volumes for the German and Austrian comital houses (i.e., counts' families, since 1825), the baronial houses (since 1848), the untitled Uradel houses (since 1900) and the untitled Briefadel houses (since 1907). The series continued until 1944, but in 1939 its title Gotha court calendar was changed to Gothaisches genealogisches Taschenbuch ("Gothan Genealogical Pocket Book"). This format has since been widely replicated in dynastic compilations (e.g., Genealogisches Handbuch des Adels, Fürstliche Häuser, Burke's Royal Families of the World, Le Petit Gotha, Ruvigny's "Titled Nobility of Europe").

=== World War II and aftermath ===
After Soviet troops entered Gotha in 1945, the city became part of Communist East Germany and the publisher ceased operations.

== Recent German publications ==
From 1951 to 2013, a different publisher, C.A. Starke of Limburg, West Germany, published a multi-volume German-language publication entitled the Genealogisches Handbuch des Adels (GHdA) - (Genealogical Handbook of Nobility). Like its Gotha predecessor it was divided into subsets (Princely Houses, Comital Houses, Baronial Houses, Noble Houses); the Fürstliche Häuser (Princely Houses) subset is largely equivalent to the German language Gothaischer Hofkalender and its Fürstliche Häuser volume which was published by Perthes, or sections 1, 2 and 3 of the Almanach de Gotha. The book series produced several volumes of all sections each year, often containing new, first-time post-war entries, with the respective families being updated about once every 10 to 20 years. In 2013 the publisher Starke Verlag ceased to continue to publish new books in this series after a contract termination by the author.

Instead the Gothaisches Genealogisches Handbuch (GGH) − (Gothaic Genealogical Handbook) continues the annual publication of the substantially same content as GHdA since 2015. Its subset Fürstliche Häuser (Princely Houses, the red volumes) continues with the publication of the genealogies of the European royal, princely and ducal houses, divided into the three sections as previously with Gotha and GHdA, but focuses on their current family members and refers to older volumes of the latter publications with regard to generations that are longer in the past. The publisher and editor of the new GGH publication is the Verlag des Deutschen Adelsarchivs (publishing company of the German Nobility Archive). This archive of the Union of German nobility associations has always been the author of both GHdA and GGH. In contentious questions, the German Nobility Rights Committee of this union decides.

However, no single volume of the Fürstliche Häuser of GHdA or GGH includes all the families of German and European royal, princely and ducal families that were annually included in the Hofkalender or Almanach de Gotha. Rather, they are recorded alternately in successive volumes. Therefore it is necessary to use multiple volumes to trace all of Europe's royal families. With regard to the current information, the archive works together with the respective family heads and is dependent on the cooperation and consent of the families for reasons of information privacy. Because of this required legwork, not that many princely and ducal houses of France, the UK, Italy and other countries are included, while the German ones, as well as the ruling and formerly ruling royal families of Europe are covered quite reliably.

== London publication (since 1998) ==
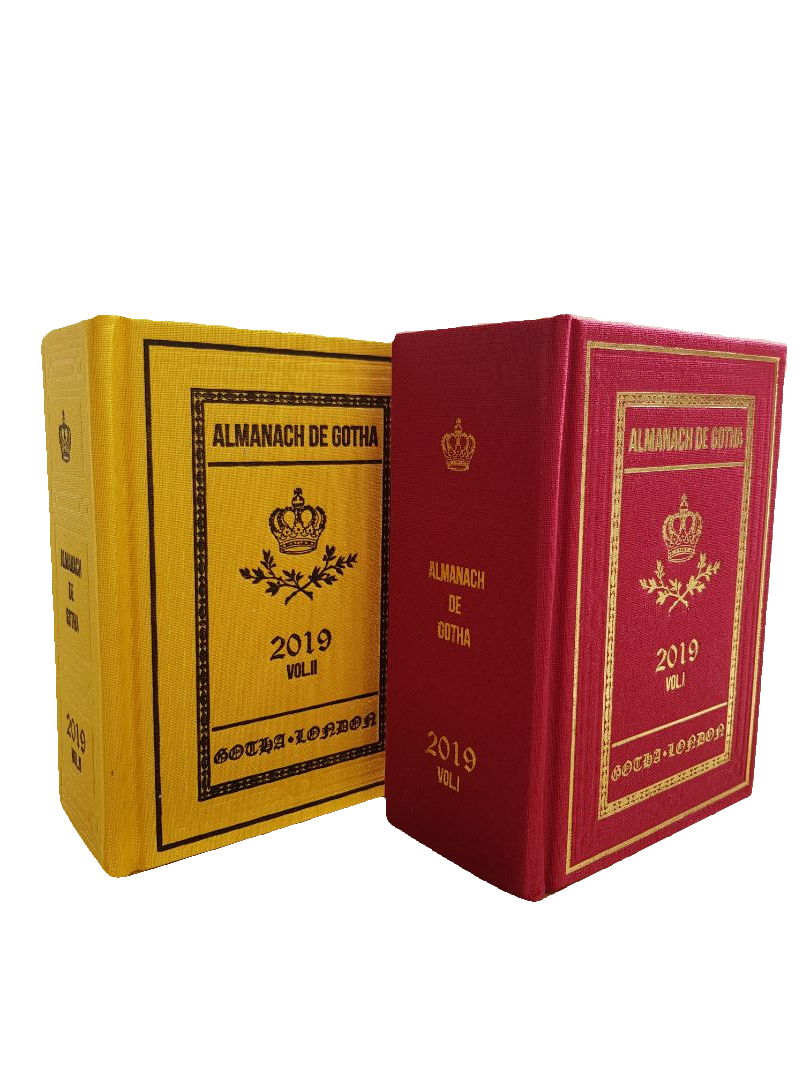
Almanach de Gotha, 2019, Volumes I & II

In 1992 the family of Justus Perthes re-established its right to the use of the name Almanach de Gotha. The company Justus Perthes Verlag Gotha GmbH (a subsidiary of Ernst Klett Schulbuchverlag GmbH) then sold these rights in 1995 to a new company, Almanach de Gotha Limited, formed in London. The new publisher launched the 182nd edition on 16 March 1998 at Claridge's Hotel. It was written in English instead of French, as the editor felt that English was now the language of diplomacy. Charlotte Pike served as editor of the 1998 edition only and John Kennedy as managing director and publisher. The new publishers also revived the Committee of Patrons under the presidency of King Juan Carlos I of Spain and chairmanship of King Michael I of Romania. Upon his death, King Michael was succeeded by Albert II, Prince of Monaco.

The London publisher produced a further four editions of volume I (1999, 2000, 2003 and 2004), based on the 1998 edition, which included Europe's and South America's reigning, formerly reigning, and mediatised princely houses, and a single edition of volume II in 2001 edited by John Kennedy and Ghislain Crassard, which included other non-sovereign princely and ducal houses of Europe. A review in The Economist criticised the low editorial standards and attacked volume II for a lack of genealogical accuracy. A new edition of volume I was published in 2012 under the editorship of John James. A review in The Times Literary Supplement praised the 2012 volume I for a "punctilious itemisation of titles, lineage and heraldry [aiming] for scholarship rather than sensation ..." Since 2022, Italian publisher Ettore Gallelli has published the Gotha Calendar in Italian.

== Structure ==
As it was the practice of the diplomatic corps to employ official titles, to adhere to local precedence and etiquette, and to tender congratulations and condolences to members of the dynasty of the nation to which they were assigned, the almanac included a Calendrier des Diplomates ("Diplomats' Calendar") section, which detailed major national holidays, anniversaries, ceremonies and royal birthdates.

Following World War I and the fall of many royal houses, fewer regulatory authorities remained to authenticate the use of titles; however the Almanach de Gotha continued the practice of strict verification of information, requesting certified copies of letters patent, genealogies confirmed by competent authorities, documents, decrees and references for titles claimed. Europe's middle and lower nobility (families whose principal title ranked below that of prince or duke — except mediatized families, listed in a section of their own) were not included in the almanac. Nor were the grandees or ducal families of Portugal and Spain (where titles, being transmissible through both male and female lines, were regularly inherited by descendants of non-patrilineal lineage). Families of some Italian and East European nations (e.g. Russia, Romania), where the princely title was claimed by many, were also incomplete. Yet the reigning, formerly reigning and noble families included in the almanac numbered in the hundreds by the time the almanac ceased publication in 1944.

In 1890 the almanac renamed II A to section II, and II B to section III. Dynasties reigning over non-European nations were listed in section I B. Families which became extinct were listed for the final time in the year following the death of the last member, male or female, and subsequent editions referred readers to that volume.

Families that ceased to be included for other reasons, such as lack of proof of a family's legitimate descendants or discovery that it did not hold a valid princely or ducal title, were omitted from then on, but added, along with dates of previous insertion, to a list after the last section of each Annuaire Genealogique (Genealogical Yearbook), which page was entitled Liste des Maisons authrefois publiées dans la 3e partie de l'Almanach de Gotha ("List of Houses formerly published in the 3rd section of the Almanach de Gotha.")

From 1927, the almanac ceased to include all families in each year's edition, and instead rotated entries every few years. Where titles and styles (such as Serene Highness) had ceased to be recognized by national governments (e.g. Germany, Austria, Czechoslovakia), the almanac provided associated dates and details, but continued to attribute such titles and styles to individuals and families, consistent with its practice since the French Revolution; deposed sovereigns and dynasties continued to be accorded their former titles and rank, but dates of deposition were noted, and titles exclusively associated with sovereignty (e.g. emperor, queen, grand duke, crown princess) were not accorded to those who had not borne them during the monarchy. Titles of pretence below sovereign rank were accorded to members of formerly reigning dynasties as reported by heads of their houses, otherwise self-assumed titles were not used. The almanac included an explicit disclaimer announcing that known biographical details, such as birth dates and divorces, would not be suppressed.

== See also ==
- Almanach de Bruxelles (defunct)
- Burke's Peerage
- Debrett's Peerage & Baronetage
- Carnet Mondain
- High Life de Belgique
- Libro d'Oro
  - Libro d'Oro della Nobiltà italiana (official register)
  - Libro d'Oro della Nobiltà italiana (private publication)
- Social Register
- Kulavruttanta
- Annuario della Nobiltà Italiana
- Shinsen Shōjiroku
