= Giovanni Battista =

Wikimedia disambiguation page

Giovanni Battista was a common Italian given name (see Battista for those with the surname) in the 16th-18th centuries. It refers to "John the Baptist" in English, the French equivalent is "Jean-Baptiste". Common nicknames include Giambattista, Gianbattista, Giovambattista, or Giambo. In Genoese the nickname was Baciccio, and a common abbreviation was Giovan Battista, Giobatta or simply G.B.. The people listed below are Italian unless noted otherwise.

- Giovanni Battista Adriani (c.1511–1579), historian.
- Giovanni Battista Agnello (fl. 1560–1577), author and alchemist.
- Giovanni Battista Aleotti (1546–1636), architect.
- Giovanni Battista Amendola (1848–1887), sculptor.
- Giovanni Battista Amici (1786–1863), astronomer and microscopist.
- Giovanni Battista Angioletti (1896–1961), writer and journalist.
- Giovanni Battista Ballanti (1762–1835), sculptor.
- Giovanni Battista Barbiani (1593–1650), painter.
- Giovanni Battista Beccaria (1716–1781), physicist.
- Giovanni Battista Bellandi, sculptor.
- Giovanni Battista Belzoni (1778–1823), explorer.
- Giovanni Battista Bernero (1736–1796), sculptor.
- Giovanni Battista Brocchi (1772–1826), mineralogist and geologist.
- Giovanni Battista Bugatti (1780–1869), executioner.
- Giovanni Battista Buonamente (c.1595–1642), composer and violinist.
- Giovanni Battista Caccini, sculptor.
- Giovanni Battista Caporali (1476–1560), painter.
- Giovanni Battista Caprara (1733–1810), statesman and cardinal.
- Giovanni Battista Caracciolo (1578–1635), artist.
- Giovanni Battista Casanova, painter, brother of Giacomo Casanova.
- Giovanni Battista Castello, painter.
- Giovanni Battista Casti (1724–1803), poet and librettist.
- Giovanni Battista Cavalcaselle (1820–1897), writer and art critic.
- Giovanni Battista Cibo, birth name of Pope Innocent VIII (1432–1492).
- Giovanni Battista Cima (c.1459–c.1517), painter.
- Giovanni Battista Cimaroli (1653–1714), painter.
- Giovanni Battista Cini (1525–c.1586), playwright.
- Giovanni Battista Cipriani (1727–1785), painter and engraver.
- Giovanni Battista Cirri (1724–1808), cellist and composer.
- Giovanni Battista Crespi (1557–1663), painter, sculptor, and architect.
- Giovanni Battista de Campania (1633–1639), 64th Minister General of the OFM
- Giovanni Battista Dieter (1903–1955), German priest.
- Giovanni Battista Donati (1826–1873), astronomer.
- Giovanni Battista Doni (c.1593–1647), musicologist.
- Giovanni Battista Draghi (c.1640–1708), composer.
- Giovanni Battista Ferrandini (1710–1793), composer.
- Giovanni Battista Ferrari, botanist.
- Giovanni Battista Foggini (1652–1737), sculptor.
- Giovanni Battista Gaulli (1639–1709), painter.
- Giovanni Battista Giraldi (1504–1573), novelist and poet.
- Giovanni Battista Grassi (1854–1925), zoologist.
- Giovanni Battista Guadagnini (1711–1786), luthier.
- Giovanni Battista Guarini (1538–1612), poet and diplomat.
- Giovanni Battista Guelphi, 18th century sculptor
- Giovanni Battista Hodierna (1597–1660), astronomer.
- Giovanni Battista di Jacopo, birth name of Rosso Fiorentino (1494–1540), Italian painter.
- Giovanni Battista Lacchini (1884–1967), astronomer.
- Giovanni Battista Landolina, landowner and intellectual.
- Giovanni Battista Lenzi (1951–2009), Italian politician.
- Giovanni Battista Locatelli (disambiguation), several people
- Giovanni Battista Lulli, birth name of Jean-Baptiste Lully (1632–1687), Italian-born French composer.
- Giovanni Battista Lusieri (1755–1821), Italian painter who was involved in the removal of the Elgin Marbles.
- Giovanni Battista Maganza (1513–1586), painter.
- Giovanni Battista Maini (1690–1752), sculptor.
- Giovanni Battista Mancini (1714–1800), voice teacher.
- Giovanni Battista Martini (1706–1784), musician.
- Giovanni Battista Michelini (1604–1655), painter.
- Giovanni Battista Monte (1498–1551), humanist physician and professor at Padua.
- Giovanni Battista Monti, painter.
- Giovanni Battista Enrico Antonio Maria Montini, birth name of Pope Paul VI (1897–1978).
- Giovanni Battista Morgagni (1682–1771), anatomist.
- Giovanni Battista Moroni (1520–1578), painter.
- Giovanni Battista Orsenigo (1837–1904), monk and dentist.
- Giovanni Battista Orsini, Grand Master of the Order of the Knights Hospitaller from 1467 to 1476
- Giovanni Battista Paggi (1554–1627), painter.
- Giovanni Battista Pamphili, birth name of Pope Innocent X (1574–1655).
- Giovanni Battista Pergolesi (1710–1736), composer.
- Giovanni Battista Pescetti (c.1704–1766), composer and organist.
- Giovanni Battista Piazzetta (c.1683–1754), painter.
- Giovanni Battista Pioda (1808–1882), Swiss politician.
- Giovanni Battista Piranesi (1720–1778), artist.
- Giovanni Battista di Quadro, Polish-Italian architect.
- Giovanni Battista Re (b. 1934), cardinal.
- Giovanni Battista Riccioli (1598–1671), astronomer.
- Giovanni Battista Rinuccini (1592–1653), archbishop.
- Giovanni Battista de Rossi (archaeologist) (1822–1894), archaeologist.
- Giovanni Battista Rubini (1794–1854), singer.
- Giovanni Battista Sammartini (c.1700–1775), composer and organist.
- Giovanni Battista Salvi da Sassoferrato (1609–1685), painter.
- Giovanni Battista Santini, architect.
- Giovanni Battista Sidotti (1668–1714), Jesuit priest and missionary.
- Giovanni Battista Tempesti, painter.
- Giovanni Battista Tiepolo (1696–1770), painter.
- Giovanni Battista Trevano, architect.
- Giovanni Battista Vaccarini (1702–1768), architect.
- Giovanni Battista Venturi (1746–1822), physicist.
- Giovanni Battista Viotti (1755–1824), violinist and composer.
- Giovanni Battista Vitali, composer.
- Giovanni Battista Volpati, (1633–1706), painter.
- Giovanni Battista Zupi (c.1590–1650), astronomer, mathematician, and Jesuit priest.

== Giambattista ==
- Giambattista Andreini (1578–1650), actor and playwright.
- Giambattista Basile (1575–1632), poet, courtier, and fairytale collector.
- Giambattista Benedetti (1530–1590), mathematician.
- Giambattista Bodoni (1740–1813), engraver and printer.
- Giambattista De Curtis (1860–1926), painter and poet.
- Giambattista Gelli (1498–1563), humanist.
- Giambattista Marini (1569–1625), poet.
- Giambattista Pittoni (1687–1767), painter.
- Giambattista della Porta (1538–1615), scholar, polymath, and child prodigy.
- Giambattista Valli, fashion designer.
- Giambattista Vico (1668–1744), philosopher, historian, jurist.
- Giambattista Busi (born 1968), former racing driver

== Giovan Battista ==
- Giovan Battista Aleotti (1546–1636), Italian architect
- Giovan Battista Carpi (1927–1999), Italian cartoonist
- Giovan Battista Cavagna (c. 1545–1613), Italian architect, engineer, and painter
- Giovan Battista della Cerva (c. 1515–1580), Italian painter
- Giovan Battista Cini (1525–1586), Italian playwright
- Giovan Battista di Crollalanza (1819–1892), Italian writer
- Giovan Battista Fabbri (1926–2015), Italian football player and manager
- Giovan Battista Perasso aka Balilla, 18th century legendary revolutionary
- Giovan Battista Pirovano (1937–2014), Italian footballer
- Giovan Battista Ruoppolo (1629–1693), Neapolitan painter
