= Debrett's =

British publisher specialising in peerage

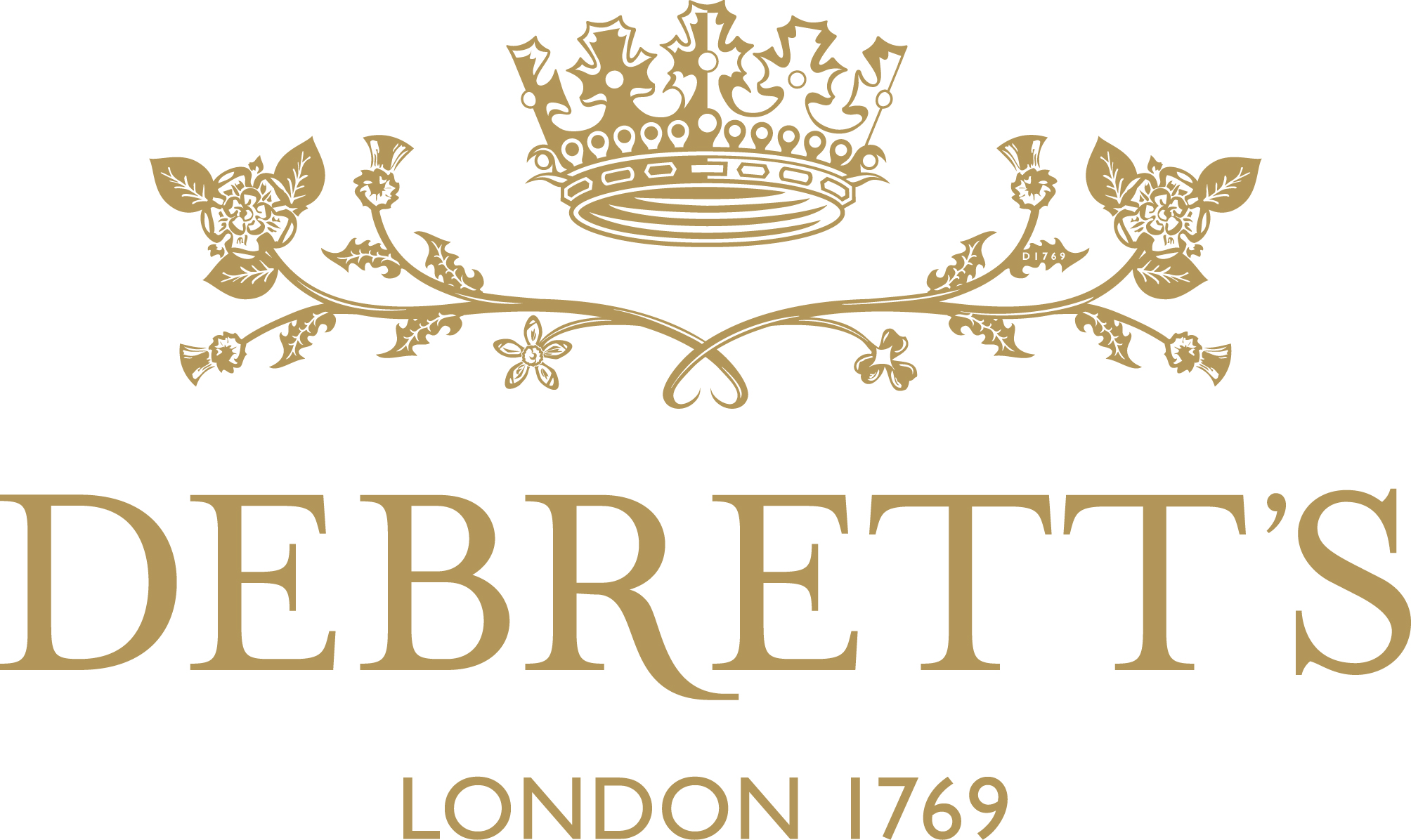
- Founded: 1769; 257 years ago
- Founder: John Debrett
- Country of origin: United Kingdom
- Headquarters location: London, England
- Distribution: Gazelle Book Services
- Official website: debretts.com

Debrett's (/dəˈbrɛts/) is a British publisher, etiquette coaching, and financial advisory company founded in 1769 by John Debrett. The company is best known for cataloguing the lineage of nobility and landed gentry in the UK.

== John Debrett ==
Debrett (8 January 1753 – 15 November 1822) was born in London to Jean Louys de Bret, a Huguenot-French cook and Rachel Panchaud. His father worked for the Earl of Ilchester. After apprenticeship with bookseller and publisher Robert Davis. In 1780, he moved across Piccadilly to work for journalist and publisher John Almon, who, in 1769, edited and published the first edition of The New Peerage.

Almon retired in 1790, and passed on the editorship to Debrett. In 1802, Debrett began publishing Almon's Peerage under his own name as Debrett's Peerage. Despite declaring bankruptcy twice, he continued to be a bookseller until his retirement in 1814. The 15th edition published in 1823 was his last as an editor. He died on 15 November 1822, and is buried at St James's Church, Piccadilly.

Debrett married Sophia Granger (1762–1833), daughter of Captain John Granger and Sophia Spencley, on 27 April 1787 in Piccadilly. Although none of the couple's six children followed in their father's footsteps, Granger was known to have worked with Debrett and, at one point, ran the business herself.

== Publications ==
Debrett's has published a range of guides on traditional British etiquette, dating from the mid 1900s. Those currently in print include Debrett's A–Z of Modern Manners, Debrett's Guide for the Modern Gentleman and Debrett's Handbook, a revised and updated version of its Correct Form. Debrett's Wedding Guide (first published in 2007) was revised in 2017 and published as Debrett's Wedding Handbook.

Debrett's Peerage & Baronetage, a book which includes a short history of the family of each titleholder, was previously published roughly every five years. First printed in London in 1802 as Peerage in England, Scotland and Ireland, a similar publication Burke's Peerage was first published in 1826 as a guide to the peerage of Great Britain and Ireland. The last printed edition was the 2019 and 150th edition, published in the company's 250th year. Charles Kidd was the editor of the Peerage for nearly 40 years; he was the consulting editor on the last edition, which was edited by Susan Morris, Wendy Bosberry-Scott and Gervase Belfield of Debrett Ancestry Research Ltd, a sister company of Debrett's.

Debrett's [Illustrated Heraldic and Biographical] House of Commons and the Judicial Bench was published from 1867 to 1931. Butler calls it "particularly useful".

=== Debrett's People of Today ===
Debrett's People of Today, an annual publication between 1988 and 2017, contained biographical details of approximately 20,000 notable people from the entire spectrum of British society. The selection of entrants was made by the editorial staff of Debrett's and entries were reviewed annually to ensure accuracy and relevance. Entries include details of career, education, family, recreations and membership of clubs as well as contact addresses.

=== Debrett's 500 ===
Since 2014, Debrett's has published an annual list of the UK's 500 most influential people across 24 sectors. In 2017, the list was published in the Saturday Telegraph Magazine.

== Coaching ==
Debrett's Academy was established in 2012 to provide coaching in interpersonal skills to individuals and corporations. The courses for businesses cover topics such as public speaking, networking, sales pitches, relationship management, personal presentation and dress codes. The courses for private client focus on confidence-building and social competence, as well as personal presentation and impact, career progression and digital networking.

The company's non-profit arm, Debrett's Foundation, provides coaching through the Debrett's Academy to sixth form students from UK schools in business skills, as well as access to internships, work experience and mentoring opportunities.

== Appearances in popular culture ==
In the opening pages of Jane Austen's Persuasion (1818), the vain and snobbish Sir Walter Elliot loves to look at his own family's entry in Debrett's.

In series three of the television series Downton Abbey, Cora Crawley, The Countess of Grantham mentions Debrett's in jest when defending the choice of her late daughter, Sybil, to have her daughter baptised as Catholic.

There was a storyline in Doonesbury where Zonker had a large cash windfall with which he planned to purchase a British peerage. To prepare for his new role, he had a friend quiz him from Debrett's, to great comic effect.

In Brideshead Revisited by Evelyn Waugh, Sebastian and Charles visit Brideshead together for the first time, and Sebastian will not let Charles meet his family. He comments: "You don't know what you've been saved. There are lots of us. Look them up in Debrett."

In Montague Rhodes James's "The Residence at Whitminster", Uncle Oldys draws his information about the spooking Viscount Kildonan from Debrett's Peerage: "It's all in Debrett's – two little fat books".

In season 2 of Bridgerton, Kate Sharma refers to Debrett's while discussing potential suitors for her sister.

In Noël Coward's song "The Stately Homes of England" (from 1938 musical Operette), four British noblemen sing: "Reading in Debrett of us, / This fine patrician quartette of us, / We can feel extremely proud." Another song by Coward, "Imagine the Duchess's Feelings", states that "dignity lurks / in the shadows of Debrett".

== See also ==
- Almanach de Gotha
- Burke's Peerage
- Carnet Mondain
- High Life de Belgique
- Libro d'Oro
- Powerlist
- Social Register
- Kulavruttanta
