= High Life de Belgique =

Belgian publishing house

- Edited by: Editions Venture
- Language: French
- Genre: Directory
- Published: since 1880
- Media type: Print
- Website: highlife.be

The High Life de Belgique (French for High Life of Belgium) is a Belgian publishing house that was founded in 1880.

== History ==
It publishes annually a directory containing the contact details of more than twelve thousand families of the high society (nobility and upper bourgeoisie), Belgian or foreign, established in Belgium. This directory coexists with the Carnet Mondain; they are the Belgian equivalents of the American Social Register or the French Bottin Mondain and French High Life.

== See also ==
- Carnet Mondain
- Social Register
- Libro d'Oro
- Almanach de Bruxelles (defunct)
- Almanach de Gotha
- Burke's peerage
- Belgian nobility
- Bourgeois of Brussels
- Seven Noble Houses of Brussels
