= Crollalanza (surname) =

Crollalanza is an Italian surname. Notable people with the surname include:

- Araldo di Crollalanza (1892–1986), Italian journalist and politician
- Giovan Battista di Crollalanza (1819–1892), Italian writer
