= The LaMontages brothers =

Group of 1920s bootleggers

The LaMontages brothers -- Rene, Montaigu, William and Morgan—were high society bootleggers who made $2,000,000 annually through their illegal business during the early years of alcohol Prohibition in the United States.

A tip from a disgruntled employee led to their arrest and conviction, although the U.S. Assistant Attorney General, Mabel Willibrand, reported that "every conceivable political and personal appeal, including an appeal by a Cabinet officer, was made to squash the case." On February 9, 1923, the federal court fined each brother $2,000 and sentenced three of them to four months in prison and one to two months. However, it was 1929 before their listings in the Social Register were dropped.
