= Carnet Mondain =

Belgian reference publication

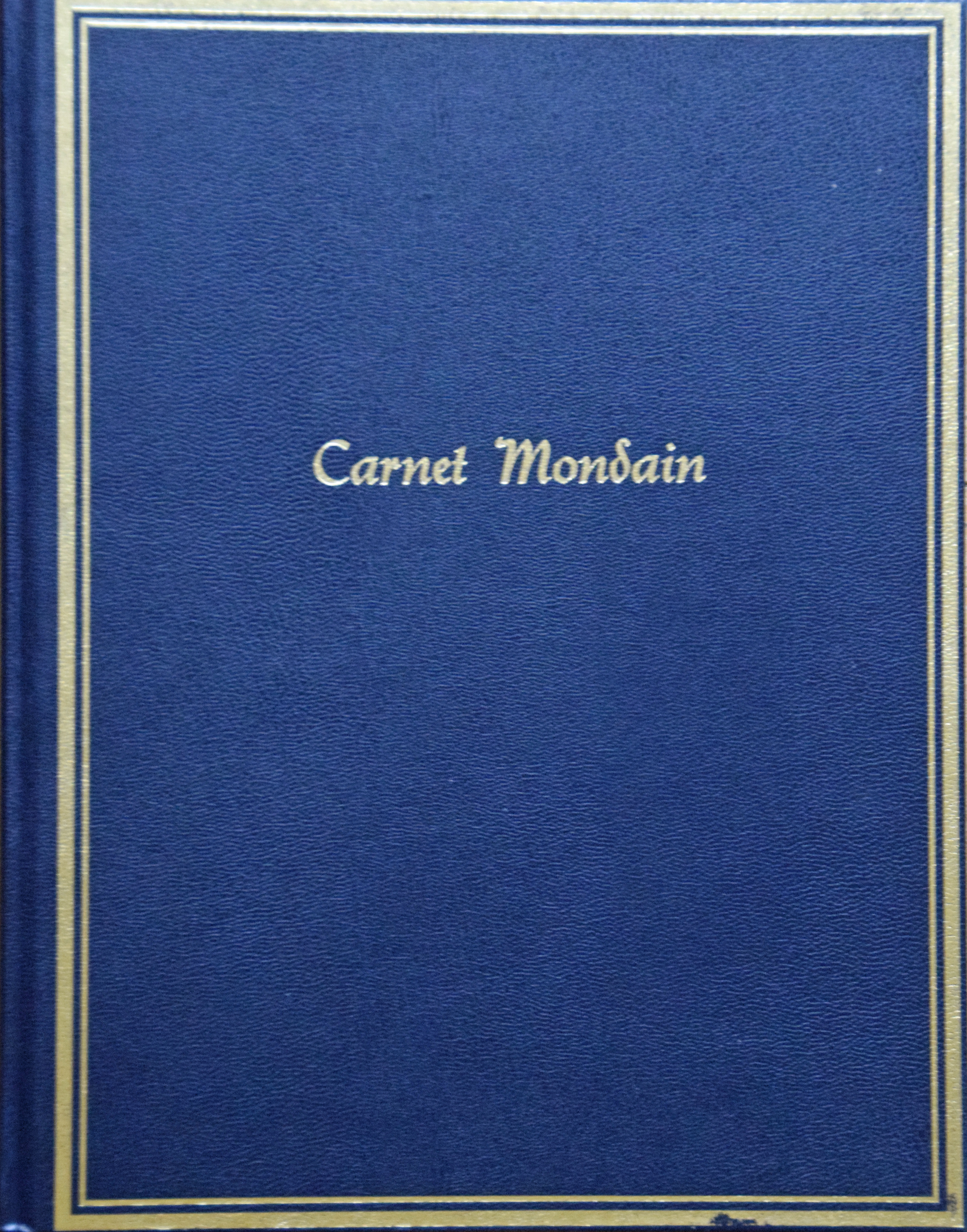
- Cover
- Country: Belgium
- Language: French
- Genre: Directory
- Publisher: Les Editions CLB s.a.
- Published: 1983-today, every December
- Media type: Print and web
- Website: carnetmondain.be

The Carnet Mondain (English: Social Notebook) of Belgium is a directory featuring high society (nobility and upper bourgeoisie), Belgian or foreign, established in Belgium, as well as members of Belgian families established abroad. It is equivalent to the Social Register in the United States. Its tagline is "the Familial and Social Belgium" (French: la Belgique Familiale et Mondaine). It also publishes the coats of arms of these families, when armigerous.

== History ==
This work, which was an initiative of Prince Charles-Louis of Merode, has the advantage of clearly showing the ties of descent between people (up to two degrees). This directory coexists with the High Life de Belgique, which pursues similar objectives.

== Admission ==
Persons wishing to be registered, must submit a written candidacy request supported by three unrelated persons included in previous editions. These new applications are then submitted to the Carnet Mondain admissions committee, which rules in full independence.

== See also ==
- High Life de Belgique
- Social Register
- Burke's peerage
- Almanach de Bruxelles (defunct)
- Almanach de Gotha
- Libro d'Oro
- Belgian nobility
- Bourgeois of Brussels
- Seven Noble Houses of Brussels
- Belgian heraldry
- Kulavruttanta
