= Ethel Spencer Lloyd =

American art educator, embroiderer, and jewelry designer

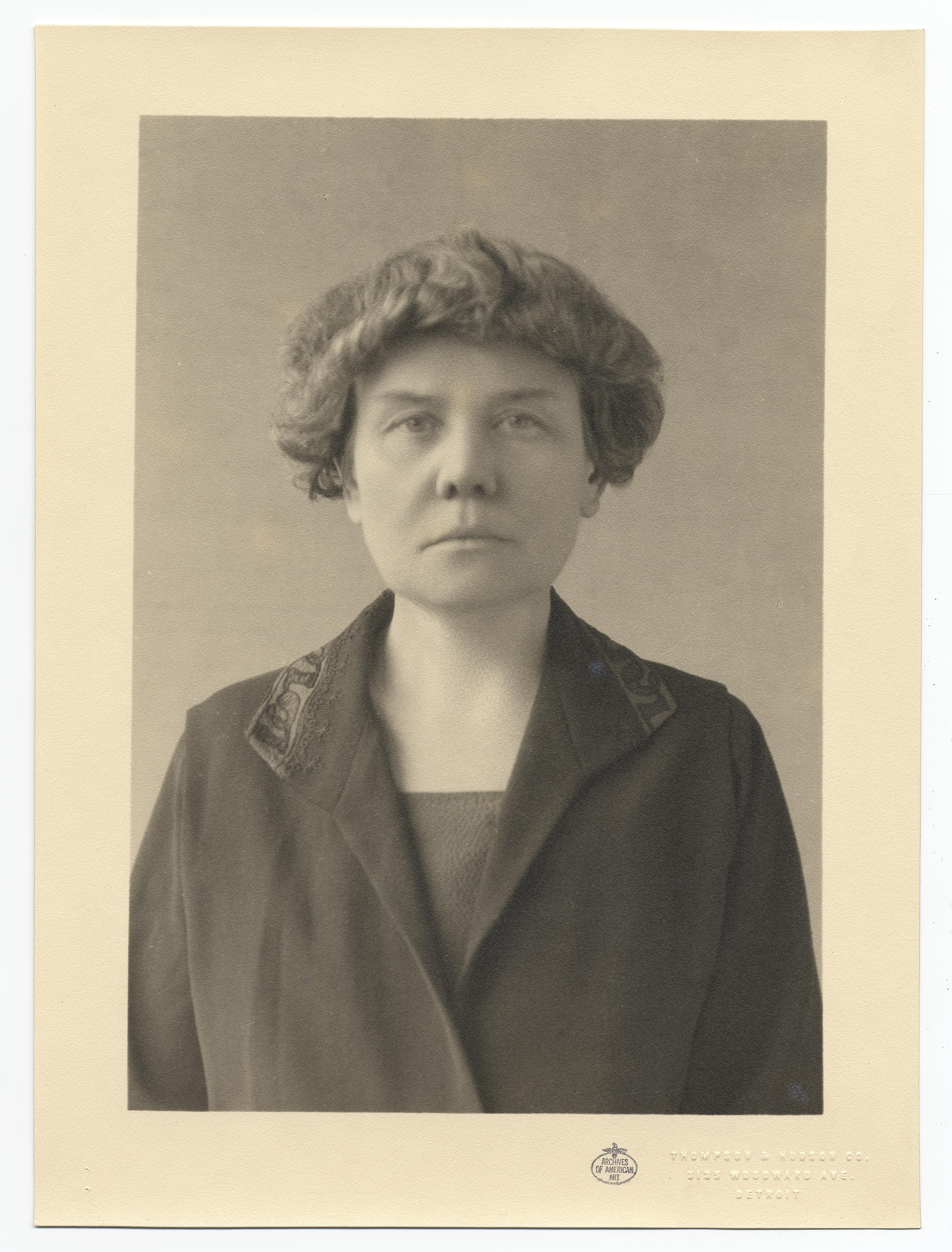
- Born: Ethel Spencer; 1875-01-25; Albany, New York, United States
- Died: Michigan
- Known for: Metalworking, embroidery and Jewelry
- Movement: Arts-and-Crafts-style

Ethel Spencer Lloyd (January 25, 1875 – 1970) was an American art educator, embroiderer, and jewelry designer from Albany, New York, who is best known for creating intricate Arts-and-Crafts-style jewelry in Michigan.

== Life ==
Spencer Lloyd was born to a Social Register family in Albany and grew up in Detroit. As a jewelry designer, she worked with silver and made necklaces, pendants, brooches, belt buckles, and rings. Later in life, she also lectured on art and taught private piano lessons.

Her jewelry was part of the1906 Annual Exhibition of the Architectural League of New York.
