= Kulavruttanta =

Indian almanac

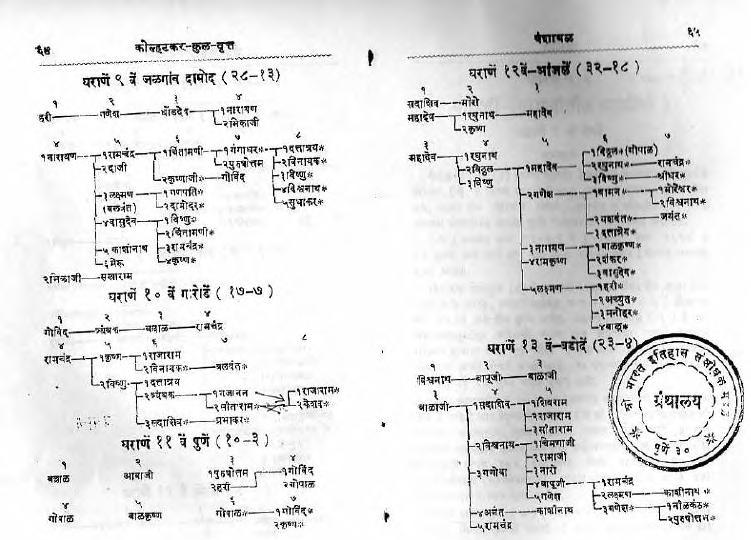
- Genealogy-page of a Kulavruttanta book titled 'Kolhatkar Kula Vrittanta' (September 1936, Pune) by Balkrishna Sridhar
- Authors: Various
- Original title: कुलवृत्तांत
- Language: Marathi
- Subject: Chitpavan Brahmins; Marathas; Nobility from the Maratha Empire
- Genre: Nobility, heraldry, genealogy
- Publication place: India
- Media type: Almanac, biographical dictionary

A Kulavruttanta or a Kul-vrttant (Marathi: कुलवृत्तांत; IAST: Kula-vr̥ttānta; lit. transl. family report), is a genealogical almanac and biographical dictionary, a format of genealogical record keeping predominantly found in the Indian state of Maharashtra.

== History ==
Kulavruttantas are categorically published by family name, or surname, and are usually in Marathi. They usually document various aspects of that particular family's history, heraldry, the etymology of their name, ancestral land holdings, migration maps, and religious traditions. The genealogical charts are usually sectioned based on each gharana, or branch, of the family; these are then followed by biographies of individuals within those gharanas; and followed finally by indices of births, deaths and marriages within the family.

Kulavruttantas have been historically attributed to the genealogical history of Chitpavan brahmins. The Bhat family, during their rule of the Maratha confederacy, are usually credited for commissioning surveys and censuses of Chitpavan brahmin households, recorded on paper or cloth scrolls. These scrolls are generally used as the references of the historical and genealogical data for the compilation of these almanacs. Beginning with the publication of the Kulavruttanta of the Apte family in 1915, throughout most of the 20th century, several other Chitpavan families have gone on to commission or publish their own versions. Historian and biographer Sadashiv Ranade has notably authored several of these.

In the 21st century, Kulavruttants have also been adopted by several other communities as a means of documenting their genealogical data, most notably the Maratha community.

== See also ==
- List of biographical dictionaries
- Hindu genealogy registers at Haridwar
- Almanach de Gotha
- Burke's Landed Gentry
- Debrett's Peerage & Baronetage
- Social Register
- Carnet Mondain
- Libro d'Oro
