= Adelskalender =

Adelskalender may refer to:

- Adelskalender (directory), a comprehensive directory of the nobility of a country or area
- Adelskalender (skating), a ranking for long track speed skating based on skaters' all-time personal records for certain distances
