= Bellandi =

Bellandi is a surname of Italian origin. Notable people with the surname include:

- Alice Bellandi (born 1998), Italian judoka
- Ernesto Bellandi (1842–1916), Italian painter
- Giovanni Battista Bellandi (early 16th century), Italian sculptor
- Nazario Carlo Bellandi (1919–2010), Italian music composer, organist, pianist and harpsichordist
