= Giovanni Battista Locatelli =

Giovanni Battista Locatelli may refer to:

- Giovanni Battista Locatelli (opera director)
- Giovanni Battista Locatelli (sculptor)
