= Annuario della Nobiltà Italiana =

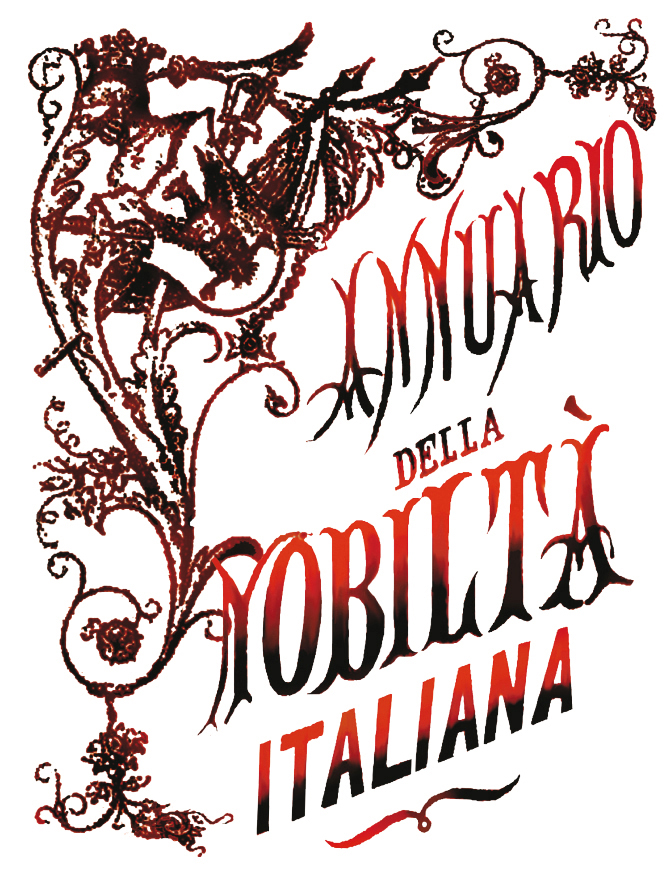
logo of the series of the 'Yearbook of the Italian Nobility'

Annuario della Nobiltà italiana (lit. 'Yearbook of the Italian Nobility') is a periodical publication dedicated to updating the registration status of Italian families recognised as noble or notable (lines historically possessing a coat of arms and with vita more nobilium) in the Kingdom of Italy and the pre-unitary old Italian States.

It was founded in Pisa in 1872 by Giovan Battista di Crollalanza and published there in 1879 after seven years of preparation. The typographical layout was inspired by that of the 19th century editions of the Gotha Almanac. It was published by the Italian Academy of Heraldry (Accademia Italiana di Araldica) in 27 editions until 1905: first in Pisa, then in Bari and finally in Mola di Bari. The first series was edited by Giovan Battista di Crollalanza, from 1878 to 1892, then by his son, Goffredo di Crollalanza, until 1904 and, after the Goffredo's death in Bari, by half-brother, Aldo di Crollalanza until 1905

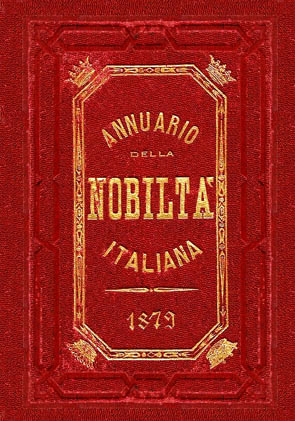
The cover of the first issue of'Annuario della nobiltà italiana, first edition, Pisa, 1879, by Giovan Battista di Crollalanza.

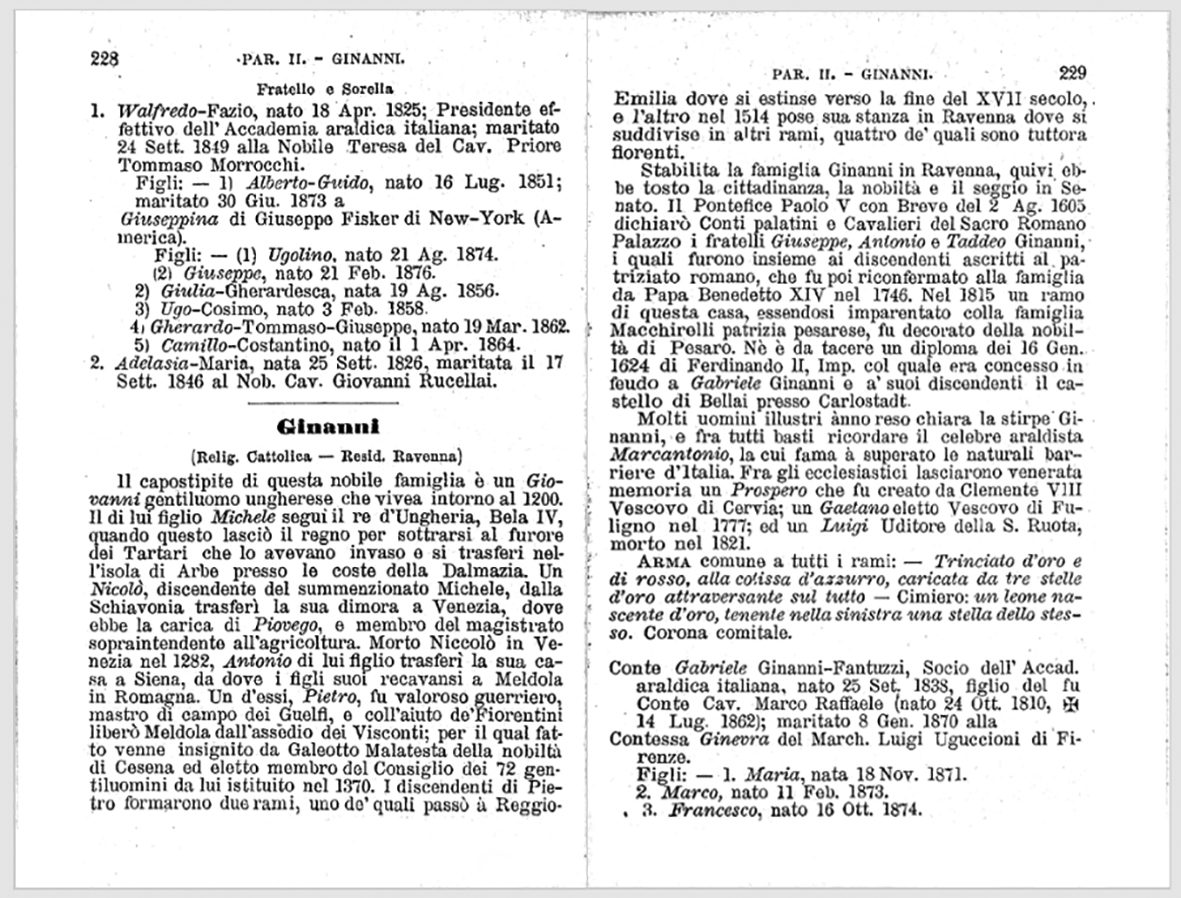
inside pages of the first issue of the Annuario della nobiltà italiana, 1st edition, Pisa, 1878, edited by Giovan Battista di Crollalanza

== First series ==
=== Subdivisions ===
The first series of the Yearbook of the Italian Nobility, published in 1879, is divided into 3 main parts, each containing the following categories:

1. Sovereign and former sovereign royal families of European states and Brazil, and the Supreme Pontiff;
2. Families defined as aristocratic by the editors of the Annuario themselves.

In addition to minor variations in the various subsequent editions up to the 17th, beginning with the 1892 edition - when Goffredo di Crollalanza took over the editorship of the periodical - it was decided to clarify some historical references to certain families: The editor himself, in the introduction of that year's edition, dissociated himself from some historical references to families considered noble, published in articles or supplements of the Giornale Araldico Genealogico Diplomatico Italiano, founded by Giovan Battista di Crollalanza, because he considered that they no longer met the criteria of scientificity and historical criticism. From the XXVI edition of 1904, the work is subdivided as follows:

1. Sovereign and former sovereign royal families of European states and Brazil and Supreme Pontiff;
2. Some families listed in the official register "Libro d'oro della nobiltà italiana" and in the official regional aristocratic lists published at the time. Some families not included in the regional lists already published are deleted without reference to previous editions;
3. Italian noble families residing abroad and holding titles of pre-unification states, and foreign noble families residing in Italy.
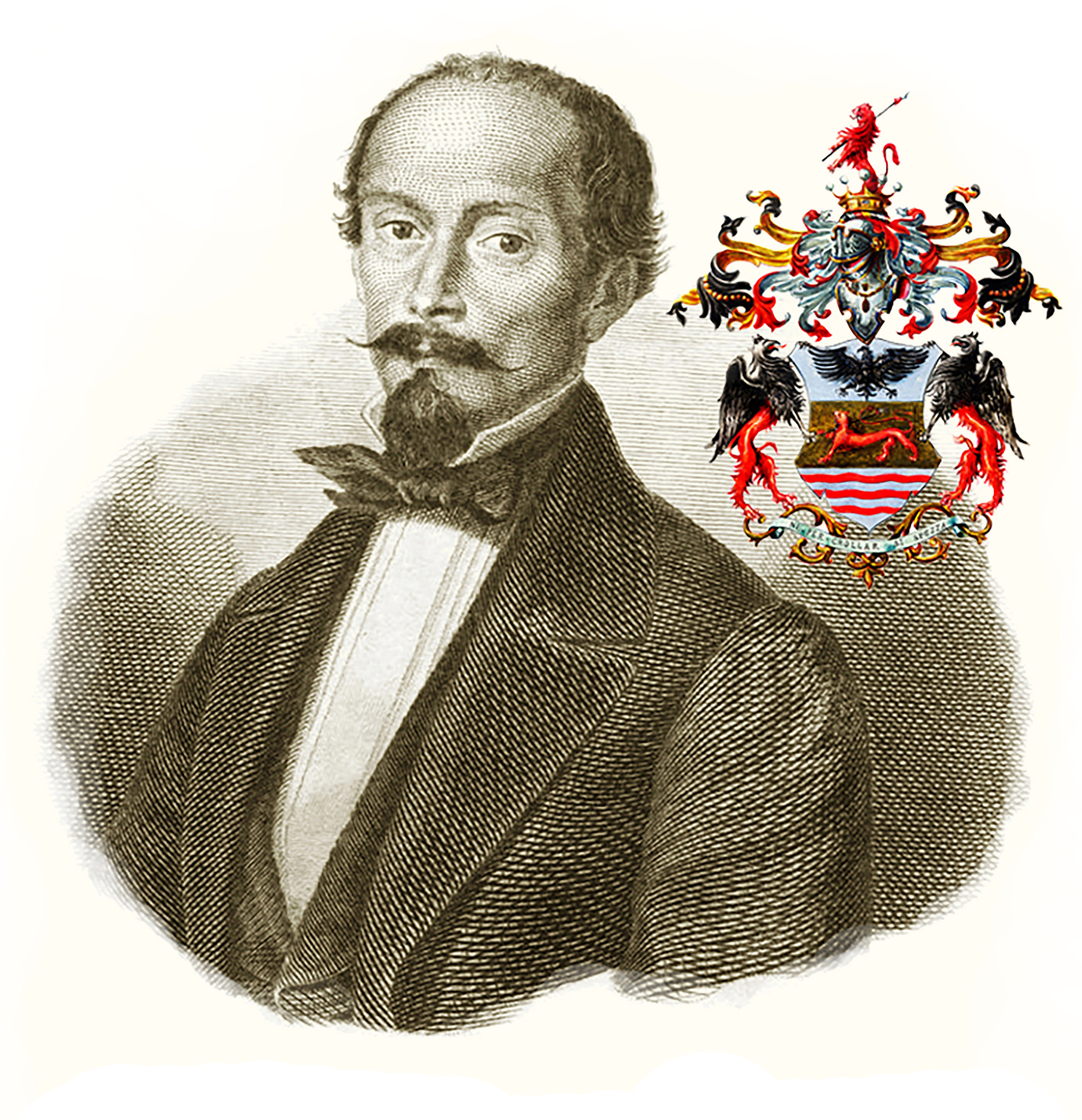
Giovan Battista di Crollalanza (1819-1892), founder of the Annuario and first director from 1878 to 1892 year.

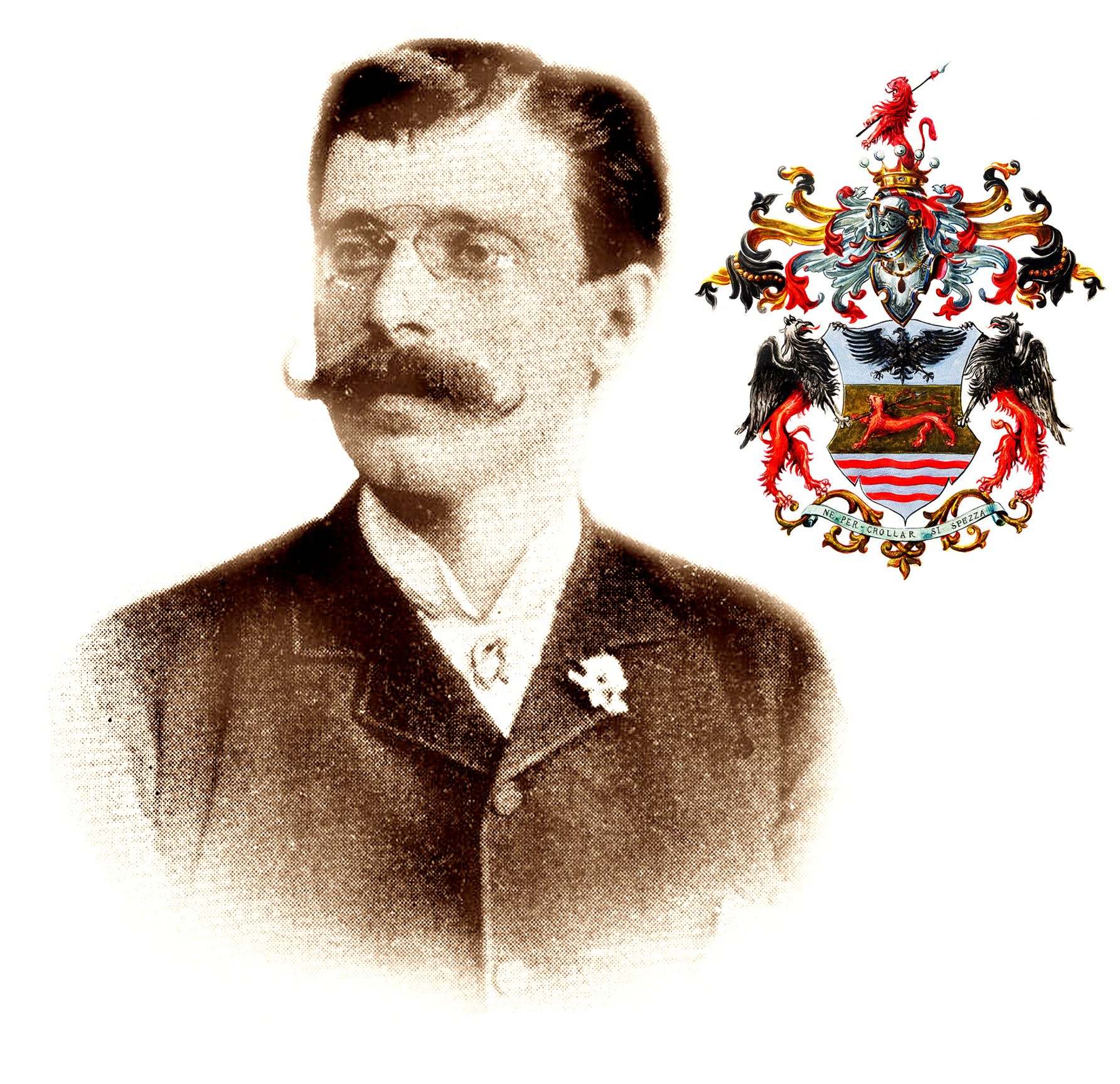
Goffredo di Crollalanza (1855-1905), second directory director from 1892 until 1904 year.

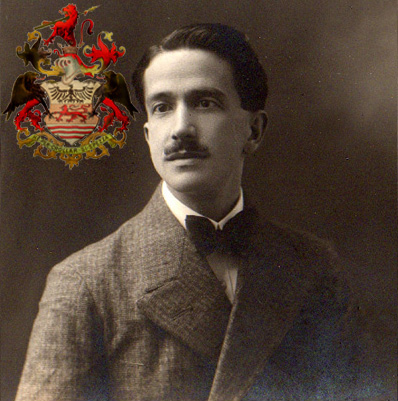
Aldo di Crollalanza (1883-?), third directory director from 1904 to 1905 year.

=== Awards ===
The "Accademia italiana d'araldica", which published the first series of the Annuario della nobiltà Italiana and the Giornale Araldico Genealogico Diplomatico Italiano in 1879, received the title of "Regia" at the same time as the foundation of the Annuario della nobiltà italiana. The same Accademia italiana d'araldica unanimously decided to award the gold medal for heraldic and genealogical research in 1896 to the Annuario della nobiltà Italiana, then edited by Goffredo di Crollalanza.

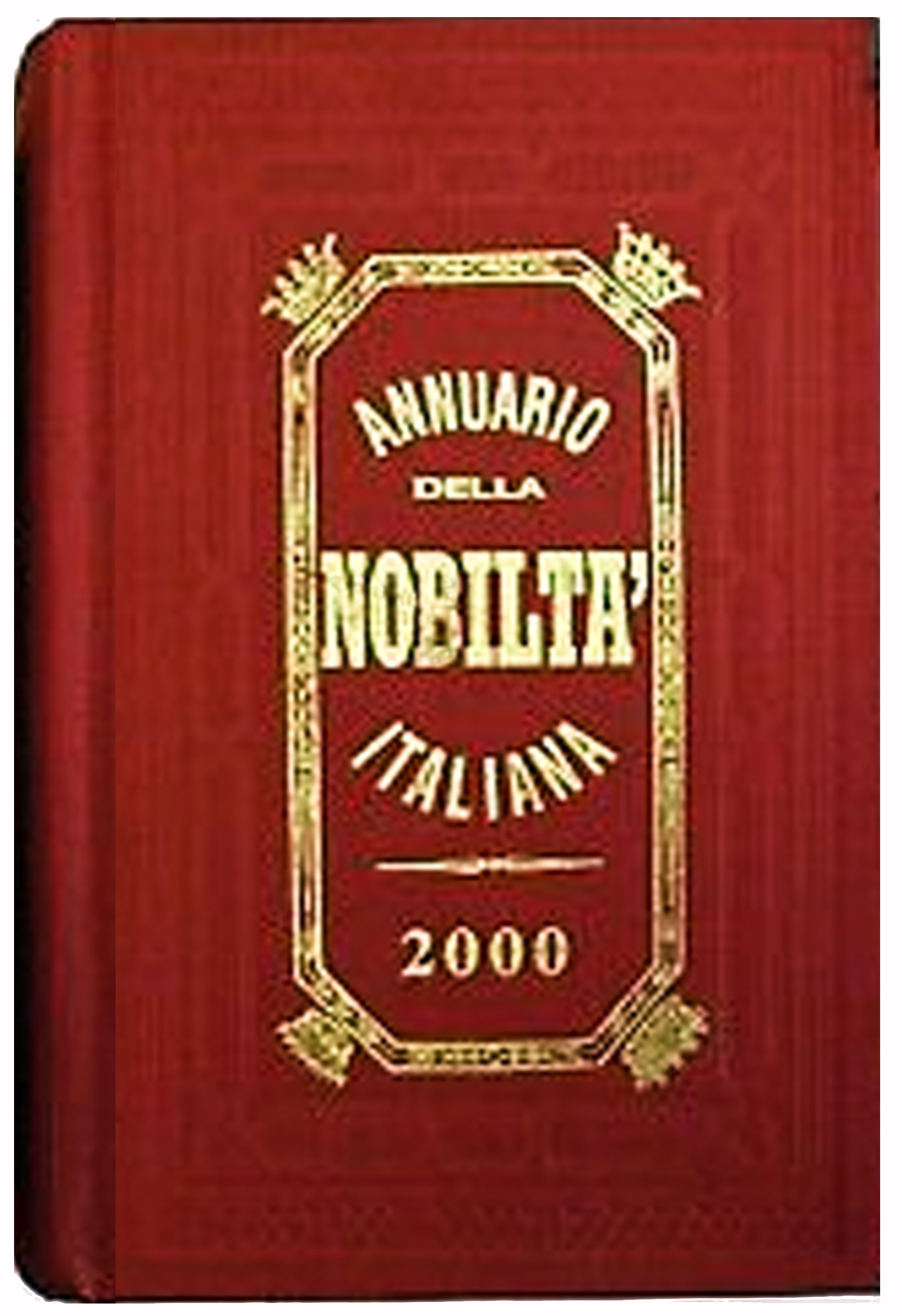
Cover of the first volume of the second series of the ‘Yearbook of the Italian Nobility’, 2000

== Second series ==
In 1998 the new series of the Annuario was founded in Milan by Andrea Borella (b. 1974-) who serves as the writer and director, of the Annuario, with the publication of the XXVIII edition, in two volumes, first by the S.A.G.I. publishing house (Società Araldica Genealogica Internazionale) and then by the Annuario della nobiltà Italiana Foundation Trust. The second series was born on the initiative of some members of the aristocracy who were also experts in genealogical research, such as the marquises Gabrio Visconti di Sanvito and Antonio Toraldo, in order to fill the lack of a periodic repertory dedicated to the genealogy of the descendants of noble families, combining the collection of current data with a very extensive and constant activity of anagraphic and heraldic archival research to retrieve biographical data, even of the deceased, thus filling the genealogical gaps found in the compilation of genealogical records and in the listing of the families treated. The scientific committee of the Yearbook was reconstituted, composed of experts in heraldry, genealogy and noble law, as well as exponents of ancient Italian noble families such as Count Enzo Capasso delle Pastene e di Caprara, Prince Maurizio Gonzaga di Vescovado, Prince Carlo Marullo di Condojanni, Prince Count Manfredi Pio di Savoia, Count Enrico Clerici, Sforza Marescotto of the Princes Ruspoli, Count Ermelino Matarazzo di Licosa, Count Carlo Pietro Zanardi Landi and many others.

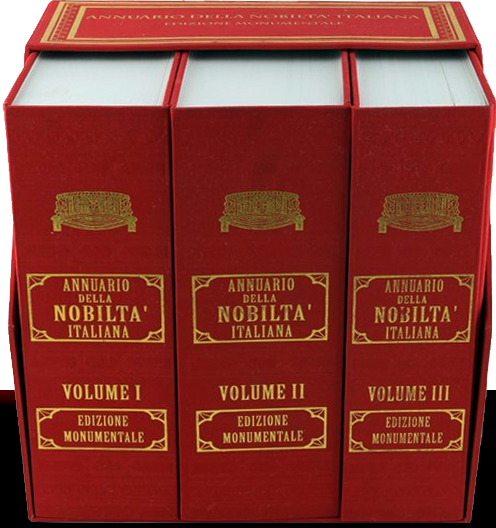
The spines of the three volumes of the XXX edition of the 'Yearbook of the Italian Nobility, 2006.

The honorary presidency of the series was assumed in January 2000 by Onda di Crollalanza, granddaughter of Goffredo and Aldo and great-granddaughter of Giovan Battista, until her death (18 August 2007), then by Araldo, Onda's half-brother (d. 29 November 2014). The current president is the latter's son, Goffredo (born 1974).The purpose of the new series is stated to be to archive, update and correct the registry, genealogical, historical and biographical data collected by Annuario in its database, in order to preserve the historical-genealogical memory of the lines descending from the ancient Italian nobility.

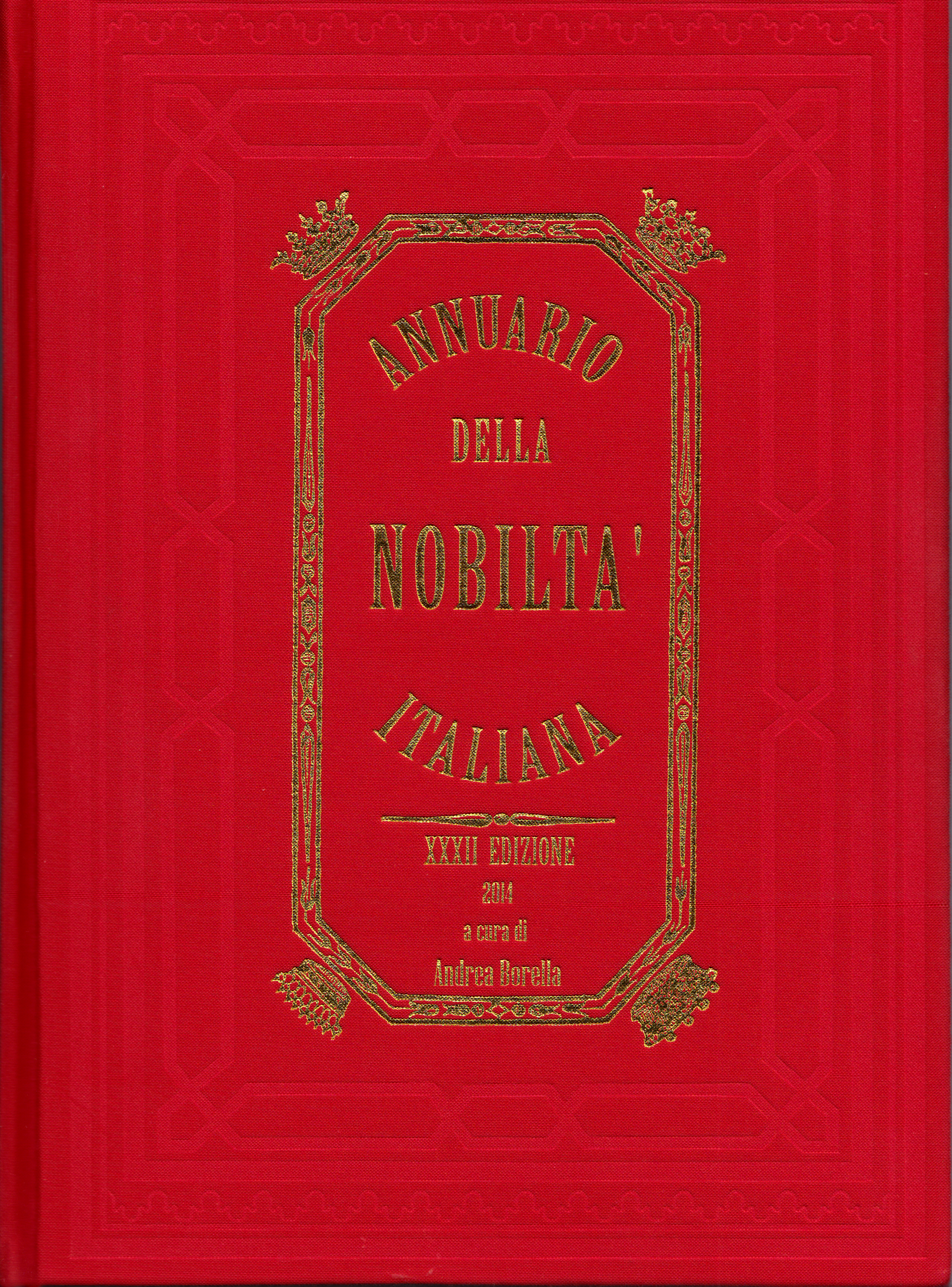
Cover page of the second series of the Annuario della nobiltà italiana, XXXII edition, Teglio, a2014, edited by Andrea Borella

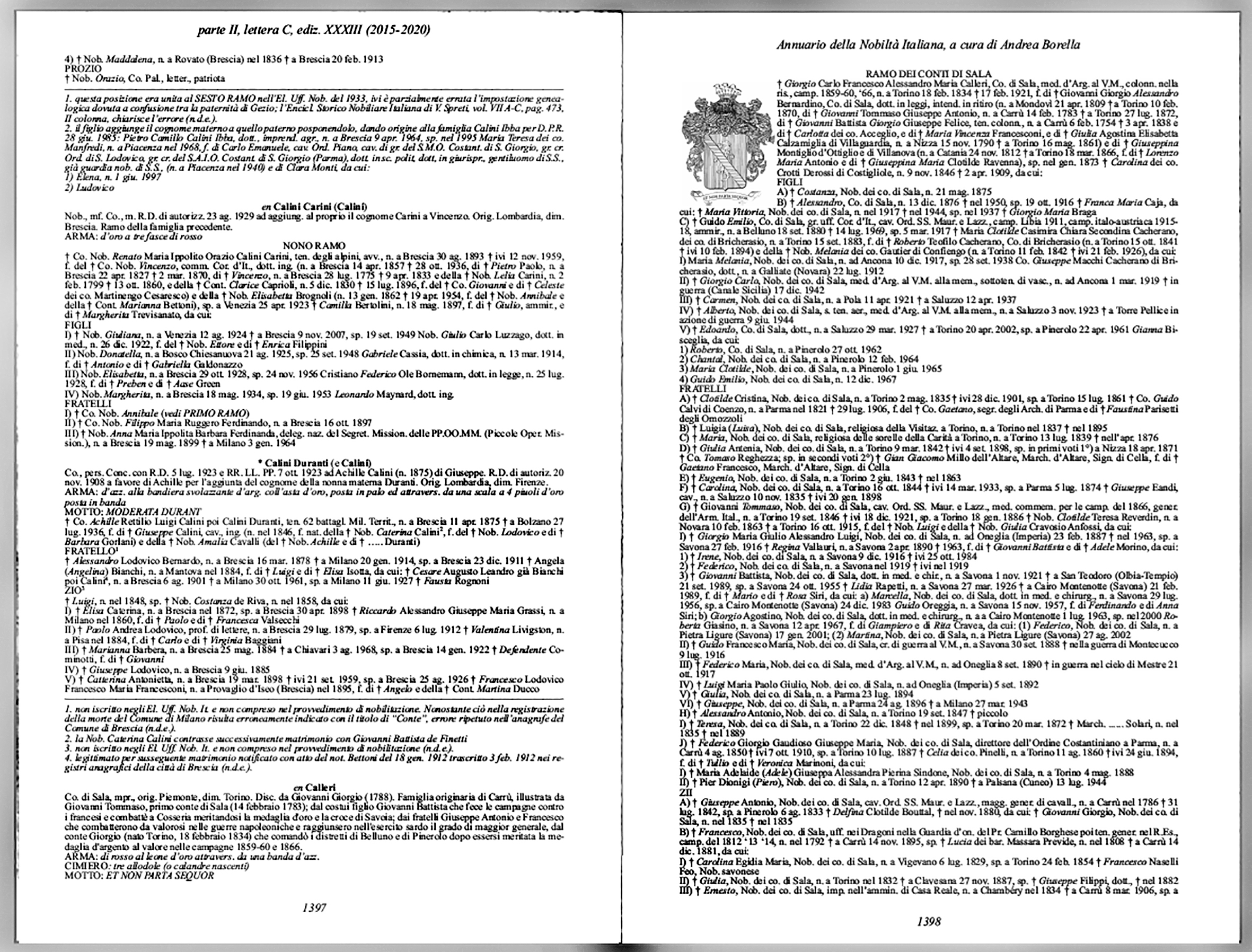
Inside pages of the second series of Annuario della Nobiltà italiana, XXXIII edition, Teglio, a2021, edited by Andrea Borella.

The XXX edition of 2006 and the XXXI of 2007-2010 were presented in the presence of the Head of the deposed Italian Royal House Amedeo di Savoia

The XXXI edition (2007-2010) was published in four volumes in December 2010 on the occasion of the 150th anniversary of the Unification of Italy and was awarded the Golden Shield (Italian: Scudo d'Oro) prize of the Centre for Heraldic Studies (Italian: Centro per gli Studi Araldici). The XXXII edition, covering the years 2011-2014, was published in December 2014 and presented on 7 February 2015 at the Pontifical Athenaeum Regina Apostolorum and at the Campidoglio, in the hall of the Protomoteca. The XXXIII edition of 2015-2020, in two volumes of 5851 pages plus tables and index, was printed in early 2021. It contains, in addition to genealogical updates of more than 11000 families, unpublished documents on the dynastic succession in the deposed Houses of Savoy, Bourbon Two Sicilies, Bourbon Parma and Habsburg Lorraine (the latter developed in a separate treatise).

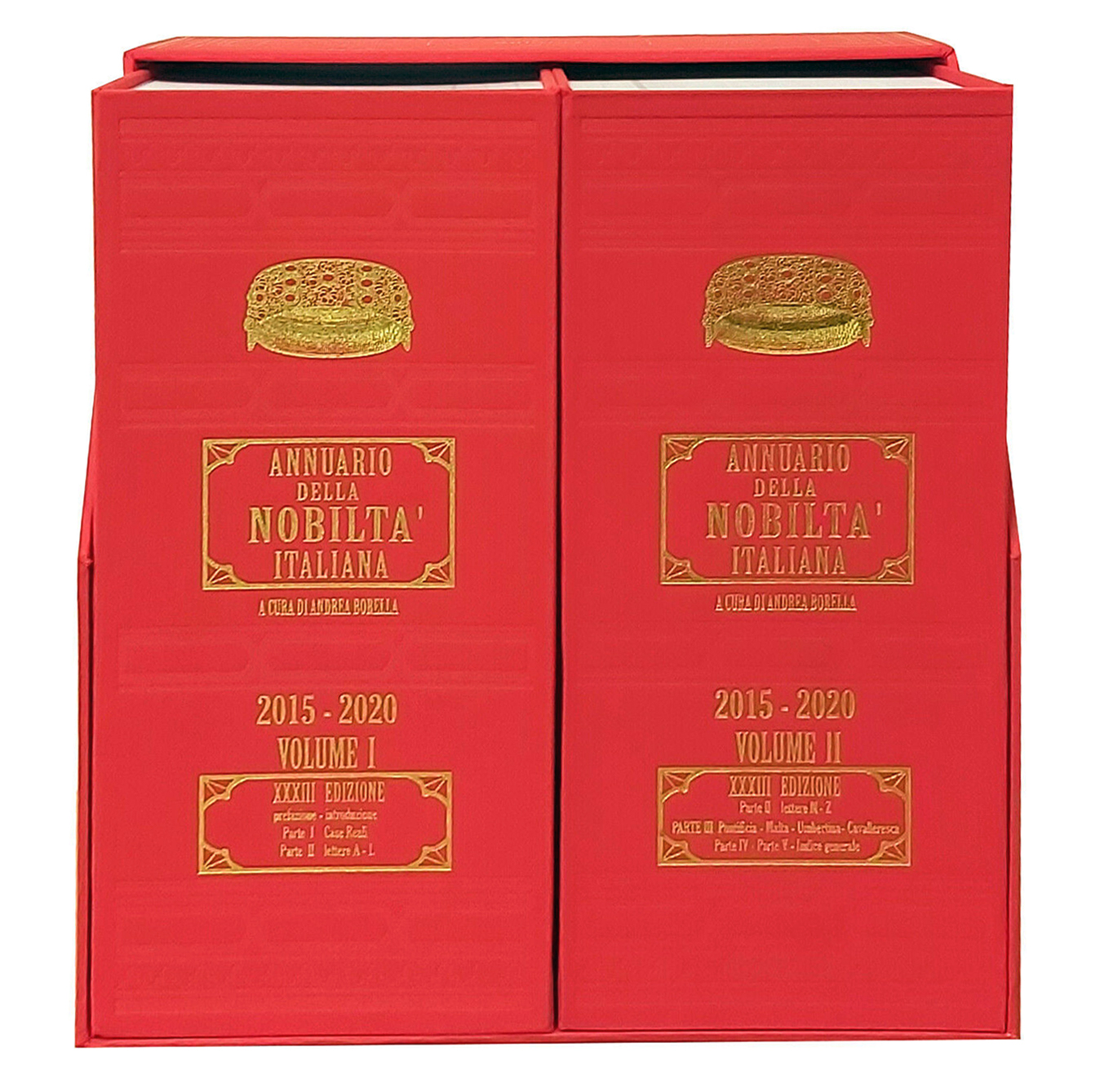
Spine of the XXXIII edition of the "Annuario della Nobiltà italiana" 2015-2020.

=== Subdivisions ===
Like the first series, the second series is divided into parts. The second series is initially divided into 7 main parts, each of which contains the records of the following categories of families, classified according to the noble distinctions they have acquired:

1. Papal and Sacred College and Royal Houses, formerly sovereign in the pre-unitary Italian States;
2. Families listed in the Libro d'oro della nobiltà italiana (official register) and in the official lists of nobility of 1921 and 1936 (for a total of about 12000 families);
3. Families whose nobility is recognised by the Sovereign Military Order of Malta;
4. Families recognised as noble before the Unification of Italy, either by the Pope or others.
5. Ancient families in possession of a coat of arms and with life more nobilium;
6. Families created noble, titled or patrician by the Republic of San Marino;
7. Italian families recognised as noble by foreign sovereigns after 1948 or who have been granted coats of arms abroad.

In the XXXI edition of 2007-2010 a different criterion of classification is applied:

1. Part I (Volume I): families already sovereign in the ancient Italian States and the Royal House of Italy;
2. Part II (Volumes I: A-G; II: H-Z): noble families registered in the official lists of the Kingdom of Italy (1861-1946), divided into Volume I (surnames A-G) and Volume II (surnames H-Z);
3. Part III (Volume III): noble families divided into:
  - families ennobled by Popes after 1870;
  - Families ennobled by the Grand Master of the Sovereign Military Order of Malta or admitted to the same order;
  - Families ennobled by the deposed King of Italy Umberto II of Italy after 1947
  - Families admitted to orders of chivalry after the collapse of Kingdom of Italy with proof of nobility;
4. Part IV (Volume III): families decorated with "generous nobility" (possession of a fief for 2 centuries), mainly from the pre-unitary states, but not recognised by the Kingdom of Italy and therefore not included in the previous parts;
5. Part V (Volume IV): Italian 'notable' families, i.e. those lineages that possessed a coat of arms and led a 'more nobilium' life, but were not formally recognised as noble.

In the XXXIII edition of the years 2015-2020, published in March 2021, the dynastic law treatises on the deposed royal houses are resumed and expanded, also with the publication of unpublished documents, especially for the Habsburgs Lorraine, Savoy and Bourbon. This edition is presented at the Chamber of Deputies in Rome on 23 June 2023.

=== Awards ===
Among the various awards received from genealogical associations and royal houses, in 2011 the journal received the 'Scudo d'oro' award from the Centre for Heraldic Studies for the XXXI edition of the four-volume 'Annuario della nobiltà italiana' (Yearbook of Italian Nobility), published on the occasion of the 150th anniversary of the Unification of Italy.

== Gallery ==
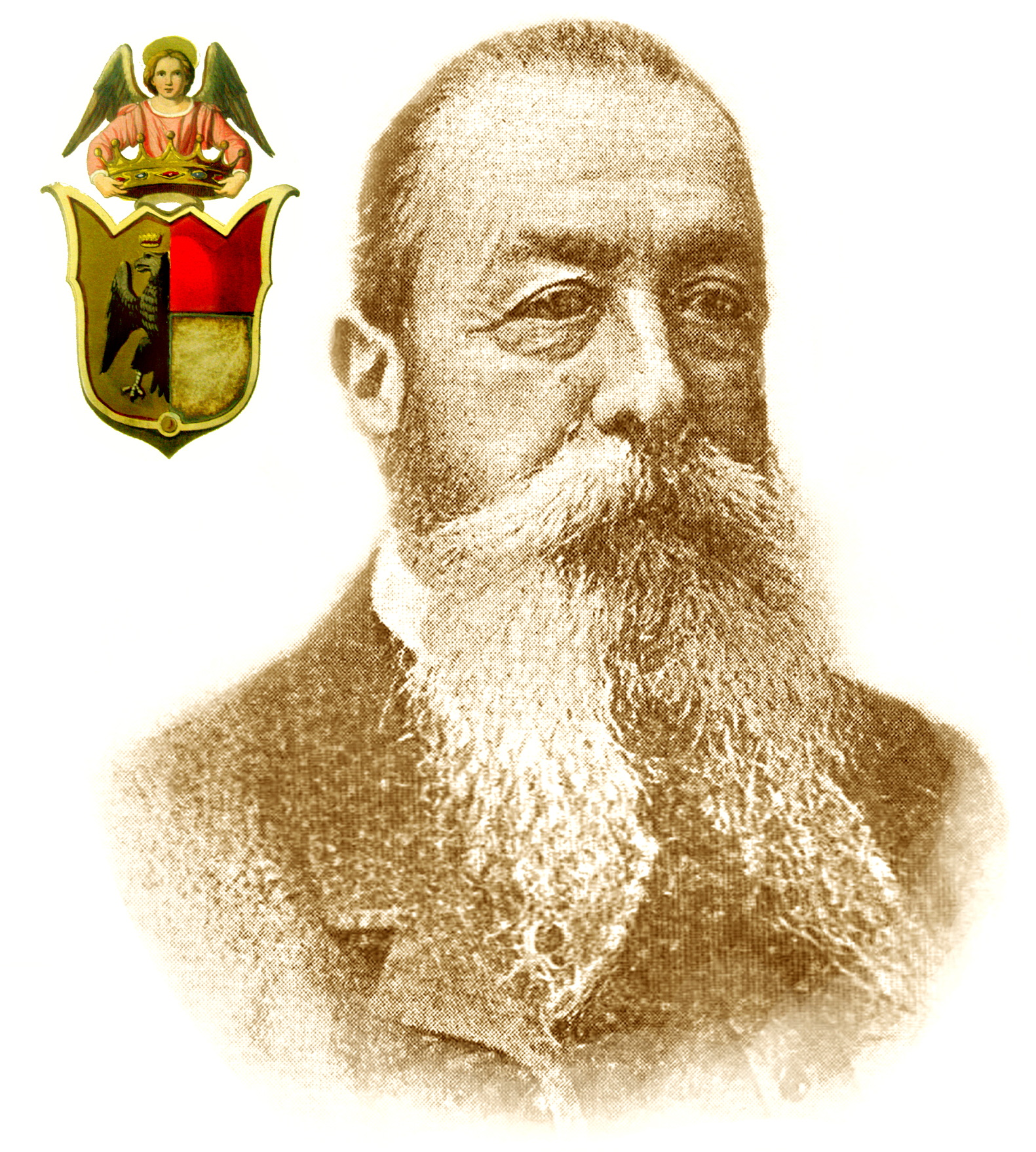
count Walfredo della Gherardesca (1826-1892), second President of Annuario della nobiltà italiana from 1888 to 1892 year.

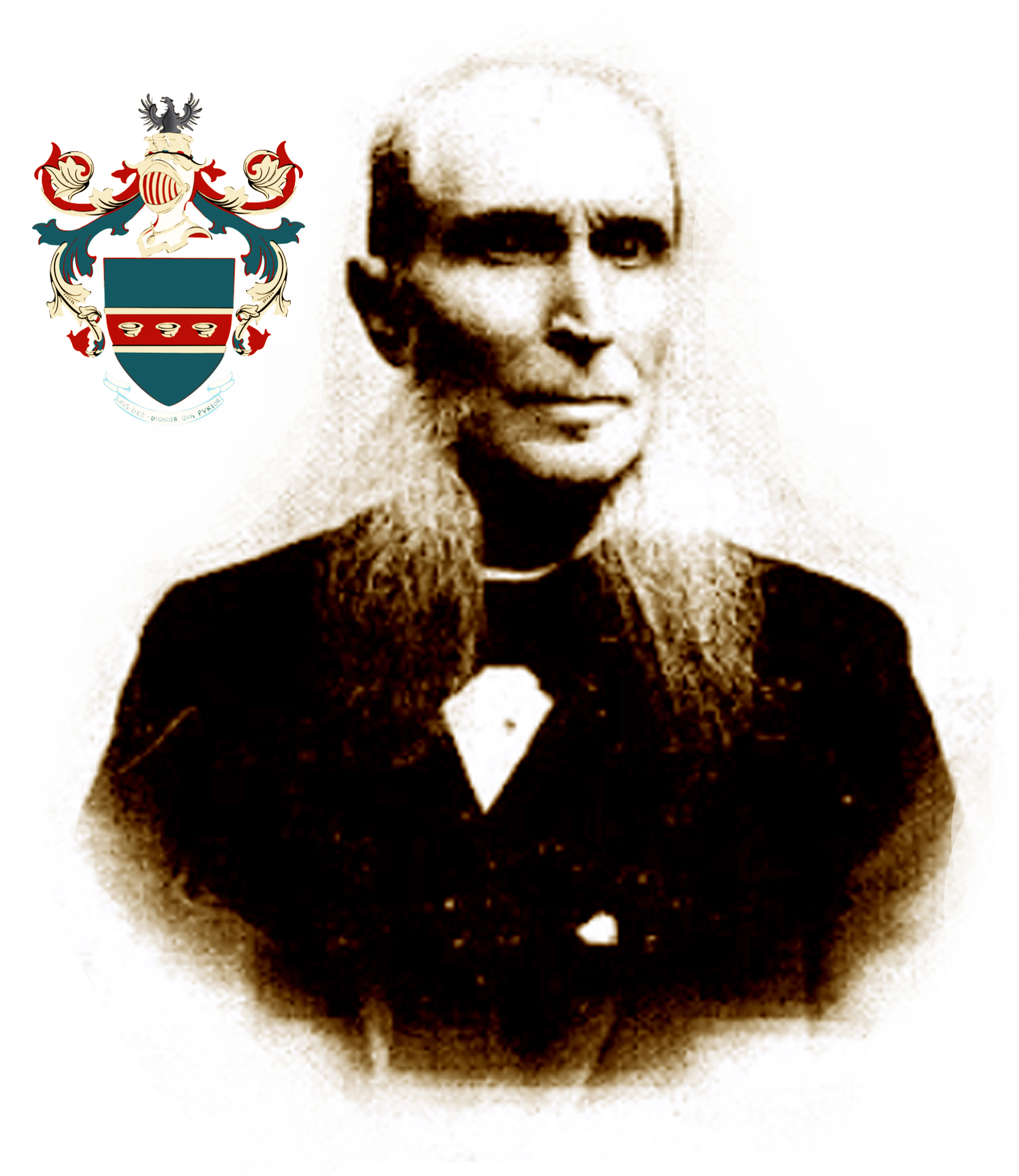
baron Filippo Bacile di Castiglione (1827-1911), first Vice-President Annuario della nobiltà italiana from 1879 to 1905.

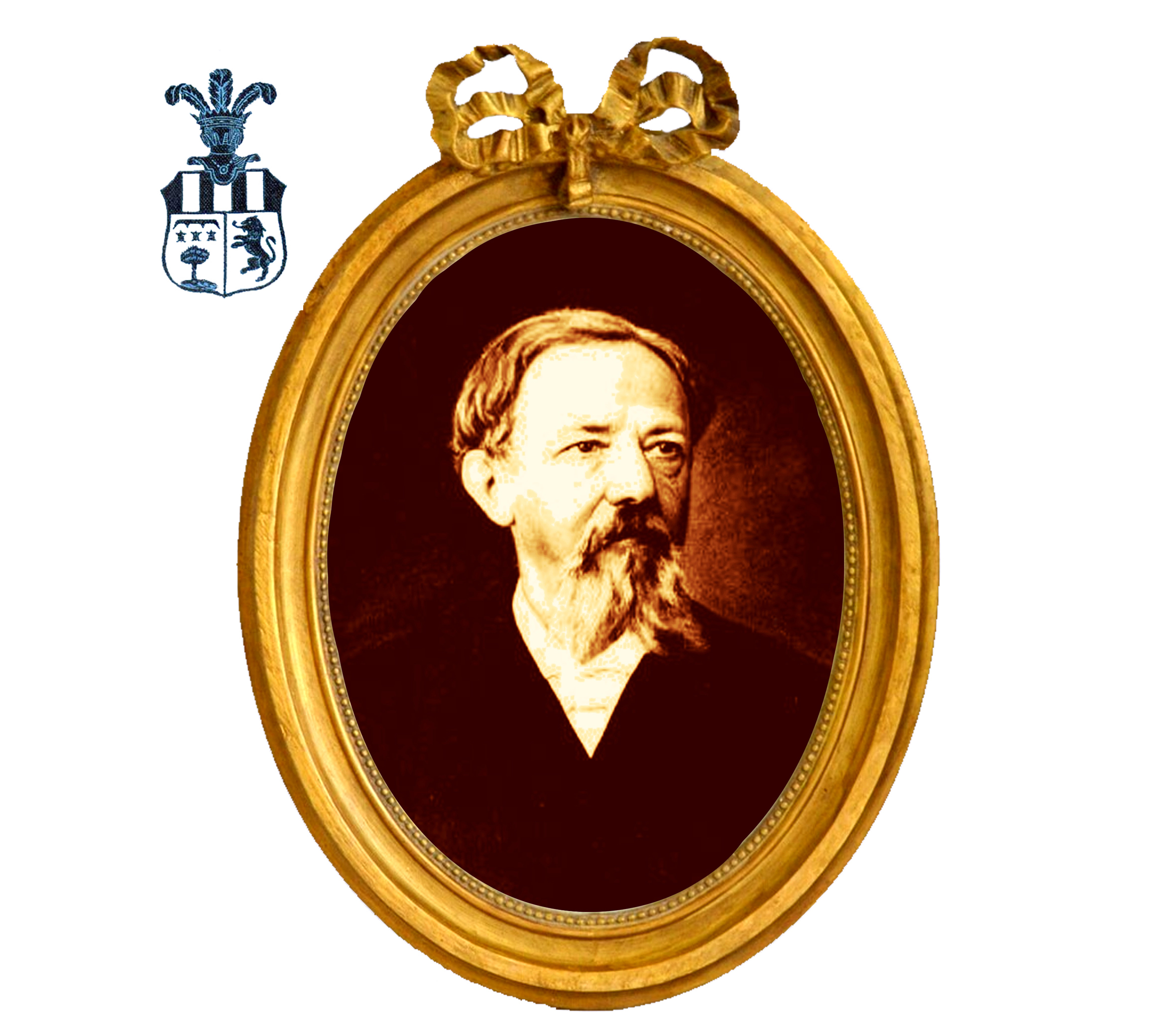
Felice Tribolati (1834-1898), second Vice-President of Annuario della nobiltà italiana from 1882 to 1898.

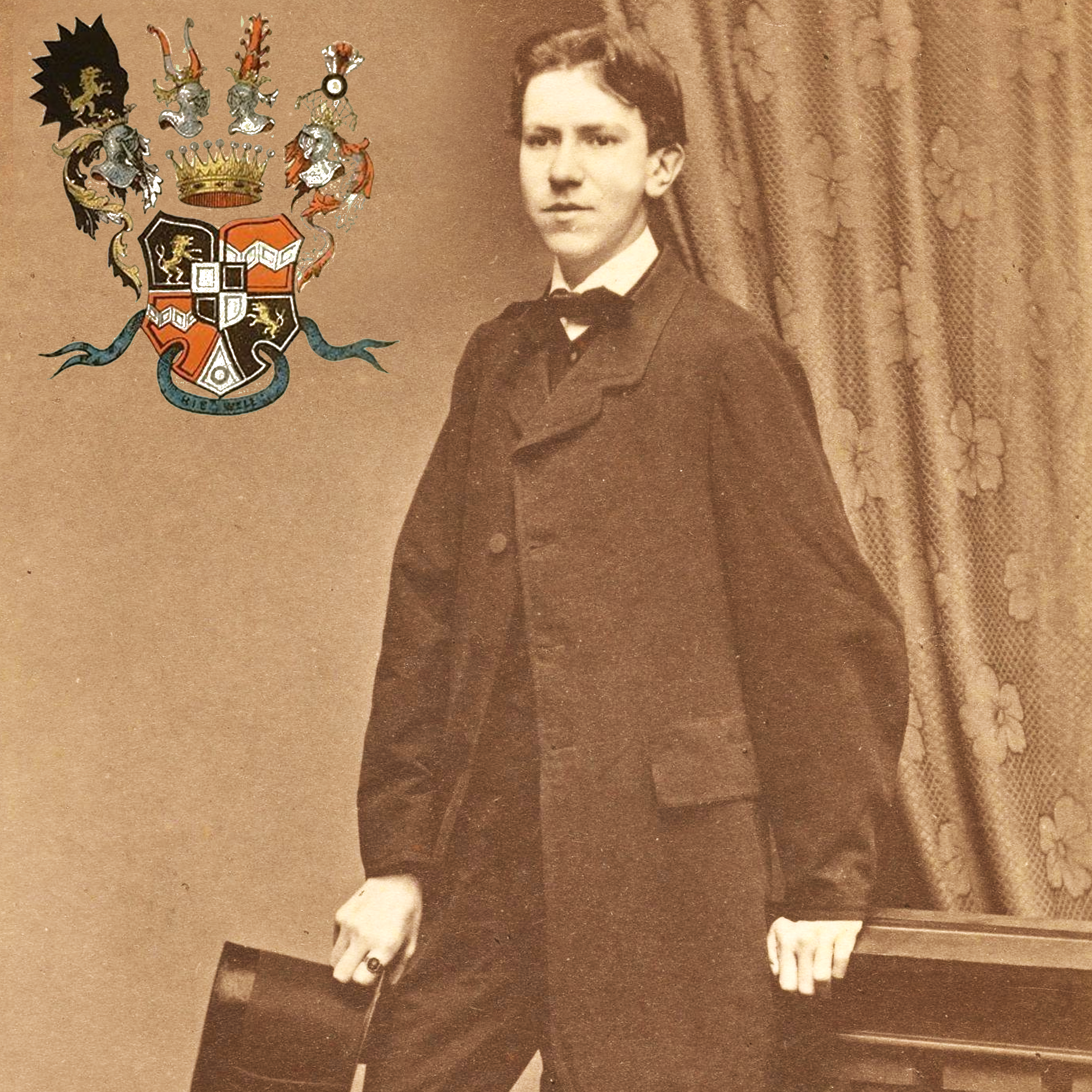
count Enrico Welsperg, Third Vice-President of Annuario della nobiltà italiana from 1898 to 1905.

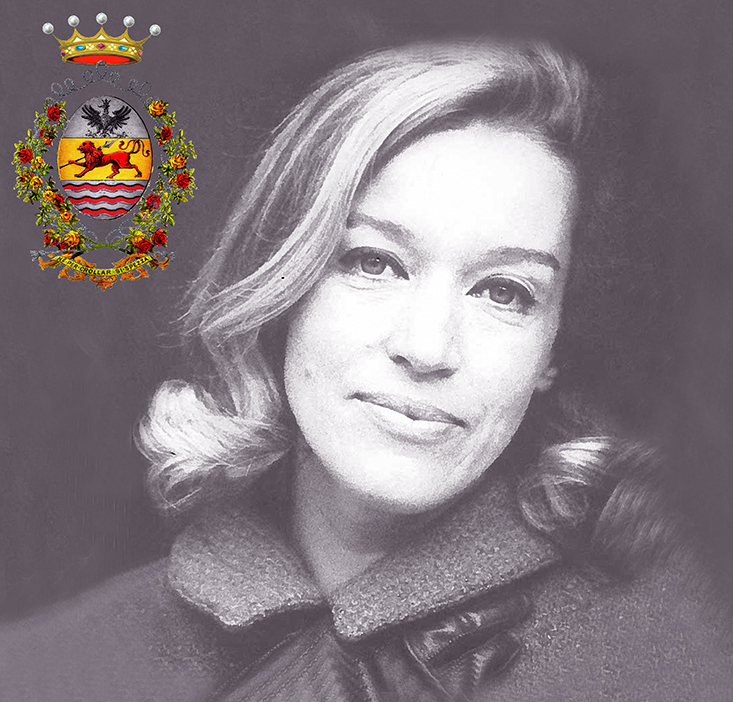
noble Onda di Crollalanza (1925-2006), onorary chairwoman of Annuario della nobiltà italiana from 2000 until 2006 year.

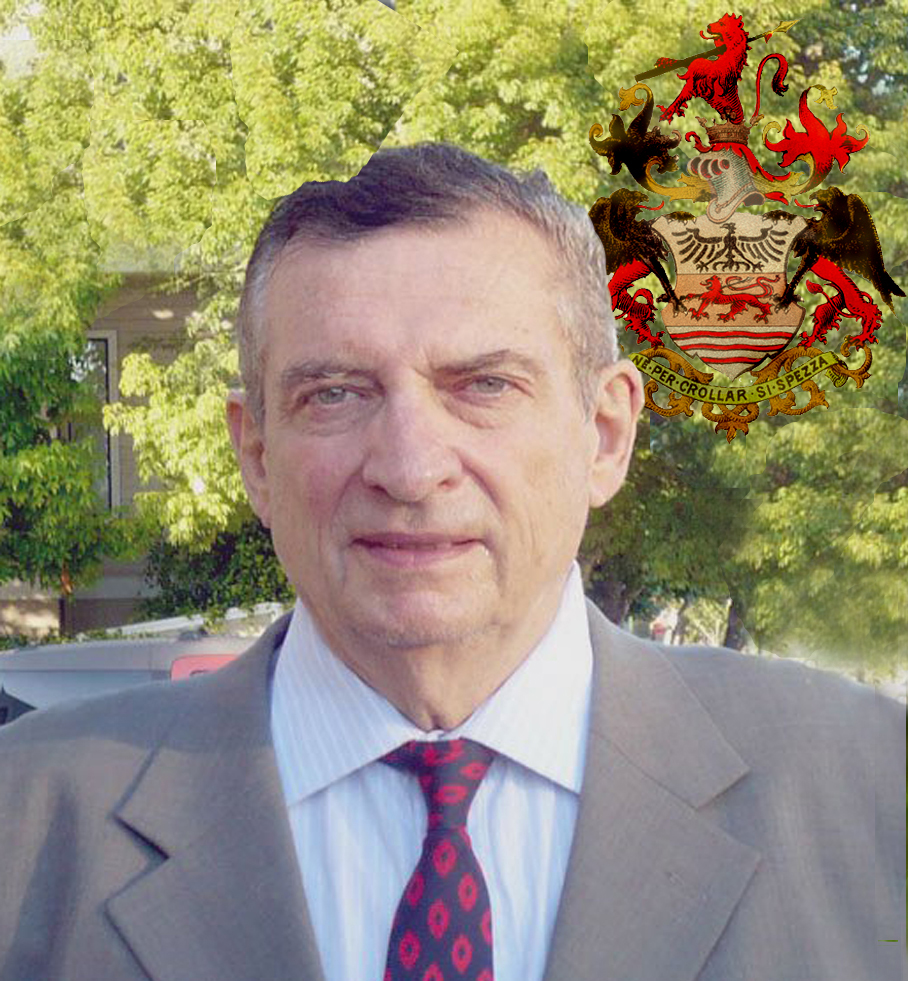
noble Araldo di Crollalanza (1935-2014), onorary president of Annuario della nobiltà italiana from 2006 to 2014.

== See also ==
- Giovan Battista di Crollalanza
- Nobility
- peerage
- Libro d'Oro della Nobiltà italiana (private publication)

== Bibliography ==
- Andrea Borella (a cura di), Annuario della nobiltà italiana, edizione XXVIII (2000) - XXXIII (2015-2020)
- Giovanni Battista di Crollalanza (a cura di), Annuario della nobiltà italiana, edizione I (1879) - XIV
- Goffredo di Crollalanza (a cura di), Annuario della nobiltà italiana, edizione XV - XXVII
- Giovan Battista di Crollalanza, Storia militare di Francia dell'Antico e Medio Evo opera originale (1100-1285), Vol. 2, Firenze, 1861
- Carlo Padiglione, Biografia del cavaliere G.B. Crollalanza, Borgomanero, 1874
- Gregorio e Francesco Laureani, Cenni biografici del cav. Giambattista Crollalanza, Busto Arsizio, 1870
- Luigi Rangoni Machiavelli, voce Crollalanza, in: Enciclopedia italiana di scienze, lettere ed arti, Istituto Giovanni Treccani, Roma, 1929 sgg.
- Annuario della Nobiltà Italiana, 2000, XXVIII edizione, 2000, Teglio
- Annuario della Nobiltà Italiana, 2001-2002, XXIX edizione, 2002, Teglio
- Annuario della Nobiltà Italiana, 2003-2006, XXX edizione (edizione monumentale), 2006, Teglio, S.A.G.I., ISBN 978-88-95231-09-9
- Annuario della Nobiltà Italiana, 2007-2010, XXXI edizione commemorativa per i 150 anni dell'Unità d'Italia, 2010, Teglio, S.A.G.I., ISBN 978-88-95231-00-6
- Annuario della nobiltà italiana, 2011-2014, XXXII edizione, 2014, S.A.G.I., Teglio, ISBN 978-88-95231-08-2
- Annuario della nobiltà italiana, 2015-2020 XXXIII edizione, Teglio, ISBN 978-88-942861-0-6
- Maurizio Bettoja: Riflessione e commento alla XXX edizione dell'Annuario della nobiltà italiana Società Italiana di Studi Araldici S.I.S.A., 2008, Torino, pages 1–11
- Gian Carlo Jocteau: Nobili e nobiltà nell'Italia unita, Laterza Bari, 1997
