= Great Officers of State (disambiguation) =

The Great Officers of State are traditional ministers of a certain Crown who either inherit their positions or are appointed to exercise certain largely ceremonial functions or to operate as members of the government.

Great Officers of State may also refer to:

- Great Officers of the Crown of France
- Great Officers of the Realm in Sweden
- Great Officers of State in the United Kingdom (England and Scotland)
