= Giovanni Battista Orsenigo =

Italian monk and dentist (1837–1904)

Giovanni Battista Orsenigo (1837–1904) was an Italian monk from a family of thirteen, although four of his siblings did not reach adulthood. He had several jobs before realizing his vocation and becoming a monk/dentist among the Brothers Hospitallers of Saint John of God. He is most known for being in the Guinness Book of Records as the most dedicated dentist. In total he collected 2,000,744 of the teeth he extracted.

== Bibliography ==
- Gabriele Russotto, San Giovanni di Dio e il suo ordine ospedaliero, Edizioni dell'Ufficio Formazione e Studi dei Fatebenefratelli, Roma 1969, vol. 2, pp. 181–184.
