= Libro d'Oro della Nobiltà italiana (official register) =

Public and official Italian nobility register

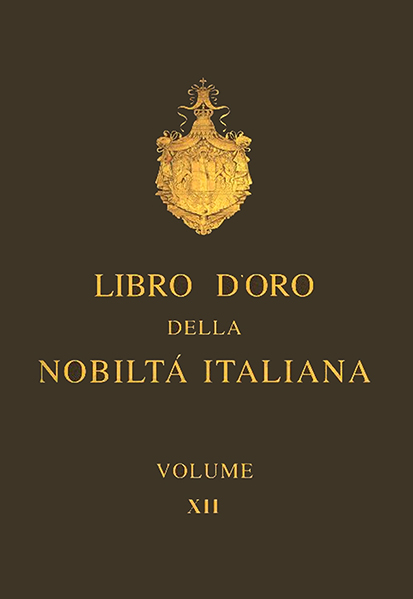
Cover of the official Italian register of nobility Libro d'Oro della Nobiltà italiana

The Libro d'oro della Nobiltà italiana is a public and official register compiled both during the Regno d'Italia and in the Italian Republic before 1962. It contains the list of families registered by a "provision of Grace" (motu proprio of the King, i.e. a concession) or justice (recognition of an ancient noble title by the Consulta Araldica). Each family is treated on one or more pages, which include: country of origin, habitual residence of the family, noble titles and attributes with an indication of the origin and succession of noble titles, royal and governmental regulations, blazons and a part of the documented genealogy.

This first and most important official nobiliary register of the Kingdom of Italy should not be confused with Libro d'Oro della Nobiltà italiana of the same name, which are instead only private works still published both in Rome and Savigliano, a small town near Cuneo.

== Description ==
The register is kept in the Archivio Centrale dello Stato (Central Archives of the Italian State), in Rome, compiled by the Consulta Araldica of the Regno d'Italia, a state body established in 1869 at the Ministry of the Interior.

For the annotation of the names of direct descendants, the presentation of civil status documents was sufficient; collaterals, as long as the connection to the progenitor took place after the ennobling of the family, had to present the necessary civil status documentation, but the consent of the person (or his successors, if deceased) who had obtained the first registration of the family was also required. Otherwise, and this was also the most frequent case for tax reasons, one had to apply ‘’ex novo‘’ for a decree of recognition. From this it follows that registration in the ‘’Libro d'Oro‘’ was a simple administrative act and against its provisions it was possible to appeal to the Consiglio di Stato on grounds of legitimacy.

To obtain inscription in the register 'Libro d'Oro' (Golden Book), in addition to submitting an application, one had to have paid the relative administrative fees, obtaining registration at the Corte dei Conti, after which the relative decree was sent within the terms of law. Simply belonging to a noble family was not the only requisite, but also the positive opinion of Prefetto (Prefect, as local representative of the central government), authorities that had consulted the police and various other information.

Royal Decree no. 1990 of 7 September 1933 provided norms on the compilation of the "Libro d'Oro della Nobiltà italiana" (Golden Book of Italian nobility) and required citizens listed in the "Elenco Ufficiale nobiliare" to apply, after specific recognition, for registration in said Book.

It is structured in many handwritten and bound volumes, divided into two series and today kept at the Archivio Centrale dello Stato in Rome-EUR:

- Libro d'oro della nobiltà italiana, old series, in 11 volumes;
- Libro d'oro della nobiltà italiana, new series, in 30 volumes.

From the beginning of the Italian Republic, noble titles are not recognised and the Consulta Araldica of the Regno d'Italia ceased to function. This register was obviously no longer updated.

== The Official Lists of Nobility of the Kingdom of Italy ==
Before the unification of Italy, many states and cities had official lists of families with noble titles, often called 'Libro d'oro'. The Libro d'Oro (The Golden Book), originally compiled between 1315 and 1797, is the formal directory of nobles in the Republic of Venice (including the Ionian Islands). In the reformed Republic of Genoa of 1576, the Genoese Libro d'Oro, which had been closed in 1528, was reopened to admit new blood. In the oligarchic Republic of Venice the series of restrictions to eligibility for membership in the Great Council that began in 1297 with the decreed Serrata del Maggior Consiglio, or closing of the Great Council, resulted in 1315 in the compiling of a directory of members of eligible families, the Libro d'Oro or "Golden Book". The book was permanently closed in 1797, with the fall of the Venetian Republic. In addition to the Libro d'oro of Venice, such books had existed in many of the Italian states and cities before the unification of Italy. For example, the Libro d'Oro of Murano, the glass-making island in the Venetian Lagoon, was instituted in 1602, and from 1605 the heads of the Council of Ten granted the title cittadino di Murano to those heads of families born on the island or resident there for at least twenty-five years. A Libro d'Oro was also compiled on each of the Venetian Ionian Islands as a nobiliary of the members of local Community Councils (Zante 1542, Corfu 1572 and Cephalonia 1593). After the Ionian Islands were conquered and annexed by Napoleon Bonaparte in 1797, the Libro d'Oro was ceremoniously burned.

== "Consulta Araldica" (Heraldic Council) ==
The "Consulta Araldica" (Heraldic Council) was established to prevent abuses and usurpations in the maintenance of existing noble titles in the old preunitarian Italian States, and was charged with keeping a Register of Noble Titles, in which official registration was compulsory in order to be entitled to public attribution of the title. In 1889, a list was drawn up of the families that had received decrees of concession or recognition of noble titles after the Unification of Italy, and at the same time, 14 regional lists were drawn up of the families already registered in the official lists of the old preunitarian Italian States.

In 1896, the "Libro d'oro della nobiltà italiana", in which families who had received royal decrees conferring, confirming or renewing a noble title, or royal or ministerial decrees recognising their noble title, were entered.

In 1921, the Elenco Ufficiale delle Famiglie nobili e titolate del Regno d'Italia (Official List of the Noble and Titled Families of the Kingdom of Italy) was approved: the list included all the families already entered in the regional registers, but an asterisk marked those that had been entered in the Golden Book of the Italian Nobility by royal or ministerial decree.

In 1933, a second Elenco Ufficiale della Nobiltà italiana (Official List of the Italian Nobility) was approved, to which a list of Predicate of Peerage was also annexed.

Those registered in the "Elenchi Ufficiali Nobiliari italiani" (Official Italian Nobiliary Lists) (1921-1933 and Suppl. 1934–36), if they did not present the documents for registration in the Libro d'Oro della Nobiltà italiana within three years, were deleted from it: in the 1933 list, many families that were not extinct in the list published in 1921 disappeared.

== After the Second World War and the rise of the Italian Republic ==
Following the Second World War and the decision by a referendum to abolish the monarchy, the new Italian Republic officially ended its recognition of titles and hereditary honours in its new constitution of Italy, so ceased to maintain the Consulta Araldica, an official government body regulating the nobility which had been a department of the Ministry of the Interior. No titles are now recognized. Only those families bearing titles before 28 October 1922 (i.e. before the rise to power of Fascism) were permitted to use predicates of such titles as a part of their names. The Consulta heraldica was formally suppressed only in 2010, in 1948, after the entry into force of the 'XIV Disposizioni transitorie e finali della Costituzione italiana' (Transitional and Final Provisions of the Constitution of the Italian Republic), with which the republican state sanctioned the non-legal recognition of noble titles. These laws did not apply to the Papal nobility of Rome, insofar as their titles had been created by the Pope, when he was a sovereign head of state of the Papal States (i.e. until the Capture of Rome on 20 September 1870). After a period of uncertainty, the Italian aristocracy continued to use their titles in the same way as they had in previous centuries.

The "Libro d'Oro della Nobiltà Italiana" is, to date, an official manuscript register in 41 volumes and has never been published.

== Bibliography ==
- Gian Carlo Jocteau, Nobili e nobiltà nell'Italia unita, Laterza (collana Quadrante Laterza) 1997.
- Elenco storico della nobiltà italiana (compilato in conformità dei decreti e delle lettere patenti originali e sugli atti ufficiali di archivio della Consulta araldica dello Stato italiano), Sovrano militare ordine di Malta, Tipografia Poliglotta Vaticana, Roma 1960.
- Walter Pagnotta, Riconoscimenti di predicati italiani e di titoli nobiliari pontifici nella Repubblica Italiana (repertorio), Ministero per i beni culturali e ambientali - Ufficio centrale per i beni archivistici, Istituto Poligrafico e Zecca dello Stato, Roma 1997 (serie: Pubblicazioni degli archivi di stato. Sussidi, 9) ISBN 88-7125-123-7.

== See also ==
- Consulta araldica
- Nobility of Italy

== Sources ==
- Heraldry in Italy at Heraldica (in English). Retrieved 11 May 2007
- Explanation of Italian noble rank at Regalis (in English. Retrieved 8 July 2007
