= Almanach de Bruxelles =

Defunct French social register

The Almanach de Bruxelles was a French social register that listed royal and noble dynasties of Europe. It was established in 1918 during the First World War to compete against the prominent German Almanach de Gotha.

== See also ==
- Almanach de Gotha
