= Giovanni Battista Bellandi =

Italian sculptor

Giovanni Battista Bellandi (early 16th century) was an Italian sculptor, active in Milan for its elaborately decorated Cathedral.
