= Libro d'Oro della Nobiltà italiana (private publication) =

Italian publication

The Libro d'oro della Nobiltà italiana (Golden Book of Italian Nobility) is a private, unofficial publication in Italian containing anagraphic and biographical data of certain Italian noble and notable families published at irregular intervals under the auspices of the Collegio Araldico – Istituto araldico romano (College of Heraldry – Heraldic Institute of Rome) until 2010 it was published by Roberto Colonnello Editore, owned by Roberto Colonnello Bertini Frassoni, then hereditary Secretary General of the Association, and since 2014 it has been published by Ettore Gallelli, who formally took it over by registering it with the General Public Office for works protected by copyright, under the supervision of the Italian Ministry of Culture (art. 103 L. 633/1941).

This is one of several publications on the subject on the book market, and should not be confused with the Libro d'Oro della Nobiltà italiana compiled by the Consulta Araldica (Heraldic Council) of the Kingdom of Italy.

== History ==
After the end of the first series of the Annuario della Nobiltà Italiana in 1905, the first edition of the "Libro d'Oro della Nobiltà" published by the Collegio Araldico, at the instigation of the secretary of the same association Carlo Augusto Bertini, later Bertini Frassoni, former contributor to the first series of the Annuario della Nobiltà Italiana, with subsequent editions every two or three years until the 1930s, when the Presidency of the Italian Council of Ministers of the Kingdom of Italy issued a decree prohibiting the use of the name 'Libro d'oro', as it was the same as that of an official state register and this risked confusing readers. The ban is still in force and has not been lifted.

The name change marked the end of the first series, which ended in 1932 with the 8th edition.

The editions of 1933–36 (printed in 1935) and 1937–39 (printed in 1939) were entitled "Libro della Nobiltà italiana" (Book of the Italian nobility), removing the forbidden word d'oro (gold) from the title, and constituted the second series of the publication.

However, after a long interruption in publication, between 1939 and 1949, the series resumed publication under the same name as the official document, again at irregular intervals and without government authorisation to use the same title as an official register, giving rise to the third series with the 10th edition.

In 1957 the founder Carlo Augusto Bertini Frassoni died and he was succeeded in the editorship of the Libro d'Oro and the Rivista Araldica and in the position of general secretary of the "Collegio Araldico" by his son, Raoul Bertini Frassoni who directed it until his death in 1974 year. He was succeeded by his grandson, and adopted son, Roberto Colonnello Bertini Frassoni, who edited the 16th edition (1973–1976).

In 2005, Roberto Colonnello Bertini Frassoni, 'in his own name and as the owner of the individual firm of the same name' and also in his capacity as Segretario generale del Collegio Araldico (Secretary General of the Heraldic College), sued Andrea Borella complaining that the defendant, in his capacity as editor and publisher of the 'new series' of the 'Annuario della Nobiltà italiana' (Yearbook of the Italian Nobility), would unlawfully have extracted and reused for that editorial activity a substantial part of the contents of the "Libro d'Oro della Nobiltà italiana (Golden Book of the Italian Nobility) and also slavishly copied numerous parts of the Golden Book, thereby infringing the plaintiff's sui generis right as producer of the database and, at the same time, the copyright of the publication in question as a literary work. The Secretary General of the Collegio Araldico, Roberto Colonnello, asked the Court to establish these alleged infringements and to issue the necessary injunctions and sanctions, including the destruction of the all printed copies and the withdrawal of the Annuario from the book market. The Court of Milan rejected the requests of the Secretary General of the Collegio Araldico, Roberto Colonnello, with judgment no. 12659 of 23 June – 28 October 2008. The Secretary General of the Collegio Araldico, Roberto Colonnello, appealed against the first instance decision and asked for it to be reviewed. The second verdict, issued by Milan Court of Appeal, was very unfavourable to Colonnello and the Collegio Araldico. The Court of Appeal upheld the decision of the first instance and ordered Colonnello/Secretary of the Collegio Araldico to pay all the costs of the trial. The judgment has been notified and become final in mid-2012. The verdict was followed by a series of events which, in less than two years, led to the closure of the Heraldic College and to Colonnello Bertini Frassoni's resignation from the management of the Golden Book of the Nobility.

At the beginning of 2014 year Colonnello Bertini Frassoni, Secretary of the Araldico College, announced the dissolution of this association, founded a century before, and consequently the suspension of the publication of the Golden Book of the Nobility, the last edition of which had been published under his direction four years earlier, in 2010 (XXIV edition of the third series).

== First series of the periodical Golden Book of the Nobility (1910–1932) (I – X edition) ==
In the first series of this periodical, about 3000.00 different families were published: they represent only a very small part of the families registered in the official Italian nobility lists (about 12.000.00). In the second part of the books were published some families decorated with titles given by the Popes (after 1870), some titled families of the Republic of San Marino not recognised by the Kingdom of Italy and families of heterogeneous origin, including some fake noble families.

== Second series (1933–1939) (XI – XII edition) ==
The second series of the work, whose title changed to Book of the Italian Nobility, published essentially the same families as in the first series.

== Third series (1940–2010) (XIII – XXIV edition) ==
The third series of the work, whose title was again changed to "Libro d'Oro della Nobiltà italiana" (Golden Book of the Italian Nobility), published essentially the same families as the first and second series. Until the death of Raul Bertini Frassoni in 1974, the families registered in the official lists of the Italian nobility were separated from those whose nobility derived from other sources. In the second part, some important families, i.e. those who were not noble but possessed the coat of arms of the bourgeoisie, were included, as well as other families.

The first series of the book included almost 1,900 families covered in detail while the website of the Heraldic College, the apparent publisher of the work, proclaimed the publication of some 2500 noble families, for each of which there should have been a brief historical note, the updated family status and the black and white coat of arms. Despite what is stated on the website and in these books, these are only a small part of the families registered in the official lists of the Kingdom of Italy, i.e. those who have sent their updated personal data to the Heraldic College by following the proposal to purchase the work; to these must be added some families recognised by the Association of the Corpo della Nobiltà Italiana, by the Sovereign Military Order of Malta or by the Republic of San Marino. As stated in the subscription and participation forms for the work, inclusion of a family was contingent upon the family itself sending data and subscribing with advance payment of at least one copy: this did not happen in other peerage and genealogical repertoires Furthermore, since the insertion and periodic updating of the data is done by the families themselves the current list does not respect the criteria set out in the preface of the work and contains omissions and inaccuracies.

== The two fourth series of the work (2014/2016 – to date) ==
In September 2014, after a four-year break, a new company called 'Libro d'Oro s.r.l.' was established in Turin, with different headquarters and members, to produce a new series of volumes. The aim was to resume publication with a new series entitled 'Libro d'Oro della Nobiltà italiana'. However, the series has already been resumed since 2014 by Ettore Gallelli Editore, with the publication in March 2014 of a new edition of the Golden Book, the XXV since its foundation in 1910 and the creation of a new 'Collegio Araldico' based in Rome, the old one having been dissolved four years earlier. Both editions from the two rival publishers follow the edition numbering of the first series, continuing it. However, the contents of the volumes are very different.

== Features of the two editions of the fourth series ==
by Ettore Gallelli publishing house (2014–): In the first months of 2014, at the insistence of some members of the defunct Collegio Araldico, before located in via Santa Maria dell'Anima, 16, the Ettore Gallelli Publishing House has regularised, in accordance with the law, the title Libro d'Oro della Nobiltà italiana (GOLDEN BOOK OF ITALIAN NOBILITY – NEW CURRENT SERIES), with deposits and variations at the competent legal offices, registering it at the General Public Office for Works Protected by Copyright, thus acquiring all the exclusive editorial, graphic and typographic rights of series and launched the new series at the end of July 2014 with the XXV edition (2015–2019). According to the publisher's website the Gallelli-EDITORE "is therefore the only one authorised by the Italian Ministry of Cultural Heritage and Activities to use the name Libro d'Oro della Nobiltà Italiana – nuova serie corrente,. The families included since the first edition by Gallelli Editore have increased, recovering many families already present in the official lists of the nobility of the Kingdom and previously omitted.

by Libro d'Oro srl (2016–): the 2015–2019 edition was published in June 2016, during an emergency seizure action promoted by the Italian "Avvocatura dello Stato" (State Attorney's Office) About 1997 noble families are published, for each of which there is a brief historical note, the family status – not always updated – and the black and white coat of arms with relative blazonement. For another 3859 families there is a reference to the previous series of the work, which therefore lists, at least by citation, a total of about 5800 Italian noble families: for the vast majority of the families the citation or reference consists only in the insertion of the surname and the main titles of nobility, without any other data. Since the families registered in the official lists of the Kingdom of Italy numbered about 13,267, this means that more than half of the families that would have had the right to appear there, and that are instead listed in the official lists of the Kingdom, never was put in these books serie. The families included in the first and second series published by Libro d'Oro srl therefore represent less than half of the families registered in the official lists of the Kingdom of Italy. In addition, some families recognised by the Private Association of the Corpo della Nobiltà italiana, some families recognised as nobility by the Sovereign Military Order of Malta and others by the Republic of San Marino are published: these families are not included in the official Italian nobility lists and must therefore be deducted from the total number of 5800 families mentioned in the editions. The families added since the first edition published by Libro d'Oro srl have remained essentially the same as those already present in the editions published by Collegio Araldico, and therefore families already present in the official lists of nobility of the Kingdom of Italy are still absent.

== Criticism ==
At present, while Ettore Gallelli Editore, which guaranteed absolute freedom of access from the beginning of the second series, has continued along the path of absolute free of charges of access to the entries in the Golden Book of the Nobility that it publishes, instead the Libro d'Oro srl has introduced a series of charges for those who wish to publish substantial information in the work. Starting with the edition following that of 2016, Libro d'Oro srl has introduced a series of charges for those who wish to publish substantial information in the work, starting with the edition following that of 2016.

Beginning with the XXV edition, 2015–2019, the version of the Golden Book published by Libro d'Oro srl contains numerous paid advertisements from various advertisers, advertisements which are absent in the XXV edition published by Ettore Gallelli Editore. The insertion of advertisements is an operation unknown in modern aristocratic genealogical repertoires.

== Rival publisher disputes ==
The right to continue publishing has been the subject of a legal dispute by a competitor and on other part by Avvocatura dello Stato (State Attorney's Office) from 2015.

== Disputes with the Italian State ==
On 20 September 2018, on the initiative of the Direzione generale degli Archivi di Stato, which is subordinated to the Ministero dei Beni e delle Attività Culturali e del Turismo (Italian Ministry of Cultural Heritage and Activities and Tourism), the UAMI, the Office for Market Harmonisation, now the European Union Intellectual Property Office (EUIPO), based in Alicante (Spain), cancelled the registration of a trademark called Libro d'Oro della Nobiltà italiana, registered by a private association. This trademark was registered in 2014 by Marco Lupis Macedonio Palermo di Santa Margherita, Secretary General of the A.S.N.I. (Historical Association of the Italian Nobility), at that time also member of the Presidential Council of the Collegio Araldico associated with Libro d'Oro srl, through Filippo Bruno (also known as Filippo Bruno di Tornaforte, Filippo Bruno De Brecco), as member of the Council of the A.S.N.I. and partner, effectively registered the trademark 'Libro d'Oro della Nobiltà italiana in the European Register of Trademarks and Patents. This trademark was before transferred in 2015 to Libro d'Oro srl through its CEO Fabrizio Antonielli d'Oulx with a specific act.

== See also ==
- Nobility
- peerage
- Libro d'Oro della Nobiltà italiana (official register)
- Annuario della Nobiltà Italiana
