= Giovan Battista di Crollalanza =

Italian writer (1819–1892)

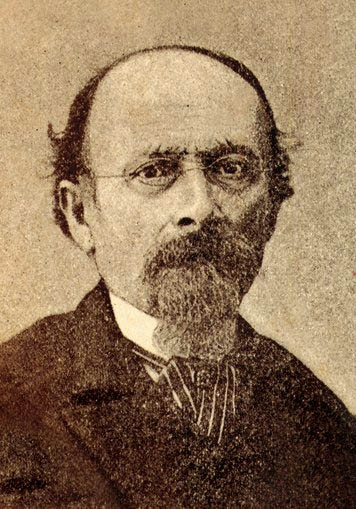
- Born: 19 May 1819; Fermo, Papal States
- Died: 8 March 1892 (aged 72); Pisa, Italy
- Occupation: writer
- Writing career
- Notable works: Annuario della Nobiltà italiana Dizionario storico-blasonico delle famiglie nobili e notabili italiane, estinte e fiorenti

Giovan Battista di Crollalanza (19 May 1819 – 8 March 1892) was an Italian writer. From 1841 he published works on many topics and in several genres, among them histories, plays and poetry. From the 1870s he wrote only on heraldry.

The son of Pietro di Crollalanza, originally from Chiavenna, he was born into an old Milanese family and was a teacher in various high schools. He founded the 'Principe Umberto' boarding school in Carpi and was later headmaster of the national boarding school in Imola. He is remembered for founding the Accademia italiana d'araldica, later Regia Accademia Araldica Italiana, in Pisa, at the beginning of 1875 year.

His printed works made him famous and placed him among the world's leading scholars of heraldry and genealogy of all times. From the second marriage of G.B. di Crollalanza to Teresa Zoli, Goffredo was born in 1855 in Fermo, who succeeded his father as director of the journals.

He is buried in the Suburban Cemetery of Pisa.

His Giornale araldico-genealogico-diplomatico, a monthly periodical of heraldry, started publication in 1873, and ceased only in 1905. His Annuario della Nobiltà Italiana ("yearbook of the Italian nobility"), a genealogical almanach of Italian noble families and the first of its kind in the new Kingdom of Italy, started publication in 1879; as with the Giornale, his sons, first Goffredo, later Aldo, took over publication after his death.

His last work was the Dizionario storico-blasonico delle famiglie nobili e notabili italiane estinte e fiorenti, a heraldic-historical dictionary of the Italian nobility. It was published in Pisa in three volumes between 1886 and 1890.

His major work is the "Annuario della Nobiltà italiana". The "Annuario della Nobiltà italiana" (Yearbook of the Italian Nobility) is a periodical publication dedicated to updating the registration status of Italian families recognised as noble or notable (lines historically possessing a coat of arms and with vita more nobilium) in the Kingdom of Italy and the pre-unitary old italian States.

It was founded in Pisa in 1872 by Giovan Battista di Crollalanza and published there in 1879 after seven years of preparation. The typographical layout was inspired by that of the 19th century editions of the Gotha Almanac. It was published by the Italian Academy of Heraldry (Accademia Italiana di Araldica) in 27 editions until 1905: first in Pisa, then in Bari and finally in Mola di Bari. The first series was edited by Giovan Battista di Crollalanza, from 1878 to 1892,, then by his son, Goffredo di Crollalanza, until 1904 and, after the Goffredo's death in Bari, by half-brother, Aldo di Crollalanza until 1905

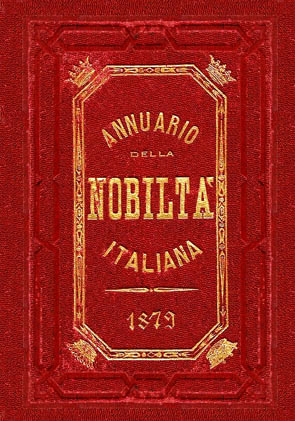
The cover of the first issue of the magazine Annuario della nobiltà italiana, 1st edition, 1879, edited by Giovan Battista di Crollalanza.

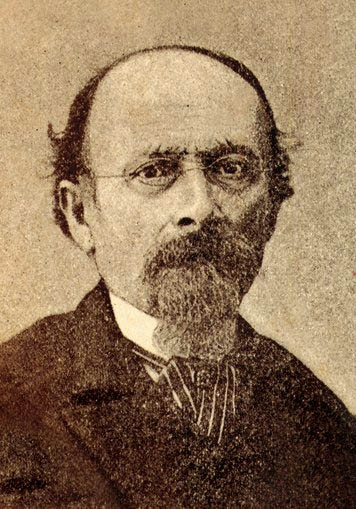
Giovan Battista di Crollalanza, founder of the Annuario della Nobiltà Italiana (Yearbook of Italian Nobility) and its first editor from 1878 to 1892.

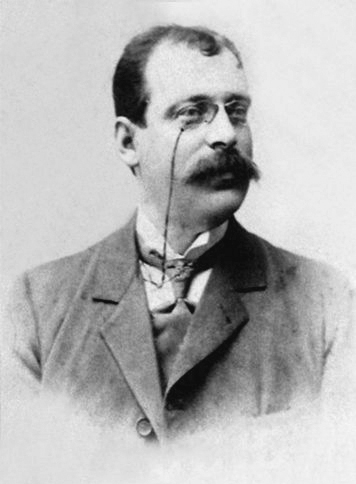
Goffredo di Crollalanza, second editor of the Annuario della Nobiltà Italiana from 1892 to 1904.

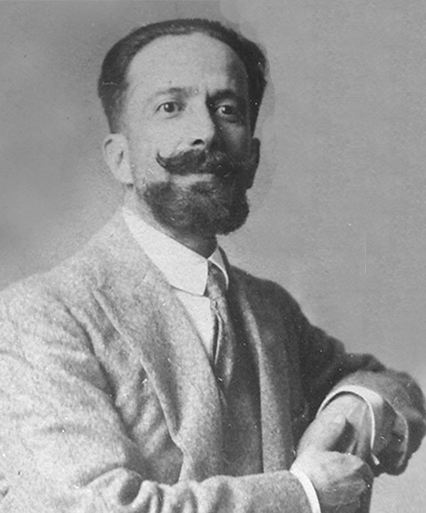
Aldo di Crollalanza, from 1904 to 1905, third editor of the Annuario della Nobiltà Italiana.

In 1998 the new series of the Annuario was founded in Milan, with the publication of the XXVIII edition, in two volumes, first by the S.A.G.I. publishing house (Società Araldica Genealogica Internazionale) and then by the Annuario della Nobiltà Italiana Foundation Trust.

== Bibliography ==
- Giovanni Battista di Crollalanza (a cura di), Annuario della Nobiltà Italiana, edizione I (1879) - XIV
- Goffredo di Crollalanza (a cura di), Annuario della Nobiltà Italiana, edizione XV - XXVII
- Giovan Battista di Crollalanza, Storia militare di Francia dell'Antico e Medio Evo opera originale (1100-1285), Vol. 2, Firenze, 1861
- Carlo Padiglione, Biografia del cavaliere G.B. Crollalanza, Borgomanero, 1874
- Gregorio e Francesco Laureani, Cenni biografici del cav. Giambattista Crollalanza, Busto Arsizio, 1870
- Luigi Rangoni Machiavelli, voce Crollalanza, in: Enciclopedia italiana di scienze, lettere ed arti, Istituto Giovanni Treccani, Roma, 1929 sgg.
