= Social Register =

Index of American socialites

- The cover of the 2018 edition
- Country: United States
- Language: English
- Published: Semi-annual in May and November
- Website: socialregisteronline.com

The Social Register is a semi-annual publication in the United States that indexes the members of American high society. First published in the 1880s by newspaper columnist Louis Keller, it was later acquired by Malcolm Forbes. Since 2014, it has been owned by Christopher Wolf.

It was historically a directory of "old money", well-connected families from the Northeastern United States. In recent years, membership has diversified both in the geography and ethnicity of those it lists.

The Social Register was once of great importance to high society in the United States, but its significance greatly declined toward the end of the 20th century.

== History ==
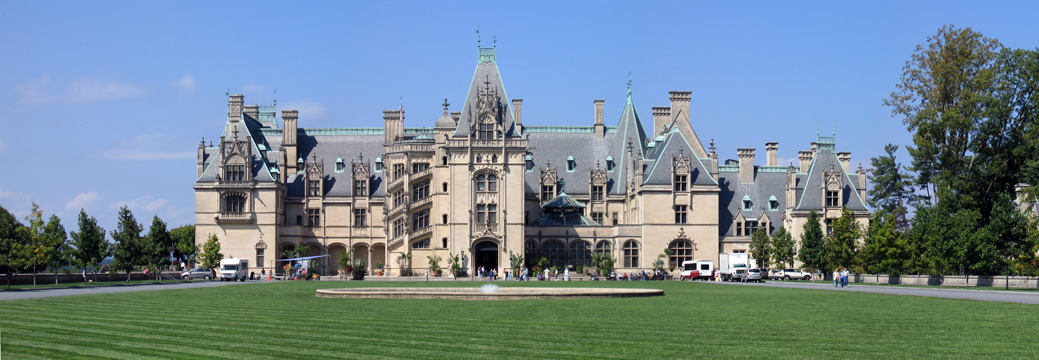
The Social Register was born out of the Gilded Age. Pictured is the Gilded Age mansion Biltmore in Asheville, North Carolina.

In antebellum New York City, the social elite was still a small enough group that no formal method of tracking individuals was necessary. With the advent of the Gilded Age, fashionable ladies began the practice of leaving calling cards at the homes of other notable women whom they visited. These cards would be cataloged into "visiting lists".

In 1887, Louis Keller, a newspaper society columnist and golf promoter, compiled the names of those on the visiting lists of the most prominent New York women into a published volume titled the Social Register. (Note: A Social Register, published by Keller for Newport, Rhode Island, preceded the New York edition by one year.) Inclusion in the registry was done under the supervision of an anonymous advisory committee, composed of some of those listed. This first edition of the Social Register listed more than 5,000 people, most of whom were descended from early American settler families. Joseph Pulitzer was the only Jew to be listed, and people from new money were generally not included. The register was very much a product of Gilded Age excess.

By World War I, the Social Register had expanded into a multi-volume annual which included listings of Society members in 26 U.S. cities. Following Keller's death in 1924, the Social Register passed to several of his heirs. In 1926, a single-city edition cost $6.00 ($109.12 in 2025) and the full set of American editions cost $50.00 ($909.30 in 2025).

A 1973 column in The New York Times about that year's Social Register observed that – unlike males listed – the volume did not list the universities attended by females, unless they were students: "The fact that Mazie Cox is a 1967 graduate of Smith is not mentioned, although pains are taken to indicate that she is a member of the Colony Club, the Daughters of the Cincinnati and the Colonial Dames of America." It also noted that married women who chose to retain their maiden names would be listed under the surname of their husband regardless.

In 1976, the Social Register was acquired by Malcolm Forbes. In 1977, he re-consolidated the various city books back into a single volume for the whole of the United States. A study of the 1988 Social Register found that approximately 10 percent of those listed resided in New York City's Manhattan, with the Upper East Side zip code of 10021 hosting the greatest concentration of listed persons.

The Forbes family retained ownership of the Social Register until 2014, when it was sold to Christopher R. Wolf, a "longtime, listed member".

=== Significance ===
Inclusion in the Social Register has historically been limited to members of "polite society", members of the American upper class and The Establishment, and/or those of "old money" or White Anglo-Saxon Protestant (WASP) families, within the Social Register cities. According to McNamee and Miller: "the acronym WASP... is exemplified by the Social Register, a list of prominent upper-class families first compiled in 1887... There is great continuity across generations among the names included in these volumes."

The cities included are Newport, Rhode Island; Baltimore; Boston; Chicago; Cleveland; Los Angeles; New York; New Jersey; Philadelphia; Pittsburgh; Portland, Oregon; Providence; San Francisco; Seattle; St. Louis; and Washington, D.C.; as well as ones for "Southern Cities". In European countries, similar directories for the perceived upper class, such as Burke's Peerage and Landed Gentry in the United Kingdom, or the Carnet Mondain and High Life in Belgium, have been published for centuries.

According to the Robb Report, inclusion in the Social Register "bespeaks old money, Ivy League, trust funds, privileges of birth, fox hunting, debutante balls, yachting, polo, distinguished forebears, family compounds in the Adirondacks, and a pedigree studded with 19th-century robber barons". In its heyday, the name Social Register became a "kind of shorthand for the Wasp establishment".

However, while inclusion in the Social Register was once so important for members of Society that, according to Brooke Astor, "if someone wasn't listed, you just didn't know them", by the late 1990s its influence had seriously waned. In 2002, journalist Tom Wolfe said that he no longer heard regular reference to the Social Register and opined that the "world of social luster has been so overshadowed by celebrities that it doesn’t have any kick anymore".

== Format ==
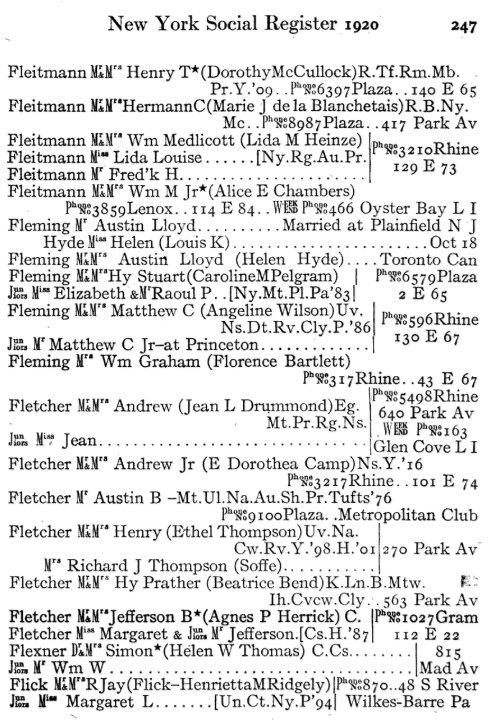
A page from the 1920 edition of the Social Register

Printed editions of The Social Register have long been bound in black with pumpkin-colored lettering.

A person's listing in the Register generally includes contact information, schools attended, and the social and country clubs to which he or she belongs. Many institutions and organizations are cited repeatedly using an extensive system of abbreviations (e.g., "P" for Princeton University, "BtP" for the Bath and Tennis Club of Palm Beach, Florida).

=== Cities with Social Register editions ===
As of 1917:

- New York City
- Washington, D.C.
- Philadelphia and Wilmington (Delaware Valley)
- Chicago
- Boston
- Providence
- St. Louis
- Pittsburgh
- Cleveland
- Cincinnati and Dayton
- Saint Paul and Minneapolis
- San Francisco and Oakland
- Seattle
- Portland (Oregon)
- Baltimore
- Buffalo
- New Orleans
- Southern California, chiefly Los Angeles and Pasadena
- Richmond (Virginia)
- Charleston
- Atlanta
- Savannah
- Augusta (Georgia)

Subsequent years offered guides for Detroit and New Haven, Connecticut.

== Inclusion and exclusion ==
=== Inclusion ===
Traditionally, wealth or fame have been insufficient for inclusion in the Social Register. Kim Kardashian and Gloria Vanderbilt were never listed and Donald Trump, prior to his election as President of the United States, was not included. A 1985 article reported that "enrollees need plenty of green (money), blue (blood), and lily white (reputation)".

Listing in the Social Register has typically been through birth: Children born to a person listed in the Social Register are added. Persons are permitted to apply for inclusion in the Social Register. Such applications require letters of sponsorship from five persons already listed, followed by vetting from the advisory committee. In 1997, a spokesman for the Social Register's then 25-member advisory committee described the criteria by which a person might be added to the directory. The committee, he said, asked themselves, "Would one want to have dinner with this person on a regular basis"?

The President of the United States and Vice President of the United States are, by custom, always added.

=== Exclusion ===
Reasons for removal from the Social Register have traditionally been opaque. In the early 20th century, historian Dixon Wecter observed that those excluded tended to be persons unfavorably reported upon in the press and that, as long as one's private life "keeps out of the [newspaper's] columns" the risk of exclusion was low.

A Social Register spokesman reported, in 1985, that elderly persons who failed to remit the questionnaire sent to listed persons by the register for eleven consecutive years were removed. In addition, someone who married a person who was not themselves listed in the Social Register might have been dropped. On the other hand, a 2018 article indicated that marriage to a listed person would "automatically [bestow] membership on the lesser-pedigreed spouse".

As of 1988, about 35,000 individuals were included in the Social Register. By 2014, this number was reported to be approximately 25,000.

== In popular culture ==
- The 1934 film Social Register presented a fictitious look at the lives of persons on the Social Register.

== See also ==
- Debrett's
- Libro d'Oro
- Powerlist
- Kulavruttanta
- The Four Hundred (1892)

== Primary sources ==
- Social Register Locater 1916, an index showing in which local edition each listed person could be found
- 35 Social Registers from major US cities early 20th century; online free
- The Social Register of Canada, volume I (1958), and subsequent volumes 2 (1959), and 3 (1961), The Social Register of Canada Association. Montreal, Canada
