= Libro d'Oro =

Libro d'Oro may refer to:

- Libro d'Oro della Nobiltà italiana (official register) – a public and official Italian nobility register
- Libro d'Oro della Nobiltà italiana (private publication) – a private publication by the Collegio Araldico on Italian nobility
