= Langtry Manor =

Country house hotel in Dorset, England

Coordinates: 50.72382°N 1.8556°W

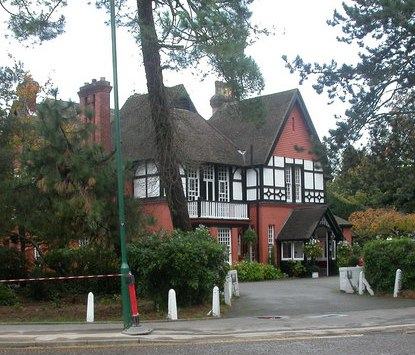
Langtry Manor Hotel

The Langtry Manor (formerly the Red House) is a country house hotel at 26 Derby Road in the East Cliff area of Bournemouth, England. The foundation stone is inscribed "E.L.L. 1877". A residence for 60 years, it was originally known as the "Red House", and after 1937 the "Manor Heath Hotel", before being renamed the Langtry Manor in the late 1970s.

Originally built and owned by widowed women's rights campaigner and temperance activist Emily Langton Langton (1847–1897), after her death the house was sold. In 1938 a new set of owners converted it into a hotel, "Manor Heath Hotel", which advertised it as having been built originally for Lillie Langtry by the Prince of Wales (later Edward VII). However, despite the hotel's claims and local legend, no actual association between Langtry and the house ever existed. Research by Anthony J. Camps, primarily based on research of Jane Ridley for her biography Bertie, and further researched by himself, has proven this. The main source for the story, published by Laura Beatty in her book Lillie Langtry - Manners, masks and morals, was the hotelowner herself.

== Emily Langton Langton and the Red House 1877–1887 ==
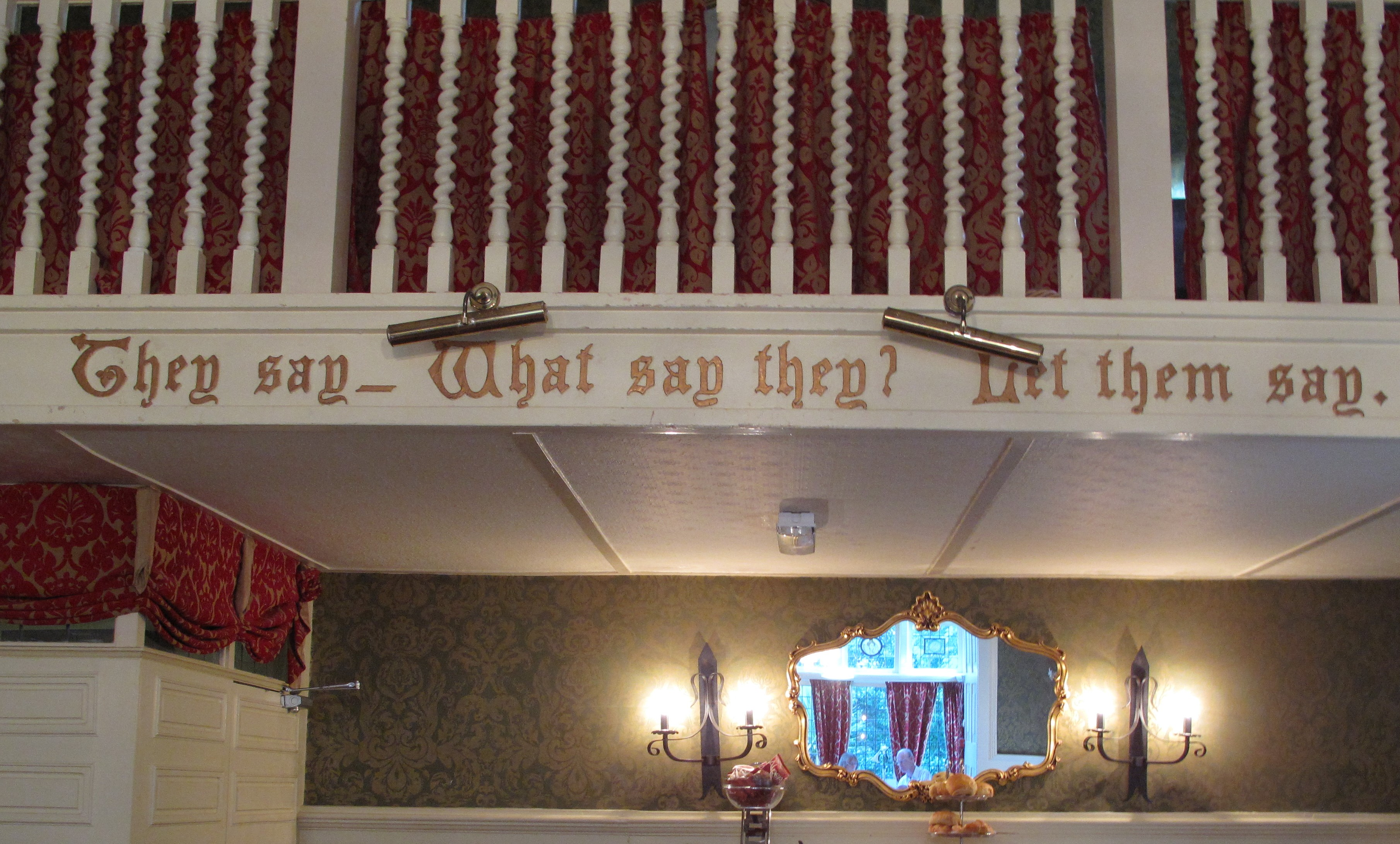

Emily Langton Langton (1847–1897) was born Emily Langton Massingberd, the eldest daughter of Charles Langton Massingberd of Gunby Hall, Lincolnshire. In 1867 she married her second cousin, Edmund Langton. The couple lived principally in Bournemouth. Edmund died, aged 34, in November 1875, at his father's home of Eastwood, East Cliffe Road, Bournemouth.

The widowed Emily Langton Langton was left with a son and three daughters. She turned to temperance work with the British Women's Temperance Association, and in 1877 built the Red House at the junction of Knyveton Road and Derby Road, Bournemouth, including a large assembly room for her meetings. The foundation stone of the home is inscribed "E.L.L. 1877". The interior of the house sports one of her mottos, "They say – what say they? Let them say", which she also emblazoned in the progressive women's club, the Pioneer Club, which she founded in 1892 in London.

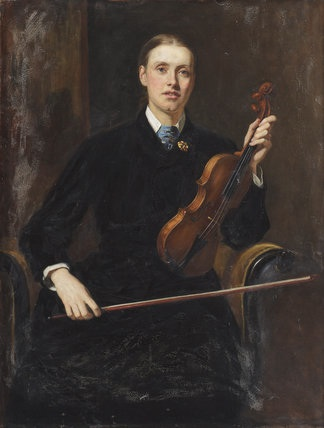
Emily Langton Langton, 1878 by Theodore Blake Wirgman

A portrait of Emily painted by Theodore Blake Wirgman in 1878 shows her with a violin, and in December 1880 she was one of the instrumentalists for the Congregational Band of Hope in the Richmond Hill Congregational School-room, Bournemouth. In January 1881 she held a notable fancy dress dance "at the Assembly Room of the Red House, Bournemouth". In September 1882 she held a "fashionable concert" at the Red House in aid of funds for the Bournemouth Dispensary.

Emily was not always at the Red House, and at the time of the 1881 Census in April she was staying in Kensington and the Red House had been let to John Edward Cooke, late of the Royal Navy, and his wife and young family. In 1882 the Red House was let to a Mr and Mrs Holdsworth.

Emily made her first speech in favour of women's suffrage at Westminster Town Hall in 1882. On 15 December 1883, Laura Ormiston Grant and Caroline Biggs held a suffrage meeting "at the home of Mrs Langton (The Red House, Derby Road)". Emily Langton is listed at the Red House in Snow's Directory and Strangers' Guide to Bournemouth for 1883/1884, and in Kelly's Directory of Hampshire for 1885.

Emily Langton Langton's father died in 1887 and she succeeded to his Gunby Hall estate in Lincolnshire. That year she resumed her maiden name of Massingberd by royal licence, describing herself as "of The Red House, Bournemouth, and of Gunby Hall, Lincoln, widow". For four years she managed the Gunby Hall estate herself, and then moved to London in 1891, and the Red House saw little of her when the house was often let to others.

== The Red House's later history ==
=== Subsequent tenants ===
In 1889 the wife of Warren Thomas Peacocke (d. 1920), a Captain in the Rifle Brigade, gave birth to a son, Warren "John" Richard Peacocke, at the Red House, though his family seems to have lived mainly at Efford Park, Lymington.

In 1891 the census shows the Red House inhabited by Emily Langton's young widowed sister Alice Clark (d. 1927) and her two young children, plus Emily's 18-year-old daughter Diana Massingberd, and five servants.

=== Bennett ownership ===
Emily Langton Langton died in 1897. By 1901 the Red House was occupied by Henry Martin Cornwall Legh (1839–1904), a retired Colonel in the Grenadier Guards, and his wife Constance. Shortly afterwards the Red House was occupied (and it seems owned) by the Revd George Bennett, former Head Master of Sarum Cathedral School (1881–90) and Rector of Folke, Dorset (1890–1903) and later Vicar of Rodmersham, Kent (1903–5) and Rector of West Quantoxhead, Bridgwater (1907–11). Bennett was, in fact, described as of the Red House in 1898, so he had presumably let the house to Colonel Legh for a short time.

The Bennetts seem to have continued to let the house, and in 1911 it was occupied by Louisa Lucy Sitwell, the 80-year-old widow of Sir Sitwell Reresby Sitwell, 3rd Baronet, who had died in 1862. Lady Sitwell, the grandmother of Edith Sitwell, died in October 1911 but by then was living at Balcombe Tower, Branksome Park, Bournemouth.

The Revd George Bennett died at the Red House, 5 September 1915. His widow, Caroline Elizabeth Bennett, died there 4 September 1937.

=== New ownership and hotel conversion ===
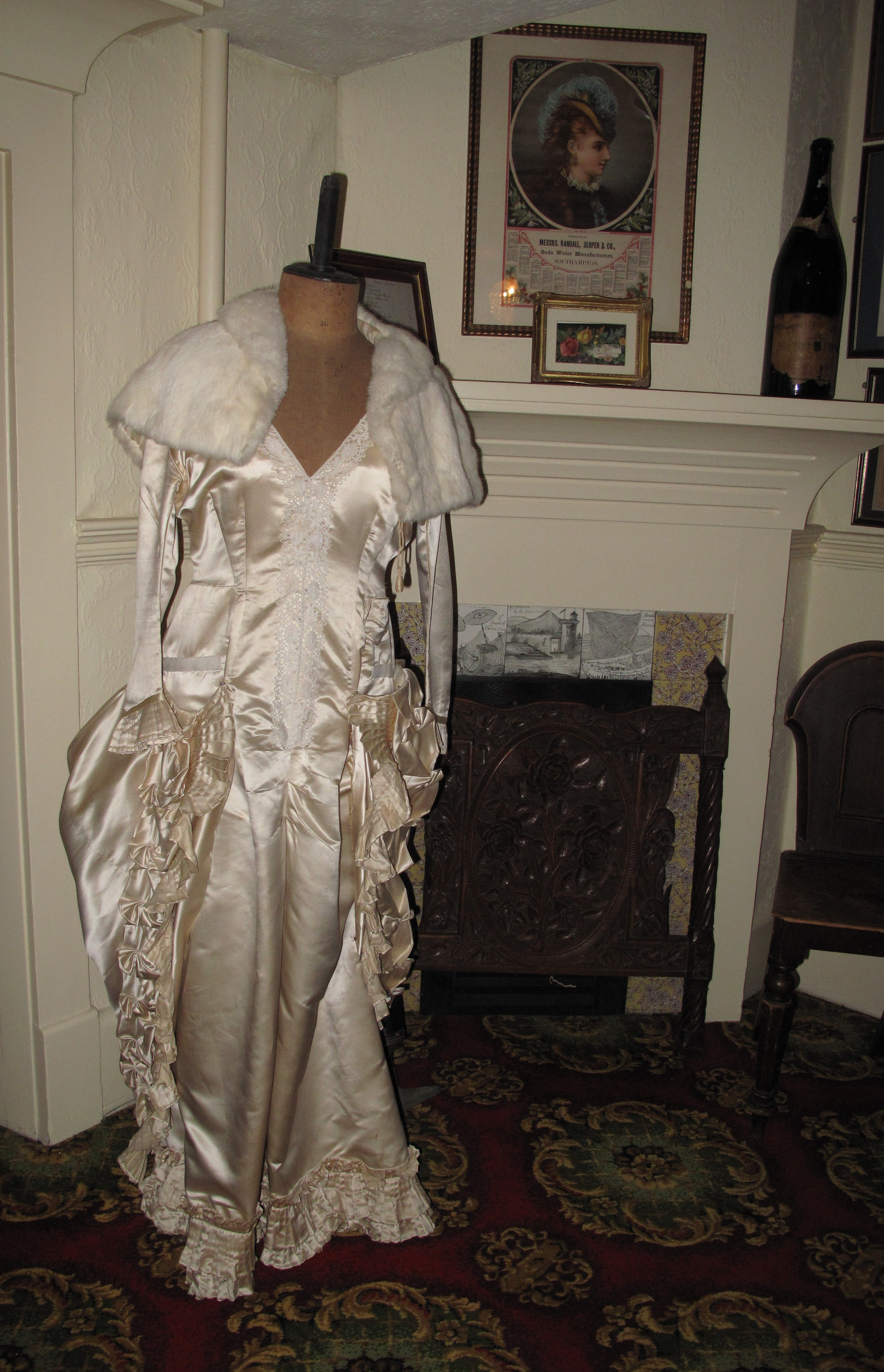
Dress exposed in Langtry Manor House in 2010

Immediately after Mrs Bennett's death in 1937, the house was sold and converted into a hotel. The first proprietors were Cecil Henry Ravenhill Hulbert (1895–1974) and his wife Dorothy Minnie, née Kemp (1899–1987), who named it the Manor Heath Hotel. From July 1938 they actively advertised it in newspapers, and produced a brochure saying that the house was "built originally for Lily Langtry".

In 1977 Pamela Howard and her family purchased the hotel. After remodelling it to period decor, including artefacts and pictures from 1877, and adding memorabilia and features relating to Lillie Langtry, they renamed it as the Langtry Manor Hotel. In 1978 the hugely popular television series "Lillie", starring Franscesca Annis as Lillie Langtry, was broadcast worldwide, accompanied by a novel written by David Butler. The series was mainly filmed in a television studio instead of on location in manor houses. However, Lillie Langtry became world famous again and the legends around the historical person thrived.

== The spurious Langtry legend ==
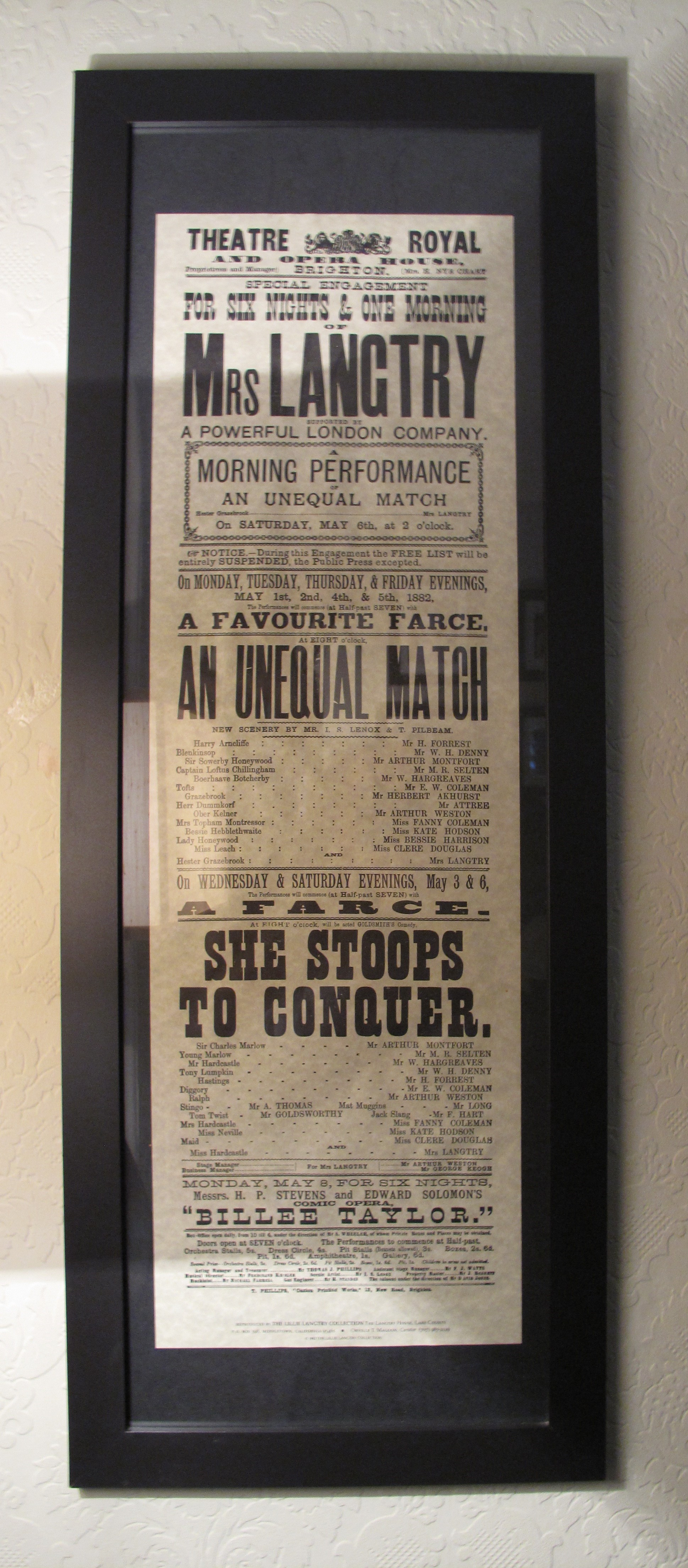
Original show bill - Lillie Langtry as actress. On view in Langry Manor Hotel in 2010.

By the 1940s, when memories of Emily Langton Langton's activities at Bournemouth had begun to fade, local people or the hotel proprietors apparently muddled the names and began to say that the single lady who had lived at the Red House in the 1880s was none other than the notorious Emilie "Lillie" Langtry, the mistress of the Prince of Wales (who later became Edward VII).

Lillie Langtry had lived in Monaco since 1918 and died in 1929. She had made no mention of the house or of any Bournemouth connection in her memoirs, The Days I Knew (1925). However, by the time the former journalist James Brough collected information for his The Prince & the Lily (1975), it was being said that Lillie and the Prince had designed and built the Red House in Derby Road on land which belonged to Lord Derby, that they had stayed in a smaller property on the land (Derby Lodge) while the house was being built, and that when completed the initials E.L.L. and the year 1877 were carved into the inglenook fireplace in the dining room.

Professor Jane Ridley, with (privileged) access to the Prince of Wales's diaries and other Royal Archives, states in her 2012 biography of Edward VII that there is no contemporaneous evidence that the Prince had any connection with the Red House or ever went or stayed there. She even doubts large parts of the story as published by Lillie Langtry herself in her memoirs and other legends around the relation between Lillie Langtry and King Edward VII when he was still heir to the British throne.

The Red House is on Derby Road, and it was fabled that the area had belonged to Lord Derby, but Lord Derby owned no land in Hampshire. Laura Beatty states in her biography that it is not clear when the building was started and finished: 'The Derby's, from whom the land was supposedly bought, have no records of the transaction nor of Lillie's and the Prince's many visits to Derby Lodge to plan and oversee the work. Sometime before the year was out, Lillie and the Prince went down to Bournemouth and laid a foundation stone. On it was carved the initials E.L.L. (perhaps for Emilie Le Breton Langtry or perhaps for Edward and Lillie Langtry), and the date 1877.' However, this is dubious. The published diaries of the 15th Lord Derby show he was very critical about the Prince of Wales and his extra-marital behaviour. Edward Henry Stanley, 15th the Earl of Derby, was British Secretary of State for Foreign Affairs between 21 February 1874 and 2 April 1878. He worried about the effects about all gossip about the Crown Prince on the Foreign policy of Britain. Research in the personal papers of the 15th Earl Derby by the late professor John Vincent, the editor of Derby's diaries, proved that Derby indeed never possessed any property in Bournemouth. So, the fable has to be false.

Lillie Langtry probably did not become the Prince's mistress until late in 1877 or early in 1878. The initials E.L.L., which were said to be those of Emilie Le Breton Langtry, were in reality those of Emily Langton Langton. By 24 May 1877, when Lillie Langtry first met the Prince of Wales, she had already dropped the name Emilie and the monograph on her writing paper was just "LL", whereas Emily Langton Langton's stationery monograph was "E.L.L."

Lillie Langtry's physical relationship with the Prince of Wales, as far as it existed, ended in June 1880 when she became pregnant. Prince Louis of Battenberg was probably the father of the child of Lillie Langtry. However, discovery of love letters made another interpretation possible - Lillie's old friend Arthur Jones from Jersey was the father.

== 21st century ==
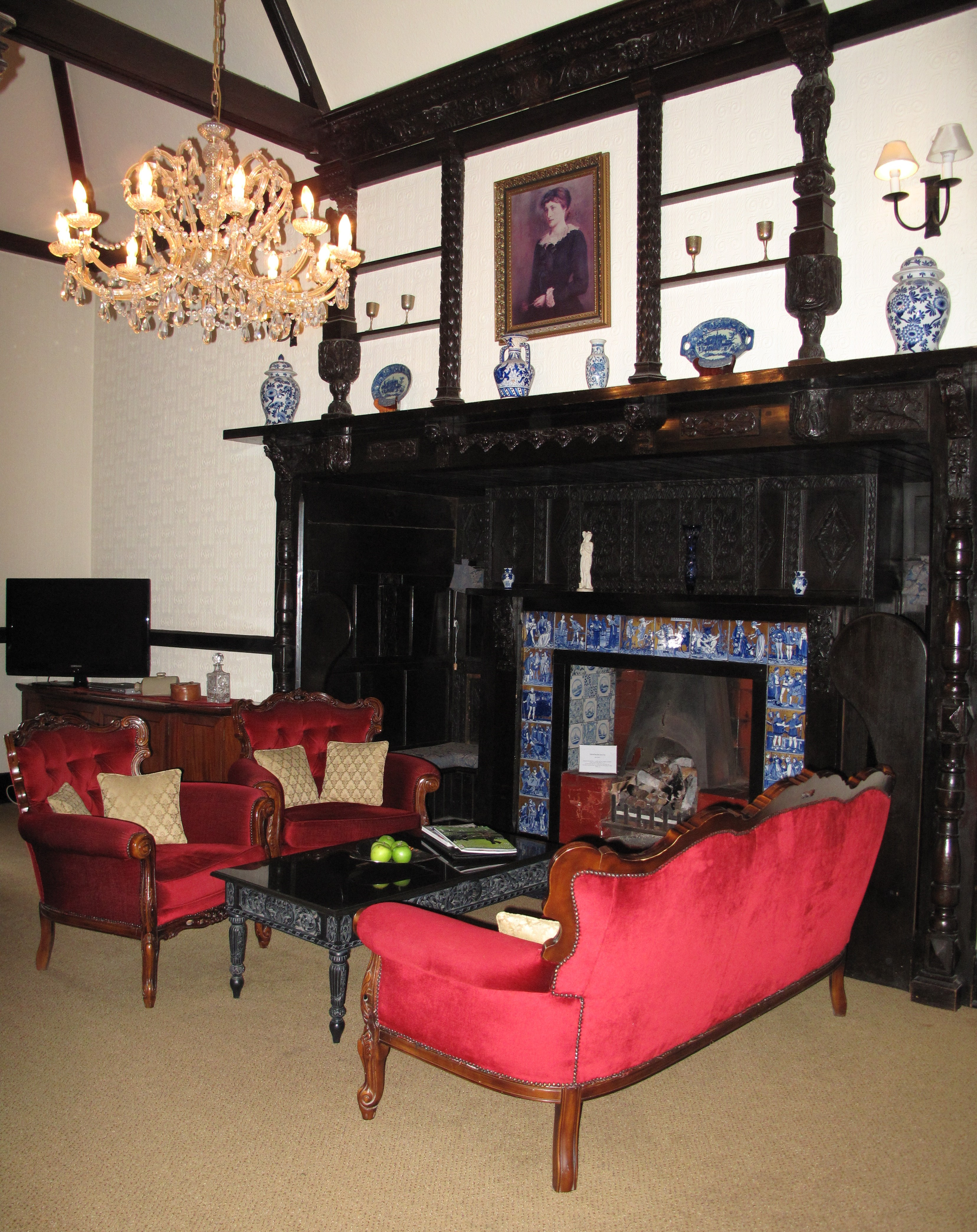

In 2006, Langtry Manor appeared as the subject of an episode of the Channel 5 television series The Hotel Inspector. Since then the hotel has won Best Small Hotel, Best Medium Hotel, and Best Customer Service awards from the Bournemouth Tourism Awards. The Guardian has named it the Best Hotel in Bournemouth. 'This was Edward VII and Lillie's old seaside love-nest (you can even book their bedroom if you get off on such things). It has many original fixtures and memorabilia and has the advantage of feeling like a country house hotel just 15 minutes' walk from the beach.'

In March 2015, the hotel changed hands and was taken over from the Howard family by the Meyrick Estate, which owned the freehold on the site. According to a statement, Pamela Howard had decided to retire. Her daughter already had left.

== Sources ==
- Beatty, Laura. Lillie Langtry: Manners, Masks and Morals (1999).
- Ridley, Jane, Bertie. A Life of Edward VII (2012)
