= International Who's Who in Music =

The International Who's Who in Music is a biographical dictionary and directory originally published by Shaw Publishing and Burke's Peerage, but later taken on by the more commercially driven International Biographical Centre of Cambridge, England. It contains only biographies of persons living at the time of publication and includes composers, performers, writers, and some music librarians. The biographies included are solicited from the subjects themselves and generally include date and place of birth, contact information as well as biographical background and achievements.

== History ==
The conductor Sir Landon Ronald was named as editor of the original Who's Who in Music, published in 1935 by Shaw Publishing and updated in 1937. The third edition was not issued until 1950, with Leslie Gilbert Pine as editor. Editions 4 to 6 were published (now by Burke's Peerage, where Pine was an executive director) under the title Who's Who in Music and Musicians' International Directory between 1962 and 1972. Editions 7 to 14 were published as International Who's Who in Music and Musicians' Directory between 1975 and 1995. Reviews of the 1990 edition in Booklist (Vol. 87, September 15, 1990) and The Times Literary Supplement (June 15, 1990) criticized the publication for "containing a great many inaccuracies."

In 1996, the book was split into two volumes: International Who's Who in Music and Musicians' Directory, Volume One, In the Classical and Light-Classical Fields and International Who's Who in Music, Volume Two, Popular Music. The two volumes were not always published concurrently and the publishers continue to change. The 18th edition of Who's Who in Classical Music and the 4th edition of Who's Who in Popular Music were published in 2002 by Europa Publications (a division of Routledge).

The 26th edition of Who's Who in Classical Music and the 12th edition of Who's Who in Popular Music were published directly under the Routledge imprint in 2010. The 2010 Who's Who in Classical Music contained over 8,000 individual biographies as well as obituaries for previous entrants who had died between 2002 and February 2010. It also contained a section with brief listings for orchestras, opera companies, major music festivals, music organizations, and music competitions and awards.

=== Early editions ===
- Who's Who in Music First Edition (London, 1935), Shaw Publishing Co. Ltd. Editor: Sir Landon Ronald
- Who's Who in Music, Second Edition (London, 1937), Shaw Publishing Co. Ltd. Editor: Sir Landon Ronald
- Who's Who in Music, Third Edition (1950), Shaw Publishing Co. Ltd. Editor: L.G. Pine
- Who's Who in Music and Musicians' International Directory, Fourth Edition (London, 1962), Burke's Peerage Ltd. Editor: David Simmons.
- Who's Who in Music and Musicians' International Directory, Fifth Edition (London, 1969), Burke's Peerage Ltd. Editor: W.J. Potterton.
- Who's who in Music and Musicians' International Directory, Sixth Edition (London, 1972), Burke's Peerage Ltd. Editor: J.V. Yates
- International Who's Who in Music and Musicians' Directory, Seventh Edition (Cambridge, 1975), International Biographical Centre. Editor: Ernest Kay
- International Who's Who in Music and Musicians' Directory, Eighth Edition (Cambridge, 1977), International Biographical Centre, Gale Research. Editor Adrian Gaster
- International Who's Who in Music and Musicians' Directory, Ninth Edition (Cambridge, 1980), International Biographical Centre, Gale Research. Editor Adrian Gaster
