= Betty Kenward =

British magazine columnist

- Born: Elizabeth Kemp-Welch; 14 July 1906; Warwickshire, England, U.K.
- Died: 31 January 2001 (aged 94); London, England, U.K.
- Occupation: Journalist
- Known for: "Jennifer's Diary"

Elizabeth Kenward MBE (née Kemp-Welch; 1906–2001) was an English magazine columnist, known for writing "Jennifer's Diary", originally in Tatler, subsequently in Queen.

== Life ==
She was born on 14 July 1906, the daughter of Brian Charles Durant Kemp-Welch of Kineton, Warwickshire, England, and was educated by a governess, and at a finishing school at Les Tourelles, Brussels, Belgium. The Kemp-Welch family were "solid county Warwickshire stock", appearing in Burke's Landed Gentry. Her brother was the cricketer George Kemp-Welch who married the eldest daughter of Stanley Baldwin.

She married Captain Peter Trayton Kenward of the 14th/20th King's Hussars, employed in his family's brewing business, at St Margaret's, Westminster, in 1932, and adopted his name. They divorced in 1942, leaving her with a nine-year-old son. To pay his fees at Winchester School, she worked as a dame (house matron) at Eton College. Captain Kenward remarried, to Patricia (1918–1957), daughter of Bolton Meredith Eyres-Monsell, 1st Viscount Monsell, in 1947, and in 1958 to Bridget Catherine Elizabeth Tucker (1928–2015).

Her Tatler column was originally called "On and Off Duty in Town and Country", becoming "Jennifer's Diary" in 1945. She took it to Queen (from 1970 Harpers & Queen) in 1959. She retired in 1991, when she was aged 84. Her obituary in The Daily Telegraph described her as "insufferably snobbish and crotchety", recounting her ferocious treatment of her assistants (many of whom resigned in tears), her propensity for long-running feuds (including, particularly, with Margaret, Duchess of Argyll), and her persistent snubbing of Tatler's social editor, Peter Townend.

She appeared as a castaway on the BBC Radio programme Desert Island Discs on 14 December 1974.

She was made a Member of the Order of the British Empire (MBE) in 1986. Her autobiography, Jennifer's Memoirs: Eighty-Five Years of Fun and Functions, was published in 1992.

She died on 24 January 2001 in London.

== Bibliography ==
- Kenward, Betty (1992). Jennifer's Memoirs: Eighty-Five Years of Fun and Functions. London: HarperCollins. ISBN 978-0002551137.
