= Emily Langton Massingberd =

English women's rights activist (1847–1897)

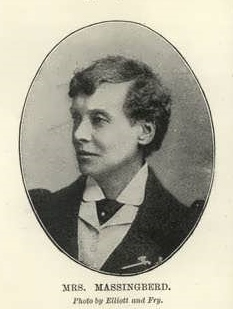
Upon her father's death in 1887 Langton inherited his estate and re-assumed the surname Massingberd by royal licence, and thereafter went by "Mrs. Massingberd" rather than "Mrs. Langton". The photograph, circa 1894, shows her wearing the hatchet pin of the Pioneer Club, which she founded in 1892.

Emily Caroline Langton Massingberd (19 December 1847 – 28 January 1897), known as Emily Langton Langton from 1867 to 1887, was an English women's rights campaigner and temperance activist.

Her husband, Edmund Langton, died in 1875. In 1877, Emily built and lived in the Red House in Bournemouth. Since the 1940s, the house has often been erroneously associated with Lillie Langtry and Bertie, the Prince of Wales. Upon her father's death in 1887, she inherited Gunby Hall.

In 1892, she founded the Pioneer Club, with the object of the political and moral advancement of women. It was one of the first, and one of the most powerful and well known, of progressive women's clubs in the UK, and was particularly influential while she remained alive.

Her birth surname was Massingberd, and her married surname was Langton. After her father's death, she re-assumed the surname Massingberd by royal licence on 20 May 1887, and went by "Mrs. Massingberd" rather than "Mrs. Langton".

== Early life and family ==
Emily Massingberd was born Emily Caroline Langton Massingberd on 19 December 1847 in East Stonehouse, Devon. She was the eldest daughter of Charles Langton Massingberd of Gunby Hall and Harriet Anne Langford.

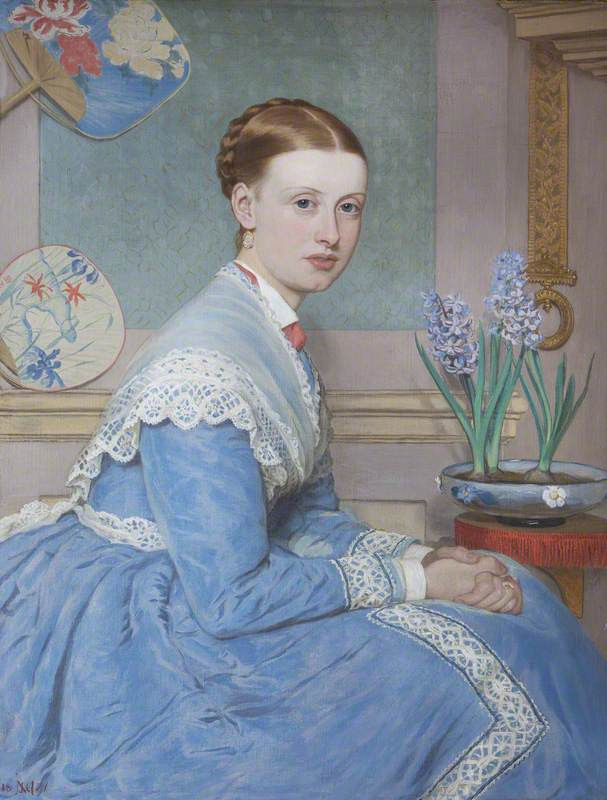
Emily Langton Langton (1871)
by John Collingham Moore

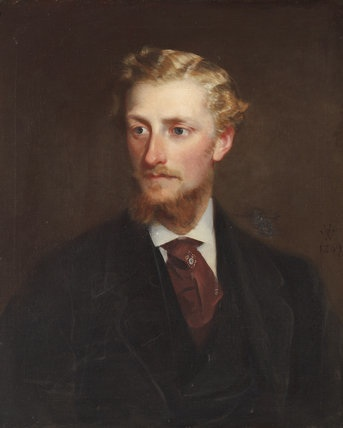
Edmund Langton (1869)
by Theodore Blake Wirgman

She married her second cousin, Edmund Langton, in 1867. Edmund was the son of Rev. Charles Langton and Charles Darwin's sister-in-law Charlotte Wedgwood Langton. After Charlotte died Rev. Langton married Darwin's sister Emily Catherine Darwin in 1863.

Emily and Edmund had four children, a son and three daughters: Charlotte Mildred (1868–1941), Stephen (1869–1925), Mary (1871–1950), and Diana (1872–1963).

Her husband Edmund died, aged 34, in November 1875, at Eastwood, East Cliffe Road, Bournemouth, the home of his father Rev. Charles Langton.

Her daughter Charlotte Mildred married Charles Darwin's son Leonard Darwin. Her son Stephen became a Major and married Vernon Lushington's daughter Margaret. Her daughter Mary married General Hugh Maude de Fellenberg Montgomery. Her daughter Diana married Hugh's brother Field Marshal Archibald Montgomery-Massingberd. Emily was great-grandmother to Hugh Montgomery-Massingberd (1946–2007), via her daughter Mary's son John Michael Montgomery.

Emily died in 1897. In 1944 her daughter Diana and husband Field Marshal Archibald Montgomery-Massingberd gave the Gunby Hall estate to the National Trust during World War II, when it was threatened with demolition to make way for an airfield.

== Activist years ==
After marriage in 1867, Emily and Edmund Langton lived mainly in Bournemouth. Edmund died in 1875 at the age of 34, leaving Emily with a son and three daughters.

She turned to temperance work with the British Women's Temperance Association. She also built a new residence in Bournemouth, the Red House, at the junction of Knyveton Road and Derby Road, where she often lived, held meetings, and entertained. The foundation stone for the house, which includes a large assembly room, is inscribed "E.L.L. 1877".

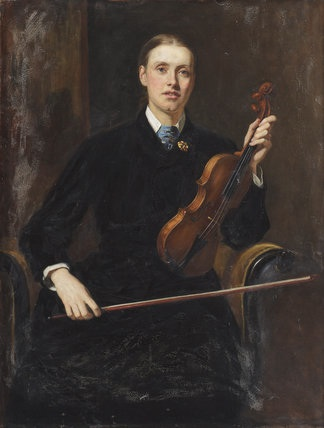
Emily Langton Langton in 1878 by Theodore Blake Wirgman

A portrait of Emily painted in 1878 by Theodore Blake Wirgman shows her with a violin, and in December 1880 she was one of the instrumentalists for the Congregational Band of Hope in the Richmond Hill Congregational School-room, Bournemouth. In January 1881 she held a notable fancy dress dance "at the Assembly Room of the Red House, Bournemouth". In September 1882 she held a "fashionable concert" at the Red House in aid of funds for the Bournemouth Dispensary.

By 1881, she was staying in Kensington, London. An enthusiastic supporter of women's suffrage, she made her first speech in favour of it at Westminster Town Hall in 1882.

In Bournemouth, on 15 December 1883, suffragettes Laura Ormiston Chant and Caroline Biggs "held a drawing-room meeting at the home of Mrs Langton (The Red House, Derby Road)". Emily Langton is listed at the Red House in Kelly's Directory of Hampshire for 1885.

When her father died in 1887, she succeeded to Gunby Hall and resumed her maiden name by royal licence, and thenceforth went by "Mrs. Massingberd" rather than "Mrs. Langton". For the next four years she managed the estate herself, and then moved to London.

In London, she involved herself in the temperance, anti-vivisectionist, and women's movements. Becoming a vice-president of the United Kingdom Alliance, a Manchester-based temperance movement, she was also honorary treasurer to Lady Henry Somerset's Cottage Homes for Inebriates, a farm colony for women at Duxhurst, just south of Reigate.

=== Pioneer Club ===
Massingberd founded the Pioneer Club in 1892 to provide women, in particular middle-class women and unmarried women, with a place to socialise outside their homes, "a place where women gathered to meet each other, to help each other and to discuss the leading questions and principal progressive work of the day". It remained active until 1939.

It was the only British club to be affiliated to the General Federation of Women's Clubs.

By 1895, it had more than 300 members (by 1899 more than 600), stressed the unimportance of social position, provided members and their guests with meals and on Thursday evenings organised lectures, debates and discussion on social political and literary themes. Speakers included Bernard Shaw, Millicent Fawcett, Mrs Pearsall Smith, Lady Henry Somerset and Frances Willard. Men might be invited by members on Wednesday evenings.

== Illness and death ==
Following a long illness, Emily Langton Massingberd underwent a serious operation at Llandudno in Wales, but a few weeks later died on 28 January 1897. She was 49 years old.

Following Massingberd's untimely death, L. T. Meade wrote a novel in 1898 based on her life titled The Cleverest Woman in England. In it she writes of the protagonist:

She was one of the pioneers in a great movement; and although her life ceased when her work was hardly begun, there are still some women in London who remember her, and can never forget her ... who but for her would not have dared to break through the thraldom of the narrow walls of old prejudice, and those women still in memory hear her voice, and touch her hand.
