= Grosvenor Crescent =

Street in Belgravia, London

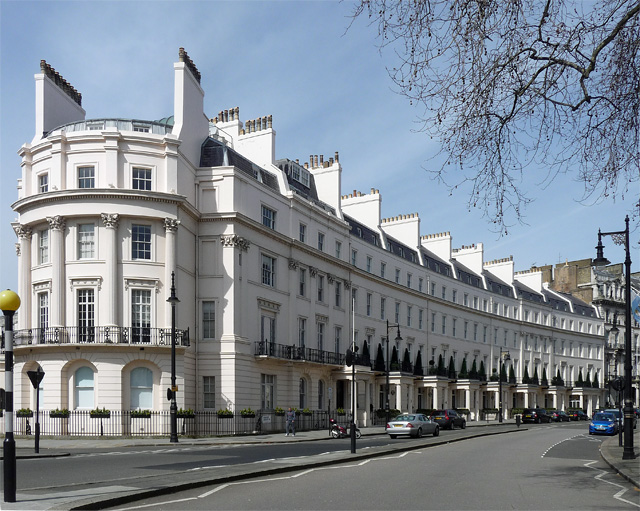
- 1–10 Grosvenor Crescent, 2013
- Interactive map of Grosvenor Crescent
- Location: Belgravia, London, England
- Coordinates: 51°30′04″N 0°09′12″W
- From: Belgrave Square
- To: Grosvenor Place

Grosvenor Crescent is a street in London's Belgravia district, that in December 2017 was ranked as the UK's most expensive residential street, with an average house price of £16,918,000.

Grosvenor Crescent runs from the north-east corner of Belgrave Square to the northern end of Grosvenor Place at Hyde Park Corner, and forms part of the B310.

In 1897, the progressive women's Pioneer Club was due to move to 15 Grosvenor Crescent, but there was a split in membership after its founder Emily Massingberd's death that January, and many remained at the old location. The new location became the Grosvenor Crescent Club, which by 1900 was describing itself as "purely social".

3-10 Grosvenor Crescent is a Grade II* listed terrace of eight houses on the north/west side of the crescent, built after 1836 by Seth Smith, that were originally individual houses, before becoming offices and are now 15 flats, with underground parking. In November 2017, four of the residents, including Iouri Chliaifchtein, a financier, who bought his apartment for £18 million, and Oleg Smirnov who paid £15.7 million, were suing the management company (of which Chliaifchtein is a director) for alleged inadequate levels of concierge staff. They were opposed by Simon Arora, whose family own three of the flats, who said that Chliaifchtein was being "completely unreasonable". Judge Nigel Gerald ruled in favour of Chliaifchtein, and agreed that two staff members should be on duty at all times (as had been the case until April 2015), and that the management company would have to pay the £320,000 legal bill.

The Embassy of Belgium is at no 17 since 2006. The building was designed by George Basevi in the 1860s, and is Grade II listed.
