= Peter Townend (editor) =

British society reporter, editor, and genealogist

Kenneth Peter Townend (26 April 1921 – 16 July 2001) was a British genealogist and social editor. He served as editor of Burke's Peerage and later as social editor of Tatler.

== Early life and education ==
Townend was born in Leeds on 26 April 1921, son of Claude William Townend, a farmer and Army riding instructor, and Florence Lily, née Atkinson. As a child, he suffered from meningitis, which meant he had little formal education, but did attend King's School, Pontefract. His mother "keenly followed the doings of the Royal Family and aristocracy", and her son was surrounded by society magazines from an early age.

== Career ==
Townend served in the Royal Navy during the Second World War as a writer/clerk, and afterwards joined Burke's Peerage under L. G. Pine as an archivist. He became editor of Burke's in 1960 until he was replaced by Hugh Montgomery-Massingberd in 1971 or 1972, by which time he was social editor of Tatler magazine, and had become renowned for his organisation of the vestigial UK "deb scene". Townend reportedly asked Jennie Hallam-Peel to "keep the season alive" prior to his death, leading to the revamping of the Queen Charlotte's Ball.
