= Hugh Massingberd =

English journalist and genealogist (1946–2007)

- Born: Hugh John Montgomery; 30 December 1946 Cookham Dean, Berkshire, England
- Died: 25 December 2007 (aged 60) London, England
- Occupation: Journalist; editor; geneaologist
- Notable works: Time as the obituaries editor of The Daily Telegraph
- Spouse: Christine Martinoni (m. 1972; div. 1979); Caroline Ripley (m. 1983)
- Children: 2

Hugh John Massingberd (30 December 1946 – 25 December 2007), originally Hugh John Montgomery and known from 1963 to 1992 as Hugh Montgomery-Massingberd, was an English journalist and genealogist. He began his career at Burke's Peerage/Burke's Landed Gentry, serving as its chief editor from 1971 to 1983. However, he was most revered for his subsequent work as obituaries editor for The Daily Telegraph of London from 1986 to 1994, where he is credited with inventing the modern British obituary, exchanging the dry recital of biographical data for a more stylish, sly, and witty narrative of the deceased person's life.

== Biography ==
Hugh John Montgomery was born at Cookham Dean, Berkshire, on 30 December 1946, son of John Michael Montgomery, a member of the Colonial Service, and schoolmistress Marsali, daughter of stockjobber Francis Joseph Seal. She married John Montgomery after the death of her first husband, Roger de Winton Kelsall Winlaw, in 1942 on active service in the Royal Air Force. Hugh was the first child of her marriage to John Montgomery. Through his father, Hugh Massingberd was a great-grandson of women's-rights pioneer Emily Langton Massingberd. He was a great-great-grandson of Charlotte Langton (born Wedgwood) who was herself a granddaughter of the potter and philanthropist Josiah Wedgwood and a sister of Emma Wedgwood, wife of Charles Darwin.

His boyhood enthusiasms included cricket, reading, horseracing, and showbusiness.

His father was the son of a brother of Field Marshal Sir Archibald Montgomery-Massingberd of Gunby Hall, Lincolnshire, while his mother was the sister of the Field Marshal's wife, Diana. To inherit their estate, in 1963 John and his son Hugh were obliged to adopt the name of Massingberd, and both decided to become Montgomery-Massingberds. However, in 1992 Hugh abandoned his original surname and thereafter was known simply as Hugh Massingberd.

After leaving school, he worked for three years as an articled law clerk, before gaining a place at Cambridge University to read history. He then "drifted into publishing and journalism".

He was extremely proud of his reputation as a gourmand and a trencherman, posing at one time for a portrait with a garland of sausages. Often retold was the story of his having eaten the largest breakfast ever served at The Connaught hotel in 1972; the head waiter reported to his table that the previous record holder had been King Farouk I of Egypt. It is said that as the waiter recited the various items available on the menu, Massingberd simply nodded throughout.

In 1972 Massingberd married Christine Martinoni, with whom he had a daughter, Harriet, and a son, Luke. They were divorced in 1979 and he married, secondly, Caroline Ripley in 1983. Massingberd was known for his wit in his private life as well as in his public life as a writer. A friend once asked him, during one of Massingberd's low moods, what would cheer him up; after some thought, Massingberd replied, "To sing patriotic songs in drag before an appreciative audience."

Massingberd was diagnosed with cancer in 2004 and died in London on Christmas Day, 2007, five days before his 61st birthday.

== Career ==
After leaving school at Harrow, Massingberd discarded initial plans to attend the University of Cambridge, instead choosing to work as a law clerk. He then moved to an assistantship at Burke's Peerage, the historic chronicler of the nobility and landed gentry of the British Isles. He was chief editor of Burke's Peerage from 1971 to 1983. Massingberd then worked as a freelance columnist for The Spectator and The Field until taking up a position with The Daily Telegraph in 1986.

As obituaries editor at The Daily Telegraph, Massingberd entirely altered the reverential but otherwise factual style of the obituary. He replaced the traditional tone of respect with one of adroitly subtle humour, and quickly drew readership. The New York Times reported that "cataclysmic understatement and carefully coded euphemism were the stylistic hallmarks of his page". He said his inspiration was Roy Dotrice's performance in 1969 in Brief Lives in the West End in which Dotrice, after reading out a "dull, formulaic entry about a barrister, shut the book with a 'Pshaw' and turned to the audience to say 'He got more by his prick than his practice'". Massingberd said that he resolved then "to dedicate myself to chronicling what people were really like through informal anecdote, description and character sketch". He felt it was possible to give a true assessment of the subject and to present "a sympathetic acceptance, even celebration, of someone's foibles and faults".

Massingberd famously referred to the 6th Earl of Carnarvon, a deceased man with a habit of indecent exposure, as "an uncompromisingly direct ladies' man". He termed the late maverick Dead Sea Scrolls academician John Allegro, who later argued for Judeo-Christian cultism regarding mushrooms and sexual intercourse, the "Liberace of biblical scholarship".

Massingberd's sphere of influence was large. Following his editorship tenure, obituaries in not only The Daily Telegraph but in many other British publications, such as The Times of London, took on the dryly impish character for which his writings had become famous. He wrote more than 30 books, some of which he collaborated with Christopher Simon Sykes, many of them on the British aristocracy and the great houses of England, Scotland and Ireland. He reviewed books for The Spectator, Country Life and the Telegraph, and also wrote a play based on the diaries of James Lees-Milne.

A severe heart attack in 1994 forced Massingberd to undergo quadruple bypass surgery. During his recovery period, he wrote as The Daily Telegraph's television critic, but resigned in 1996. After his resignation, Massingberd continued to write, authoring book reviews for The Daily Telegraph as well as several theatrical works. When one of his theatre pieces, Love and Art, was produced at the Wallace Collection in 2005, Massingberd played one of the roles on stage.

== Works ==
As author

- The Monarchy (1979)
- The British Aristocracy (with Mark Bence-Jones, 1979)
- The London Ritz (with David Watkin, 1980)
- The Country Life Book of Royal Palaces, Castles and Homes (with Patrick Montague-Smith, 1981)
- Diana: The Princess of Wales (1982)
- Heritage of Royal Britain (1983)
- Royal Palaces of Europe (1984)
- Blenheim Revisited (1985)
- Her Majesty The Queen (1986)
- Debrett's Great British Families (1987)
- The Field Book of Country Houses and their Owners: Family Seats of the British Isles (1988)
- Queen Elizabeth The Queen Mother (1999)
- Daydream Believer: Confessions of a Hero-Worshipper (2001; autobiographical)

With Christopher Simon Sykes:

- Great Houses of England and Wales (1994)
- Great Houses of Scotland (1997)
- Great Houses of Ireland (1999)
- English Manor Houses (2001)

As editor

- Burke's Peerage, Baronetage & Knightage (1971–1983; assistant editor, 1968–1971)
- Burke's Guide to the Royal Family (1973)
- Burke's Irish Family Records (1976)
- Burke's Royal Families of the World, Vols. 1 and 2 (1977 and 1980)
- Burke's Guide to Country Houses, Vols. 1–3 (1978, 1980 and 1981)
- The Daily Telegraph Record of the Second World War (1989)
- A Guide to the Country Houses of the North-West (1991)
- The Disintegration of a Heritage: Country Houses and their Collections 1979–1992 (1993)
- The Daily Telegraph Book of Obituaries: A Celebration of Eccentric Lives (1995)
- The Daily Telegraph Second Book of Obituaries: Heroes and Adventurers (1996)
- The Daily Telegraph Third Book of Obituaries: Entertainers (1997)
- The Daily Telegraph Fourth Book of Obituaries: Rogues (1998)
- The Daily Telegraph Fifth Book of Obituaries: Twentieth-Century Lives (2000)
- The Very Best of the Daily Telegraph Books of Obituaries (2001)
