= Burke's Landed Gentry =

Genealogical record of important British and Irish families

- Burke’s Landed Gentry: The Principality of Wales and The North West (2006)
- Edited by: John Burke (first)
- Country: United Kingdom
- Genre: Nobility, heraldry, genealogy
- Publisher: John Burke family et al.
- Published: 1833 (first edition)

Burke's Landed Gentry (originally titled Burke's Commoners) is a reference work listing families in Great Britain and Ireland who have owned rural estates of some size. The work has been in existence from the first half of the 19th century, and was founded by John Burke. He and successors from the Burke family, and others since, have written in it on genealogy and heraldry relating to gentry families.

It has evolved alongside Burke's Peerage, Baronetage & Knightage. The two works are regarded as complementing each other. Since the early 20th century, the work includes families that historically possessed landed property.

== Rationale ==
Sir Bernard Burke, Norroy and Ulster King of Arms's Arms of Office

In the 18th and 19th centuries, the names and families of those with titles (specifically peers and baronets, less often including those with the non-hereditary title of knight) were often listed in books or manuals known as "Peerages", "Baronetages", or combinations of these categories, such as the "Peerage, Baronetage, Knightage, and Companionage". As well as listing genealogical information, these books often also included details of the right of a given family to a coat of arms. They were comparable to the Almanach de Gotha in continental Europe.

In the 1830s, John Burke, the author of Burke's Peerage, expanded his market and his readership by publishing a similar volume for people without titles. The title of the first edition in 1833 expressed its scope clearly: A Genealogical and Heraldic History of the Commoners of Great Britain and Ireland, enjoying Territorial Possessions or High Official Rank, but uninvested with Heritable Honours. It looked at both the family history and the arms of selected families who owned land or occupied important posts in the United Kingdom, but did not hold inherited titles.

At the time the series started, the group it covered had considerable political, social and economic influence in their localities and in some cases nationally. During the 20th century, the power of rural landowners and the public's interest in buying books about them largely disappeared. Few of the families in the books still own country estates, a rare example being the Fulfords of Great Fulford near Dunsford in Devon who were mentioned in the 2012 TV series "Country House Rescue" and were described in Burke's Landed Gentry as having lived there since the reign of King Richard I (1189–1199).

Until 1914, possession of landed property was a strict requirement. If a family sold or lost its estates, it was no longer included in Burke's Landed Gentry. Illustrating this point, at least half of the families included in 1861 were omitted from the 1914 edition. Following the alienation of families from their land after World War I, the editors considered that such a strict policy was no longer productive, and in recognition of historical and genealogical value many pedigrees appeared titled (family name) 'formerly of' or 'late of' (place).

A review of the 1952 edition in Time noted:

Landed Gentry used to limit itself to owners of domains that could properly be called "stately" (i.e. more than 500 acres or 200 hectares). Now it has lowered the property qualification to 200 acres (0.81 km^{2}) for all British families whose pedigrees have been "notable" for three generations. Even so, almost half of the 5,000 families listed in the new volume are in there because their forefathers were: they themselves have no land left. Their estates are mere street addresses, like that of the Molineux-Montgomeries, formerly of Garboldisham Old Hall, now of No. 14 Malton Avenue, Haworth.

== Uses ==
Owing to the characteristic prose style developed by John Burke, the publication's founder, the material included in Burke's Landed Gentry, often based on work by many earlier authorities, was made more readable than had previously been the case, a style maintained by his successors. This prose style, when subsequently employed by John Burke's son, Ulster King of Arms Sir Bernard Burke, took a turn towards flowery wording in keeping with the literary tastes of the Victorian period in which he wrote.

Families were arranged in alphabetical order by surname, and each family article was headed with the surname and the name of their landed property, e.g. "Capron of Southwick Hall". There was then a paragraph on the owner of the property, with his coat of arms illustrated, and all his children and remoter male-line descendants also listed, each with full names and details of birth, marriage, death, and any matters tending to enhance their social prestige, such as school and university education, military rank and regiment, Church of England cures held, and other honours and socially approved involvements. Cross references were included to other families in Burke's Landed Gentry or in Burke's Peerage and Baronetage: thus encouraging browsing through connections. Professional details were not usually mentioned unless they conferred some social status, such as those of civil service and colonial officials, judges and barristers. After the section dealing with the current owner of the property, there usually appeared a section entitled Lineage which listed, not only ancestors of the owner, but (so far as known) every male-line descendant of those ancestors.

The widespread inclusion of family legends which, due to the large number of families included in each edition, the Burke family were unable to comprehensively check, resulted in some criticism of the accuracy of information contained in the volumes. Accordingly, more recent editions are more scrupulously checked and rewritten for accuracy. Advertisements for the 1894 edition stated: "Apocryphal statements, which had crept into former editions, have been expunged, erroneous particulars and incorrect descents discovered and omitted..."

This dedication to accuracy reached its peak under the chief editorship, from 1949 to 1959, of L. G. Pine – who was very sceptical regarding many families' claims to antiquity: 'If everybody who claims to have come over with the Conqueror were right, William must have landed with 200,000 men-at-arms instead of about 12,000', – and Hugh Massingberd (1971–83).

== Editions ==
=== General ===
Date range	Edition	Full title	Volumes	Online versions
1833–1835	1st	A Genealogical and Heraldic History of the Commoners of Great Britain and Ireland, enjoying Territorial Possessions or High Official Rank, but uninvested with Heritable Honours	3	Vol 1: (1835): Archive.org; Internet Archive; Vol 2: (1835): Archive.org; Vol 3: (1836): Archive.org
1836–1837	reissue with additional volume	same (additional volume in 1837)	4	Vol 1: (1836): Archive.org; Vol 2: (1836): Internet Archive; Vol 3: (1836): Archive.org; Vol 1–4: (1836–1837) small paper edition: Ancestry.com Library edition$ - all four volumes in file
1843–1849	1st edition	A Genealogical and Heraldic Dictionary of the Landed Gentry of Great Britain and Ireland, a companion to the Baronetage and Knightage	3	Vol 1 (1846): Google Books; Vol 1 (1847): Google Books
1850–1853	2nd edition, re-issue of previous edition, with additional pages in Addenda	A Genealogical and Heraldic Dictionary of the Landed Gentry of Great Britain and Ireland comprising particulars of 100,000 individuals	3	Vol 3 (1850): Google Books; Vol 1: (1853): HathiTrust; Vol 2: (1853): HathiTrust; Vol 3: (1853): HathiTrust
1855–1858	3rd edition	A Genealogical and Heraldic Dictionary of the Landed Gentry of Great Britain and Ireland with Supplement	1, with Supplement	Vol 1: Archive.org; Google Books
1862-1863	4th edition	A Genealogical and Heraldic Dictionary of the Landed Gentry of Great Britain and Ireland (First edition that mentions the edition on the title page)	2	Part 1: Internet Archive; Part 2: Internet Archive; Archive.org
1868	revised 4th edition	A Genealogical and Heraldic Dictionary of the Landed Gentry of Great Britain and Ireland, with Supplement and Corrigenda		
1871	5th Edition, re-issued with two Supplements and Addenda, 1875	A Genealogical and Heraldic History of the Landed Gentry of Great Britain and Ireland	2	Vol 1: (1871): Google Books; Vol 2: (1871): Google Books; Vol 1: (1875) reissue "With Supplement and Addenda": Google Books
1879	6th edition, re-issued with larger Supplement and Addenda, 1882	A Genealogical and Heraldic History of the Landed Gentry of Great Britain and Ireland	2	Vol 1: Archive.org; Vol 2: Archive.org
1886	7th edition	A Genealogical and Heraldic History of the Landed Gentry of Great Britain and Ireland	2	
1894	8th edition	A Genealogical and Heraldic History of the Landed Gentry of Great Britain and Ireland	2	Vol 2: Archive.org
1898	9th edition, including a separate section on Ireland	A Genealogical and Heraldic Dictionary of the Landed Gentry	2	Vol 1: HathiTrust; Vol 2: HathiTrust
1900	10th edition, with Addenda	A Genealogical and Heraldic Dictionary of the Landed Gentry of Great Britain		
1906	11th edition	A Genealogical and Heraldic Dictionary of the Landed Gentry of Great Britain		
1914	12th edition	A Genealogical and Heraldic Dictionary of the Landed Gentry, revised by A. C. Fox-Davies		
1921	13th edition	A Genealogical and Heraldic Dictionary of the Landed Gentry of Great Britain, ed. A. Winton Thorpe		Google Books
1925	14th edition, re-issue of 1921 edition, with Supplement	A Genealogical and Heraldic Dictionary of the Landed Gentry of Great Britain and Ireland, ed. Alfred T. Butler		
1937	15th "Centenary" edition	Burke's Genealogical and Heraldic History of the Landed Gentry, ed. Pirie-Gordon, H.	1	
1939	16th edition	Burke's Genealogical and Heraldic History of the Landed Gentry including American Families with British Ancestry, ed. L. G. Pine et al.		
1952	17th edition, 1954 Supplement, also ed. L. G. Pine	Burke's Genealogical and Heraldic History of the Landed Gentry, ed. L. G. Pine		
1965–1972	18th edition	Burke's Genealogical and Heraldic History of the Landed Gentry, Vol. 1 & 2 1965–9, ed. Peter Townend; Vol. 3 1972 (with Index to all three Volumes) ed. Hugh Montgomery-Massingberd	3	
2001–2006	19th edition	Burke's Landed Gentry : (Vol 1: The Kingdom of Scotland, 2001 ed. Peter Beauclerk Dewar; Vol. 2: The Ridings of York, 2005 ed. Charles Mosley; Vol 3 & 4: The Principality of Wales and the North West, 2006 ed. Charles Mosley)	4	

=== Irish supplement ===
The early editions of Burke's Landed Gentry were "of Great Britain and Ireland". After 1899, to allow the authors to cover the topics in more depth, there was a Great Britain edition and an Ireland edition. The Ireland edition is important for genealogists, because it includes not only the Old English (12th century onward arrivals) and the New English families (16th century onward arrivals), but also some of the leading elements of the Gaelic Irish families who previously ruled vast swathes of Ireland and maintained some influence, including the O'Briens, the O'Conors, the MacCarthys, the Kavanaghs, and more.

Date range	Edition	Full title	Volumes	Online versions
1899	1st	A Genealogical and Heraldic History of the Landed Gentry of Ireland	1	
1904	2nd	A Genealogical and Heraldic History of the Landed Gentry of Ireland	1	
1912	3rd	A Genealogical and Heraldic History of the Landed Gentry of Ireland	1	
1958	4th	Genealogical and Heraldic History of the Landed Gentry of Ireland	1	
1976	5th	Irish Family Records	1	

== See also ==
- Burke's Peerage
- College of Arms
