= Richard Pine =

Irish literary and music critic

Richard Leslie Beswetherick Pine (born 21 August 1949) is a critic and author of critical works on the Irish playwright Brian Friel, the Anglo-Irish novelist Lawrence Durrell, and aspects of art music in Ireland. He worked for the Irish national broadcaster RTÉ Raidió Teilifís Éireann before moving to Greece in 2001 to found the Durrell School of Corfu, which he directed until 2010. Since 2009 he has written a regular column on Greek affairs in The Irish Times and is also an obituarist for The Guardian.

In 2012, to mark the centenary of the birth of Lawrence Durrell, Pine edited and introduced a previously unpublished novel by Durrell, Judith, set in 1940s Palestine. He has since edited a further novel by Durrell, The Placebo, and a two-volume edition of Durrell's ephemeral and hard-to-find material: plays, short novels, stories, diaries and travel writings. Lawrence Durrell described Pine's work as "the best unpacking of my literary baggage I have heard."

== Early life ==
Richard Pine was born in London, the only child of L. G. Pine and his wife Grace Violet, daughter of Albert Griffin. After attending Westminster School (1962–66), he began higher education in Ireland taking a BA in 1971 at Trinity College Dublin (TCD) and a H.Dip.Ed in 1972, being President and gold medalist of the University Philosophical Society and winner of the Vice-Chancellor's Prize for English.

== Career in Ireland ==
After university, Pine remained in Ireland, joining Raidió Teilifís Éireann (RTÉ) as Concerts Manager, responsible (among other ensembles) for the RTÉ National Symphony Orchestra. In 1983, he became a senior editor in RTÉ's Public Affairs Division; a post he held for 16 years, subsequently editing the 6-volume series "Broadcasting and Irish Society" published for RTE by Four Courts Press (2002–2005). He also wrote and presented many programmes for RTÉ Radio, including a 15-part documentary, "Music, Place and People: the Irish Experience 1740–1940" on RTÉ's classical music channel, RTÉ lyric fm.

From 1988 to 1990, Pine was Secretary of the Irish Writers' Union and a music critic for The Irish Times. From 1990 to 1994, he was co-editor of the New York-published Irish Literary Supplement.

Between 1978 and 1988, Pine was a consultant to the Council of Europe on cultural development programmes. A seminal essay on cultural democracy was published by the Finnish Committee of UNESCO in 1982.

Pine has given guest lectures in cultural studies, literature and Irish studies at the Centre for Cultural Research, Belgrade, University of California, Berkeley, Emory (Atlanta), New York University, Georgia Southern, University of Central Florida, Centre for Irish Studies at CUA, Washington, City University (London) and the Princess Grace Library, Monaco.

In 1989 (until 2006), he was elected a Governor (trustee) of the Royal Irish Academy of Music, which, in 1998, bestowed on him a Fellowship honoris causa.

Since 1978 Pine has been a prolific author of articles and books on Irish theatre and Irish playwrights including Oscar Wilde and Brian Friel. Of Pine's book The Diviner. The Art of Brian Friel, the Nobel poet Seamus Heaney wrote "The particularity of quotation joined with the meditative, associative habit of your mind is the book's strength. It provokes a thoughtful response in return and, as such, will be a welcome addition to the critical reaction to Friel. It should deepen the sense of his complexity and modernity, while rendering a sense of those 'truths, immemorially posited'."

The Newsbrands Ireland Journalism Awards 2018 voted Richard Pine as "Critic of the Year" (for his book reviews in The Sunday Times), citing his "great erudition and fine judgement" as well as his "elegant style". In 2017 and 2021 Pine was shortlisted for the "Foreign Correspondent" category in the same awards for his "Letter from Greece" in The Irish Times.

== Greece ==
Continuing his career as a writer, Pine moved, in 2001, to the Ionian Island of Corfu in Greece to found the Durrell School of Corfu (DSC) which, for twelve years, hosted seminars on literature and the protection of the environment. The school aimed to enrich international understanding of the writings of Lawrence Durrell and his brother, the innovative ecologist and zoologist, Gerald Durrell. It closed in 2014 and was succeeded in 2016 by the Durrell Library of Corfu, an online library and website which re-commenced international seminars in 2017. In 2021 the Durrell Library initiated a "Durrell Studies" series of volumes on aspects of the lives and work of Lawrence and Gerald Durrell and on topics related to Greece, the Balkans and the Levant, published by Cambridge Scholars Publishing. Pine is a frequent guest lecturer at the Ionian University, Corfu. In 2019, he inaugurated the online "C.20 – an international journal" under the aegis of the Durrell Library of Corfu. He continues his association with the National Symphony Orchestra of Ireland as a writer of concert programme notes.

== Family ==
In 1972, Pine married Melanie Craigen. They have two daughters, Emilie Pine (born 1977), an essayist and professor of drama at University College Dublin and Vanessa Pine (born 1981), an artist and cookery writer. Pine and Craigen separated in 1983. From 1994 to 2008, Pine's partner was the concert artist and piano professor Patricia Kavanagh. In 2018, Emilie published a memoir, Notes to Self, which was voted Book of the Year in the Irish Book Awards.

== Selected reviews ==
Dublin Gate Theatre, 1928–1978

- "scholarly, fascinating, indispensable" (Terence de Vere White, Times Literary Supplement)

Oscar Wilde (1983)

- "I have never been so impressed by the squalor of Wilde's downfall" (Thomas Kilroy, The Irish Times)

Brian Friel and Ireland's Drama (1990)

- "essential reading for anyone interested in our theatre" (Thomas Kilroy, Sunday Tribune)
- "genuine intellectual passion" (Ronan Sheehan, The Irish Press)
- "a profound engagement with Friel's writing and the matter of Ireland" (Anthony Roche, Irish Literary Supplement)
- "scholarly scrupulousness, immensely well researched, a welcome book, one that does what criticism ought to do: open up a body of work, rather than close it down" (Fintan O'Toole, The Irish Times)
- "an absorbing philosophical study" (Christopher Murray, Theatre Ireland)

The Diviner: The Art of Brian Friel (1999)

- "Une étude critique majeure, aussi incontournable que l'oeuvre de Friel" (Martine Pelletier, Études irlandaises)

"Pine's empathic response to Friel, enhanced by his close personal and intellectual accord with the playwright, ensures that this is still the analysis to be reckoned with" - (Shaun Richards, Irish University Review)

"Music and Broadcasting in Ireland" (2005) - "A rich cultural history of music in Ireland" (Patricia Flynn, Irish Economic and Social History)

Charles: The Life and World of Charles Acton (2010)

- "a fine narrative, enlightened insights and meticulous research […] Pine superbly traces a cultural history of Ireland in the 20th century" (Ite O'Donovan, The Irish Times)

- The Disappointed Bridge: Ireland and the Post-Colonial World (2014): "A beautifully written and carefully researched book that offers fascinating inter-cultural connections which are bound to stimulate further thought". Tom Gallagher, Scottish Affairs (Edinburgh University Press)

Minor Mythologies as Popular Literature (2018)

- "clear, acute and surprisingly passionate […] lucid and determined, vivid and eloquent" (Jonathan Barnes, Times Literary Supplement)

"Lawrence Durrell's Endpapers and Inklings 1933–1988" (2019) "The reader cannot help feeling thankful for such an easy access to precious archival material ... erudite, all-embracing, irreverent and non-canonical" – Isabelle Keller-Privat, Miranda online journal "A Keystone work to fill out and support the arch of Durrell's genius" – Ian MacNiven, Deus Loci – The Lawrence Durrell Journal. "The compilation of these minor writings, matched with the fine editing by Pine, provides a rejuvenating literary self-portrait of Durrell's prolific artistry...An essential addition to Durrellian studies." Wayne Arnold, Journal of British Studies

"The Eye of the Xenos" (2021)

- "His argument holds good that, "though the Greek people allowed an incomplete and inadequate system to evolve ... it is in their everyday culture that their strength lies". For all his fierce critique of the troika's policy towards Greece after the crash, and his dislike of the "megalithic" aspects of today's EU, Pine's sensibility is intrinsically European (Roy Foster, Irish Times)

"The Quality of Life: essays on cultural politics 1978-2018": "this stimulating, eloquently written work" – Brian Maye, Irish Times

== Bibliography ==
- All for Hecuba: The Dublin Gate Theatre 1928–1978 (Dublin: Gate Theatre, 1978)
- Oscar Wilde (Dublin: Gill and Macmillan, 1983/97)
- The Dublin Gate Theatre 1928–1978 (Cambridge: Chadwyck-Healey, 1984)
- The Dandy and the Herald: Manners, Mind and Morals from Brummell to Durrell (London and New York: The Macmillan Press/St Martin's Press, 1988)
- Brian Friel and Ireland's Drama (London: Routledge, 1990)
- Dark Fathers into Light, ed. Brendan Kennelly (Newcastle upon Tyne: Bloodaxe Books, 1994)
- Lawrence Durrell: the Mindscape (first edition, Macmillan Press, 1994; revised edition, Durrell Library of Corfu, 2025)
- The Thief of Reason: Oscar Wilde and Modern Ireland (Dublin: Gill and Macmillan, 1995)
- Music in Ireland 1848–1998 (ed.) (Dublin and Cork: Mercier Press, 1998), Thomas Davis Lectures
- To Talent Alone: the Royal Irish Academy of Music 1848–1998 (ed. with Charles Acton) (Dublin: Gill and Macmillan, 1998)
- The Diviner: The Art of Brian Friel (Dublin: UCD Press, 1999)
- 2RN and the Origins of Irish Radio (Dublin: Four Courts Press, 2002)
- Music and Broadcasting in Ireland (Dublin: Four Courts Press, 2005)
- Creativity, Madness and Civilisation (ed.) (Newcastle upon Tyne: Cambridge Scholars Publishing, 2007) [seminar proceedings on "Madness and Creativity"]
- The Literatures of War (ed. with Eve Patten) (Newcastle upon Tyne: Cambridge Scholars Publishing, 2008)
- Nostos: Proceedings of the Durrell School of Corfu 2002–2005 (ed.) (Corfu: Durrell School of Corfu, 2008)
- Charles: The Life and World of Charles Acton 1914–1999 (Dublin: Lilliput Press, 2010)
- Theodore Stephanides, Corfu Memoirs and Poems (ed.) (Corfu: Durrell School of Corfu, 2011)
- Judith. A Novel by Lawrence Durrell (ed.) (Corfu: Durrell School of Corfu, 2012)
- The Disappointed Bridge: Ireland and the Post-Colonial World (Newcastle upon Tyne: Cambridge Scholars Publishing, 2014)
- Greece through Irish Eyes (Dublin: Liffey Press, 2015)
- Minor Mythologies as Popular Literature: A Student's Guide to Texts and Films (Cambridge Scholars Publishing, 2018)
- The Placebo by Lawrence Durrell, edited by Richard Pine and David Roessel (Colenso Books, 2018)
- Lawrence Durrell's Endpapers and Inklings 1933–1988 (ed.) (2 volumes; Cambridge Scholars Publishing, 2019; one-volume edition, Durrell Library of Corfu, 2025)
- Islands of the Mind: Psychology, Literature, Biodiversity (co-ed.) (Cambridge Scholars Publishing, 2020)
- A Writer in Corfu (Durrell Library of Corfu, 2020; bilingual edition, transl. Vera Konidari)
- Borders and Borderlands: explorations in identity, exile and translation (Cambridge Scholars Publishing, 2021, co-edited with Vera Konidari)
- Lawrence Durrell's Woven Web of Guesses (essays, Cambridge Scholars Publishing, 2021).
- The Eye of the Xenos, Letters about Greece (with Vera Konidari; Cambridge Scholars Publishing, 2021)
- The Quality of Life: essays on cultural politics 1978–2018 (Cambridge Scholars Publishing 2021)
- It All Began Here: Gerald Durrell, Theodore Stephanides and Lawrence Durrell, Corfu 1935-1939 (with Lee Durrell and Vera Konidari) (Durrell Library of Corfu, 2023)
