= Emilie Pine =

Irish writer and academic

- Born: January 27, 1977 (age 49); Dublin, Ireland
- Education: BA in English literature, Trinity College Dublin; MA in film studies, University of California, Berkeley; PhD in English, Trinity College Dublin
- Occupations: Writer; playwright; university professor
- Employer: University College Dublin
- Notable work: Notes to Self; Ruth & Pen
- Parents: Richard Pine (father); Melanie Craigen (mother)

Emilie Pine (born 1977) is an Irish writer and academic. She is Professor of Modern Drama at University College Dublin and the author of the bestselling essay collection Notes to Self and the novel Ruth & Pen. Her work spans memoir, fiction, theatre and cultural studies, and frequently addresses themes of trauma, memory, infertility, institutional abuse and women's lived experiences.

== Biography ==
Pine was born in Dublin in 1977 to Melanie Craigen and the writer and broadcaster Richard Pine. Her parents separated when she was five, and she and her younger sister Vanessa were raised primarily by their mother. Pine's childhood was marked by financial hardship and the social stigma associated with divorce in 1980s Ireland, as well as her father's struggles with alcoholism.

During her teenage years Pine moved with her family to London, where she attended a comprehensive school and later dropped out. She subsequently completed A‑levels at Mander Portman Woodward and studied English literature at Trinity College Dublin. She later earned an MA in film studies at the University of California, Berkeley, followed by a PhD in English at Trinity College Dublin.

After completing her doctorate, Pine spent a year travelling before taking up a post as lecturer in drama at the University of York. She returned to Ireland in 2008 to join University College Dublin (UCD) as a lecturer in modern drama, later becoming Associate Professor and subsequently Professor of Modern Drama. At UCD she teaches memoir, theatre, testimony and memory cultures.

== Academic work ==
Pine's academic research focuses on memory studies, testimony, institutional trauma, and the representation of suffering in literature and theatre. She is a founding member of the Irish Memory Studies Research Network and has published widely on cultural memory, performance, and the politics of representation.

Her monographs include The Politics of Irish Memory (2011), which examines how contemporary Irish culture performs remembrance, and The Body in Pain in Irish Literature and Culture (2016), a study of embodiment and suffering in Irish writing. She later published Moving Memory (2017) and The Memory Marketplace (2020), which explore witnessing, trauma and the circulation of pain in Irish and international theatre.

Pine served as principal investigator for the digital humanities project Industrial Memories, which uses computational methods to analyze the Ryan Report on institutional abuse in Ireland. Her research has been supported by multiple grants from UCD and Irish funding bodies.

== Writing career ==
Pine's debut essay collection, Notes to Self (2018), examines subjects including infertility, miscarriage, alcoholism, sexual violence and family trauma. The book became a bestseller and has been translated into sixteen languages. The collection was named the 2018 Irish Book of the Year.

Her first novel, Ruth & Pen (2022), follows two women over a single day in Dublin and incorporates structural elements associated with modernist literature, including references to Ulysses and Mrs Dalloway. The narrative addresses themes of infertility, miscarriage, autism and interpersonal care. BBC News noted Pine's continued engagement with the subject of baby loss and her use of an autistic protagonist. The novel received the 2023 Kate O’Brien Award.

Pine has also written for the stage. Her play Good Sex premiered at the Dublin Theatre Festival in 2022 and was shortlisted for Best New Play and Best Production at the Irish Times Irish Theatre Awards. She also collaborated with Anu Productions on the Ulysses 2.2 project, creating All Hardest of Woman at the National Maternity Hospital.

Pine is preparing an essay collection on rape culture, On Being Seen, scheduled for publication in 2027.

== Selected works ==
=== Books ===
- The Politics of Irish Memory (2011)
- The Body in Pain in Irish Literature and Culture (2016)
- Moving Memory (2017)
- Notes to Self (2018)
- The Memory Marketplace (2020)
- Ruth & Pen (2022)
- On Being Seen (forthcoming, 2027)

=== Theatre ===
- Good Sex (2022)
- All Hardest of Woman (2023)

== Bibliography ==
- Saunders, Emma (2022-05-04). "Emilie Pine: The novelist putting autism centre stage". BBC News.
- Conroy, Catherine (2022-04-30). "Emilie Pine: 'I miss the children I didn't have. Some people get that and some don't'". The Irish Times.
- Leonard, Sue (2018-07-30). "Emilie Pine".
- Gregorio, Josefin de (2019-06-04). "Laddad bön om att prata om det som oftast förtigs". Svenska Dagbladet.
- Josefsson, Erika (2019-08-30). "Rak uppriktighet gav Emilie Pine ny makt". Svenska Dagbladet.
- Andersson, Malin (2023-10-14). "Pine, Emilie". Alex Författarlexikon.
- "Richard Pine – Life". Ricorso. 2021.
- Woodberry, Imogen (2018-12-07). "Wounds: Review of Notes to Self". The Times Literary Supplement.
- Taylor, Catherine (2018-10-05). "Notes to Self by Emilie Pine — back in the day". Financial Times.
- Barter, Pavel (2018). "Emilie Pine: How I stopped hiding from myself". The Times.
- Bennett-Ortega, Lucía (2025). "Vulnerability and Shame in the Writing of the Female Body: Emilie Pine's Notes to Self". Alicante Journal of English Studies. 42 (42): 95–112. doi:10.14198/raei.26321. hdl:10481/104955.
- "Emilie Pine – Bio". University College Dublin.
- "Emilie Pine – Research Interests". University College Dublin.
- "Emilie Pine wins Irish Book of the Year prize". RTÉ News. 2019-01-29.
- "An Post Irish Book of the Year 2018 winner revealed". The Irish Times. 2019.
- "'You don't have to feel like this': Emilie Pine on starting HRT". The Irish Times. 2024.
- ""We are not crazy women ruled by hormones!" – Emilie Pine". The Brendan O’Connor Show. 2025-01-05. RTÉ Radio 1.
- "Kate O'Brien Award". Limerick Literary Festival.
- Gilbart, Manon (2023-02-27). "Limerick Literary Festival announces winner of the Kate O'Brien Award". Limerick Leader.
