= George Kemp-Welch =

English cricketer

Personal information
- Full name: George Durant Kemp-Welch
- Born: 4 August 1907; Chelsea, London, England
- Died: 18 June 1944 (aged 36); Guards Chapel, Wellington Barracks, London, England
- Batting: Right-handed
- Bowling: Right-arm fast-medium
- Role: Batsman

Domestic team information
- Years: Team
- 1927–1935: Warwickshire
- 1929–1931: Cambridge University
- First-class debut: 18 May 1927 Warwickshire v Middlesex
- Last First-class: 16 June 1936 Free Foresters v Cambridge University

Career statistics
Competition	First-class
Matches	114
Runs scored	4170
Batting average	24.82
100s/50s	6/18
Top score	186
Balls bowled	3110
Wickets	41
Bowling average	41.85
5 wickets in innings	–
10 wickets in match	–
Best bowling	4/41
Catches/stumpings	50/–
- Source: CricketArchive, 20 July 2015

George Durant Kemp-Welch (4 August 1907 – 18 June 1944) was an English cricketer who played first-class cricket for Warwickshire, Cambridge University, the Marylebone Cricket Club (MCC) and other amateur teams between 1927 and 1936. He was born in Chelsea, London, and died in the V1 bombing of the Guards Chapel, Wellington Barracks, in Westminster.

== Family and background ==
Kemp-Welch was the younger son of Brian Charles Durant Kemp-Welch, an executive and then managing director of the Schweppes company where his own father had been chairman and managing director. He had an older twin brother, Peter Wellesbourne, and a sister who was just a year older, Elizabeth, who won later fame under her married name of Betty Kenward, the writer of the "Jennifer's Diary" social column in Tatler. Kemp-Welch's mother, Verena Georgina (Venour), was, according to the obituary of Betty Kenward, unorthodox in her living arrangements, having a succession of affairs. The Kemp-Welches were initially based in London and then in Brighton, where they are recorded in the 1911 census; Brian Kemp-Welch then bought a country house at Kineton in Warwickshire while retaining an address in Westminster or Belgravia.

The Kemp-Welch twins were educated at Charterhouse School, and George went on to Cambridge University, where he won Blues for both cricket and association football, being captain in both sports. He came down from Cambridge in 1931. A brief announcement in The Times on 24 February 1934 indicated that a wedding would take place between Kemp-Welch and a Mrs Diana Lucy Munro (Baldwin); a further announcement on 26 February indicated that the deed had been done quietly on 24 February at Kensington Registry Office. The cause for discretion was that the bride was not only the daughter of one of the leaders of the National Government, Stanley Baldwin, but also that the bride, some twelve years Kemp-Welch's senior, had divorced her previous husband Richard Gordon Munro.

George and Diana had no children; she outlived her husband by 38 years.

== Sporting career ==
As a cricketer, Kemp-Welch was a right-handed batsman often used as an opening batsman and a right-arm fast bowler; his bowling in first-class cricket was largely confined to his first two years at Cambridge. Having left school, he played in three matches for Warwickshire as a 19-year-old in May 1927, batting low in the order and bowling very little. He did not play again in that season, but in February 1928 he was a member of an amateur-led tour to Jamaica under Lionel Tennyson that played three first-class games against the Jamaica side and although his highest score on the tour was only 38, he batted consistently and ascended the batting order, opening the innings in the final game. He again played a few matches for the Warwickshire side in the 1928 season.

In the autumn of 1928, Kemp-Welch went to Sidney Sussex College, Cambridge, and within a term he had won a Blue for football, where he played as a centre forward. As a cricketer, he did not play in the freshmen's trial match, nor in either of the first two university games of the 1929 season, and appeared in a Warwickshire game in the middle of the university term in mid-May. That sparked his selection as a lower middle-order batsman for the next two Cambridge matches, and by June he was opening the batting, and also bowling, and though he achieved little success at either – no half-centuries as a batsman, and no more than four wickets in any one innings as a bowler – he did enough to win his Blue for the University Match against Oxford University. In the match itself, he did well: he made his first score of over 50, an innings of 57 that held together a shaky opening for the Cambridge side that the later batsman were well able to build on; he took three middle-order wickets when Oxford batted. The match was drawn, but Oxford had been rated the stronger team in the build-up to the game, so Cambridge were well-satisfied. Kemp-Welch rejoined Warwickshire for a few matches after the university term was over, but did not make much impact.

Kemp-Welch's second year at Cambridge followed a similar pattern. He won a second Blue for soccer and was praised in The Times as "a first-rate constructive player in mid-field, but [also] knows how to score plenty of goals". He also played frequently for the two leading public-school amateur ad hoc football teams, Corinthian F. C. and Casuals F. C. His cricket contribution to the Cambridge side in 1930 was similar to that in 1929 with useful runs and wickets but no outstanding innings or analyses; as in 1929, some of his best work was done in the University Match, when he scored 61 and 8 and also took two wickets and two catches.

Kemp-Welch was captain of both the soccer and the cricket teams in his final year at Cambridge, and as centre-forward in the football team he was also seen as the key player on the Cambridge side in the university soccer match. In the event, the university match was drawn 1–1 in atrocious conditions with a boggy pitch and thick fog. In cricket, Kemp-Welch gave up bowling, but in the 1931 season for both Cambridge University and Warwickshire – and for other amateur teams as well – he batted far better than in any other season, finishing with an aggregate of 1561 runs at an average of 37.16. As Cambridge cricket captain, he led a team that was highly inconsistent throughout the season, yet his own form as an opening batsman was consistently good, and he scored 1111 runs during the university season, more than 2.5 times the highest aggregate of any of his team-mates; included in this total were the first three centuries of his career, the highest being 126 against the H. D. G. Leveson Gower XI just before the University Match. The inconsistency of the team as a whole lost them the University Match; Kemp-Welch's opening batsman colleague, Alan Ratcliffe, a last-minute selection for the team as he had been out of form all season, scored the first double century in the history of the University Match and put on 149 for the first wicket with Kemp-Welch, yet Cambridge still lost after Ratcliffe's innings was surpassed by the Nawab of Pataudi for Oxford and through a poor Cambridge second-innings batting performance. Following the University Match, Kemp-Welch was picked for the Gentlemen v Players match at Lord's; he played in two further Gentlemen v Players games in cricket festivals at the end of the season, and in between appeared in most of Warwickshire's fixtures.

At the start of 1932, Kemp-Welch was a member for the second time of an unofficial tour to the West Indies under Lionel Tennyson which, as in 1927–28, played three first-class matches against the Jamaica side. The first game was notable for the feat of the Jamaican sixth-wicket pair, George Headley and Clarence Passailaigue, who put on an unbeaten 487 which remains, as of 2015, the world record for that wicket; Kemp-Welch scored 105 in the Tennyson XI's reply, but the game was still lost by an innings. In the second match, Kemp-Welch himself scored 186, which was the highest score of his first-class career, though again the game was lost, Headley once more making the winning contribution. In the 1932 English cricket season, Kemp-Welch gave himself virtually a full year of first-class cricket with Warwickshire, although he also played some other games for MCC and took most of June off: he had limited success, however, and his full season's record was only 565 runs at the low average of 15.27.

== Later career ==
Kemp-Welch left full-time cricket at the end of the 1932 season, though he played in a few more first-class games in the years up to 1936, mostly for the MCC and for the itinerant Free Foresters. He returned to Warwickshire only twice in that period, but on one of those appearances, when he captained the side against Glamorgan in 1934, he made an unbeaten 123, his only century for the county.

In 1932, he had been appointed to the "West End board" of an insurance company, Scottish Union and National. In 1936, he was appointed to the board of Schweppes, his father's company.

He was commissioned as a 2nd Lt in the Grenadier Guards, service No. 131986 in 1940. By the time of his death in 1944, he had been promoted to captain. He is buried in the graveyard of St Peter's Church, Astley in Astley, Worcestershire.
