= Pioneer Club (women's club) =

The Pioneer Club was a progressive women's club founded in Regent Street, London, in 1892 by the social worker and temperance activist Emily Massingberd. "It was strongly associated with the 'higher thought' and such associated issues of the 'New Morality' of the late nineteenth century as theosophy, anti-vivisection, anti-vaccination and above all feminism."

The club was named after Walt Whitman's poem 'Pioneers! O Pioneers!', lines from which were inscribed on a glass screen in the building's hall:

We the route for travel clearing
Pioneers, O Pioneers!
All the hands of comrades clasping
Pioneers, O Pioneers!

One of the most popular of the Women's Clubs established in London in the late 19th century by 1895 membership exceeded 300. It began in Regent Street but soon moved to 22 Cork Street. Its permanent site was at 22 Bruton Street, Berkeley Square, previously the residence of Lord Hastings.

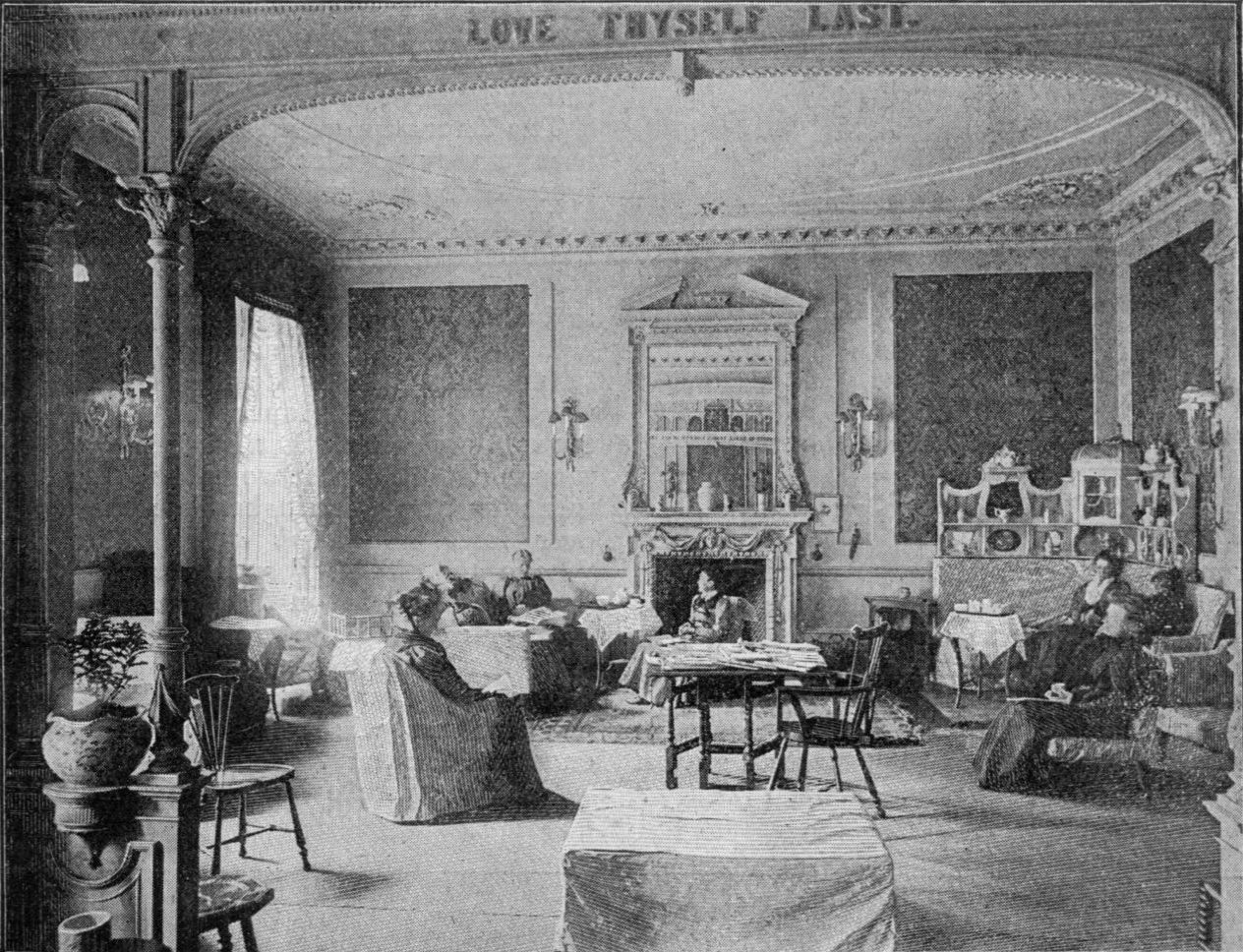
The drawing-room of the Pioneer Club. Photograph from Cassell's Magazine.

It had three drawing rooms, four bedrooms and a library. Meals were supplied to members and their guests. Lectures, debates and discussion were held on Thursday evenings on social political and literary themes.

Professional and other working women, typists, dressmakers and milliners joined. Members were called by number to underline the unimportance of social position. "99 might be a Duchess or a Post Office clerk." "On Wednesdays At Homes were given to which men were invited."

It is reported the feminist character of the club was diluted after the early death of the founder in January 1897.

In 1897, the club was due to move to 15 Grosvenor Crescent, but there was a split in membership after Massingberd's death, and many remained at the old location. The new location became the Grosvenor Crescent Club, which by 1900 was describing itself as "purely social".
