= Archibald Montgomery-Massingberd =

British Army officer who served in the Second Boer War and in the First World War

Field Marshal Sir Archibald Montgomery-Massingberd GCB GCVO KCMG DL
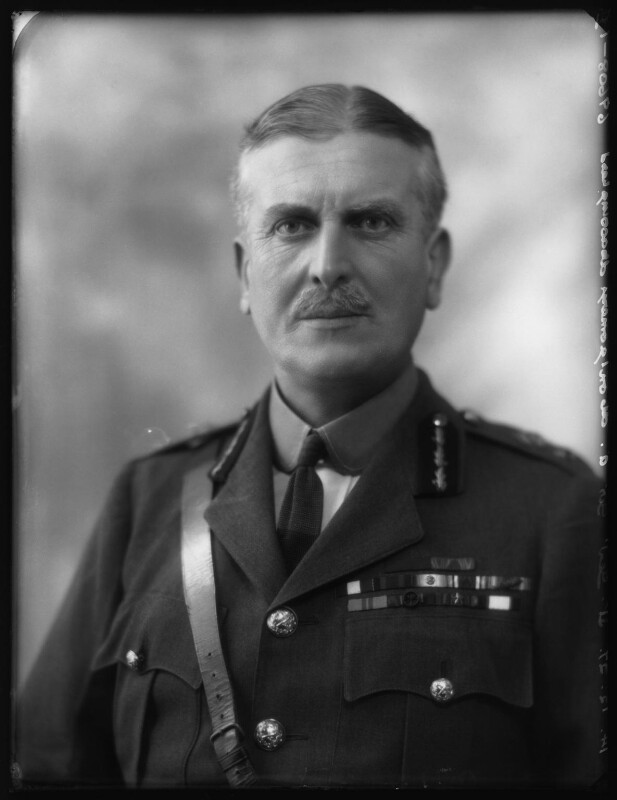
- Born: Archibald Armar Montgomery; 6 December 1871; Fivemiletown, County Tyrone
- Died: 13 October 1947 (aged 75); Spilsby, Lincolnshire
- Burial place: St. Peter's Church, Gunby
- Military career
- Allegiance: United Kingdom
- Branch: British Army
- Service years: 1891–1936
- Rank: Field Marshal
- Nickname: Archie
- Service number: 1413
- Units: Royal Field Artillery
- Commands: Chief of the Imperial General Staff; Southern Command; 1st Division; 53rd (Welsh) Division
- Conflicts: Second Boer War; First World War
- Awards: Knight Grand Cross of the Order of the Bath; Knight Grand Cross of the Royal Victorian Order; Knight Commander of the Order of St Michael and St George; Mentioned in Despatches; Distinguished Service Medal (United States)

Field Marshal Sir Archibald Armar Montgomery-Massingberd, GCB, GCVO, KCMG, DL (6 December 1871 – 13 October 1947), known as Archibald Armar Montgomery until October 1926, was a senior British Army officer who served as Chief of the Imperial General Staff (CIGS) from 1933 to 1936. He served in the Second Boer War and in the First World War, and later was the driving force behind the formation of a permanent "Mobile Division", the fore-runner of the 1st Armoured Division.

== Early life and military career ==
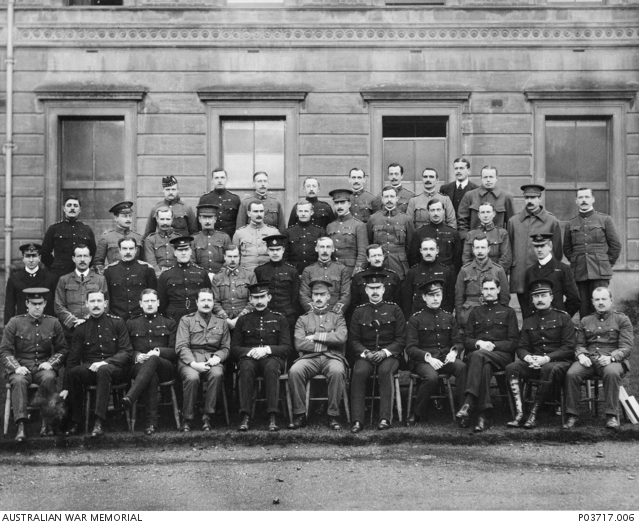
Group portrait of officers at the British Staff College at Camberley, England, 1906. Archibald Montgomery, then a captain, is stood in the back row, second on the right.

His father was Hugh de Fellenberg Montgomery, a landowner and Ulster Unionist politician, and his mother was Mary Sophia Juliana May Montgomery (née Maude). The young Montgomery was educated at Charterhouse and at the Royal Military Academy, Woolwich, and then was commissioned a second lieutenant into the Royal Field Artillery on 4 November 1891. He was posted to a field battery in India in 1892 and became a lieutenant on 4 November 1894.

He served with the RFA during the Second Boer War and took part in the Battle of Magersfontein and the Battle of Paardeberg. Having been promoted to captain on 8 March 1900, he was mentioned in despatches on 4 September 1901. He stayed in South Africa throughout the war, which ended with the Peace of Vereeniging on 31 May 1902, and returned home on the SS Saxon which arrived at Southampton in late October 1902; he was subsequently back with his regiment in January 1903.

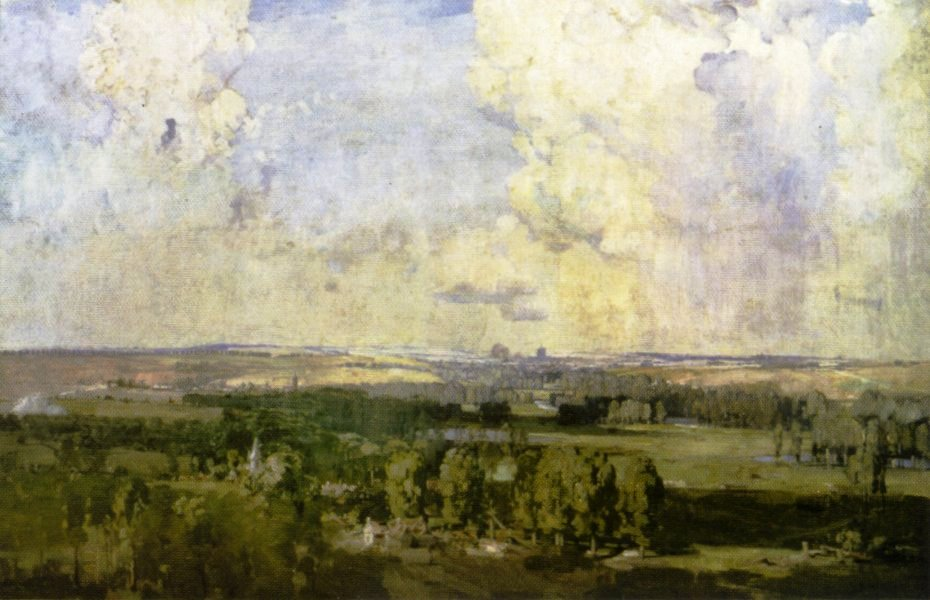
Amiens, where Montgomery-Massingberd played an important role as deputy commander of the Fourth Army during the First World War.

After the war, Montgomery served as a battery captain, and later as an adjutant in August 1904, at Bulford Camp before attending the Staff College, Camberley from 1905 to 1906. Promoted from supernumerary captain to captain in December 1905, he became a staff captain at the inspectorate of Horse and Field Artillery in December 1907 and served a general staff officer, grade 3 at Aldershot Command in August 1908. Promoted to major on 5 June 1909, he was appointed a general staff officer, grade 2 (GSO2) at the Indian Staff College at Quetta in India on 9 February 1912. He was promoted to temporary lieutenant colonel as a result of his GSO2 appointment.

== First World War ==
At the outbreak of the First World War in July 1914, Montgomery was promoted once more to temporary lieutenant colonel and appointed a general staff officer grade 2 of the 4th Division of the British Expeditionary Force, which landed in France in August. Towards the end of the following month the division was commanded, although very briefly, by Major General Sir Henry Rawlinson, "who formed a high opinion of Montgomery's abilities and thereafter retained him in his personal entourage". He was promoted to be the division's general staff officer, grade 1 in September, taking over this position from Colonel James Edward Edmonds.

He remained in this position until August 1915, during which time he received the temporary rank of colonel on 4 November 1914, brevet lieutenant colonel on 18 February 1915, and substantive lieutenant colonel on 16 May 1915. On 19 August, after being made a temporary brigadier general, he succeeded Colonel Alister Dallas as brigadier general, general staff of IV Corps, which brought him once more into contact with Rawlinson, now a lieutenant general, and with whom he would remain for the rest of the war.

He was promoted once again, now to temporary major general, on 5 February 1916 became major general, general staff of the newly created Fourth Army of the BEF in February 1916, with Rawlinson, now a full general, in command. It was a role for which, according to General Sir Douglas Haig, commander-in-chief of the BEF from December 1915 onwards, from the planning for the Battle of the Somme in 1916 he carried out with "great ability and success". Promoted to the substantive rank of major general on 1 January 1917, he was appointed a Companion of the Order of the Bath for his services in the field on 1 January 1918.

Rawlinson was, in January 1918, appointed as the British military representative on the newly created Supreme War Council and took Montgomery with him to serve on his new staff. After the German spring offensive was launched in March, and after once more being placed in command of the Fourth Army, Montgomery once more resumed his old role of MGGS. He was effectively deputy commander of the Fourth Army (deputising for Rawlinson) in the final months of the war and played an important role in the success of the Battle of Amiens in August 1918. He was appointed a Knight Commander of the Order of St Michael and St George for his services in connection with military operations in France and Flanders on 1 January 1919 and was also awarded the American Distinguished Service Medal by the President of the United States on 12 July 1919. The medal's citation reads:

The President of the United States of America, authorized by Act of Congress, July 9, 1918, takes pleasure in presenting the Army Distinguished Service Medal to Major General Archibald A. Montgomery, Royal British Army, for exceptionally meritorious and distinguished service in a position of great responsibility to the Government of the United States, during World War I. As Chief of Staff of the 4th British Army, General Montgomery directed the operations of the 2d American Army Corps with distinguished ability, displaying military attainments of the highest order. The officers and soldiers of the 27th, 30th, and 33d U.S. Divisions are justly proud of having served with their English comrades against the common foe and of having shared with them in the successes which were due, in no small degree, to his capable direction.

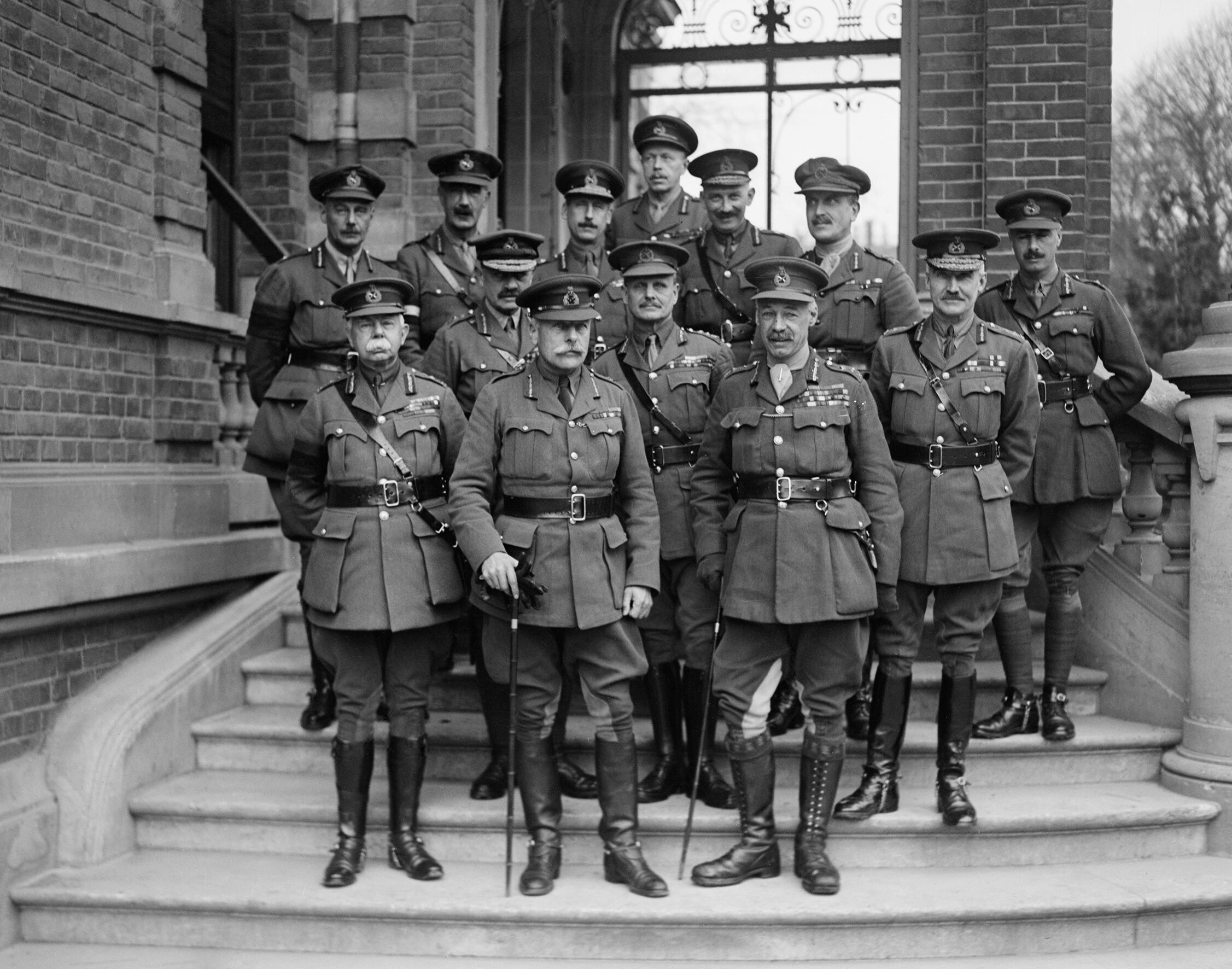
Sir Douglas Haig with his army commanders and their chiefs of staff, November 1918. Front row, left to right: Sir Herbert Plumer, Sir Douglas Haig, Sir Henry Rawlinson. Middle row, left to right: Sir Julian Byng, Sir William Birdwood, Sir Henry Horne. Back row, left to right: Sir Herbert Lawrence, Sir Charles Kavanagh, Brudenell White, Percy, Louis Vaughan, Archibald Montgomery-Massingberd, Hastings Anderson.

== Between the wars ==
In April 1919, after the armistice of 11 November 1918 which ended the fighting, Montgomery was appointed chief of the general staff of the British Army of the Rhine, under General Sir William Robertson. He was then deputy chief of the general staff in India on 27 March 1920, before becoming GOC of the 53rd (Welsh) Division, a Territorial Army formation stationed in the UK, on 3 March 1922. He became GOC 1st Division, in succession to Major General Sir Guy Bainbridge, at Aldershot on 4 June 1923 and, having been advanced to Knight Commander of the Order of the Bath in the 1925 New Year Honours, he was promoted to lieutenant general on 16 March 1926. Following a two-year break on half-pay, he became GOC-in-C Southern Command on 17 June 1928. Promoted to full general on 1 October 1930, he was appointed Adjutant-General to the Forces on 1 March 1931 and made aide-de-camp general to the King on 3 March 1931.

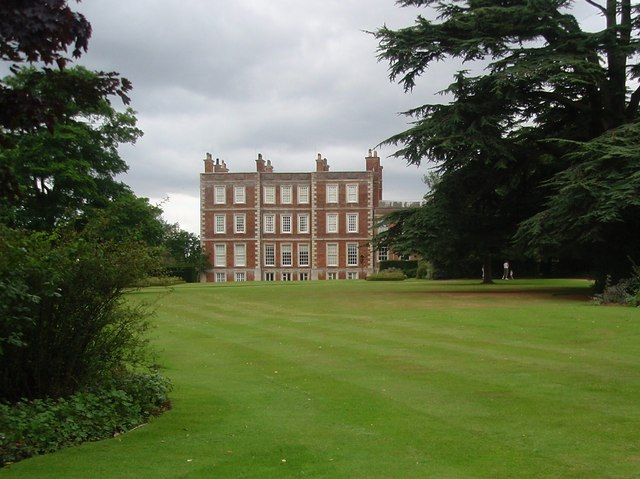
Gunby Hall, Montgomery-Massingberd's home in Lincolnshire.

Montgomery-Massingberd was appointed Chief of the Imperial General Staff (CIGS) in February 1933. Among his main achievements at this time was the mechanising of the cavalry: indeed he was the driving force behind the formation of a permanent "Mobile Division". Despite this, according to Williamson and Millett, he was a great obstacle to innovation of mechanized forces and suppressed the analysis of the British Army's performance in the First World War initiated by his predecessor, Lord Milne. Advanced to Knight Grand Cross of the Order of the Bath in the King's Birthday Honours 1934, he was made a field marshal on 7 June 1935. Following the death of King George V he took part in the funeral procession in January 1936 and then retired in March 1936.

Montgomery-Massingberd was also colonel commandant of the Royal Regiment of Artillery from 19 November 1927, Colonel Commandant of the Royal Tank Corps from 7 December 1934, Colonel Commandant of the 20th Burma Rifles from 5 April 1935, Honorary Colonel of the 46th (Lincolnshire Regiment) Anti-Aircraft Battalion, Royal Engineers, from 17 March 1937 and Colonel Commandant of the Royal Malta Artillery from 11 May 1937.

In retirement Montgomery-Massingberd became deputy lieutenant and then vice-lieutenant of the County of Lincoln. During the Second World War the Air Ministry attempted to build an airfield at Great Steeping in Lincolnshire that would have extended into Sir Archibald's wife's traditional family estate, necessitating the demolition of the magnificent mansion of Gunby Hall. He personally appealed to King George VI and the Air Ministry relented, redrawing the plans that resulted in the resiting of the new RAF Spilsby two miles further south. During the Second World War he also took charge of organizing and recruiting the Home Guard in Lincolnshire for nine months. His major passion in life was horsemanship. He died at the age of 75 at his home, Gunby Hall, on 13 October 1947 and was buried at St. Peter's Church in Gunby.

== Family ==
In 1896 Archibald Montgomery married Diana Langton Massingberd. They had no children. In October 1926, his wife inherited Massingberd family estates, and he changed his name by Royal Licence to add her name to his own. Thus, references to him as "Montgomery-Massingberd" during the First World War are anachronistic. The journalist and genealogist Hugh Massingberd was a great-nephew of both the field marshal and, independently, the field marshal's wife, and in 1963 he and his father also adopted the Massingberd name to inherit the same estates.

== Bibliography ==
- Harris, J.P. (1995). Men, Ideas and Tanks: British Military Thought and Armoured Vehicles 1903–1939. Manchester University Press.
- Heathcote, Tony (1999). The British Field Marshals 1736–1997. Barnsley (UK): Pen & Sword. ISBN 0-85052-696-5.
- Montgomery-Massingberd, Archibald (1919). The Story of the Fourth Army in the Hundred Days. Hodder & Stoughton. ASIN B000TXVIJ0.
- Montgomery-Massingberd, Hugh (1997). Archie – A Biographical sketch of Field Marshal Sir Archibald Montgomery-Massingberd. National Trust.
- Murray, Williamson; Millett, Allen R., eds. (2006) [1996]. Military Innovation in the Interwar Period (17th ed.). Cambridge: Cambridge University Press. ISBN 978-0-521-63760-2.

Military offices
Preceded by Cyril Deverell	GOC 53rd (Welsh) Division; 1922–1923	Succeeded by Thomas Marden
Preceded by Guy Bainbridge	GOC 1st Division; 1923–1926	Succeeded by Sir Cecil Romer
Preceded by Sir Alexander Godley	GOC-in-C Southern Command; 1928–1931	Succeeded by Sir Cecil Romer
Preceded by Sir Walter Braithwaite	Adjutant-General to the Forces; 1931–1933	Succeeded by Sir Cecil Romer
Preceded by Sir George Milne	Chief of the Imperial General Staff; 1933–1936	Succeeded by Sir Cyril Deverell
