= Burke's Peerage =

British genealogical publisher

Burke's Peerage Limited
- Type: Private limited company
- Industry: Publishing
- Predecessor: Burke's Peerage (1826) Limited (2013–2016)
- Founded: 1826; 200 years ago in London, England
- Founder: John Burke
- Headquarters: Bury St Edmunds, Suffolk, England
- Website: burkespeerage.com

Burke's Peerage Limited is a British genealogical publisher, considered an authority on the order of precedence of noble families and information on the lesser nobility of the United Kingdom. It was founded in 1826, when the Anglo-Irish genealogist John Burke began releasing books devoted to the ancestry and heraldry of the peerage, baronetage, knightage and landed gentry of Great Britain and Ireland. His first publication, a Genealogical and Heraldic Dictionary of the Peerage and Baronetage of the United Kingdom, was updated sporadically until 1847, when the company began publishing new editions every year as Burke's Peerage, Baronetage and Knightage (often shortened and known as Burke's Peerage).

Other books followed, including Burke's Landed Gentry, Burke's Colonial Gentry, and Burke's General Armory. In addition to its peerage publications, the Burke's publishing company produced books on Royal families of Europe and Latin America, ruling families of Africa and the Middle East, distinguished families of the United States and historical families of Ireland.

== History ==
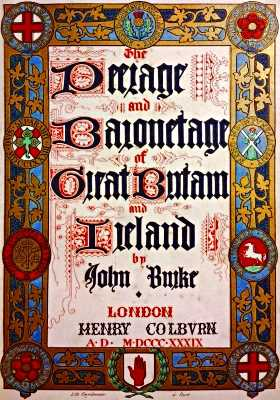
A Genealogical and Heraldic Dictionary of the Peerage and Baronetage of the British Empire, Sixth Edition 1839 (better known simply as Burke's Peerage)

The firm was established in 1826 by John Burke (1786–1848), progenitor of a dynasty of genealogists and heralds. His son Sir John Bernard Burke (1814–1892) was Ulster King of Arms (1853–1892) and his grandson, Sir Henry Farnham Burke (1859–1930), was Garter Principal King of Arms (1919–1930). After his death, ownership passed through a variety of people.

Apart from the Burke family, editors have included Arthur Charles Fox-Davies, Alfred Trego Butler, Leslie Gilbert Pine, Peter Townend, and Hugh Montgomery-Massingberd.

From 1974 to 1983, Jeremy Norman was chairman of the company, taking the role while Hugh Montgomery-Massingberd was editor. His fellow directors included Remington Norman, Patrick, Lord Lichfield, and John Brooke-Little, Norroy & Ulster King of Arms. Under Norman's chairmanship, new volumes were published on royal families, Irish genealogy, and country houses of the British Isles. In 1984, the Burke's Peerage titles were separated and sold: Burke's Peerage itself was acquired by Frederik Jan Gustav Floris, Baron van Pallandt, while Burke's Landed Gentry and other titles were sold to other buyers.

== Criticism ==
In 1877, the Oxford professor Edward Augustus Freeman criticised the accuracy of Burke's and said that it contained pedigrees that were

purely mythical – if indeed mythical is not too respectable a name for what must be in many cases the work of deliberate invention [... and] all but invariably false. As a rule, it is not only false, but impossible [...] not merely fictions, but exactly that kind of fiction which is, in its beginning, deliberate and interested falsehood.

Oscar Wilde in the play A Woman of No Importance wrote: "You should study the Peerage, Gerald. It is the one book a young man about town should know thoroughly, and it is the best thing in fiction the English have ever done!" In 1901, the historian J. Horace Round wrote of Burke's "old fables" and "grotesquely impossible tales".

More recent editions have been more scrupulously checked and rewritten for accuracy, notably under the chief editorship, from 1949 to 1959, of L. G. Pine and Hugh Massingberd (1971–1983). Pine was particularly sceptical regarding many families' claims to antiquity, saying: "If everybody who claims to have come over with the Conqueror were right, William must have landed with 200,000 men-at-arms instead of about 12,000."

== See also ==
- Almanach de Gotha
- The Complete Peerage
- Debrett's Peerage & Baronetage
- Social Register
- Carnet Mondain
- International Register of Arms, formerly Burke's Peerage & Gentry International Register of Arms
