= Theodore Blake Wirgman =

English painter

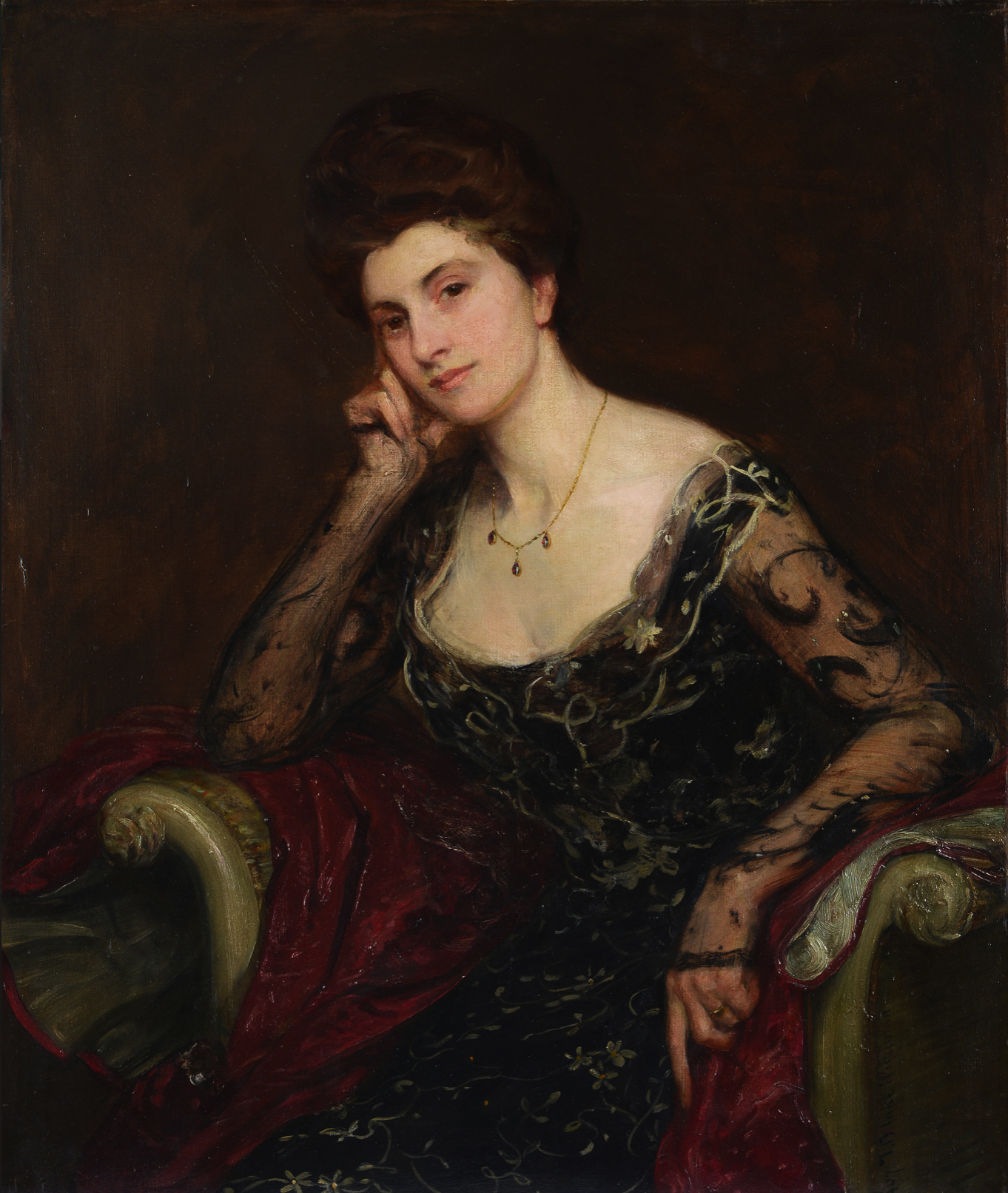
Portrait of Winifred Layard, 1907. Courtesy of Maddalena Di Giacomo Foundation.

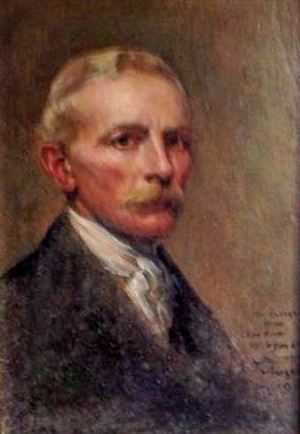
Self-portrait ~1912 (Theodore Blake Wirgman)

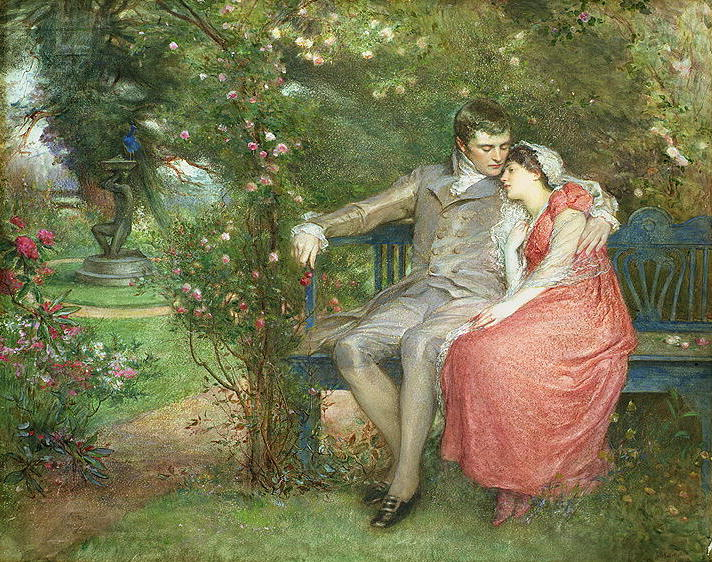
Gather Ye Rosebuds While Ye May (1905) by Wirgman

Theodore Blake Wirgman (29 April 1848 – 16 January 1925) was a British painter and etcher who moved to London, studied at the Royal Academy Schools, became a painter of history and genre subjects, and worked as a portrait artist for The Graphic. A number of these portraits are held at the National Portrait Gallery.

== Early life and family ==
Theodore Blake Wirgman was born in Belgium and died in London. He and his siblings, Charles Wirgman (1832–1891), Thomas Ernest (1834–1907), Francis Wirgman (1837–1860), Clara Emma (1841-1905), Helen Augusta (1843-1906), George Ferdinand (1845–1923) and Arthur David (1846–1925), were the sons of Ferdinand Charles Wirgman Russell (1806–1858) and Frances Letitia Diggins (1812–1891). The Wirgman ancestral family had been successful silversmiths who had come to London from Sweden early in the 18th century. Thomas Wirgman Upjohn, Theodore Blake's grandfather, wrote books on Kant, the German philosopher. Several of Theodore Blake's siblings died in infancy. His sister Clara E. married into the French family Thevenard, and his brother George F. emigrated to Uruguay, and had 16 children with Celedonia Guerrero Muñoz.

Wirgman began his formal art education at the Royal Academy at the age of fifteen. His early career saw him working in Paris for a time, but he eventually returned to London, where he established a reputation as a skilled portrait artist.

== Career ==
He worked from a studio at 24 Dawson Place, Notting Hill, London, and joined The Arts Club in 1892.

Wirgman was part of a group of avant-garde young artists who emulated Edward Burne-Jones and Simeon Solomon. This group was made up of Walter Crane, Robert Bateman, Harry Ellis Wooldridge and Edward Clifford.

Among Wirgman’s most notable works is "Peace with Honour", which depicts Queen Victoria and Disraeli in the visitors’ sitting room at Osborne House in July 1878, following the signing of the Berlin Treaty. In 1884, he sought permission to study what was believed to be the Drawing Room, resulting in an engraving of the painting that became widely popular. This work, now part of the Royal Collection, underscores Wirgman’s ability to immortalize pivotal moments in British history.
