= Gunby Hall =

Historic country house in Lincolnshire, England

Coordinates: 53.1788°N 0.1938°E

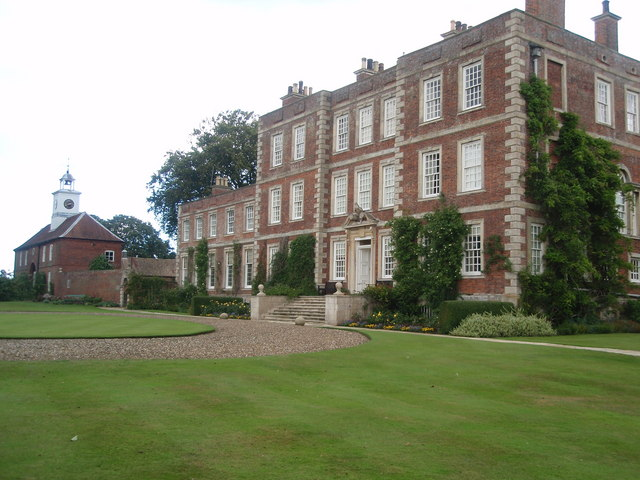
Gunby Hall

Gunby Hall is a country house in Gunby, near Spilsby, in Lincolnshire, England, reached by a one-half-mile-long (800 m) private drive. The Estate comprises the 42-room Gunby Hall, listed Grade I, a clocktower, listed Grade II* and a carriage house and stable block which are listed Grade II. In 1944 the trustees of the Gunby Hall Estate, Lady Montgomery-Massingberd, Major Norman Leith-Hay-Clarke and Field Marshal Sir Archibald Montgomery-Massingberd, gave the house to the National Trust together with its contents and some 1,500 acres (610 ha) of land.

== Description ==
"Gunby is on the edge of the Lincolnshire Wolds, near Spilsby, some eight miles (13 km) from Skegness and not far from Tennyson's home at Somersby. It was of Gunby that Tennyson wrote the lines a haunt of ancient peace."

The house is built from red brick, and was constructed in 1700 for Sir William Massingberd. Many of the interiors of the house are wood panelled, and it has 8 acres (3.2 ha) of Victorian walled gardens, which contain traditional English flowers, fruits and vegetables. The Hall is a Grade I listed building. It was substantially extended in 1873 and again in 1898 with the addition of the North Wing and Clock Tower.

The Hall contains significant collections of art, furniture, porcelain and silver including original pieces by Sir Joshua Reynolds, Edward Lear, William Morris, Lord Tennyson, William Holman Hunt, James Boswell, Samuel Johnson, Thomas Sheraton and Lucio Rannuci.

=== Park and gardens ===
Surrounding the hall is a 100-acre (40 ha) park, listed as being of historical significance and laid out in the style of Lancelot "Capability" Brown. Around that is a farmed estate of 1,500 acres (610 ha). The estate used to extend to many thousands of acres and reached the coast at what is now Skegness. Land was sold in the 19th century to the Earl of Scarbrough who built the town of Skegness to satisfy increasing demand from tourism created by the expansion of the railways.

The gardens are laid out in an informal English style with large Victorian walled and kitchen gardens, lawns, an arboretum and carp pond believed to be older than the main hall. There are 50 types of apple tree, 21 of pear and over 50 types of rose in the gardens. There is also a 17th-century dove cote, a grass tennis court, croquet pitch, cottage, apple store and studio.

On the edge of the formal gardens and within the Park lies St Peter's Church. Rebuilt on medieval foundations in the 1870s, the Church is accessible only through the Hall's gardens but it remains the active Parish Church of Gunby with a service once a month.

== History ==
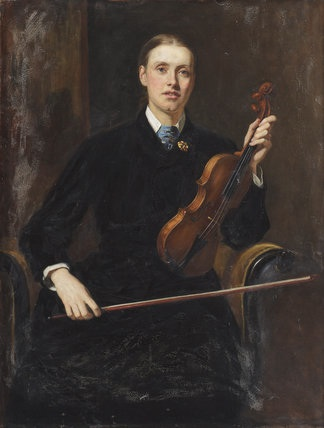
Emily Caroline Langton Massingberd Langton (1878), whose daughter and son-in-law gave the Gunby estate, including 1500 acres, to the National Trust during the Second World War

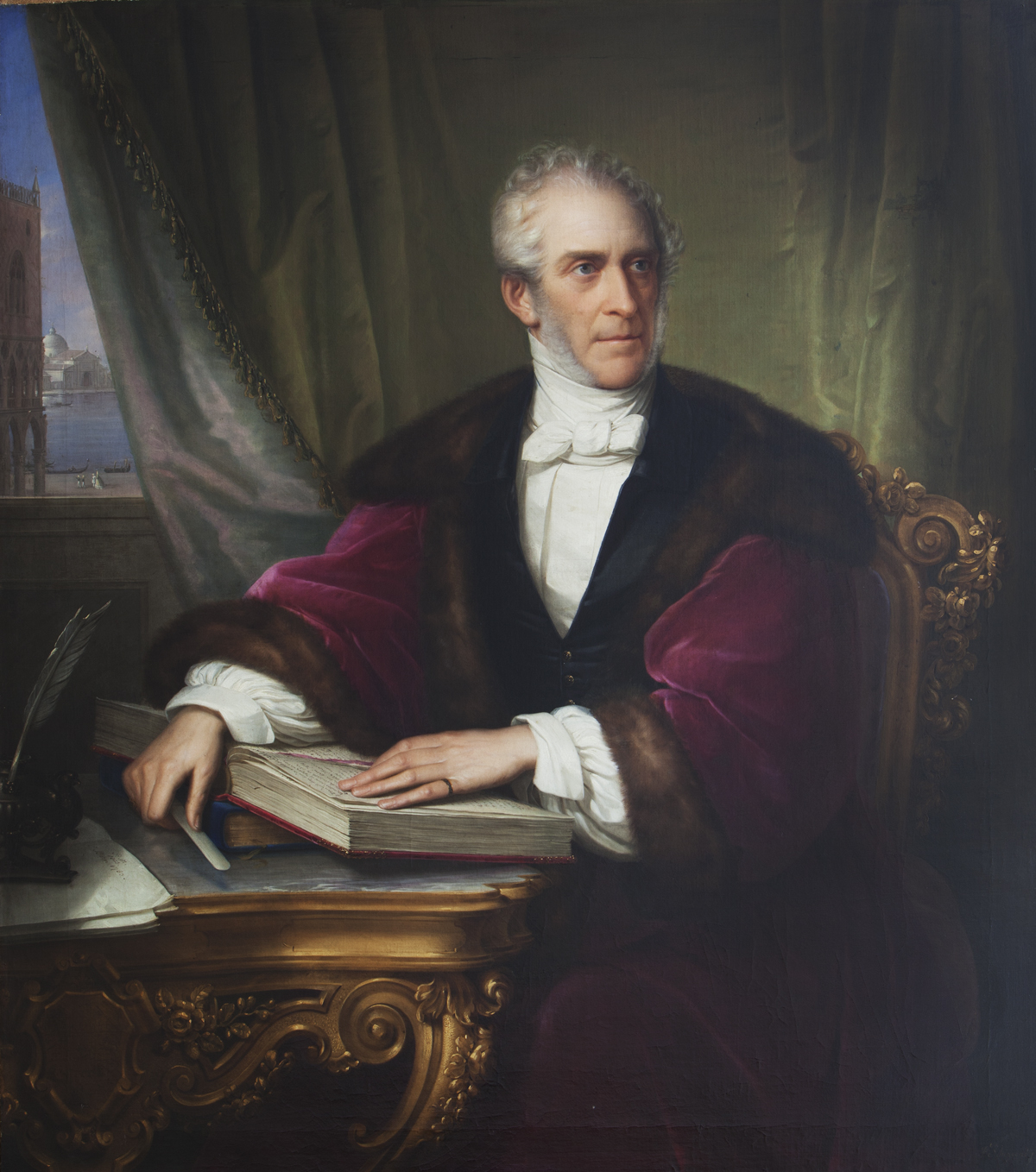
Peregrine Langton Massingberd (1780–1858), who married Elizabeth Mary Anne Massingberd in 1802 and inherited Gunby Hall.

The house was originally built in 1700 for Sir William Massingberd, 2nd Baronet, on the site of a small manor house that had once belonged to a family called Gunby. The stable block was built in 1735 by Massingberd's nephew and heir William Meux-Massingberd. A two-storey, five-bay extension wing was added in two stages in the late nineteenth century. William owned the house until 1781, after which it passed to his grandson Henry, who lived away and died in France in 1784. From him it passed to his daughter Elizabeth Mary Anne Massingberd who had married Peregrine Langton (afterwards Peregrine Langton Massingberd).

The hall descended in the Langton/Massingberd family to Lady Montgomery-Massingberd (1873–1963), born Diana Langton, who had married Archibald Montgomery, who thereupon changed his name to Montgomery-Massingberd. She and her husband donated the Hall to the National Trust in 1944.

Gunby Hall and Gardens are opened to the public by the National Trust.

== Murder and haunting ==
Gunby Hall is allegedly haunted, and the sightings have been linked with rumours of a brutal murder that occurred during Sir William Massingberd's residency. Sir William discovered that his daughter (some accounts say his wife) was about to run away with one of the servants, a postillion. On the night the lovers intended to flee, Sir William hid in waiting and shot the postillion dead. The servant's body was dragged through the grounds and thrown into the pond. Some accounts say that Sir William was so enraged he shot his daughter dead as well. Word of the secret murder must have got out because soon locals were whispering that Gunby Hall was cursed and that no male of Massingberd's descent would ever inherit the house. The ghostly form of the murdered servant has been seen haunting the path by the pond, now called 'Ghost Walk', eternally waiting for his lover.
