= L. G. Pine =

British writer, genealogist, heraldist, and editor

Leslie Gilbert Pine FSA Scot FRSA
- L. G. Pine, 1958
- Born: December 22, 1907; Bristol, England
- Died: May 15, 1987; Suffolk, England
- Education: BA (Hons), University of London
- Occupations: Writer, lecturer, genealogist, heraldist
- Known for: Editor of Burke's Peerage; contributor to Encyclopædia Britannica
- Spouse: Grace Violet Griffin (m. 1948)
- Children: Richard Pine

Leslie Gilbert Pine (22 December 1907 – 15 May 1987) was a British editor, genealogist, heraldist, and author. Best known for his tenure as editor and executive director of Burke's Peerage from 1946 to 1960, he wrote extensively on family history, the peerage, heraldry, and British social traditions, publishing more than thirty books and contributing hundreds of articles to reference works, newspapers, and journals.

During World War II, Pine served as a squadron leader in RAF Intelligence. In his post-war career, he edited major reference works including Burke's Landed Gentry, served briefly as managing director of Shooting Times—resigning on ethical grounds due to his opposition to blood sports—and was a prominent Anglican lay reader and commentator on social hierarchy and animal welfare.

== Early life and education ==
Pine was born in Bristol, the son of Henry Moorshead Pine, a grocer, and Lillian Grace Beswetherick. He was educated at Tellisford House School, Bristol, the South West London College at Barnes, and at the University of London, where he earned a BA with honours. Pine possessed wide linguistic ability, reading Latin, Greek, French, Spanish and Italian, and developed early interests in Roman history, religion, heraldry and genealogy.

== Military service ==
During World War II Pine served in Royal Air Force Intelligence, seeing service in North Africa, Italy, Greece and India. He received the Africa Star, Italy Star and Defence Medal. Pine retired from the RAF in 1946 with the rank of Squadron Leader. (Note: Pine's official RAF service record is held at The National Archives (AIR 85/28901), listing his service number as 1643417.)

== Editing and writing career ==
=== Editor ===
Pine began his career at Burke's Peerage Ltd, serving as assistant editor from 1935 to 1940. After the Second World War he returned as executive director from 1946 to 1960. During this period he oversaw and edited successive editions of Burke's Peerage, Baronetage and Knightage and Burke's Landed Gentry, the firm's principal genealogical and heraldic reference works.

In the early 1960s Pine served as managing director of Shooting Times, a British fieldsports magazine. Pine resigned from Shooting Times on ethical grounds, objecting to aspects of fieldsports culture that conflicted with his religious and ethical convictions.

He later became active in the Augustan Society, serving as a fellow, director, and member of its board of governors, and editing several of its genealogical and heraldic publications.

From 1975 to 1980 he undertook additional editorial work for the National Message, the journal of the British-Israel-World Federation. He was assistant editor from 1975 to 1977 and editor from 1977 to 1980, and served as chairman of its associated publisher, Covenant Publishing Co. Ltd, from 1978 to 1979.

=== Author ===
Pine wrote extensively on family history, the peerage, surname studies, heraldry, the monarchy of the United Kingdom, and British social traditions. Over the course of his career he produced more than thirty books and monographs, ranging from practical genealogical guides to interpretive studies of noble institutions, heraldic practice, and social hierarchy. Several of his works also offered commentary on class structure and inherited status.

Pine also contributed more than two thousand articles to newspapers and journals in Britain and the United States, including work for Encyclopædia Britannica, The Times, and The Washington Post.

== Honours and affiliations ==
Pine held fellowships in several learned societies, including the Society of Antiquaries of Scotland (FSAScot), the Ancient Monuments Society (Fellow), the Chartered Institute of Journalists (Life Fellow), the Royal Society of Arts (FRSA), and the Augustan Society (Fellow and Honorary Chairman of the Board). (Note: Although Pine is not listed as a barrister in Who Was Who, the obituary in The Augustan records that he was called to the Bar at the Inner Temple in 1953, though he does not appear in the Inner Temple's membership archive.)

Within the civic institutions of the City of London, he was made a Freeman of the City of London and served as a Liveryman of the Worshipful Company of Glaziers and Painters of Glass. (Note: Pine's association with the Glaziers' Company reflected his interest in heraldic stained glass; see for example, his article “Heraldry in Stained Glass” in The Journal of Stained Glass (1952–1953).)

== Personal life ==
=== Politics ===
Politically, Pine was initially associated with the Conservative Party. He was adopted as prospective parliamentary candidate for Bristol Central in 1956, contested the seat in the 1959 general election, and was re-adopted in 1960. He resigned his candidature in 1962 and joined the Liberal Party, becoming prospective Liberal candidate for South Croydon in 1963. He resigned that candidature in June 1964, later concluding that he had “ceased to find common ground with Liberalism”.

=== Religion ===
Pine was received into the Catholic Church in 1964, but was reconciled to the Church of England in 1971. He served as an Anglican lay reader in the dioceses of London (from 1939), Canterbury (from 1961), and St Edmundsbury and Ipswich (from 1975).

Pine upheld the Book of Common Prayer as the doctrinal and liturgical standard of the Church of England and criticised the modernising tendencies represented by the 1980 Alternative Service Book.

=== Animal welfare ===
In mid-life Pine revised his views on animal welfare, turning against blood sports after his work in fieldsports journalism. In his book After Their Blood (1966) he denounced hunting as cruelty incompatible with Christian duty, writing that "it is our duty as men and women of God's redeemed creation to try not to increase the suffering of the world, but to lessen it". He later expanded his critique of hunting in The History of Hunting (1973), arguing against the view that hunting persisted because of humanity's evolutionary past and describing it as "a relic of a remote past".

=== Family, interests and death ===
In 1948 Pine married Grace Violet Griffin (20 August 1914 – 5 November 2019), daughter of Albert Griffin and Margaret Emily (née Stowers) of Chelmsford. Their only child, Richard Pine, was born in London on 21 August 1949.

In the 1980s he lived at Hall Lodge Cottage in Brettenham, near Ipswich, and belonged to the Press Club and the Wig and Pen Club, both long-established London clubs associated with journalists, writers and members of the legal profession. Pine listed his recreations as reading, walking, gardening, travel, motoring and writing.

Pine died in Bury St Edmunds, Suffolk, on 15 May 1987.

== Legacy ==
Pine's works helped popularise family history in Britain and the United States, and his editorial reforms at Burke's Peerage shaped modern genealogical standards. His books remained widely used by genealogists, heraldists, and social historians, and his ethical writings on animal welfare influenced later debates on blood sports.

== Works ==
Pine edited numerous volumes and was the author of more than thirty books. The following lists are drawn from the Burke's Peerage Ltd catalogue, the British Library catalogue, the Library of Congress catalogue, WorldCat, the New York Public Library catalogue, his biographical entry in Who Was Who, and his obituary in the Augustan Society Omnibus.

=== Edited volumes ===
Pine edited the following volumes for Burke's Peerage Ltd.

- Burke's Landed Gentry, 16th edition (1939)
- Burke's Peerage, Baronetage and Knightage, 99th edition (1949)
- Burke's Landed Gentry, 17th edition (1952)
- Burke's Peerage, Baronetage and Knightage, 100th edition (1953)
- Supplement to Burke's Landed Gentry (1954)
- Burke's Peerage, Baronetage and Knightage, 101st edition (1956)
- Burke's Genealogical and Heraldic History of the Landed Gentry of Ireland (1958)
- Burke's Peerage, Baronetage and Knightage, 102nd edition (1959)
- Burke's Distinguished Families of America (1939; 1947)
- The International Year Book and Statesmen's Who's Who (1953–1962)

Pine edited the following volumes for Shaw Publishing Company. Shaw was commercially linked to Burke's, sharing editorial staff.

- Author's & Writer's Who's Who & Reference Guide (1948)
- Who's Who in the Free Churches (1951)
- Who's Who in Music (1949)
- The Musicians' International Directory and Biographical Record (1949–1950)

=== Authored books and manuscripts ===
Unless noted, all published titles are listed in major library catalogues, including the British Library, the New York Public Library, and WorldCat.

==== 1940s ====
- The History of the Stuarts, Earls of Traquair, Barons Linton & Cabarston, and Charles Edward Traquair Stuart‑Linton (1940). London; 27‑page booklet (British Library, New York Public Library; typescript).
- The House of Wavell (1948). London; 37‑page booklet (British Library; typescript).

==== 1950s ====
- The Middle Sea: A Short History of the Mediterranean (1950). E. Stanford.
- The Genealogist's Encyclopedia (1952; rev. ed. 1969/1970). David & Charles; Collier (US).
- Trace Your Ancestors (1953; 2nd ed. 1954; 3rd ed. 1964). Evans Brothers.
- American Origins: Sources of Genealogical Study in Europe (1953; US edn 1960). Genealogical Publishing Co.
- The Golden Book of the Coronation (1953). Associated Newspapers.
- They Came with the Conqueror: A Study of the Modern Descendants of the Normans (1954). Evans Brothers.
- Tales of the British Aristocracy (1956). Burke Publishing.
- The Story of the Peerage (1956). W. Blackwood.
- House of Constantine (1957). Alcuin Press.
- The Twilight of Monarchy (1958). Burke Publishing.
- The Story of Heraldry (1952; rev. 1963, 1967). Country Life / Tuttle (US).
- Teach Yourself Heraldry and Genealogy (1957). English Universities Press.
- The Story of Surnames (1958). Country Life / Tuttle (US).
- Written and Spoken Guide to Titles and Forms of Address (1959). Elliot Right Way Books.
- Your Family Tree (1959; rev. 1962). H. Jenkins.
- The Clan Donald (Announced 1959; status uncertain).

==== 1960s ====
- Orders of Chivalry and Decorations of Honour of the World (c. 1960). (Announced 1959; status uncertain).
- Ramshackledom: A Critical Appraisement of the Establishment (1962). Secker & Warburg.
- Heraldry Today (1962). Country Life.
- The Highland Clans (1964; rev. 1972). David & Charles.
- Heraldry, Ancestry and Titles: Questions and Answers (1965). Gramercy (US).
- After Their Blood (1966). Kimber.
- Tradition and Custom in Modern Britain (1967). Whiting & Wheaton.
- The New Extinct Peerage (1967). Genealogical Publishing Co.
- The Genealogist's Encyclopaedia (1969, revised edition). Collier / David & Charles.
- The Story of Titles: How the King became His Majesty (1969). Tuttle (US).

==== 1970s ====
- Princes of Wales (1970). Tuttle.
- International Heraldry (1970). Tuttle.
- Sons of the Conqueror (1973). Tuttle.
- The History of Hunting (1973). League Against Cruel Sports.

==== 1980s ====
- A Dictionary of Mottoes (1983). Routledge & Kegan Paul.
- A Dictionary of Nicknames (1984). Routledge & Kegan Paul.
- The Compleat Family Historian (1987). (Listed in bibliographies).

== Sources ==
- Boddice, Rob (2008). "Manliness and the "Morality of Field Sports": E. A. Freeman and Anthony Trollope, 1869–71". The Historian. 70 (1): 1–29. JSTOR 24454289.
- "Burke's Peerage – Company Bibliography". Burke's Peerage Ltd. 2024.
- Encyclopædia Britannica. Encyclopædia Britannica, Inc. 1960.
- "British Library Catalogue". British Library. 2024.
- "England and Wales Census, 1911". FamilySearch. 1911.
- Hartwell, Rodney (1987). "Leslie G. Pine, FAS, 1907–1987". The Augustan Society Omnibus 8. The Augustan Society. pp. 268–269.
- Burke's Genealogical and Heraldic History of the Landed Gentry of Ireland. Burke's Peerage Ltd. 1958.
- "Library of Congress Catalogue". Library of Congress. 2024.
- Peterle, Tony J. (1977). "Hunters, Hunting, Anti-Hunting". Wildlife Society Bulletin. 5 (4): 151–161. JSTOR 3781900.
- Pine, L. G. (1962). Ramshackledom: A Critical Appraisement of the Establishment. Secker & Warburg.
- Pine, L. G. (1966). After Their Blood. Secker & Warburg.
- Pine, Leslie Gilbert (2021). "Why They Kill". Wildlife Guardian.
- Pine, L. G. (1973). The History of Hunting. London: League Against Cruel Sports. ISBN 0904204006.
- "The history of Shooting Times". ShootingUK. 2007.
- "Obituary: Leslie Gilbert Pine". The Times. 18 May 1987.
- "Who Was Who". A & C Black. 1981.
- "WorldCat". OCLC. 2024.
- "New York Public Library Catalogue". New York Public Library. 2024.
- "Service record: L. G. Pine". The National Archives.
