= Haroshet =

Haroshet or Harosheth (Hebrew: חרושת, "smithy") may refer to:

- Kiryat Haroshet, now part of Kiryat Tiv'on, Israel
- Harosheth Haggoyim, fortress in middle East described in the Book of Judges

== See also ==
- Haroset (Hebrew: חרוסת), Jewish sweet paste
