= Henry Moore (painter) =

English marine and landscape painter

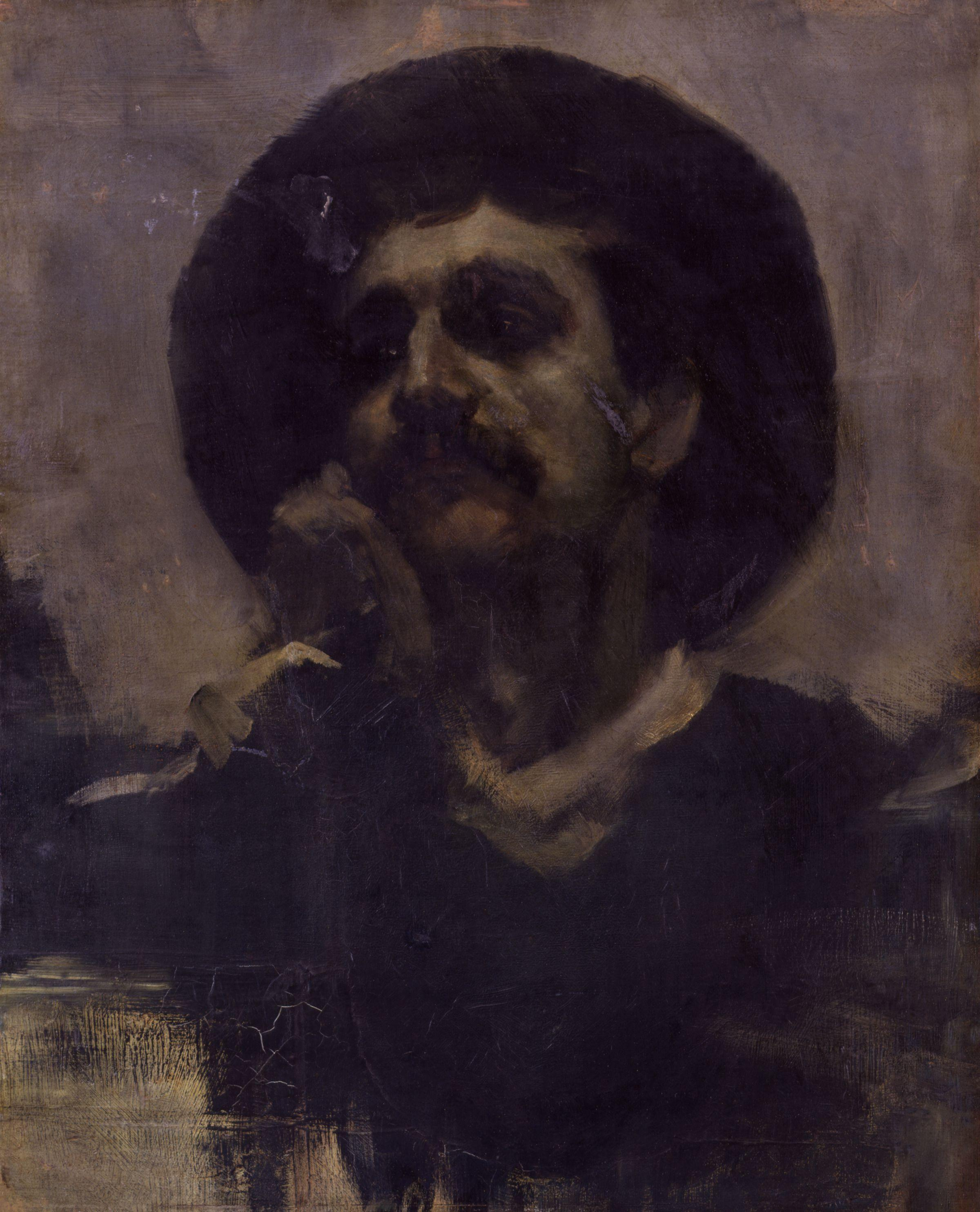
- Self-portrait of Henry Moore
- Born: 7 March 1831
- Died: 22 June 1895 (aged 64)
- Resting place: Highgate Cemetery
- Education: British Academy
- Movement: Marine oils

Henry Moore RA RWS (7 March 1831 in York – 22 June 1895 in Margate) was an English marine and landscape painter.

== Life ==
Moore was born in York, a brother of both Albert Joseph and John Collingham, and the pupil of their father, William Moore.

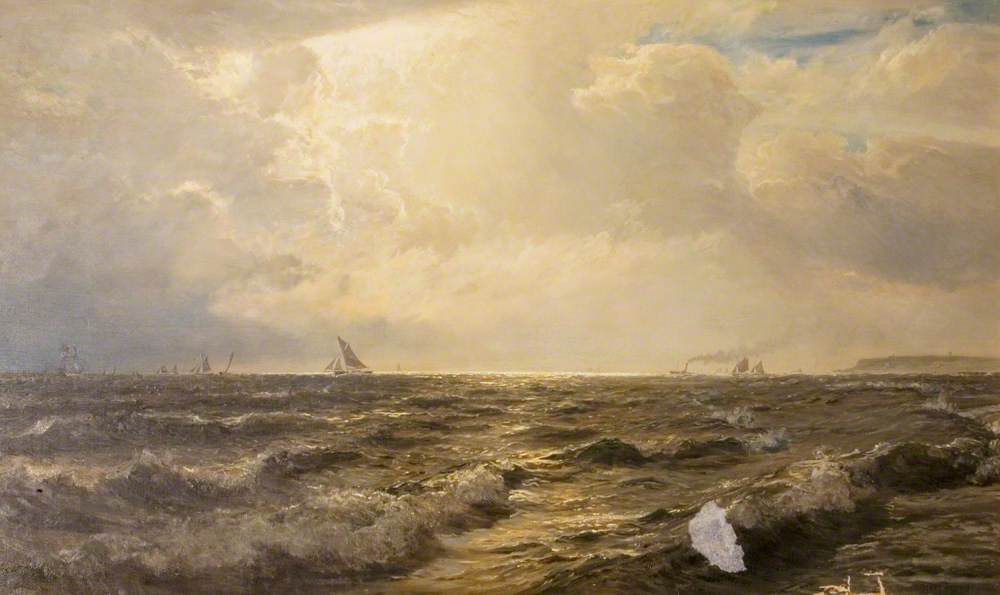
The Silver Streak

Henry was educated at York and was taught painting by his father. He entered the Royal Academy Schools in 1853, and exhibited his first picture, Glen Clunie, Braemar, at the Royal Academy in the same year. He was a constant exhibitor at the Royal Academy from that time onwards. He exhibited at the Portland Gallery from 1855 to 1860, and at the British Institution from 1855 to 1865. It was also in 1855 that he sent the first of many contributions to the gallery of the Society of British Artists in Suffolk Street. He was a member of that society from 1867 to 1875. He was also a constant contributor, both in oils and watercolours, to the Dudley Gallery from 1865 to 1882. He became an associate of the Royal Watercolour Society in 1876, and a full member in 1880. He contributed in later years to the Grosvenor Gallery and the New Gallery. He was elected an Associate of the Royal Academy on 4 June 1885, and a full Royal Academician on 4 May 1893.

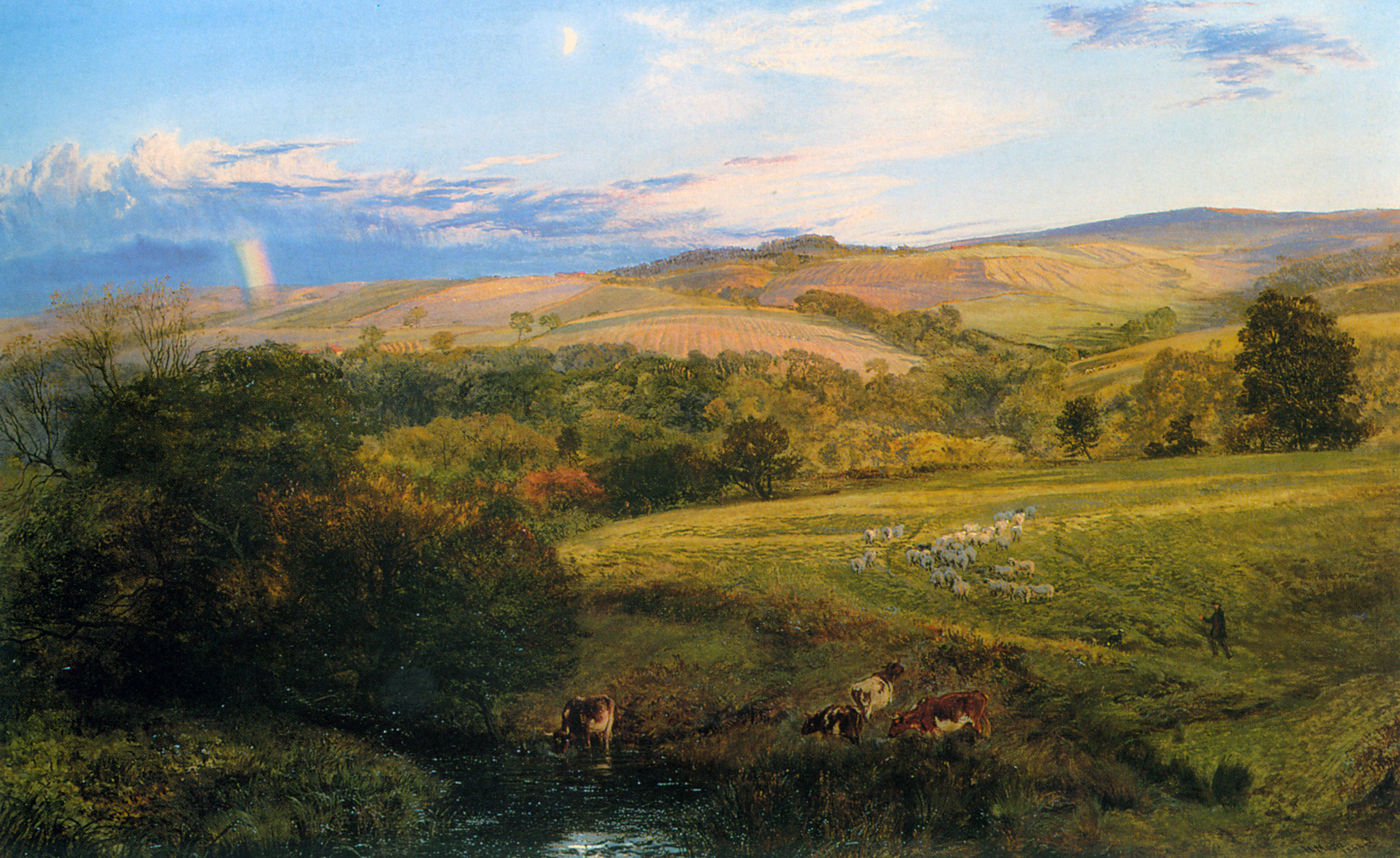
The Rainbow

Almost all his early pictures were landscapes, painted in many parts of England, or, about 1856, in Switzerland. It was towards 1870, that he began to devote himself almost exclusively to the marine subjects in which the best work of his maturity was done. He had a profound and scientific knowledge of wave-form, acquired at the cost of exposure in all weathers, and he was generally content to paint the sea itself without introducing ships or human figures. He made his studies chiefly in the English Channel.

He was a fine colourist, and held the foremost rank among English marine painters of his day. Among the most remarkable of his Academy pictures are A White Calm (1858), The Launch of the Lifeboat (1876), now in the Walker Art Gallery, Liverpool, Cat's-paws off the Land, which was bought out of the funds of the Chautrey Bequest in 1885, and is now at Tate, The Clearness after Rain (1887), which won for the painter the grand prix and legion of honour at the Paris Exhibition of 1889, A Breezy Day in the Channel (1888), Shine and Shower (1889), Summer at Sea (1893), and Britannia's Realm (1880). An exhibition of ninety pictures by Moore, entitled 'Afloat and Ashore,' was held by the Fine Art Society in 1887. The total number of pictures exhibited by Moore was not far short of six hundred. Shortly before his death an exhibition was held at York of the works of the father, William Moore, and his five artist sons, Edwin, William (still living), John Collingham, Henry, and Albert Joseph.

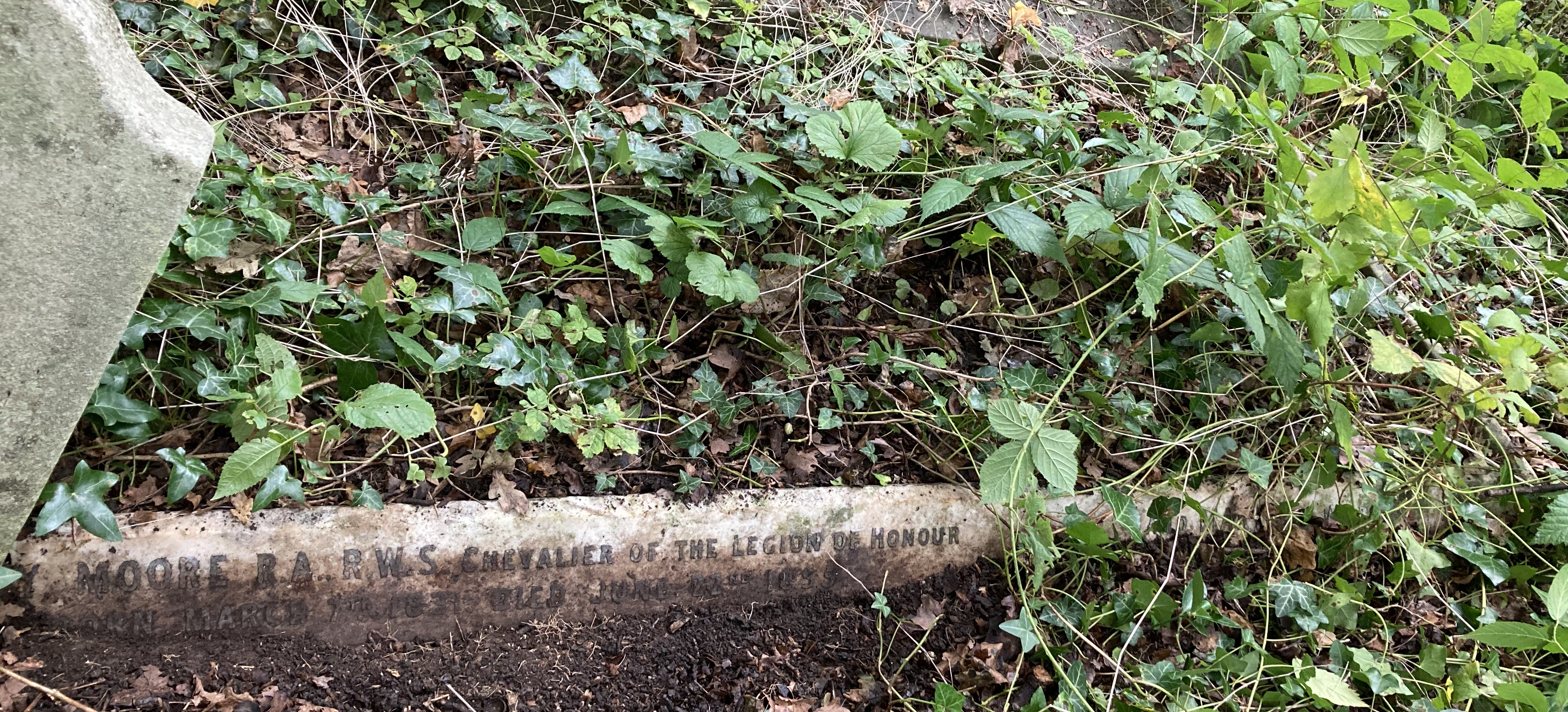
Family grave of Henry Moore in Highgate Cemetery

Moore lived for many years at Hampstead, but died at Margate in East Kent, on 22 June 1895. He is buried in the Moore family grave (plot no.28768) on the eastern side of Highgate Cemetery in London with his brother Albert Joseph and adjoining his brother John Collingham and his family.

== Family ==
Moore was married in 1860 to Mary (died 1890), daughter of Robert Bollans of York. He had two daughters by this marriage.

== Works ==
- The Silver Streak (1881; Herbert Art Gallery and Museum, Coventry)
- The Newhaven Packet (1885; Birmingham Museum and Art Gallery)
- Catspaws off the Land (1885; Tate, London)
- Mount's Bay (1886; Manchester Art Gallery)
- Clearness After Rain (1887; AlbaCore Capital Group collection) exhibited at 1889 Exposition Universelle in Paris. There, Moore was awarded a Médaille d’Honneur
- Clear Shining after Rain won the Gran Prix at Paris in 1889.
