= William Moore (painter) =

English painter

- Born: 30 March 1790; Birmingham
- Died: 9 October 1851 (aged 61)
- Occupation: Painter

William Moore (30 March 1790 – 9 October 1851) was an English portrait painter.

== Biography ==
Moore was born at Birmingham on 30 March 1790, studied under Richard Mills in that city, but after some employment as a designer for commercial purposes, he turned his hand to portrait-painting. In this line he achieved some success and some repute in London. Eventually he settled at York, where he obtained considerable patronage in that city and its neighbourhood. Moore worked in oil, water-colours, and pastel. The deleterious ingredients used in the last method brought on an illness, and hastened his death, which took place at York on 9 October 1851. Moore was twice married: first, on 12 March 1812, to Martha Jackson of Birmingham; secondly, in 1828, at Gainsborough, to Sarah, daughter of Joseph Collingham of Newark. By them he was the father of fourteen children, including thirteen sons; several of the latter, besides Albert Joseph Moore, who is separately noticed, and the well-known painter, Henry Moore, R.A., he brought up to the artist's profession.

Edwin Moore (1813–1893), painter, the eldest son by his first wife, was born on 29 Jan. 1813 at Birmingham. He studied water-colour painting under David Cox the Elder, and also under Samuel Prout. He was employed for many years as a teacher of painting in water-colours at York, especially by the Society of Friends in their schools there, from whom he received a pension after fifty-seven years' work for them. Moore was an occasional exhibitor at the Royal Academy, and died at York on 27 July 1893.

John Collingham Moore (1829–1880), painter, the eldest son of William Moore by his second wife, was born at Gainsborough on 12 March 1829. He practised early as a painter, studying under his father, and later, in 1851, in the schools of the Royal Academy. He was a constant exhibitor at the Royal Academy from 1853 to the year of his death. Moore was best known by his work in watercolour, and especially by his portraits of children and landscape views in or near Rome and Florence. He married in 1865 Emily Simonds, of Reading, and died in London on 12 July 1880.
