= Sisera's mother =

Biblical figure in the Book of Judges

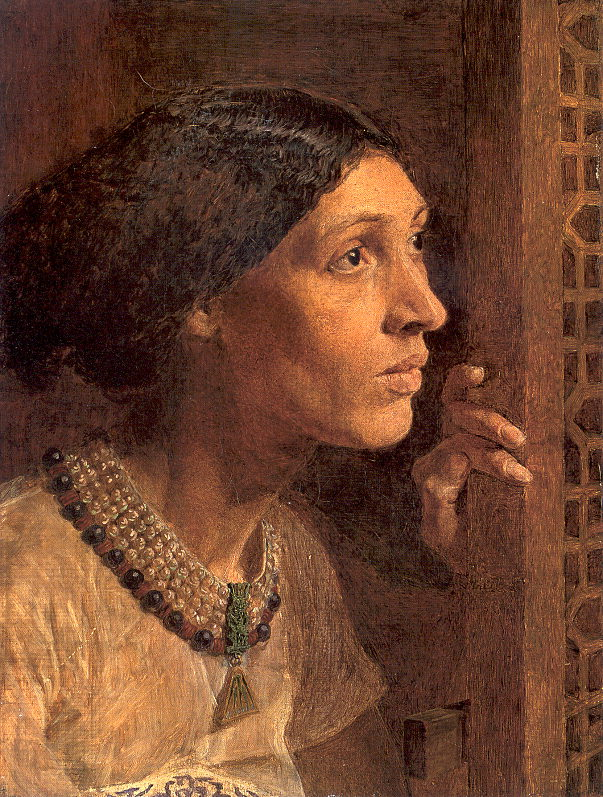
The Mother of Sisera looked out a Window, by Albert Joseph Moore

Sisera's mother is an unnamed biblical figure mentioned in the Book of Judges. Her son, Sisera, was defeated in battle by Deborah and Barak, and then killed by Yael, who drove a tent peg through his skull.

== Description ==
Sisera's mother is mentioned only in Judges 5:28–30, in the Song of Deborah. Thus, all that is said about her is possibly from Deborah's imagination. Deborah pictures Sisera's mother looking out of a window, waiting for her son, and wondering why he has not yet returned. Her attendants suggest, and she agrees, that Sisera is dividing and enjoying the plunder, including "a womb or two for every man" (Judges 5:30, ESV). Arthur Waskow notes that "the tone of contempt she uses might lead to a much rougher translation in colloquial English", while Nehama Aschkenasy says that it is "blatantly graphic and sexual". Judy Sterman suggests that Sisera's mother "allows herself to be mollified by untrue and crass words".

James B. Jordan notes the crude and vicious nature of the words of Sisera's mother, and suggests that "the reason why Sisera was such a vicious enemy of God's people, and such a cruel man, was that he had such a mother". Jordan goes on to say that Deborah "delights in the misery of the enemy mother, whose savage expectations will not be realised".

Sisera's mother has been described as "foolish [and] ineffectual", as well as "evil and sexually depraved". Aschkenasy notes, however, that "we have no way of knowing whether the historical woman, Sisera's mother, was really that cruel. Deborah may have based her portrait on rumors, or on her general knowledge of Canaanite women".

Sisera's mother has been depicted in art and in poetry. Most of these portrayals concentrate on her anxiety while awaiting Sisera's return.

== Connection to the shofar ==
According to Jewish tradition, because Sisera's mother cried 100 cries when her son did not return home, Jews blow 100 blasts on the shofar on Rosh Hashanah, the Jewish New Year. Further in this vein, the Talmud defines the teruah sound of the shofar as being like the yevava (sobbing) of Sisera's mother.

Eliyahu Kitov notes that there are 101 letters in the account of Sisera's mother in the Book of Judges. By blowing only 100 times, Ashkenazi Jews counteract all but one cry, leaving that to the natural emotion of a mother weeping over her son. However, the Sephardic tradition is to blow an additional blast before the end of the Rosh Hashana morning service.

One rabbinic tradition suggests that, in looking out of the window, Sisera's mother gets a glimpse of the future and sees that her offspring, one of whom is Rabbi Akiva, will change their ways and become teachers of Torah.

== See also ==
- Harosheth Haggoyim
- List of names for the biblical nameless
