= Midsummer (painting) =

Painting by Albert Joseph Moore

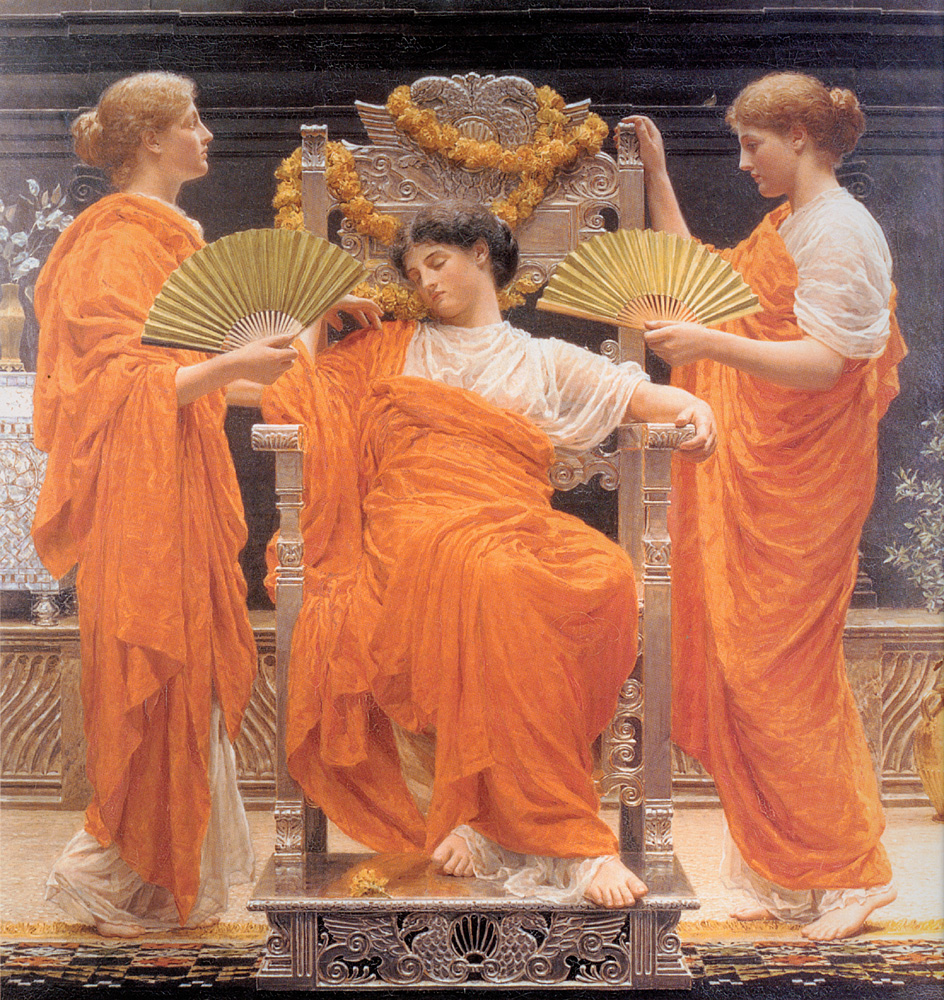
- Artist: Albert Joseph Moore
- Year: 1887
- Type: Oil on canvas, genre painting
- Dimensions: 155 cm × 148.5 cm (61 in × 58.5 in)
- Location: Russell-Cotes Art Gallery, Bournemouth

'Midsummer is an 1887 oil painting by the British artist Albert Joseph Moore. It depicts three nearly life-sized woman in classical Greek dress in the intense heat of midsummer. Moore was a key member of the Aesthetic movement of the later Victorian era, and this is one of the best-known images of Aestheticism which championed "art for art's sake" over more traditional narrative arts. It has been described as "a signature example of Aestheticism".

The painting was displayed at the Royal Academy Exhibition of 1887 at Burlington House in London. The picture is today in the collection of the Russell-Cotes Art Gallery in Bournemouth, having been acquired in 1936.

== Bibliography ==
- Bills, Mark. Art in the Age of Queen Victoria: A Wealth of Depictions. Russell-Cotes Art Gallery and Museum, 2001.
- Kresser, Katie. Church Beautiful: Sacred Art and Spiritual Healing. Wipf & Stock Publishers, 2026.
