= John Collingham Moore =

British artist during the Victorian era

John Collingham Moore (1829 – 12 July 1880) was a British artist during the Victorian era. He painted landscapes in Italy before becoming known as a portrait painter upon his return to England.

== Early life and family ==
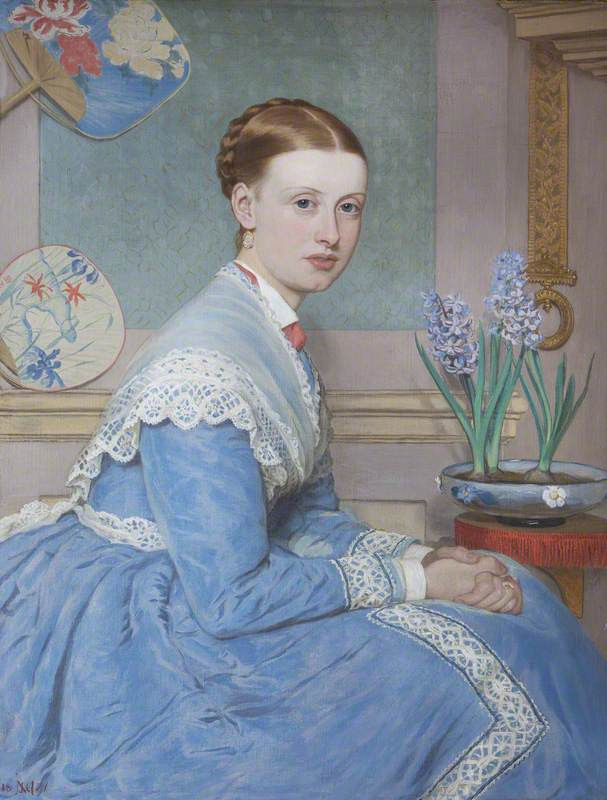
Emily Langton Langton (1871) by John Collingham Moore

John Collingham Moore was born in Gainsborough in Lincolnshire. He was one of the 14 children of the artist William Moore of York, who in the first half of the 19th century enjoyed a considerable reputation in the north of England as a painter of portraits and landscape. Amongst his brothers were the artists, Albert Joseph Moore and Henry Moore.

== Career ==
Moore trained at the Royal Academy Schools from 1850. He first worked in London, lodging with his two brothers.

In 1858, the three brothers moved to Italy in order to paint the landscape so popular with the British public, in both oils and watercolour. He sent paintings of Rome and the Roman Campagna back to England, where they were exhibited in the Dudley Gallery's summer exhibitions in London.

Upon his return to England, however, he became best known as a portrait painter.

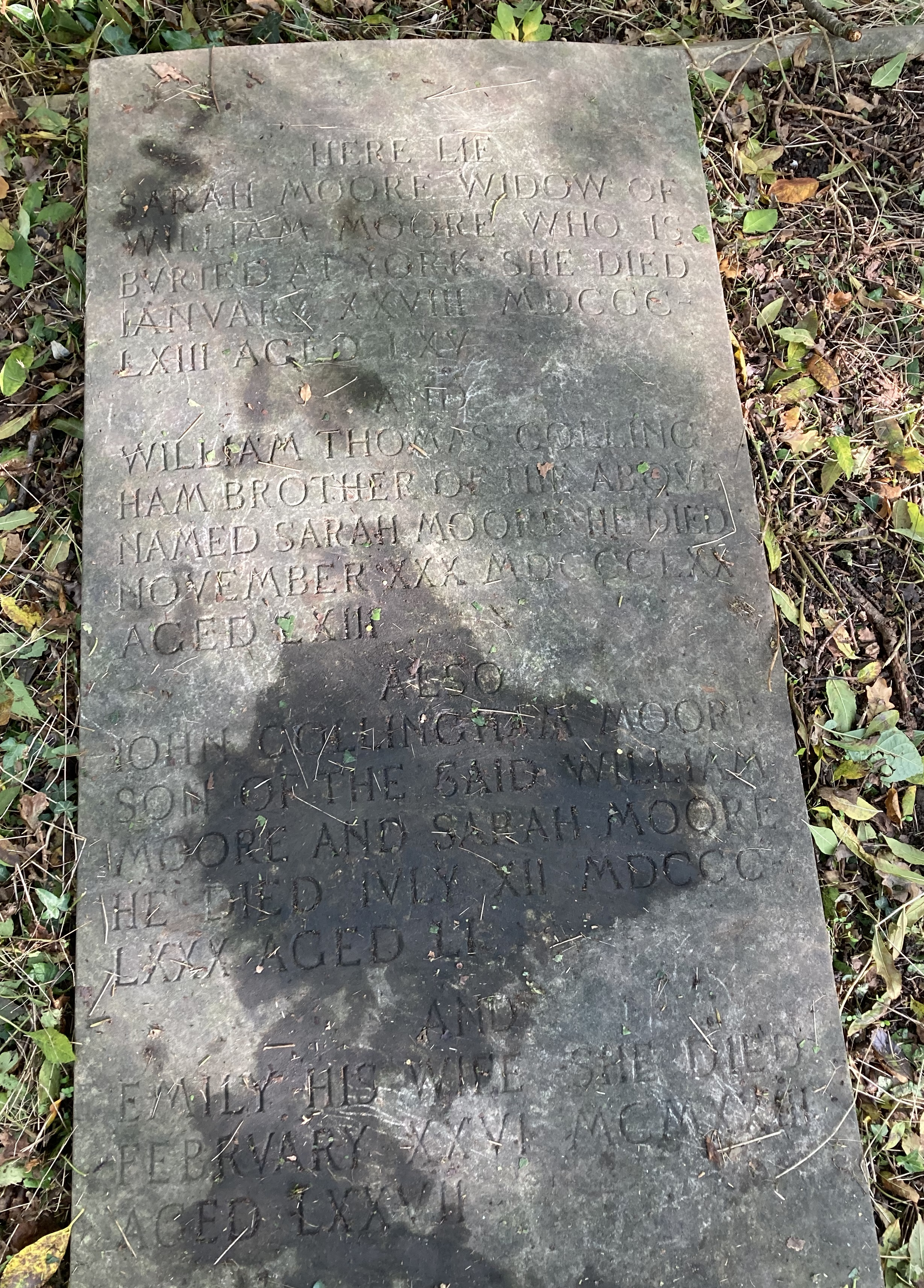
Family grave of John Collingham Moore in Highgate Cemetery

== Personal life ==
Moore married Emily Simonds, the youngest sister of the sculptor and businessman George Blackall Simonds of Reading in Berkshire. The couple had three sons and a daughter. They lived together at Kensington in Middlesex (now Greater London).

In later life, Moore lived at Northbrook House in Grove Road, St John's Wood in Middlesex (now Greater London), where he died on 12 July 1880. He was buried in the Moore family grave on the eastern side of Highgate Cemetery in the adjoining plot to his two brothers.
