= Harosheth Haggoyim =

Fortress described in the Book of Judges

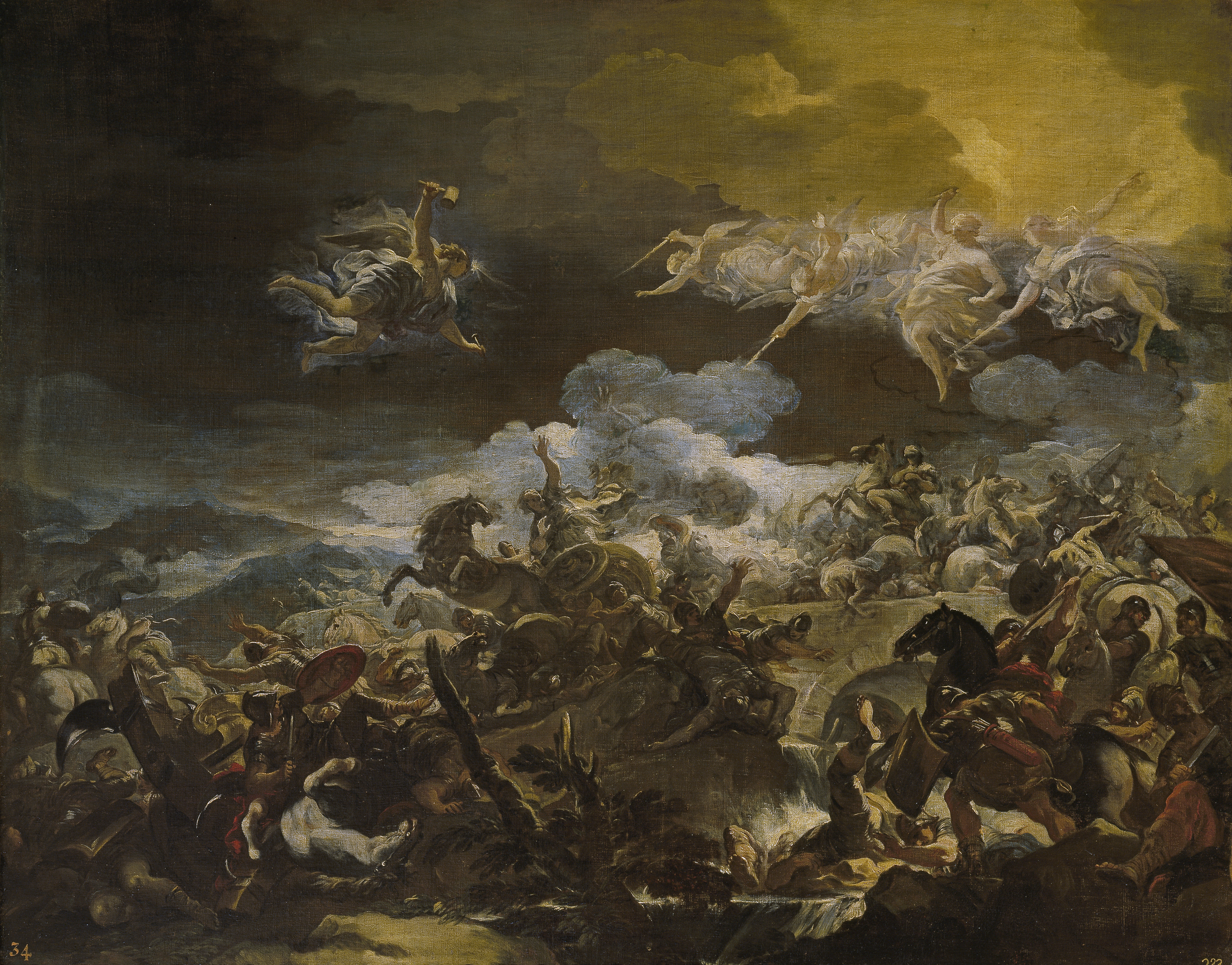
The Defeat of Sisera by Luca Giordano shows Sisera in battle.

Harosheth Haggoyim (Hebrew: חרושת הגויים, lit. Smithy of the Nations) is a fortress described in the Book of Judges as the fortress or cavalry base of Sisera, commander of the army of "Jabin, King of Canaan".

Sisera is described as having had nine hundred iron chariots with which he fought the Israelites. In Judges 5, the mother of Sisera is poignantly described looking from a window, presumably in Harosheth Haggoyim, and asking "Why is his chariot so long in coming? Why is the clatter of his chariots delayed?" when he does not return from the battle where his army was defeated by the Israelites, and he was killed by the Biblical heroine Yael.

== Modern identifications ==
=== Hariss in Lebanon ===
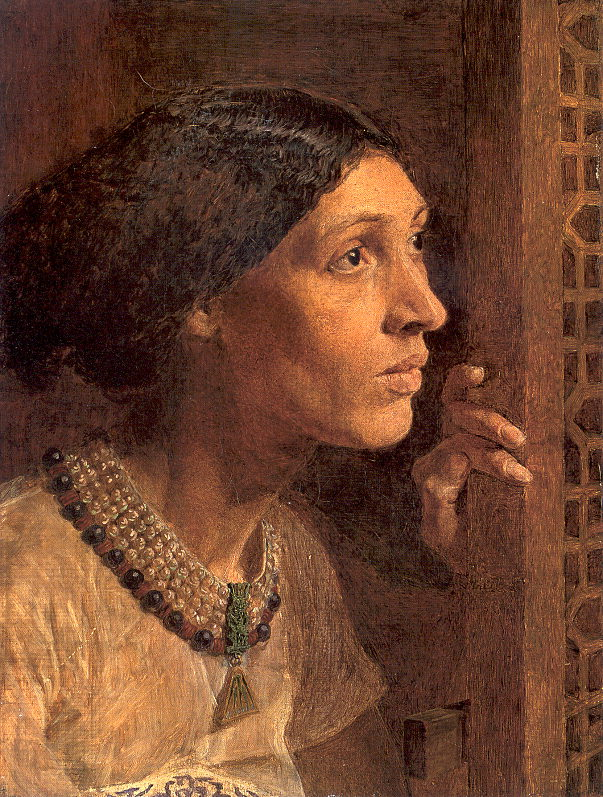
The Mother of Sisera looked out a Window by Albert Joseph Moore.

In the late 19th century, Victor Guérin identified the southern Lebanese village of Hariss with Harosheth, a location with which the PEF's Survey of Western Palestine seems to agree.

=== El-Ahwat in Israel ===
Archaeologist Adam Zertal of the University of Haifa proposed that the site of El-Ahwat, between Katzir-Harish and Nahal Iron, is the site of Harosheth Haggoyim, and the more recent find of a fancy chariot linchpin by archaeologist Oren Cohen seems to corroborate this hypothesis.

The site was excavated from 1993-2000 by teams from the University of Haifa and the University of Cagliari in Sardinia. The dig was headed by Professor Zertal. The dig revealed a fortified place dating to the Late Bronze Age and early Iron Age (13th-12th centuries BCE). The style of the fortifications, walls, passageways in the walls and rounded huts is very different from Canaanite cities of the era, leading Zertal to propose that the site may have been occupied by the Shardana, one of the Sea Peoples who invaded the Levant in the Late Bronze Age. Zertal based his 2010 Hebrew language Sisera’s Secret, A Journey following the Sea-Peoples and the Song of Deborah, (Dvir, Tel Aviv) on this theory.

==== Chariot linchpin ====
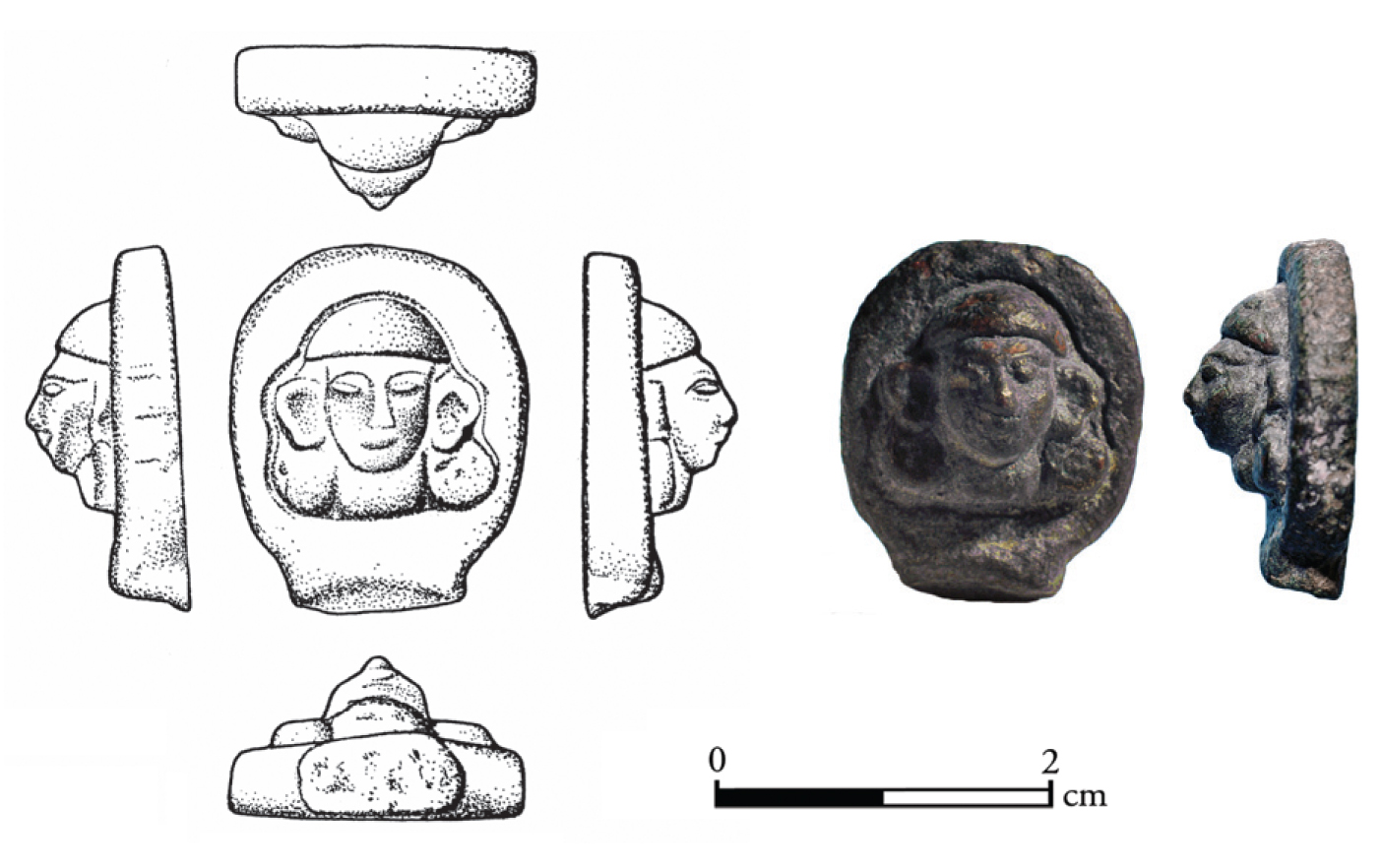
The linchpin

Among the more intriguing objects uncovered by the El-Ahwat dig is a small, round, bronze relief measuring about 2 cm. in diameter and 5 mm. thick. The bronze shows the "face of a woman wearing a cap and earrings shaped as chariot wheels." It was found inside a structure identified by the archaeological team as the “Governor’s House”. It is clear that the bronze was once the finial or end of an "elongated object" from which it had been broken off in antiquity.

It has now been identified as a linchpin from the wheel of a war chariot belonging to a high-ranking person. It would have appeared on the side of a chariot in much the position as a modern hubcap.

Zertal explained the significance of the discovery, “This identification enhances the historical and archaeological value of the site and proves that chariots belonging to high-ranking individuals were found there. It provides support for the possibility, which has not yet been definitively established, that this was Sisera’s city of residence and that it was from there that the chariots set out on their way to the battle against the Israelite tribes, located between the ancient sites of Taanach and Megiddo.”

=== Valley of Jezreel ===
Anson Rainey, offers an alternative etymology of the place name Harosheth Haggoyim. Specifically he proposes to translate "Harosheth" (the Hebrew root ḥ-r-sh) as 'farmland', or 'ploughed land'. Rainey argues that this 'farmland' is the broad, flat agricultural plain of the Jezreel Valley, situated directly between Taanach and Megiddo.

Also he points out the need for lowland (rather than wooded hilly terrain) for chariots to manoeuvre and get ready for battle. In addition, some other records of military encampments in the area would indicate the chariot base location in the Valley of Jezreel, between Taanach and Megiddo.

== Bibliography ==
- Conder, C.R.; Kitchener, H.H. (1881). The Survey of Western Palestine: Memoirs of the Topography, Orography, Hydrography, and Archaeology. Vol. 1. London: Committee of the Palestine Exploration Fund.
- Guérin, V. (1880). Description Géographique Historique et Archéologique de la Palestine (in French). Vol. 3: Galilee, pt. 2. Paris: L'Imprimerie Nationale.
