= Albert Joseph Moore =

English artist (1841–1893)

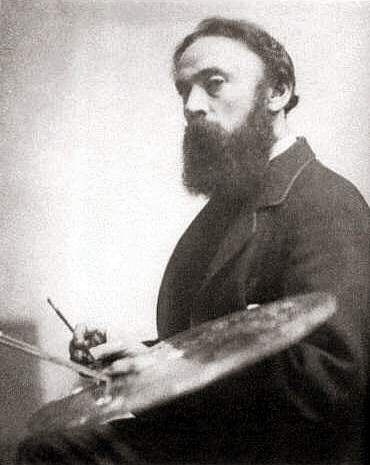
- Photo c. 1870
- Born: 4 September 1841; York, England
- Died: 25 September 1893 (aged 52); London, England

Albert Joseph Moore (4 September 1841 – 25 September 1893) was an English painter, known for his depictions of languorous female figures set against the luxury and decadence of the classical world.

== Life ==
Moore was born at York on 4 September 1841, the thirteenth son and fourteenth child of well known portrait-painter William Moore and his second wife, Sarah Collingham. Several of his numerous brothers were educated as artists, including John Collingham Moore and Henry Moore, R.A., the well-known sea painter. Albert Moore was educated at Archbishop Holgate's School, and also at St. Peter's School at York, receiving at the same time instruction in drawing and painting from his father. He made such progress that he gained a medal from the Department of Science and Art at Kensington in May 1853, before completing his twelfth year.

After his father's death in 1851, Moore owed much to the care and tuition of his brother, John Collingham. In 1855, he came to London and attended the Kensington grammar school till 1858, when he became a student at the Royal Academy Schools. He had already exhibited there in 1857, when he sent A Goldfinch and A Woodcock.

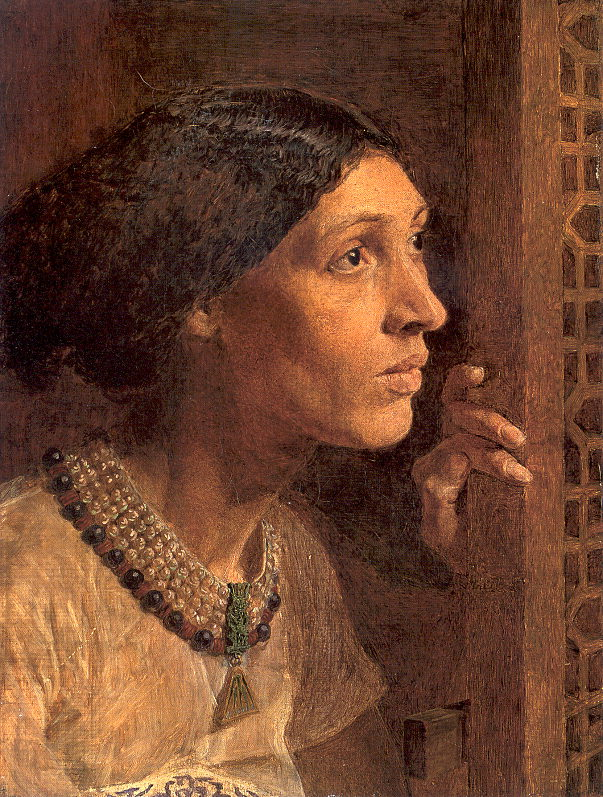
The Mother of Sisera looked out a Window, 1861

His early works shows the influence of Ruskin. In 1859 he was in France with the architect William Eden Nesfield. In 1861, he made a new venture with two sacred subjects, The Mother of Sisera looked out of a Window (Tullie House Museum and Art Gallery, Carlisle) and Elijah running to Jezreel before Ahab's Chariot (National Gallery of Canada, Ottawa). Meanwhile, Moore had given signs of the remarkable skill which he afterwards displayed as a decorative artist. The 1860s saw Moore designing tiles, wallpaper and stained glass for Morris, Marshall, Faulkner and Co., and working as an ecclesiastic and domestic mural painter. During this period his works began to take on a markedly neo-classical character, Moore making an extensive study of antique sculpture, particularly the Elgin marbles in the British Museum. His concern for decorative, colour harmonies became apparent in his paintings of the mid-1860s onwards. His works, typically single female figures with formalized proportions, neo-classical drapery and floral accessories, established a major strand of the Aesthetic Movement.

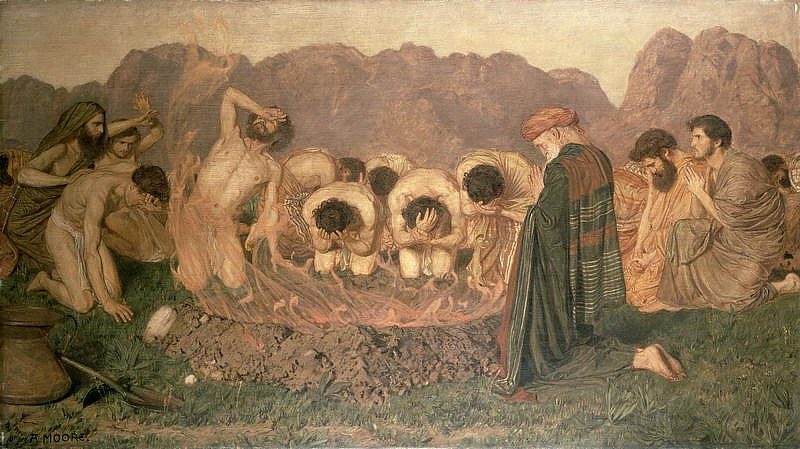
Elijah's Sacrifice, 1863

About 1860 he painted a ceiling at Shipley, followed by another at Croxteth Park, Lancashire. He spent the winter of 1862–3 in Rome with his brother John Collingham Moore. It was here that he painted Elijah's Sacrifice (1863), which shows the influence of Ford Madox Brown and Edward Armitage. In 1863 he executed a wall painting for the kitchen of Combe Abbey for the Earl of Craven. Moore was a regular exhibitor at the Grosvenor Gallery from 1877 onwards.

In 1864, he exhibited at the Royal Academy a group in fresco, entitled The Seasons, which attracted notice from the graceful pose of the limbs in the figures, and the delicate folds of the draperies. In 1865, Moore exhibited at the Royal Academy The Marble Seat, the first of a long series of purely decorative pictures, with which his name will always be associated. Henceforth he devoted himself entirely to this class of painting, and every picture was the result of a carefully thought out and elaborated harmony in pose and colour, having as its basis the human form, studied in the true Hellenic spirit.

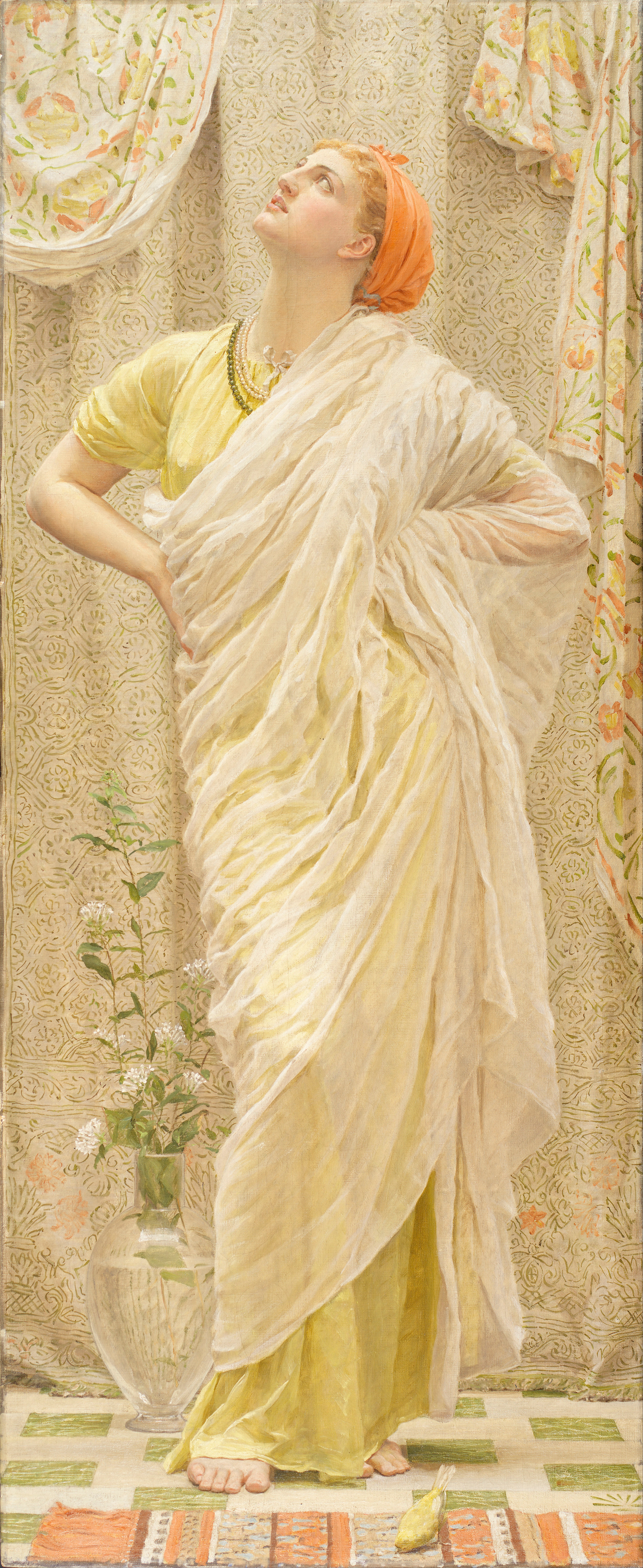
Canaries, c. 1875 – 1880

From the mid-1860s onwards, Moore increasingly began to paint works of female figures in differing states of consciousness, often sleep. This can be seen in works ranging from Lilies (1866) to Dreamers (1879–82) to Midsummer (1887). These paintings relate sensory, bodily experience with consciousness itself, in ways aligned with the ideas of contemporary physiological psychologists like George Henry Lewes. Such depictions suggest Moore's interest in the contemporary science of mind and experience, and he pursued related themes until his death.

The chief charm of Moore's pictures lay in the delicate low tones of the diaphanous, tissue-like garments in which the figures were draped. The names attached to the pictures were generally suggested by the completed work, and rarely represented any preconceived idea in the artist's mind. Among them were such titles as A Painter's Tribute to Music, Shells, The Reader, Dreamers, Battledore, Shuttlecock, Azaleas. In so limited a sphere of art, Moore found his admirers among the few true connoisseurs of art rather than among the general public. His pictures were frequently sold off the easel before completion, but it was not till late in his life that he obtained what may be called direct patronage. He executed other important decorative works, like The Last Supper and some paintings for a church at Rochdale, the hall at Claremont, the proscenium of the Queen's Theatre, Long Acre, and a frieze of peacocks for Mr. Lehmann.

Moore was of an independent disposition, and relied solely on his own judgment in matters both social and artistic. His somewhat outspoken views proved a bar to his admission into the ranks of the Royal Academy, for which he was many years a candidate, and where his works were long a chief source of attraction.

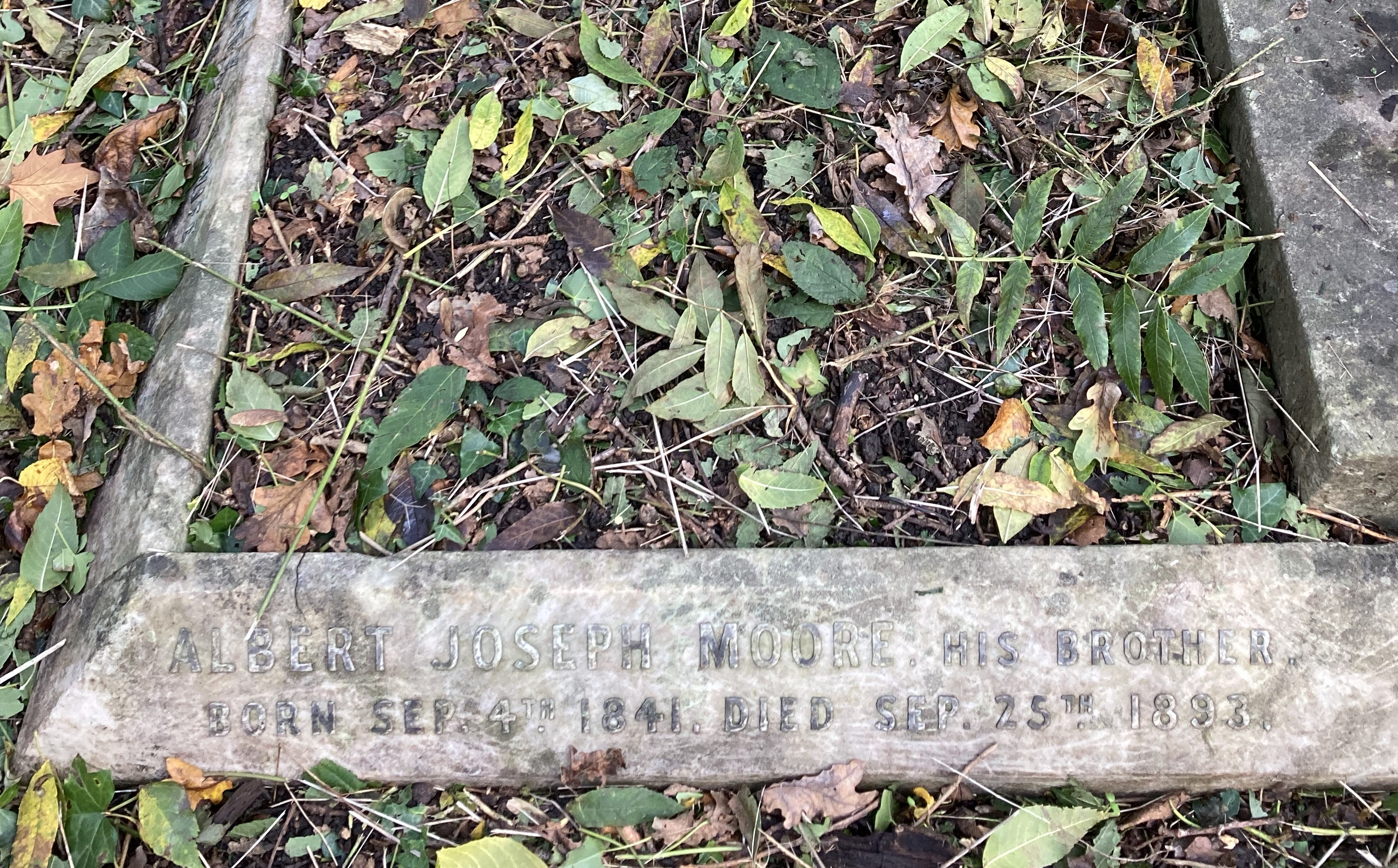
Grave of Albert Joseph Moore in Highgate Cemetery

Though suffering from a painful and incurable illness, Moore worked up to the last, completing by sheer courage and determination an important picture just before his death, which occurred on 25 September 1893, at 2 Spenser Street, Victoria Street, Westminster.

He was buried on the eastern side of Highgate Cemetery with his brother Henry Moore. The adjacent plot contains John Collingham Moore and his family.

His last picture, The Loves of the Seasons and the Winds, is one of his most elaborate and painstaking works; it was painted for Mr. McCulloch, and Moore wrote three stanzas of verse to explain the title.

Moore's work is now represented in many important public collections, such as those of Birmingham, Liverpool, Manchester, and elsewhere. An exhibition of his works was held at the Grafton Galleries, London, in 1894.

Several of his pictures are now in public collections throughout the United Kingdom and, in addition to those above, include Blossoms in the Tate, and a watercolour, The Open Book, in the Victoria and Albert Museum, London. The British Museum in London has a group of his early drawings.

== Works ==
- The Quartette (1869)
- Seagulls (1871; Williamson Art Gallery and Museum, Birkenhead)
- Follow-my-Leader (1873)
- Shells (1874)
- Topaz (1879)
- Rose Leaves (1880)
- Yellow Marguerites (1881)
- Blossoms (1881)
- Dreamers (1882; Birmingham Museum and Art Gallery)
- Reading Aloud (1884; Kelvingrove Art Gallery and Museum, Glasgow)
- Silver (1886)
- Midsummer (1887; Russell-Cotes Art Gallery & Museum, Bournemouth)
- A River Side (1888),
- A Summer Night (1890; Walker Art Gallery, Liverpool)
- Lightning and Light (1892; Private collection)
- An Idyll (1893)
- The Loves of the Winds and the Seasons (1893; Blackburn Museum and Art Gallery, large picture finished only a few days before his death)

== Gallery ==
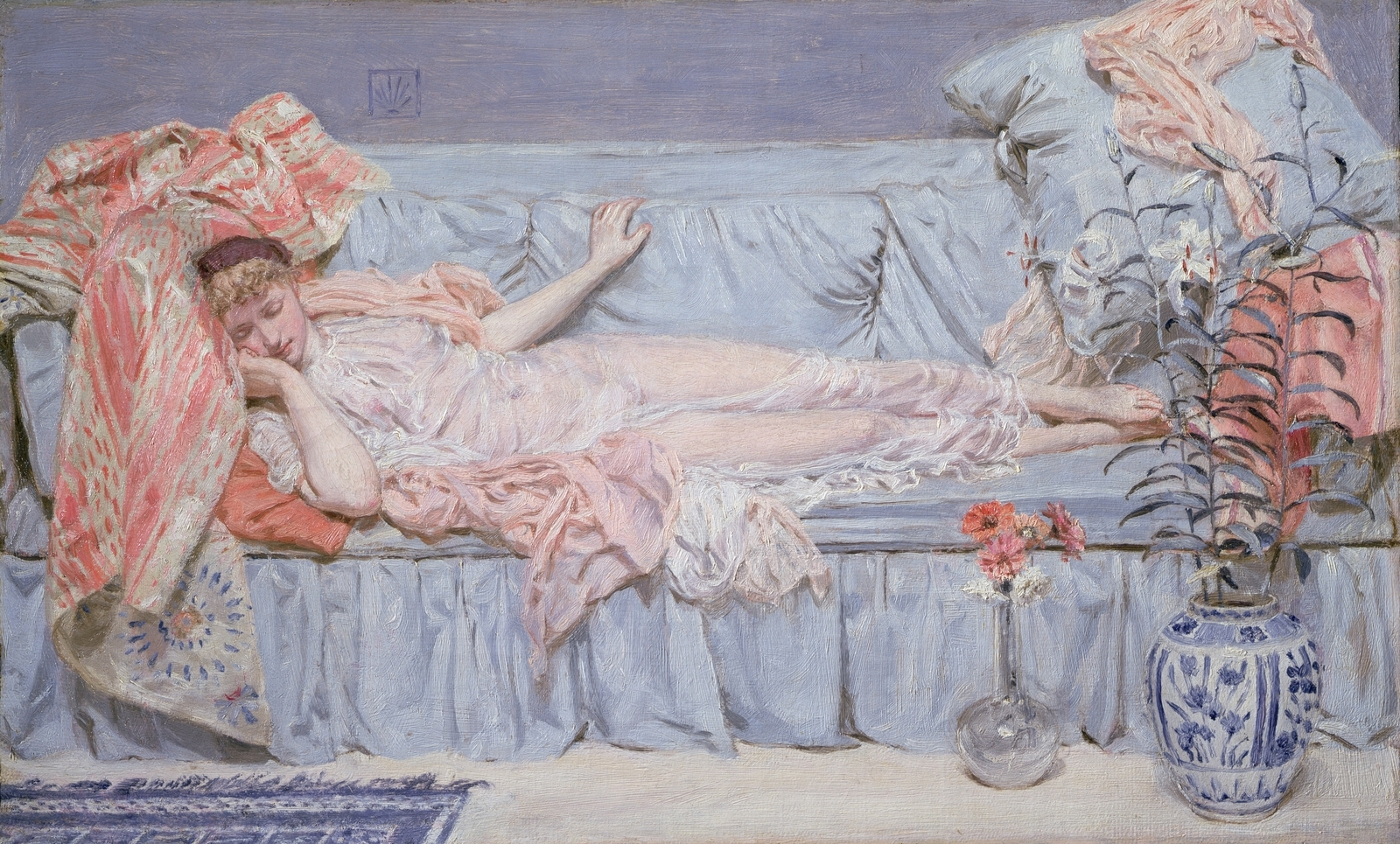
Lilies, 1866

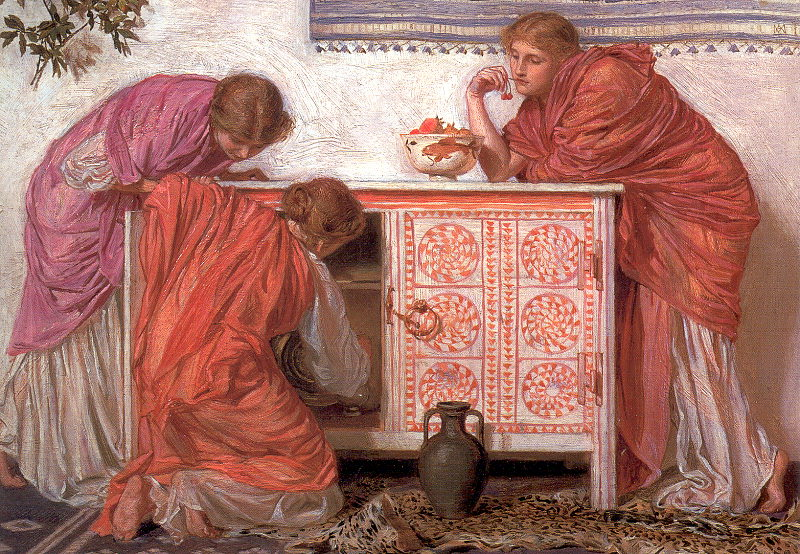
Pomegranates, 1866

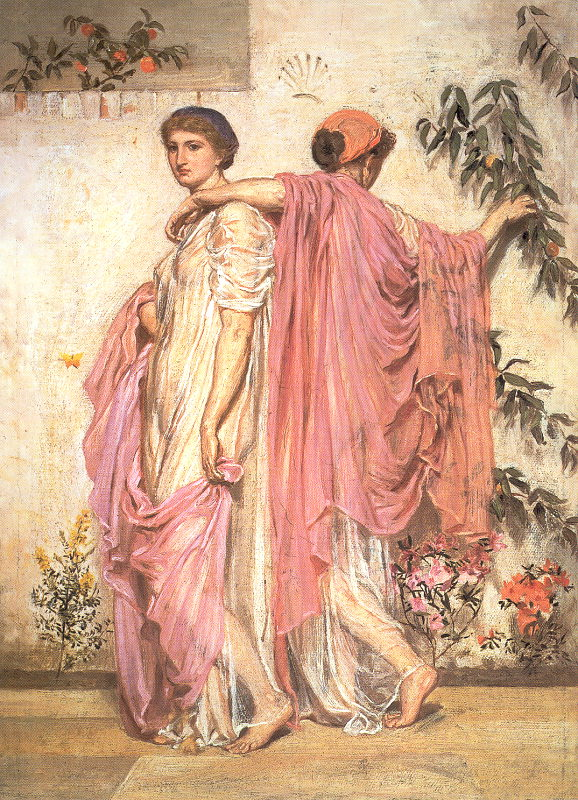
Apricots, 1866

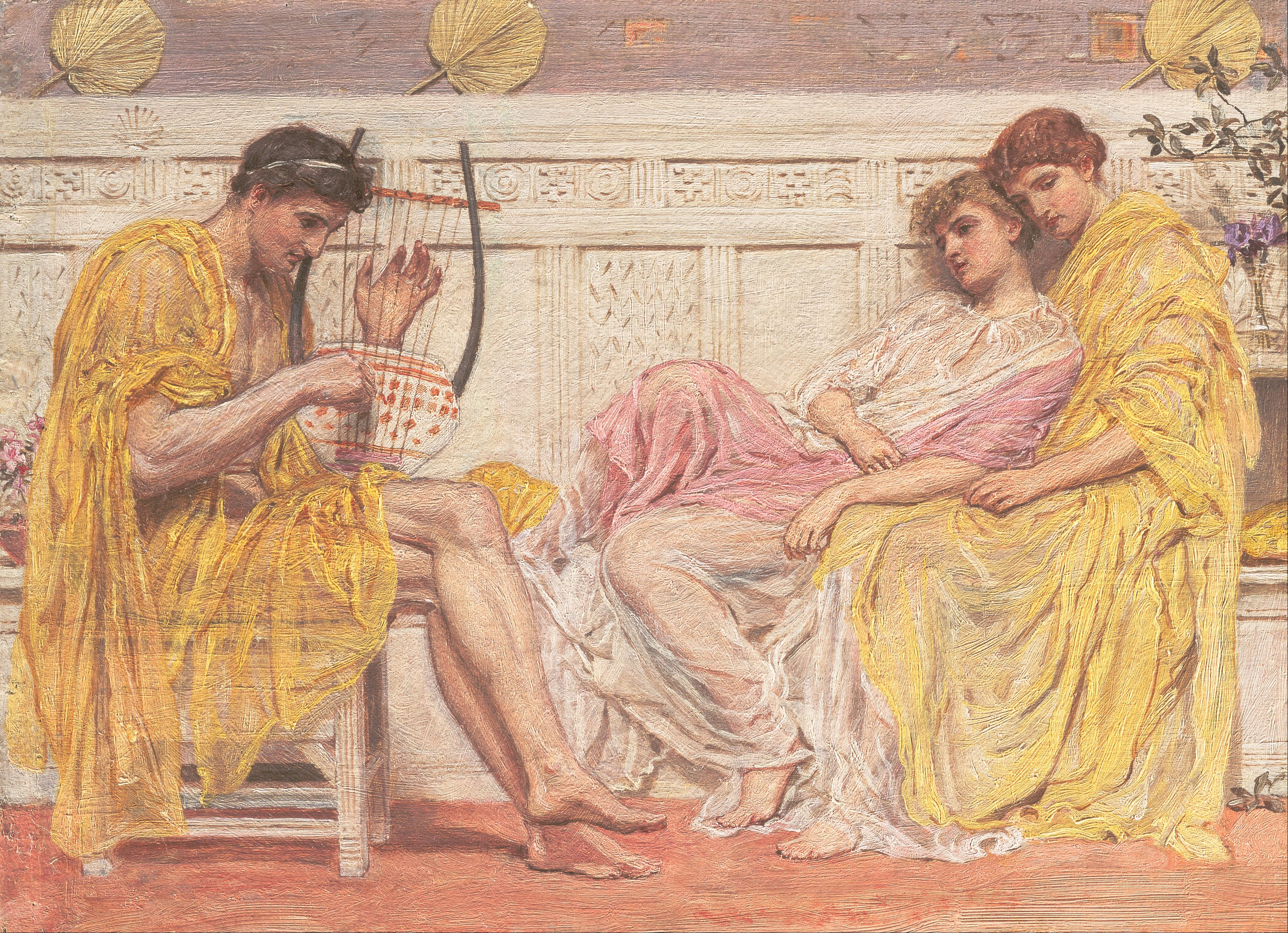
A Musician, c. 1867

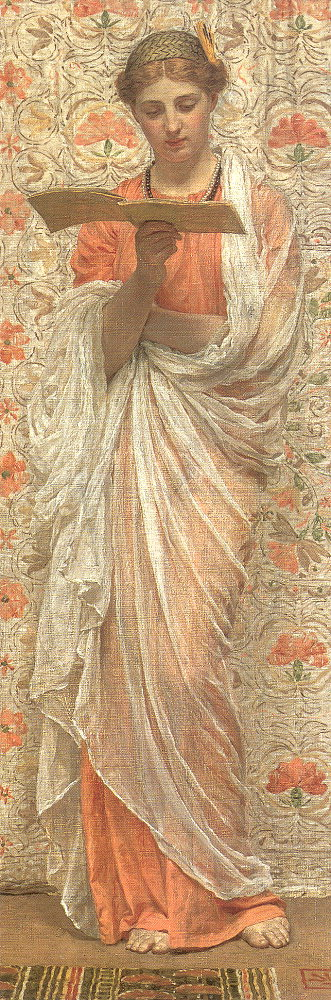
A Reader

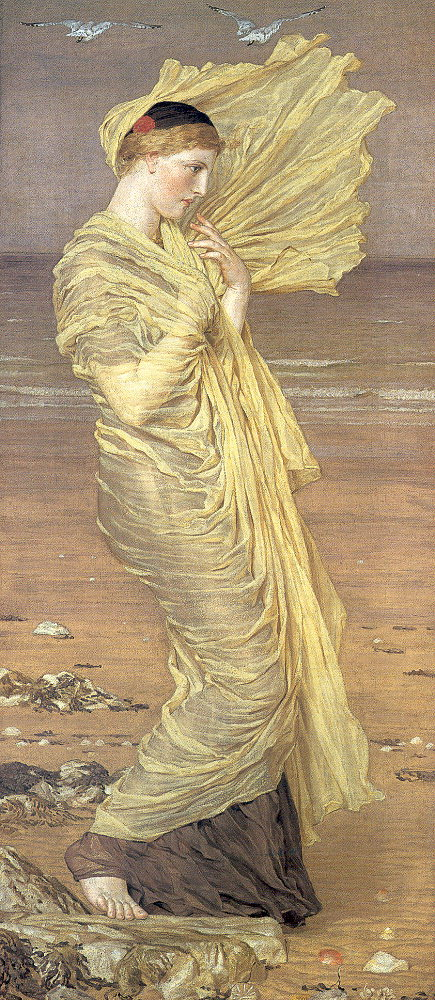
Seagulls

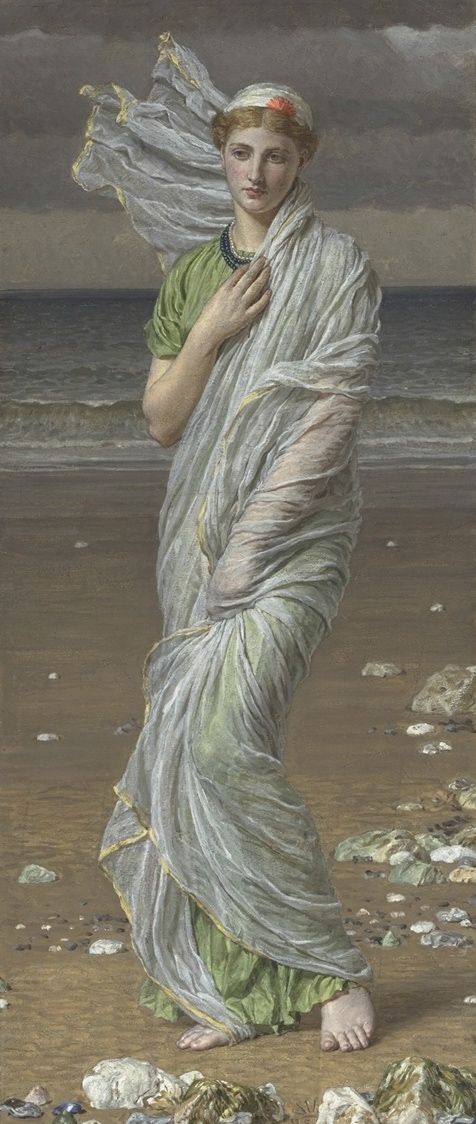
Seashells

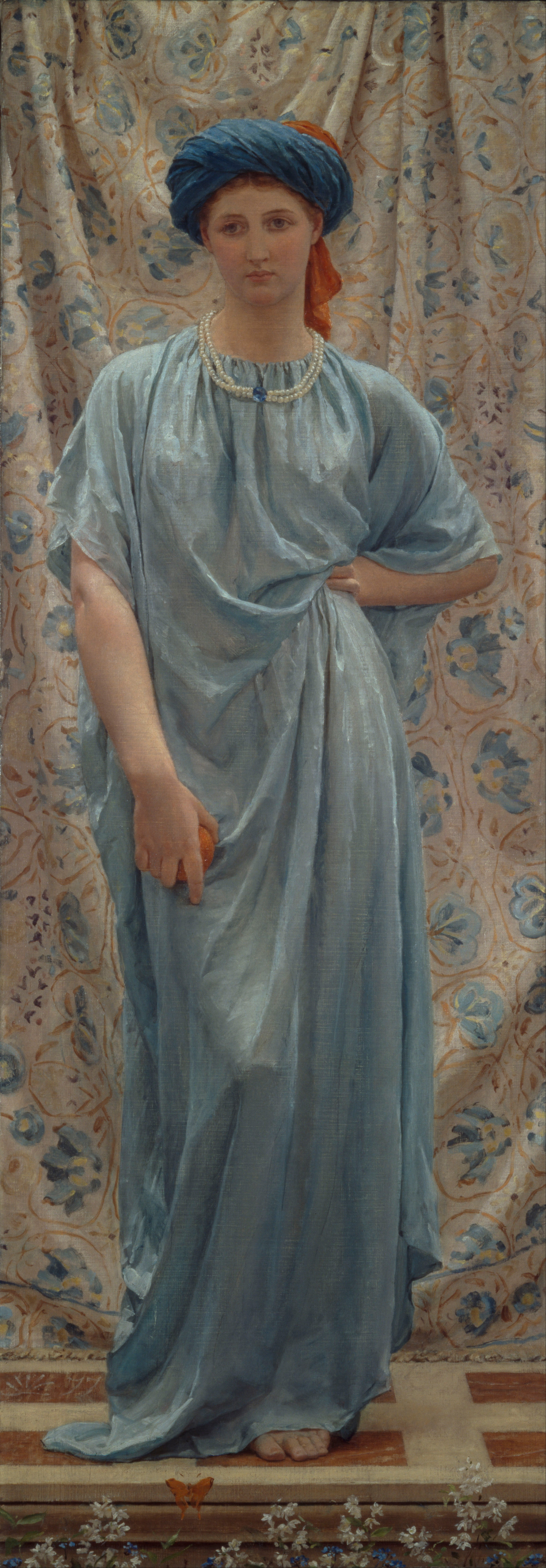
Sapphires, 1877

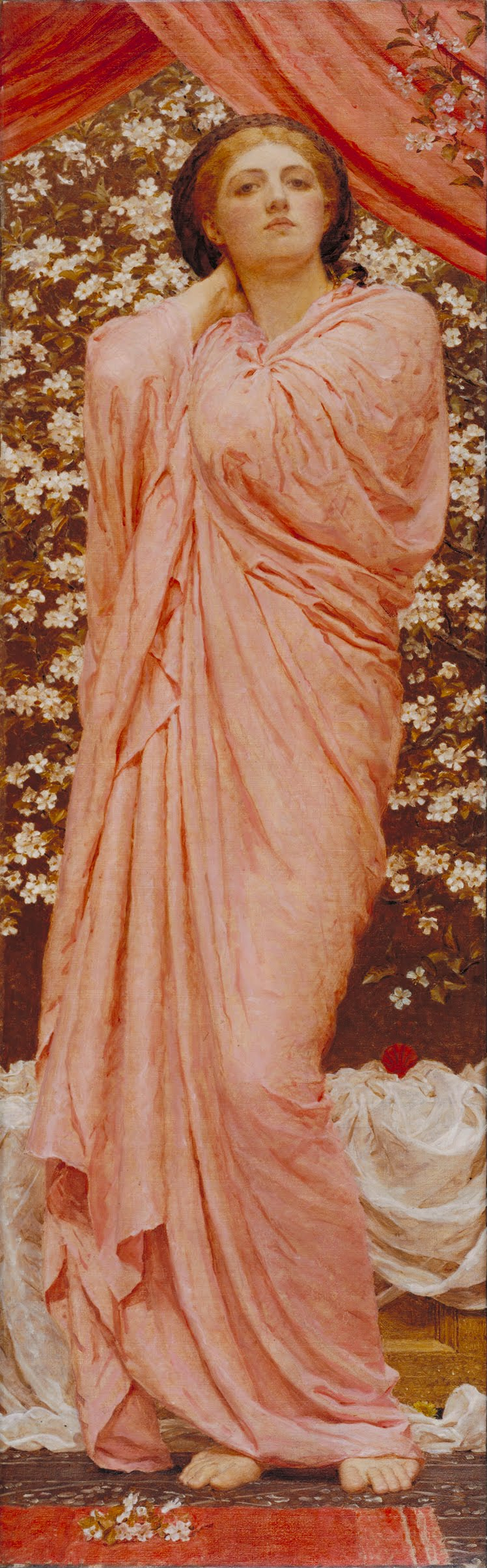
Blossoms, 1881

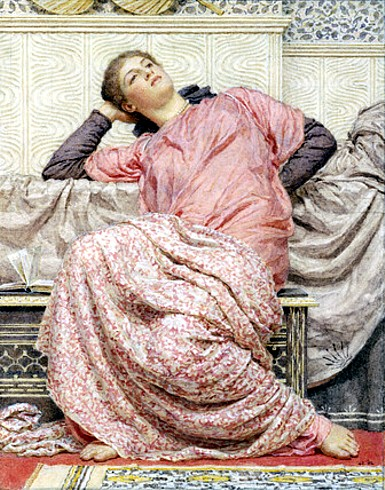
An Open Book, c. 1884

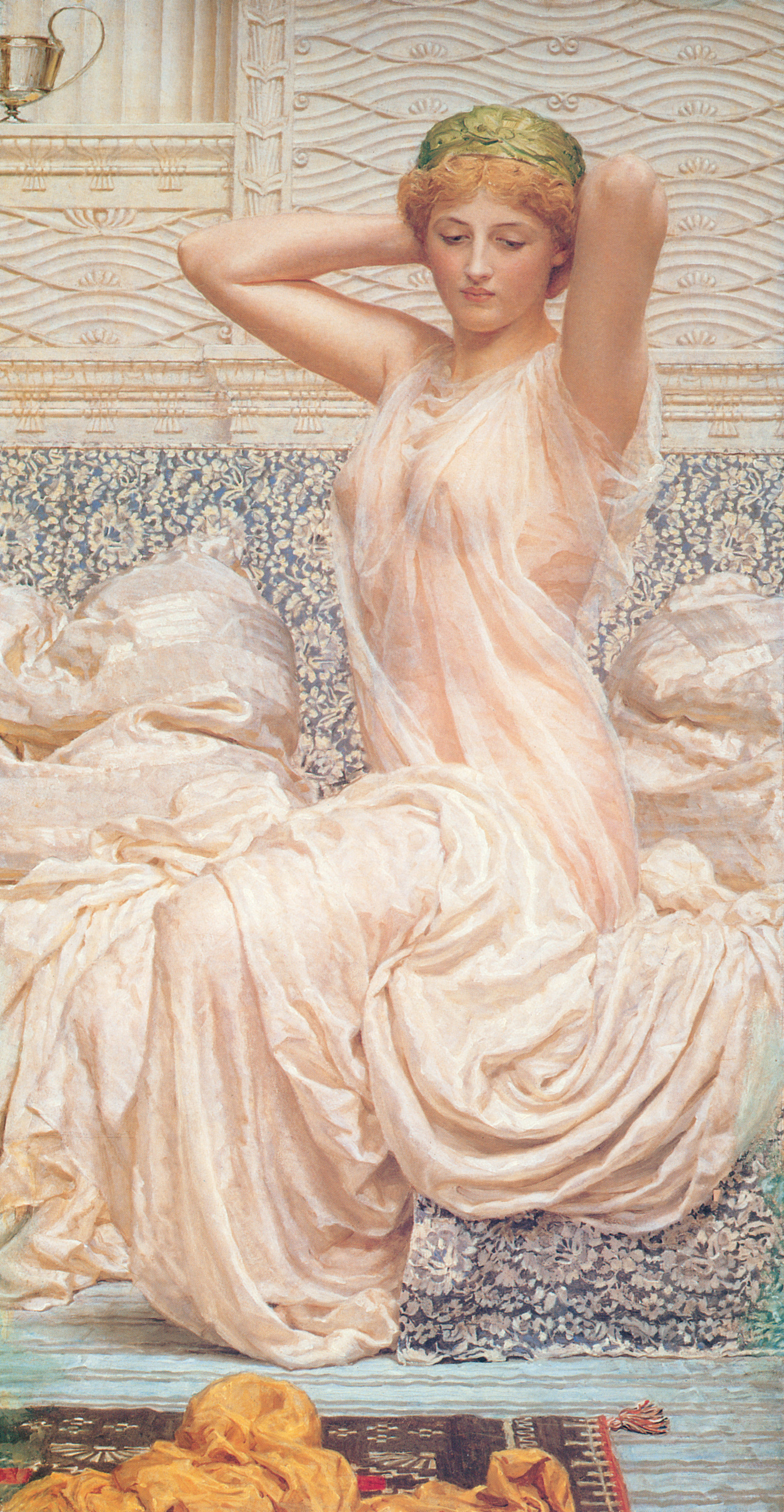
Silver, 1886

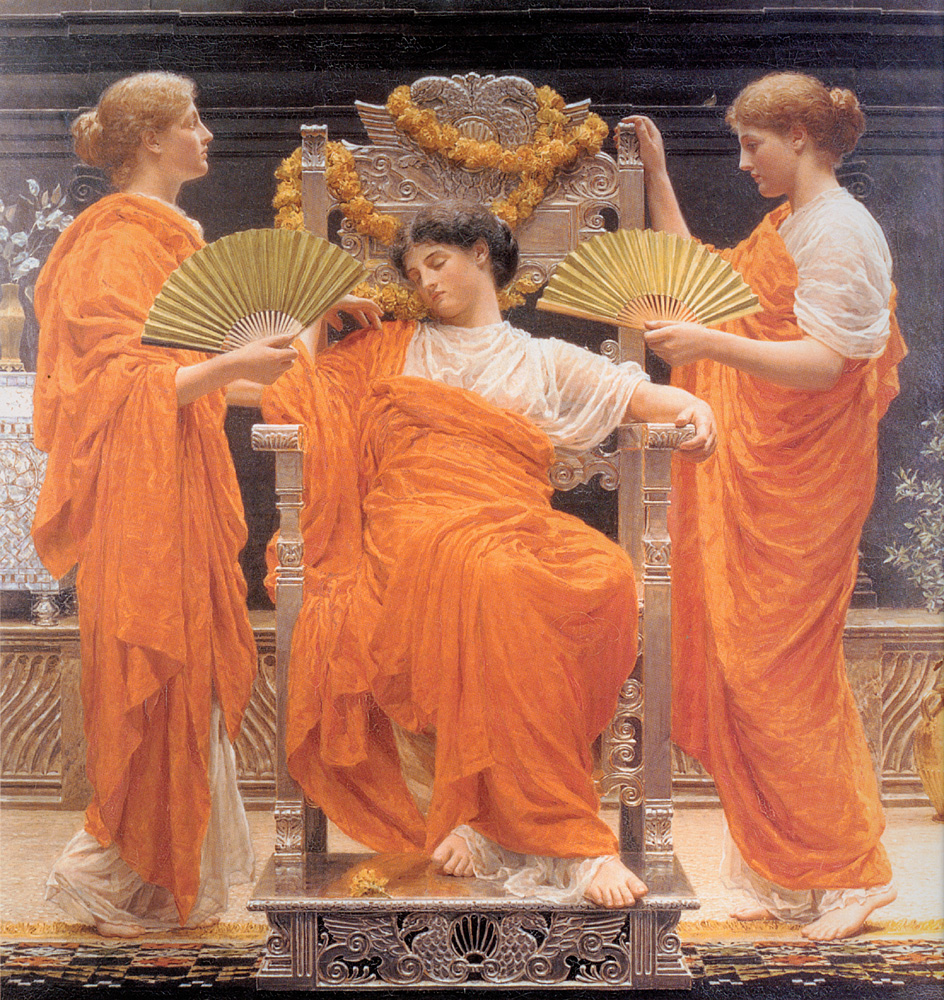
Midsummer, 1887

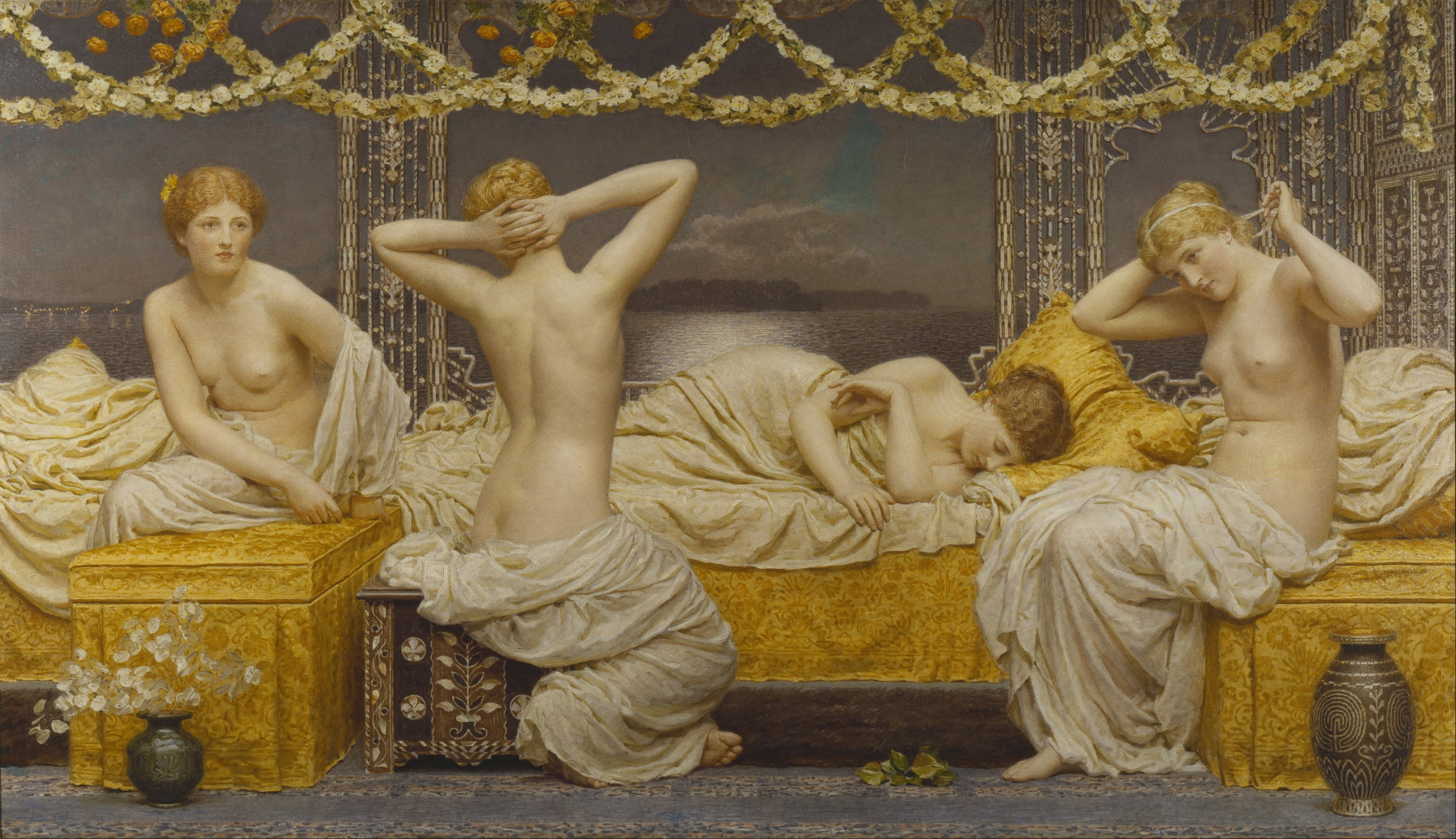
A Summer Night, c. 1887 or 1890

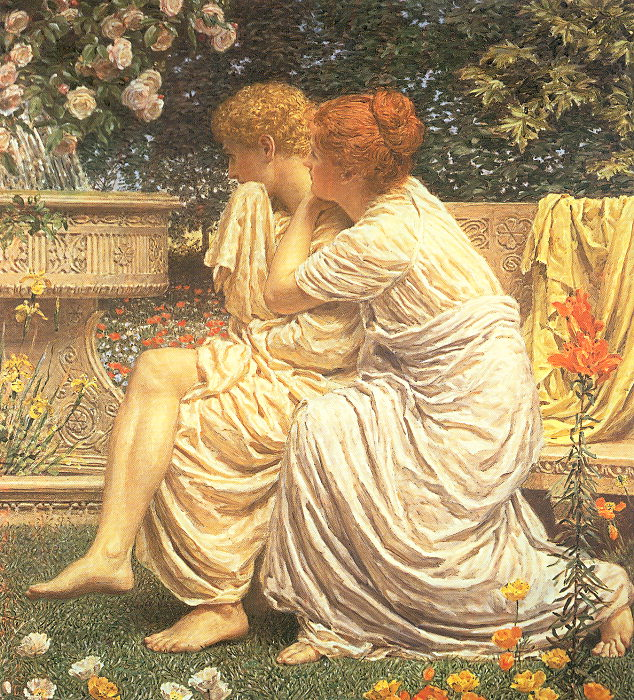
An Idyll, 1893

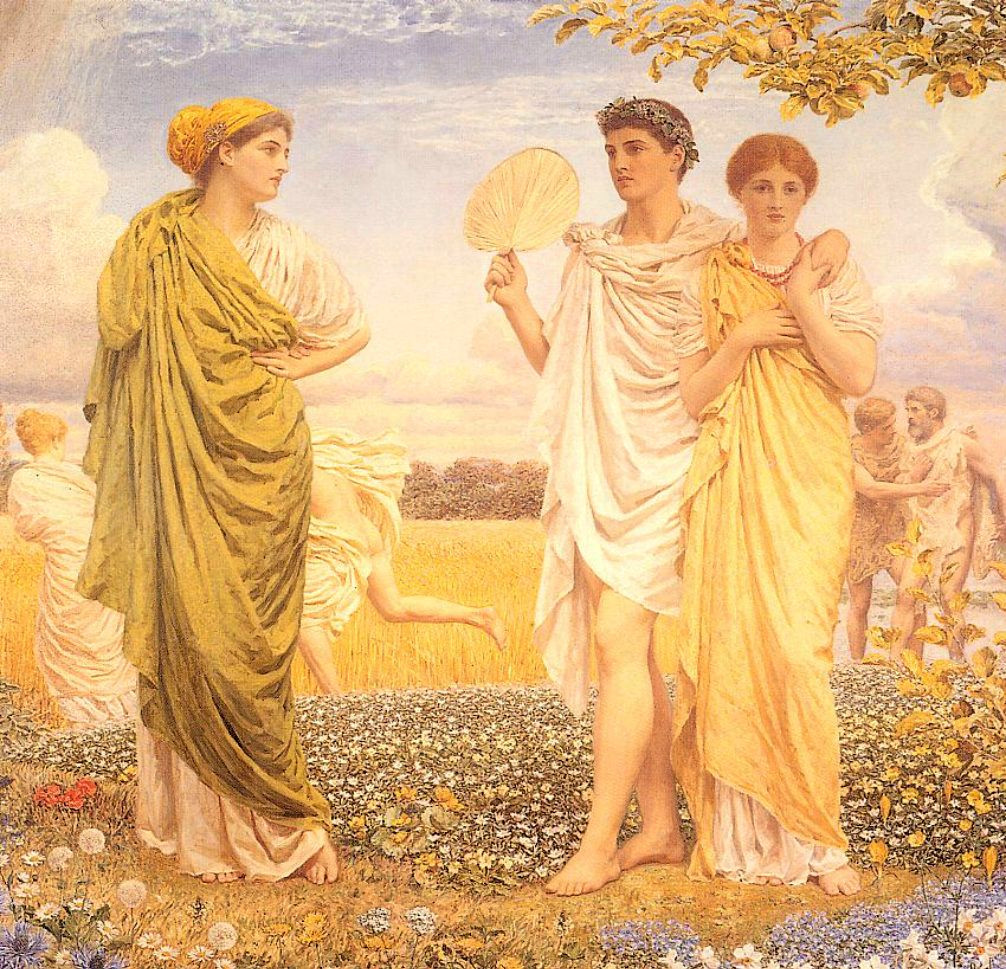
The Loves of the Winds and the Seasons, 1893
