= Judges 8 =

Book of Judges, chapter 8

- ← chapter 7 chapter 9 →
- The pages containing the Book of Judges in Leningrad Codex (1008 CE).
- Book: Book of Judges
- Hebrew Bible part: Nevi'im
- Order in the Hebrew part: 2
- Category: Former Prophets
- Christian Bible part: Old Testament (Heptateuch)
- Order in the Christian part: 7

Judges 8 is the eighth chapter of the Book of Judges in the Old Testament or the Hebrew Bible. According to Jewish tradition the book was attributed to the prophet Samuel, but modern scholars view it as part of the Deuteronomistic History, which spans the books of Deuteronomy to 2 Kings, attributed to nationalistic and devotedly Yahwistic writers during the time of the reformer Judean king Josiah in 7th century BCE. This chapter records the activities of judge Gideon, belonging to a section comprising Judges 6 to 9 and a bigger section of Judges 6:1 to 16:31.

== Text ==
This chapter was originally written in the Hebrew language. It is divided into 35 verses.

=== Textual witnesses ===
Some early manuscripts containing the text of this chapter in Hebrew are of the Masoretic Text tradition, which includes the Codex Cairensis (895), Aleppo Codex (10th century), and Codex Leningradensis (1008). Fragments containing parts of this chapter in Hebrew were found among the Dead Sea Scrolls including 1Q6 (1QJudg; < 68 BCE) with extant verse 1.

Extant ancient manuscripts of a translation into Koine Greek known as the Septuagint (originally was made in the last few centuries BCE) include Codex Vaticanus (B; $\mathfrak{G}$^{B}; 4th century) and Codex Alexandrinus (A; $\mathfrak{G}$^{A}; 5th century). (Note: The whole book of Judges is missing from the extant Codex Sinaiticus.)

== Analysis ==
A linguistic study by Chisholm reveals that the central part in the Book of Judges (Judges 3:7–16:31) can be divided into two panels based on the six refrains that state that the Israelites did evil in Yahweh's eyes:

Panel One

A 3:7 ויעשו בני ישראל את הרע בעיני יהוה

And the children of Israel did evil in the sight of the LORD (KJV)
B 3:12 ויספו בני ישראל לעשות הרע בעיני יהוה

And the children of Israel did evil again in the sight of the LORD

B 4:1 ויספו בני ישראל לעשות הרע בעיני יהוה

And the children of Israel did evil again in the sight of the LORD

Panel Two

A 6:1 ויעשו בני ישראל הרע בעיני יהוה

And the children of Israel did evil in the sight of the LORD
B 10:6 ויספו בני ישראל לעשות הרע בעיני יהוה

And the children of Israel did evil again in the sight of the LORD

B 13:1 ויספו בני ישראל לעשות הרע בעיני יהוה

And the children of Israel did evil again in the sight of the LORD

Furthermore, from the linguistic evidence, the verbs used to describe the Lord's response to Israel's sin have chiastic patterns and can be grouped to fit the division above:

Panel One

3:8 וימכרם, "and he sold them," from the root מָכַר, makar
3:12 ויחזק, "and he strengthened," from the root חָזַק, khazaq
4:2 וימכרם, "and he sold them," from the root מָכַר, makar

Panel Two

6:1 ויתנם, "and he gave them," from the root נָתַן, nathan
10:7 וימכרם, "and he sold them," from the root מָכַר, makar
13:1 ויתנם, "and he gave them," from the root נָתַן, nathan

Chapters 6 to 9 record the Gideon/Abimelech Cycle, which has two major parts:

1. the account of Gideon (6:1–8:32)
2. the account of Abimelech (8:33–9:57).

The Abimelech account is really a sequel of the Gideon account, resolving a number of complications originated in the Gideon narrative.

In this narrative, for the first time Israel's appeal to Yahweh was met with a stern rebuke rather than immediate deliverance, and the whole cycle addresses the issue of infidelity and religious deterioration.

The Gideon Narrative (Judges 6:1–8:32) consists of five sections along concentric lines — thematic parallels exist between the first (A) and fifth (A') sections as well as between the second (B) and fourth (B') sections, whereas the third section (C) stands alone — forming a symmetrical pattern as follows:

A. Prologue to Gideon (6:1–10)

B. God's plan of deliverance through the call of Gideon—the story of two altars (6:11–32)

B1. The first altar—call and commissioning of Gideon (6:11–24)
B2. The second altar—the charge to clean house (6:25–32)

C. Gideon's personal faith struggle (6:33–7:18)

a. The Spirit-endowed Gideon mobilizes 4 tribes against the Midianites, though lacking confidence in God's promise (6:33–35)

b. Gideon seeks a sign from God with two fleecings to confirm the promise that Yahweh will give Midian into his hand (6:36-40)

c. With the fearful Israelites having departed, God directs Gideon to go down to the water for the further reduction of his force (7:1–8)
c'. With fear still in Gideon himself, God directs Gideon to go down to the enemy camp to overhear the enemy (7:9–11)

b'. God provides a sign to Gideon with the dream of a Midianite and its interpretation to confirm the promise that Yahweh will give Midian into his hand (7:12–14)

a'. The worshiping Gideon mobilizes his force of 300 for a surprise attack against the Midianites, fully confident in God's promise (7:15–18)

B'. God's deliverance from the Midianites—the story of two battles (7:19–8:21)

B1'. The first battle (Cisjordan) (7:19–8:3)
B2'. The second battle (Transjordan) (8:4–21)

A'. Epilogue to Gideon (8:22–32)

The Abimelech Narrative (Judges 8:33–9:5), as the sequel (and conclusion) to the Gideon Narrative (6:1–8:32), contains a prologue (8:33–35), followed by two parts:

1. Part 1: Abimelech's rise (9:1–24)
2. Part 2: Abimelech's decline (9.25–57).

Each of these two parts has a threefold division with interlinks between the divisions, so it displays the following structure:

Prologue (8:33–35)
Part 1: Abimelech's Rise (9:1–24)

A. Abimelech's Treachery Against the House of Jerub-Baal (9:1–6)
B. Jotham's Four-Part Plant Fable and Conditional Curse (9:7–21)

a. The Fable (9:7–15)
b. The Curse (9:16–21)

C. The Narrator's First Assertion (9:22–24)

Part 2: Abimelech's Demise (9:25–57)

A. Shechem's Two Acts of Treachery Against Abimelech (9:25–41)
B. The Fable's Fulfillment: Abimelech's Three Acts of Repression (9:42–55)

a. First Act of Repression (9:42–45)
b. Second Act of Repression (9:46–49)
c. Third Act of Repression (9:50–55)

C The Narrator's Second Assertion (9:56–57)

== Gideon appeases the Ephraimites (8:1–3) ==
Verses 1–3 in this chapter should be one section with (and serves as an epilogue to) 7:19–25. The confrontation with the Ephraimites was a dangerous moment for Gideon, because the Ephraimites were not included in the initial call-up but once called they were able to capture and kill two Midianites leaders (Oreb and Zeeb), and it seemed to reflect a rivalry between the tribes of Ephraim and Manasseh, the two leading northerner Israel tribes. Gideon's successful diplomatic way to handle the provocations by the Ephraimites contrasts Jephthah's lack of diplomacy in Judges 12:1–6. Gideon used a double metaphor from the motif of 'winepress': "gleanings" ('what is gathered after harvest') which are generally more than the "vintage" ('the grape harvest itself'), to placate the Ephraimites that the capture and execution of enemy leaders are more glorious than the early rout by Gideon.

== Gideon defeats Zebah and Zalmunna (8:4–21) ==
Gideon's interactions with the people of Succoth and Penuel show similarities to David's interactions with Nabal, the first husband of Abigail (1 Samuel 25), and Ahimelech, the priest of Nob (1 Samuel 21), that a popular hero asks for logistic support for his fighting men. As in case of David and Nabal, Gideon's requests were denied (even accompanied with taunts; verses 6, 8) and threats ensued. Gideon did succeed to capture the Midianite kings Zebah and Zalmunna, then he made good his threat to punish those cities (verses 10–17). Verses 13–14 are often cited as proof of Israelite literacy at that period of time, that an ordinary young man from Succoth was literate to write down names of the officers in his town. Verses 18–21 show Gideon's motivation to pursue the two kings of Midianites, that is, a personal vendetta for the killing of Gideon's brothers by the Midianites. Warriors expect to face their equals in battle (cf. Goliath's disdain for the lad David in 1 Samuel 17:42–43; also 2 Samuel 2:20–23), so when the inexperienced son of Gideon was not able to show his courage, the kings, quoting a proverb, requested that Gideon himself, as the leader, killed them as an appropriate death of a king.

=== Verse 5 ===
Then he said to the men of Succoth, "Please give loaves of bread to the people who follow me, for they are exhausted, and I am pursuing Zebah and Zalmunna, kings of Midian."

- "Succoth": (meaning: "shelters"; now modern Tell Deir 'Allah) located where the River Jabbok flows into the Jordan Valley, 7 kilometres (4.3 mi) east of the Jordan River. According to Genesis 33:17, the place was where Jacob built temporary "shelters" (Hebrew sukkot) for his cattle on his way back from Padan-Aram to Canaan.
- "Zebah" means "sacrificial victims", whereas "Zalmunna" means "protection refused", likely pejoratives or distortions of the actual person names.

=== Verse 8 ===
Then he went up from there to Penuel and spoke to them in the same way. And the men of Penuel answered him as the men of Succoth had answered.

- "Penuel": (now modern Telul edh-Dhahab) located 9 kilometres (5.6 mi) east of Succoth, up the course of River Jabbok. The name is a variant of the word "Peniel" ("the face of God"), the name of the place where Jacob 'wrestled' with God on the way back from Padan-Aram to Canaan (Genesis 32:22–32), and both forms of the name are found in adjacent verses in Genesis 32:30–31 (פְּנִיאֵ֑ל, pə-nî-'êl in verse 30; פְּנוּאֵ֑ל, pə-nū-'êl in verse 31).

=== Verse 20 ===
And he said to Jether his firstborn, "Rise, kill them!" But the youth would not draw his sword; for he was afraid, because he was still a youth.

The introduction of Gideon's son shortly followed the mention of kingship – that the enemies saw Gideon's brother like "sons of the king" (Hebrew: ha-melekh) – and would be followed by the offer from the Israelites to Gideon "and his son and his grandson" to be their king (verse 22). The hesitancy of Jether, Gideon's firstborn son, to kill two "real" foreign kings would contrast to the determination of Abimelech, Gideon's last-mentioned son, to kill all his brothers in the next episode.

== Gideon rejects the offer of kingship (8:22–28) ==
The Gideon Narrative formally ends at Judges 8:28 with the statement that Israel's enemies were subdued and the land had rest for 40 years. Gideon wisely rejected the hereditary kingship offered by the people of Israel (cf. 1 Samuel 8) with the theologically correct answer (verse 23). However, Gideon did not stop there, as recounted in verses 24–27, he proceeded with requesting the people to give him gold and with that he made an ephod which would become a local cultic object (just like the golden calf episode in Exodus 32) and this tarnishes the positive assessment of Gideon,

=== Verse 23 ===
But Gideon said to them, "I will not rule over you, nor shall my son rule over you; the LORD shall rule over you."

- "Rule" from Hebrew root word "mšl" used three times to make Gidieon's reply emphatic.

== Transition from Gideon to Abimelech (8:29–35) ==
Verses 29–32 serve as a transitional paragraph to introduce Abimelech's humble origins (verse 31; cf. 9:1), pointing a distinction between him as "one" against "seventy" previously mentioned sons of Gideon. Verses 33–35 resume the conventionalized pattern of the judges: after the death of a God-fearing leader, Israel wandered off the covenant with YHWH, worshipping Canaanite deities, and abandoning loyalty to YHWH and the house of Gideon.

=== Verse 31 ===
And his concubine who was in Shechem also bore him a son, whose name he called Abimelech.

- "Abimelech": means "my father is king", which indicates a contradiction between what Gideon said in public with what he actually practised, that Gideon basically founded a dynasty, although not in name.

== See also ==
- Abiezer
- Abiezrites
- Baalberith
- Baalim
- Children of Israel
- Ephod
- Ishmaelites
- Israelites
- Joash
- Jogbehah
- Jordan River
- Karkor
- Land of Israel
- Midianite
- Nobah
- Ophrah
- Shofar
- Succoth
- Tribe of Ephraim
- Related Bible parts: Judges 6, Judges 7, Judges 9

== Sources ==
- Chisholm, Robert B. Jr. (2009). "The Chronology of the Book of Judges: A Linguistic Clue to Solving a Pesky Problem" (PDF). Journal of the Evangelical Theological Society. 52 (2): 247–55. Archived from the original (PDF) on 2022-11-08.
- Coogan, Michael David (2007). Coogan, Michael David; Brettler, Marc Zvi; Newsom, Carol Ann; Perkins, Pheme (eds.). The New Oxford Annotated Bible with the Apocryphal/Deuterocanonical Books: New Revised Standard Version, Issue 48 (Augmented 3rd ed.). Oxford University Press. ISBN 978-0-19-528881-0.
- Fitzmyer, Joseph A. (2008). A Guide to the Dead Sea Scrolls and Related Literature. Grand Rapids, MI: William B. Eerdmans Publishing Company. ISBN 978-0-8028-6241-9.
- Halley, Henry H. (1965). Halley's Bible Handbook: an abbreviated Bible commentary (24th (revised) ed.). Zondervan Publishing House. ISBN 0-310-25720-4.
- Hayes, Christine (2015). Introduction to the Bible. Yale University Press. ISBN 978-0-300-18827-1.
- Niditch, Susan (2007). "10. Judges". In Barton, John; Muddiman, John (eds.). The Oxford Bible Commentary (first (paperback) ed.). Oxford University Press. pp. 176–191. ISBN 978-0-19-927718-6.
- Ulrich, Eugene, ed. (2010). The Biblical Qumran Scrolls: Transcriptions and Textual Variants. Brill.
- Webb, Barry G. (2012). The Book of Judges. New International Commentary on the Old Testament. Eerdmans Publishing Company. ISBN 978-0-8028-2628-2.
- Würthwein, Ernst (1995). The Text of the Old Testament. Translated by Rhodes, Erroll F. Grand Rapids, MI: Wm. B. Eerdmans. ISBN 0-8028-0788-7.
- Younger, K. Lawson (2002). Judges and Ruth. The NIV Application Commentary. Zondervan. ISBN 978-0-310-20636-1.
