= The Great Leaders =

- Directed by: Marcello Baldi; Francisco Pérez-Dolz
- Written by: Ottavio Jemma; Flavio Nicolini; Marcello Baldi; Tonino Guerra
- Produced by: Toni Di Carlo
- Starring: Anton Geesink; Ivo Garrani; Rosalba Neri; Fernando Rey
- Cinematography: Marcello Masciocchi
- Edited by: Giuliana Attenni
- Music by: Teo Usuelli
- Production companies: S. P. Film Roma; S. P. Films Madrid
- Distributed by: MGM
- Release date: 1965
- Running time: 102 minutes
- Countries: Italy; Spain
- Languages: English; Italian

The Great Leaders (Italian: I grandi condottieri, Spanish: Los jueces de la Biblia) is a 1965 Italian-Spanish historical film directed by Marcello Baldi and Francisco Pérez-Dolz. Consisting of two segments, the first half tells the story of Gideon, while the second the story of Samson.

The film was later retitled Great Leaders of the Bible for DVD releases.

== Plot ==
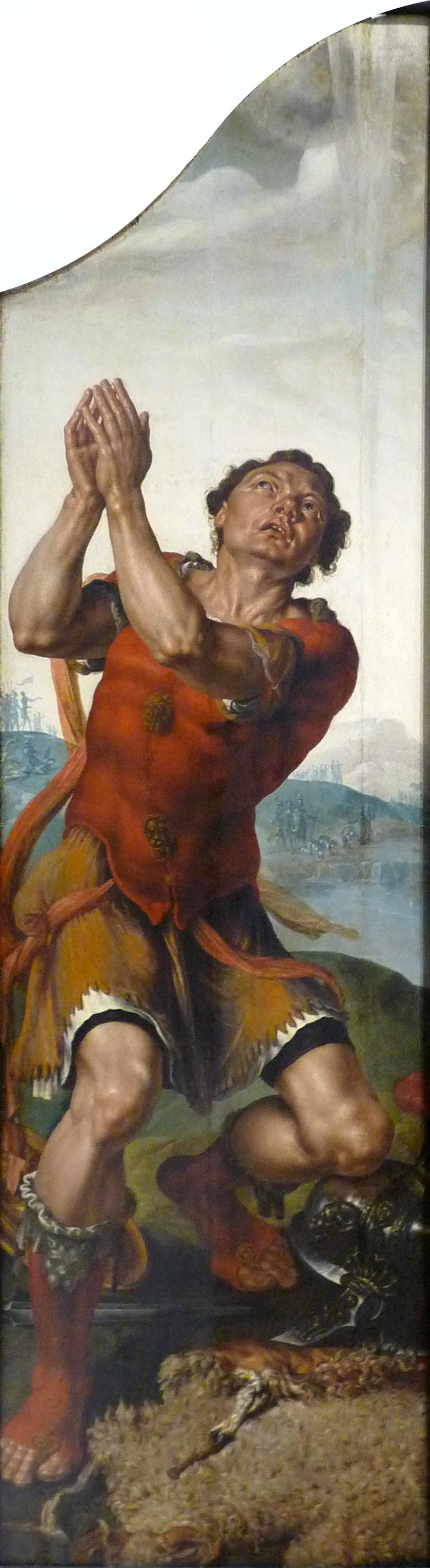
The film depicts the proof that Gideon seeks from Jehovah (Judges 6:39). Painting by Maarten van Heemskerck.

Israelites are faulted for worshipping Baal instead of Jehovah. Jehovah is said to have abandoned the Israelites for worshiping false gods instead of Jehovah himself. Gideon chooses an army of 300 (Judges 7:8) to wage war against the Midianites. Gideon delivers Israelites from the hands of Midianite raiders. Gideon captures the kings of Midian Zebah and Zalmunna (Judges 8:10). After Gideon's son Jeter shies away from decapitating the two Midianite kings, Gideon slays the kings personally (Judges 8:21).

== Cast ==
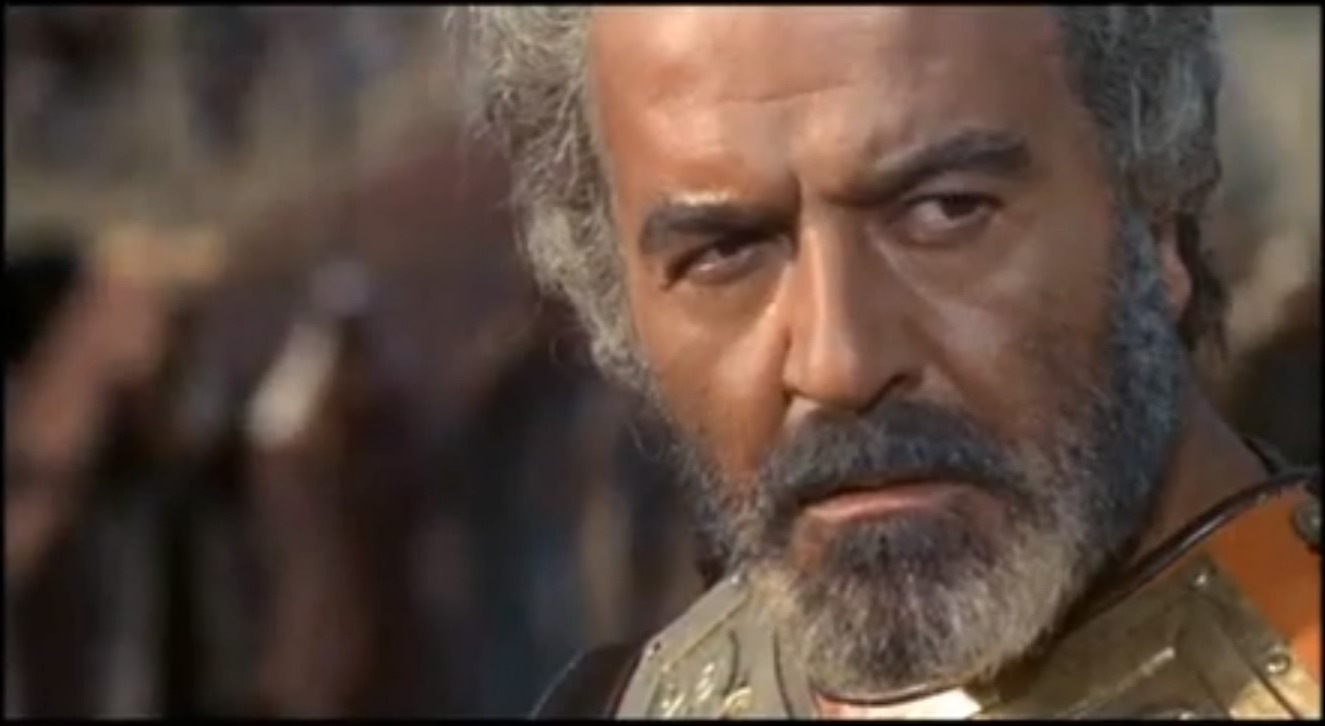
Ivo Garrani as Gideon in a film scene

The credits in the Italian version list the cast in the following order:

- Anton Geesink as Samson ("Samson")
- Ivo Garrani as Gideon ("Gideon")
- Rosalba Neri as Delilah ("Samson")
- Fernando Rey as the stranger ("Gideon")
- Luz Márquez as the woman of Gaza ("Samson")
- Paolo Gozlino as the prince of Gaza ("Samson")
- Ana María Noé as Samson's mother ("Samson")
- Maruchi Fresno as Gideon's wife ("Gideon")
- Giorgio Cerioni as Jether, Gideon's son ("Gideon")
- Piero Gerlini as Farim ("Samson")
- Lucio De Santis as Nabur ("Samson")
- Sergio Ammirata as a Philistine general ("Samson")
- Barta Barri as Fara ("Gideon") (credited as Barta Barry)
- José Jaspe as Zeba ("Gideon") (credited as Jose Jaspes)
- Consalvo Dell'Arti as a follower of Samson ("Samson")

Uncredited

- Mirko Ellis

== Production ==
In early January 1965, Dutch judo champion Anton Geesink said to the press, "An Italian film studio has proposed that I play the lead role of Samson in a spectacular movie. The sum they are offering is substantial, but even if they offered me a million florins, I would still need to think it over." He was hesistant because he did not want to leave his gym and also needed to train for the following judo championship in October. Geesink eventually accepted the offer but also continued his training for the 1965 World Judo Championships. He made a screen test in Rome in February.

The film was scheduled to begin principal photography between February and March 1965 in Rome. In July 1965, Geesink was filming in Rome and told the Associated Press, "I must admit that the job of being an actor is more exhausting than any training or bout I ever had."
