= Judges 9 =

Book of Judges, chapter 9

- ← chapter 8 chapter 10 →
- The pages containing the Book of Judges in Leningrad Codex (1008 CE).
- Book: Book of Judges
- Hebrew Bible part: Nevi'im
- Order in the Hebrew part: 2
- Category: Former Prophets
- Christian Bible part: Old Testament (Heptateuch)
- Order in the Christian part: 7

Judges 9 is the ninth chapter of the Book of Judges in the Old Testament or the Hebrew Bible. According to Jewish tradition the book was attributed to the prophet Samuel, but modern scholars view it as part of the Deuteronomistic History, which spans the books of Deuteronomy to 2 Kings, attributed to nationalistic and devotedly Yahwistic writers during the time of the reformer Judean king Josiah in 7th century BCE. This chapter records the activities of judge Gideon's son, Abimelech, belonging to a section comprising Judges 6 to 9 and a bigger section of Judges 6:1 to 16:31.

== Text ==
This chapter was originally written in the Hebrew language. It is divided into 57 verses.

=== Textual witnesses ===
Some early manuscripts containing the text of this chapter in Hebrew are of the Masoretic Text tradition, which includes the Codex Cairensis (895), Aleppo Codex (10th century), and Codex Leningradensis (1008). Fragments containing parts of this chapter in Hebrew were found among the Dead Sea Scrolls including 1Q6 (1QJudg; < 68 BCE) with extant verses 1–3, 5–6, 28–31, 40–43, 48–49.

Extant ancient manuscripts of a translation into Koine Greek known as the Septuagint (originally was made in the last few centuries BCE) include Codex Vaticanus (B; $\mathfrak{G}$^{B}; 4th century) and Codex Alexandrinus (A; $\mathfrak{G}$^{A}; 5th century). (Note: The whole book of Judges is missing from the extant Codex Sinaiticus.)

== Analysis ==
A linguistic study by Chisholm reveals that the central part in the Book of Judges (Judges 3:7–16:31) can be divided into two panels based on the six refrains that state that the Israelites did evil in Yahweh's eyes:

Panel One

A 3:7 ויעשו בני ישראל את הרע בעיני יהוה

And the children of Israel did evil in the sight of the LORD (KJV)
B 3:12 ויספו בני ישראל לעשות הרע בעיני יהוה

And the children of Israel did evil again in the sight of the LORD

B 4:1 ויספו בני ישראל לעשות הרע בעיני יהוה

And the children of Israel did evil again in the sight of the LORD

Panel Two

A 6:1 ויעשו בני ישראל הרע בעיני יהוה

And the children of Israel did evil in the sight of the LORD
B 10:6 ויספו בני ישראל לעשות הרע בעיני יהוה

And the children of Israel did evil again in the sight of the LORD

B 13:1 ויספו בני ישראל לעשות הרע בעיני יהוה

And the children of Israel did evil again in the sight of the LORD

Furthermore, from the linguistic evidence, the verbs used to describe the Lord's response to Israel's sin have chiastic patterns and can be grouped to fit the division above:

Panel One

3:8 וימכרם, "and he sold them," from the root מָכַר, makar
3:12 ויחזק, "and he strengthened," from the root חָזַק, khazaq
4:2 וימכרם, "and he sold them," from the root מָכַר, makar

Panel Two

6:1 ויתנם, "and he gave them," from the root נָתַן, nathan
10:7 וימכרם, "and he sold them," from the root מָכַר, makar
13:1 ויתנם, "and he gave them," from the root נָתַן, nathan

Chapters 6 to 9 record the Gideon/Abimelech Cycle, which has two major parts:

1. the account of Gideon (6:1–8:32)
2. the account of Abimelech (8:33–9:57).

The Abimelech Narrative is really a sequel (and conclusion) of the Gideon account, resolving a number of complications originated in the Gideon Narrative. It contains a prologue (8:33–35), followed by two parts:

1. Part 1: Abimelech's rise (9:1–24)
2. Part 2: Abimelech's decline (9.25–57).

Each of these two parts has a threefold division with interlinks between the divisions, so it displays the following structure:

Prologue (8:33–35)
Part 1: Abimelech's Rise (9:1–24)

A. Abimelech's Treachery Against the House of Jerub-Baal (9:1–6)
B. Jotham's Four-Part Plant Fable and Conditional Curse (9:7–21)

a. The Fable (9:7–15)
b. The Curse (9:16–21)

C. The Narrator's First Assertion (9:22–24)

Part 2: Abimelech's Demise (9:25–57)

A. Shechem's Two Acts of Treachery Against Abimelech (9:25–41)
B. The Fable's Fulfillment: Abimelech's Three Acts of Repression (9:42–55)

a. First Act of Repression (9:42–45)
b. Second Act of Repression (9:46–49)
c. Third Act of Repression (9:50–55)

C The Narrator's Second Assertion (9:56–57)

== The rise of Abimelech (9:1–24) ==
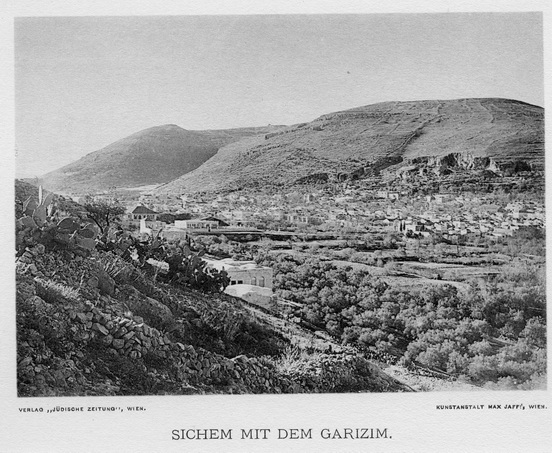
Shechem (modern Nablus) and Mount Gerizim at the background (south of the city), viewed from Mount Ebal (north of the city) in 1912.

After Gideon's death, his son of a concubine (a secondary wife; Judges 8:31), Abimelech, appealed to his mother's kin in Shechem for support in his plans to take over the political power. Using the money from his kinsmen Abimelech hired mercenaries (labeled as 'empty' and 'wanton' people; cf. Genesis 49:4) to kill all other Gideon's sons, a total 70 of them. Gideon's youngest son of the seventy, Jotham, survived the slaughter and went to the top of Mount Gerizim to deliver a mashal ("parable") to the people about useful trees, which decline rulership as beneath them, allow the useless and prickly bramble to reign over them with disastrous ending. Jotham's speech was a righteous complaint of a wronged person that would bring about vengeance through divine intervention, as the subsequent story of Abimelech's decline shows. The parable is often recited on Tu BiShvat in Israel until today. The bramble or "jujube" was translated from Hebrew אטד (atad), that is, Ziziphus spina-christi ("Christ's thorn") which according the Christian tradition was used to make Crown of thorns placed on the head of Jesus Christ during his crucifixion.

=== Verse 5 ===
And he went to his father's house at Ophrah and killed his brothers the sons of Jerubbaal, seventy men, on one stone. But Jotham the youngest son of Jerubbaal was left, for he hid himself.

- "Ophrah": A place within the territory of the tribe of Manasseh in the west of Jordan, only mentioned in 5 verses of Hebrew Bible (Old Testament): Judges 6:11, 6:24, 8:27, 8:32, 9:5, all in connection with Gideon and with his son Abimelech, because it is a family property, belonging to Joash the Abiezrite, the father of Gideon. Apparently located not far from the plain of Esdraelon (Judges 6:33f).
- "Seventy men": the same number as Ahab's sons slaughtered in Jehu's time (1 Kings 10:1–7.
- "Jotham": his survival recalls the survival of Joash, the son of Ahaziah, king of Judah (1 Kings 11:1–2).

OpenBible lists 7 possible identifications in modern places:

1. Afula (55% confidence)
2. Khirbet Taiyibeh (20% confidence)
3. Ramat Rahel (less than 10% confidence)
4. Et Taiyibeh (less than 10% confidence)
5. Silat ad Dhahr (less than 10% confidence)
6. Farata (less than 10% confidence)
7. Tell el Farah (less than 10% confidence)

== The demise of Abimelech (9:25–57) ==
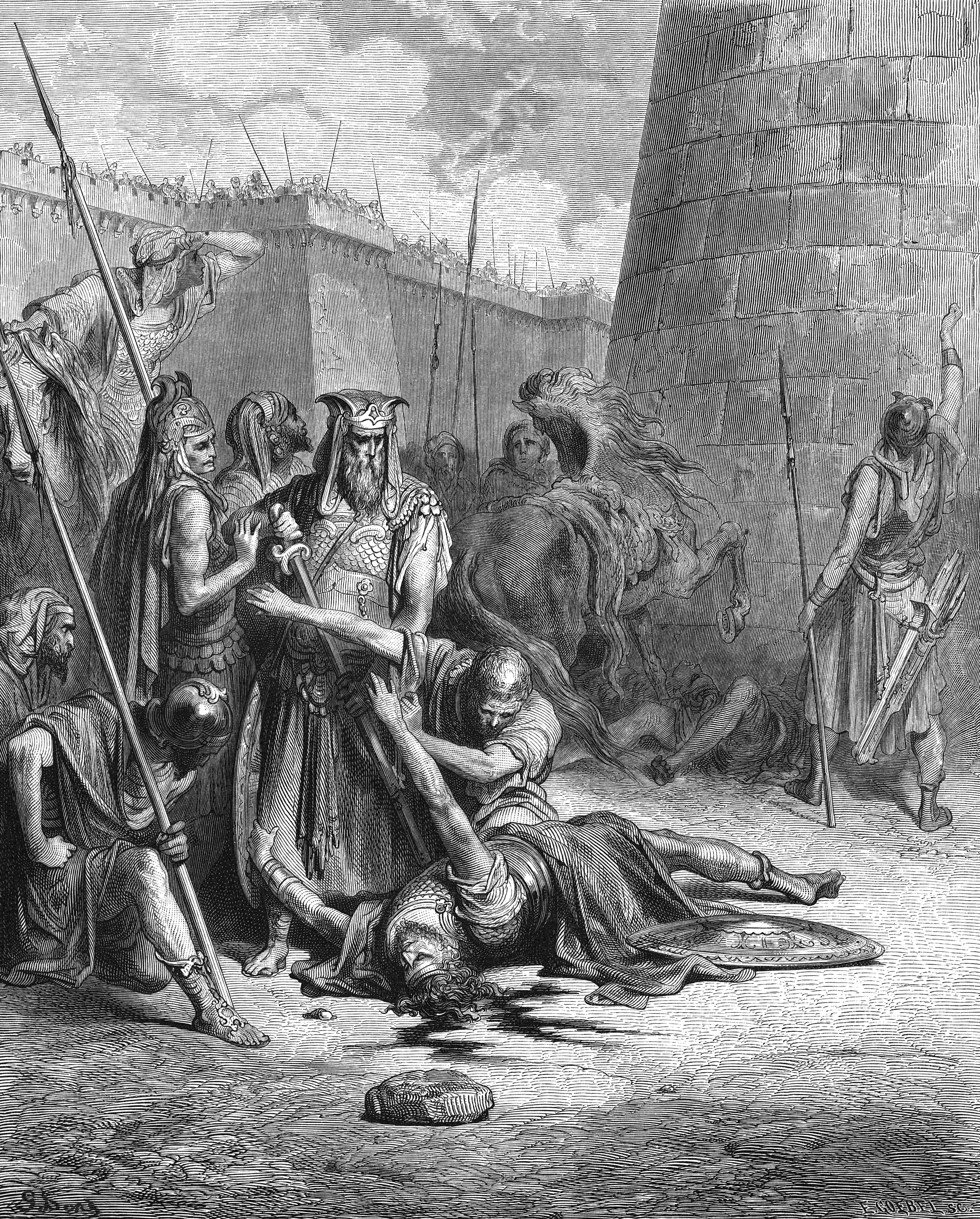
"Death of Abimelech" by Gustave Doré. 1866

As predicted by Jotham, the evil coup without 'good faith' was doomed to failure (verses 16–20) and that those who were disloyal to Gideon (verses 17–18) would also be disloyal to Abimelech. The divine control of Abimelech's demise is stated as YHWH 'sent an evil spirit' between Abimelech and the Shechemites (cf. 1 Samuel 16:14.) The Shechemite chieftains soon transferred their affections to a new strongman while attempting to undermine the Abimelech's leadership credentials through the taunts of some drunken louts. Abimelech and his loyalist, Zebul, succeeded in defeating Gaal, the challenger, and then proceeded to take further vengeance on the people of Shechem (verses 42–49). Abimelech continued with his vengeance at Thebez, another fortress city, but this time, an unnamed woman threw down an upper millstone (a symbol of the woman's domestic realm) and crushed Abimelech's skull. Abimelech quickly begged his armor-bearer to kill him so it wouldn't be said that a woman actually killed him (cf. 2 Samuel 11:21). Abimelech's death concludes the whole Gideon Narrative.

=== Verses 52–53 ===
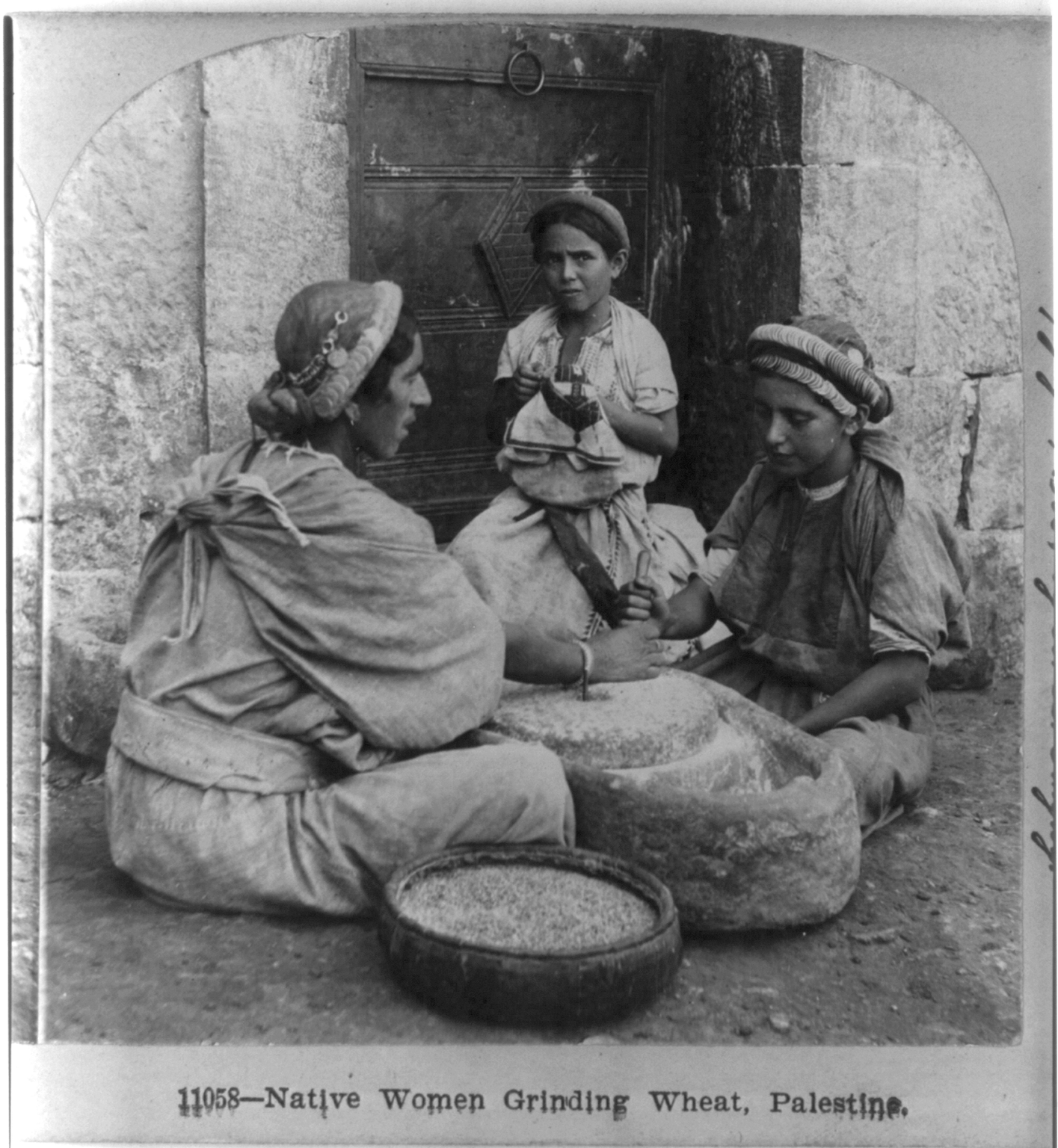
Palestinian women grinding wheat using a hand mill, by rotating the upper (thinner) millstone (using the handle) against the flat top surface of the lower larger stone. 1900.

^{52}And Abimelech came to the tower and fought against it and drew near to the door of the tower to burn it with fire.
^{53}And a certain woman threw an upper millstone on Abimelech's head and crushed his skull.

- "Upper millstone": A hand mill usually consists of an upper millstone (with a handle) and larger lower stone to grind grains placed between the stones. An upper millstone was typically about 2 inches (51 mm) thick and 1 foot (30 cm) in diameter, probably weighed 25–30 pounds (11.4–13.6 kg).

== See also ==
- Arumah
- Baalberith
- Beer
- City gate
- Evil spirit (רוח רעה)
- Ebed, father of Gaal
- Joash
- Meonenim
- Millo
- Parable
- Zebul
- Related Bible parts: Judges 6, Judges 7, Judges 8, 2 Samuel 11

== Sources ==
- Chisholm, Robert B. Jr. (2009). "The Chronology of the Book of Judges: A Linguistic Clue to Solving a Pesky Problem" (PDF). Journal of the Evangelical Theological Society. 52 (2): 247–55. Archived from the original (PDF) on 2022-11-08.
- Coogan, Michael David (2007). Coogan, Michael David; Brettler, Marc Zvi; Newsom, Carol Ann; Perkins, Pheme (eds.). The New Oxford Annotated Bible with the Apocryphal/Deuterocanonical Books: New Revised Standard Version, Issue 48 (Augmented 3rd ed.). Oxford University Press. ISBN 978-0-19-528881-0.
- Fitzmyer, Joseph A. (2008). A Guide to the Dead Sea Scrolls and Related Literature. Grand Rapids, MI: William B. Eerdmans Publishing Company. ISBN 978-0-8028-6241-9.
- Halley, Henry H. (1965). Halley's Bible Handbook: an abbreviated Bible commentary (24th (revised) ed.). Zondervan Publishing House. ISBN 0-310-25720-4.
- Hayes, Christine (2015). Introduction to the Bible. Yale University Press. ISBN 978-0-300-18827-1.
- Niditch, Susan (2007). "10. Judges". In Barton, John; Muddiman, John (eds.). The Oxford Bible Commentary (first (paperback) ed.). Oxford University Press. pp. 176–191. ISBN 978-0-19-927718-6.
- Ulrich, Eugene, ed. (2010). The Biblical Qumran Scrolls: Transcriptions and Textual Variants. Brill.
- Webb, Barry G. (2012). The Book of Judges. New International Commentary on the Old Testament. Eerdmans Publishing Company. ISBN 978-0-8028-2628-2.
- Würthwein, Ernst (1995). The Text of the Old Testament. Translated by Rhodes, Erroll F. Grand Rapids, MI: Wm. B. Eerdmans. ISBN 0-8028-0788-7.
- Younger, K. Lawson (2002). Judges and Ruth. The NIV Application Commentary. Zondervan. ISBN 978-0-310-20636-1.
