= Judges 7 =

Book of Judges, chapter 7

- ← chapter 6 chapter 8 →
- The pages containing the Book of Judges in Leningrad Codex (1008 CE).
- Book: Book of Judges
- Hebrew Bible part: Nevi'im
- Order in the Hebrew part: 2
- Category: Former Prophets
- Christian Bible part: Old Testament (Heptateuch)
- Order in the Christian part: 7

Judges 7 is the seventh chapter of the Book of Judges in the Old Testament or the Hebrew Bible. According to Jewish tradition the book was attributed to the prophet Samuel, but modern scholars view it as part of the Deuteronomistic History, which spans in the books of Deuteronomy to 2 Kings, attributed to nationalistic and devotedly Yahwistic writers during the time of the reformer Judean king Josiah in 7th century BCE. This chapter records the activities of judge Gideon, belonging to a section comprising Judges 6 to 9 and a bigger section of Judges 6:1 to 16:31.

== Text ==
This chapter was originally written in the Hebrew language. It is divided into 25 verses.

=== Textual witnesses ===
Some early manuscripts containing the text of this chapter in Hebrew are of the Masoretic Text tradition, which includes the Codex Cairensis (895), Aleppo Codex (10th century), and Codex Leningradensis (1008).

Extant ancient manuscripts of a translation into Koine Greek known as the Septuagint (originally was made in the last few centuries BCE) include Codex Vaticanus (B; $\mathfrak{G}$^{B}; 4th century) and Codex Alexandrinus (A; $\mathfrak{G}$^{A}; 5th century). (Note: The whole book of Judges is missing from the extant Codex Sinaiticus.)

== Analysis ==
A linguistic study by Chisholm reveals that the central part in the Book of Judges (Judges 3:7–16:31) can be divided into two panels based on the six refrains that state that the Israelites did evil in Yahweh's eyes:

Panel One

A 3:7 ויעשו בני ישראל את הרע בעיני יהוה

And the children of Israel did evil in the sight of the LORD (KJV)
B 3:12 ויספו בני ישראל לעשות הרע בעיני יהוה

And the children of Israel did evil again in the sight of the LORD

B 4:1 ויספו בני ישראל לעשות הרע בעיני יהוה

And the children of Israel did evil again in the sight of the LORD

Panel Two

A 6:1 ויעשו בני ישראל הרע בעיני יהוה

And the children of Israel did evil in the sight of the LORD
B 10:6 ויספו בני ישראל לעשות הרע בעיני יהוה

And the children of Israel did evil again in the sight of the LORD

B 13:1 ויספו בני ישראל לעשות הרע בעיני יהוה

And the children of Israel did evil again in the sight of the LORD

Furthermore from the linguistic evidence, the verbs used to describe the Lord's response to Israel's sin have chiastic patterns and can be grouped to fit the division above:

Panel One

3:8 וימכרם, "and he sold them," from the root מָכַר, makar
3:12 ויחזק, "and he strengthened," from the root חָזַק, khazaq
4:2 וימכרם, "and he sold them," from the root מָכַר, makar

Panel Two

6:1 ויתנם, "and he gave them," from the root נָתַן, nathan
10:7 וימכרם, "and he sold them," from the root מָכַר, makar
13:1 ויתנם, "and he gave them," from the root נָתַן, nathan

Chapters 6 to 9 record the Gideon/Abimelech Cycle, which has two major parts:

1. the account of Gideon (6:1–8:32)
2. the account of Abimelech (8:33–9:57).

The Abimelech account is really a sequel of the Gideon account, resolving a number of complications originated in the Gideon narrative.

In this narrative, for the first time Israel's appeal to Yahweh was met with a stern rebuke rather than immediate deliverence, and the whole cycle addresses the issue of infidelity and religious deterioration.

The Gideon Narrative (6:1–8:32) consists of five sections along concentric lines — thematic parallels exist between the first (A) and fifth (A') sections as well as between the second (B) and fourth (B') sections, whereas the third section (C) stands alone — forming a symmetrical pattern as follows:

A. Prologue to Gideon (6:1–10)

B. God's plan of deliverance through the call of Gideon—the story of two altars (6:11–32)

B1. The first altar—call and commissioning of Gideon (6:11–24)
B2. The second altar—the charge to clean house (6:25–32)

C. Gideon's personal faith struggle (6:33–7:18)

a. The Spirit-endowed Gideon mobilizes 4 tribes against the Midianites, though lacking confidence in God's promise (6:33–35)

b. Gideon seeks a sign from God with two fleecings to confirm the promise that Yahweh will give Midian into his hand (6:36-40)

c. With the fearful Israelites having departed, God directs Gideon to go down to the water for the further reduction of his force (7:1–8)
c'. With fear still in Gideon himself, God directs Gideon to go down to the enemy camp to overhear the enemy (7:9–11)

b'. God provides a sign to Gideon with the dream of the Midianite and its interpretation to confirm the promise that Yahweh will give Midian into his hand (7:12–14)

a'. The worshiping Gideon mobilizes his force of 300 for a surprise attack against the Midianites, fully confident in God's promise (7:15–18)

B'. God's deliverance from the Midianites—the story of two battles (7:19–8:21)

B1'. The first battle (Cisjordan) (7:19–8:3)
B2'. The second battle (Transjordan) (8:4–21)

A'. Epilogue to Gideon (8:22–32)

== Gideon's army of three hundred (7:1–18) ==
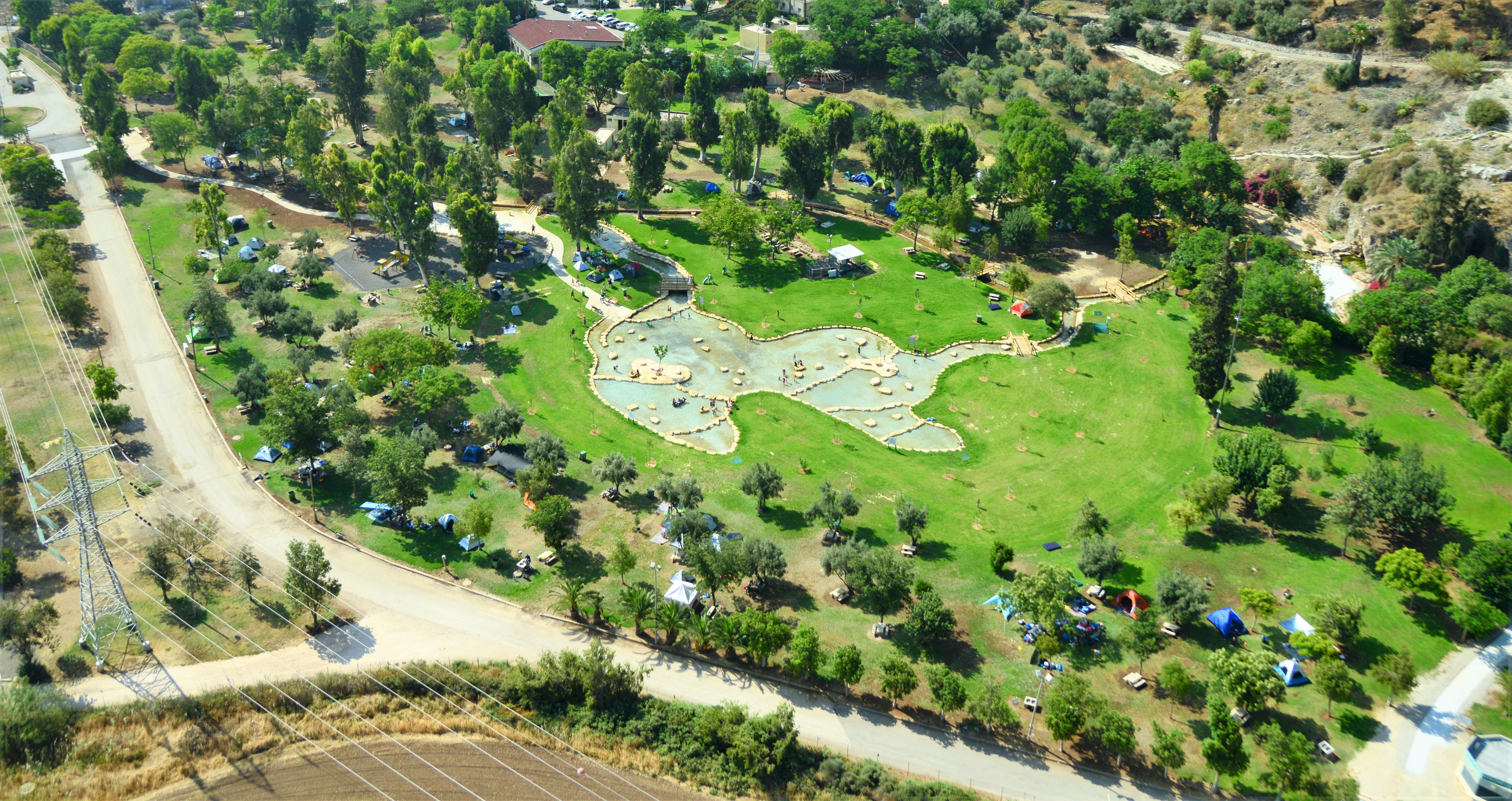
General view of Ma'ayan Harod ("the Spring of Harod"). The Gideon Cave and the slopes of Mount Gilboa can be seen in the right.

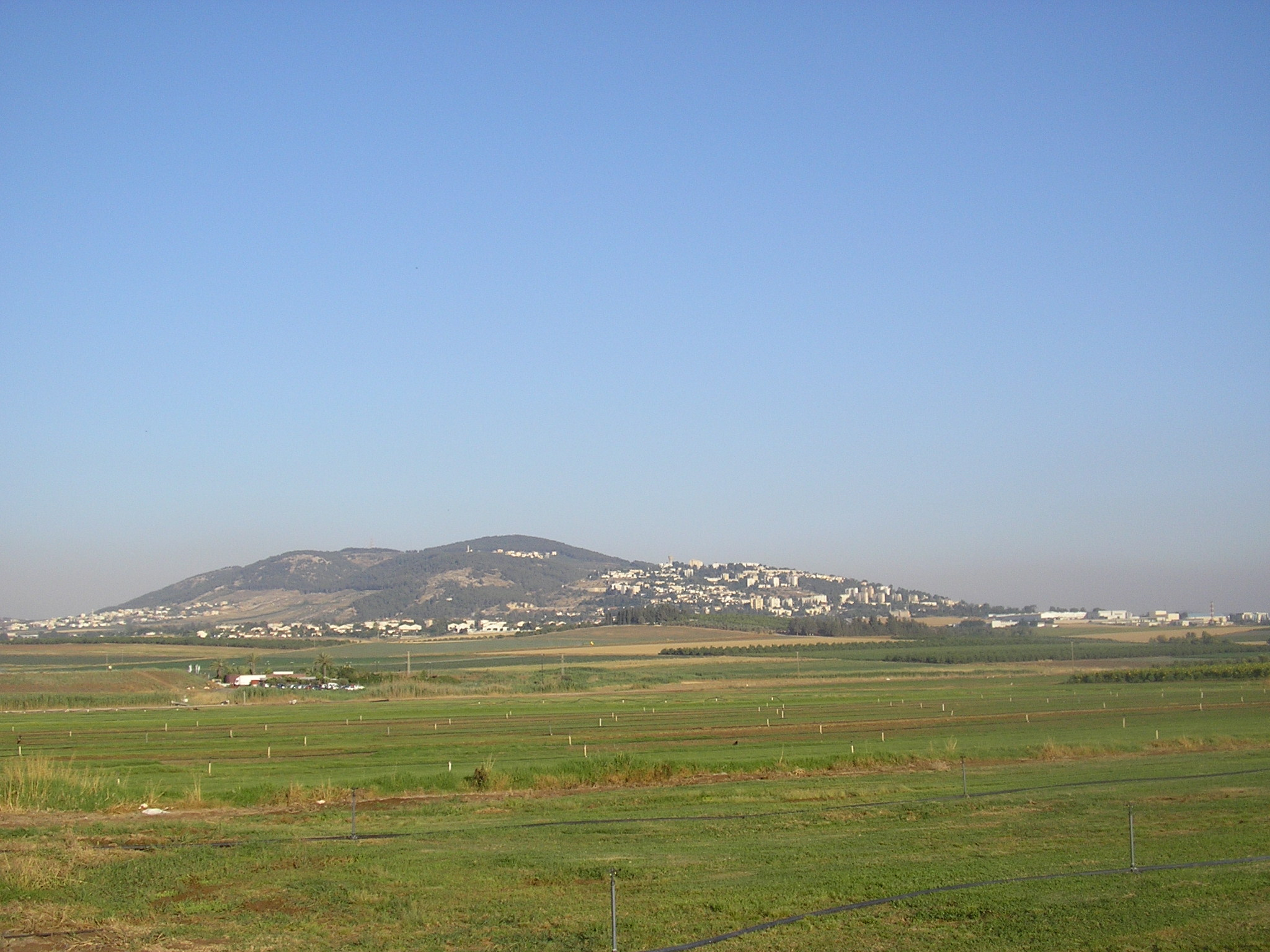
"Givat HaMoreh" ("Hill of Moreh") south of Mount Tabor

Following Deuteronomy 20:5–7, God ordered the Israelites to allow the fearful to return home (verse 2). This battle against the Midianites was not proof of Israelite prowess but of God's glory, so the fighting men did not have to be numerous. God used a test of the mode of drinking to reduce the force to a mere 300 men (verse 8), who were the 'lappers' (cf. 2 Chronicles 25:7-8 and the humbled stance of Israelite kings in the face of war at 2 Chronicles 14:9–15; 12:6; 20:12; 16:8).

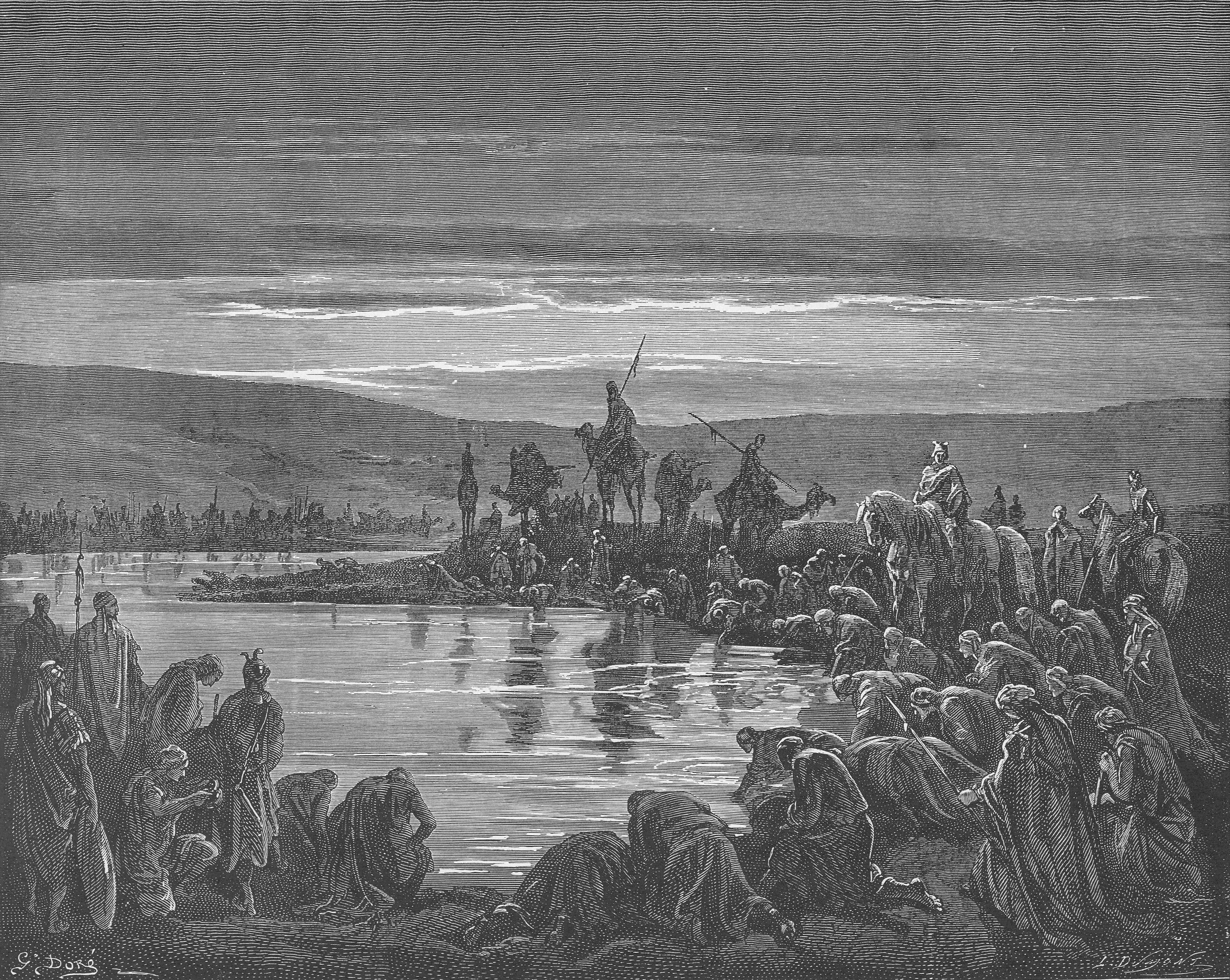
Gideon Chooses 300 Soldiers (Judges 7:1-7). Doré's English Bible 1866. Painting by Gustave Doré (1832–1883)

During Gideon's reconnaissance mission before the battle (a common biblical war motif, cf. Numbers 13; Joshua 2), God offered the 'always humble and hesitant hero' Gideon a positive sign before the battle: through the dream of the enemy which had divinatory significance (cf. Joseph's dreams and his interpretations of other dreams in Genesis 37:5–7; 40:8–22; 41:1–36). A section in Judges 6:36–40 about 'a pair of fleecings' complements the section in 7:12–14 (sections C.b. and C.b'. in the structure) which recounts two Midianites (one telling the dream, one interpreting) to encourage Gideon into action.

=== Verse 1 ===
Then Jerubbaal, who is Gideon, and all the people that were with him, rose up early, and pitched beside the well of Harod: so that the host of the Midianites were on the north side of them, by the hill of Moreh, in the valley.

- "The well of Harod" ("Spring of Harod"): located at the foot of Mount Gilboa at the 'eastern end of the Jezreel Valley', providing a 'view northward across the valley from the southern side'.
- "The hill of Moreh": located to the north of Mount Gilboa in the Jezreel Valley, to the south of Mount Tabor, about 8 miles (13 km) northwest of the well of Harod.

The repetition of the Midianites' location in verses 1 and 8 marks off the boundaries of one section of this passage.

== Gideon defeats Midian (7:19–25) ==
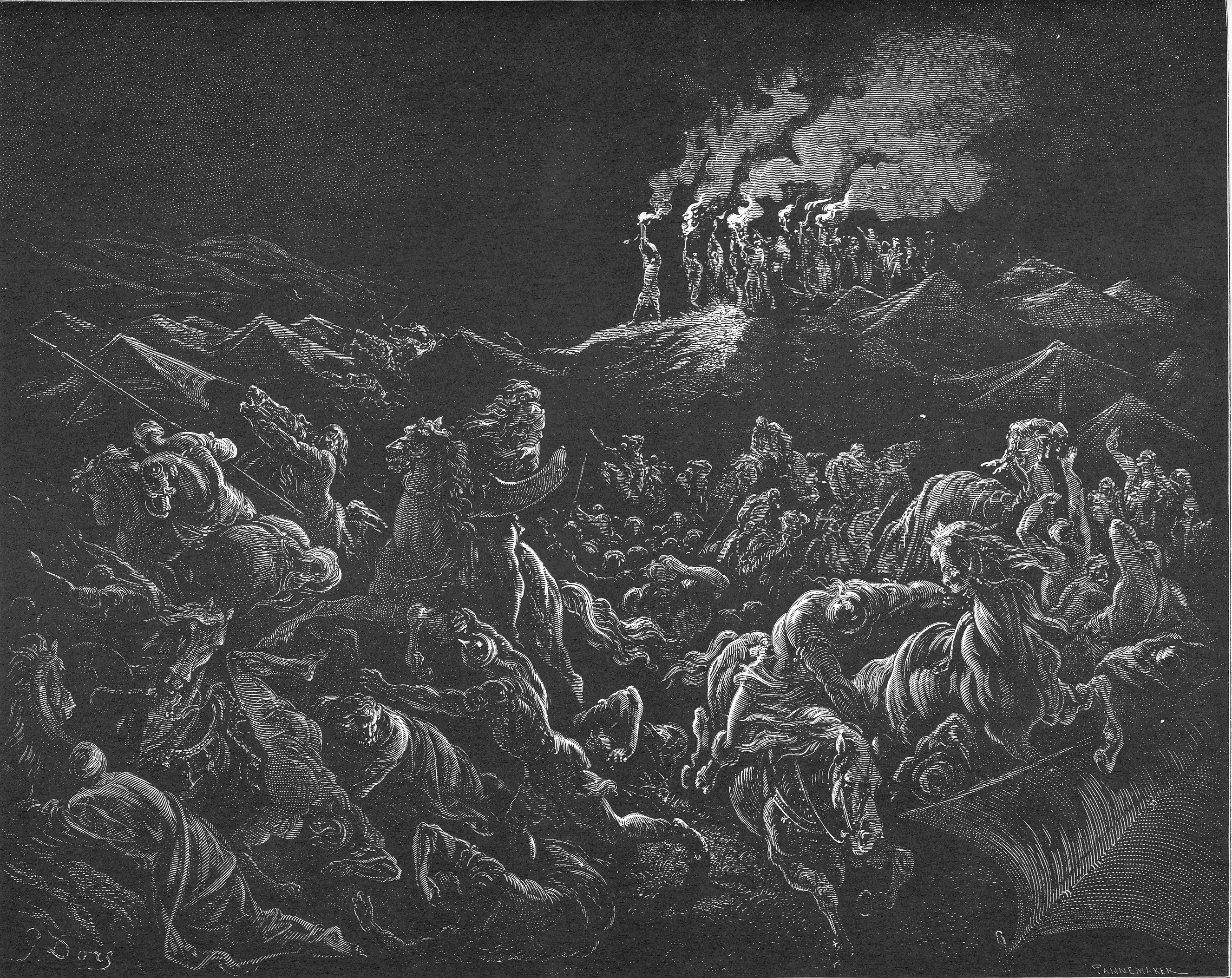
"The Midianites Are Routed". Doré's English Bible 1866.

The detailed instructions before the battle and the mentioned instruments of war recall the battle of Jericho (Joshua 6), including the shouting, the trumpets, the torches, and the breaking jars, which led to the enemy's rout. Then as judge, Gideon called up tribe members of the Israelite confederation to pursue the Midianites (verse 23; cf. Judges 5:14–18). For the final operation, Gideon called up the tribe of Ephraim, whose army captured and beheaded the Midianite commanders Oreb and Zeeb (verses 24–25).

=== Verse 25 ===
And they captured two princes of the Midianites, Oreb and Zeeb. They killed Oreb at the rock of Oreb, and Zeeb they killed at the winepress of Zeeb. They pursued Midian and brought the heads of Oreb and Zeeb to Gideon on the other side of the Jordan.

- "Princes" from Hebrew śārîm, which also means "leaders", or "generals".
- "Oreb" means "raven", whereas "Zeeb" means "wolf", alluding to the Midianites as 'scavengers and predators to Israel'. The settings of their execution: Oreb on a 'rock' and Zeeb at a 'winepress' may recall the winepress and rock in Ophrah where Gideon was called by God to deliver the Israelites from the Midianites (6:11–20).
- "The other side of the Jordan": Gideon and his army had apparently crossed the Jordan to pursue the Midianites, then the Ephraimites followed suit, bringing the heads of Oreb and Zeeb to Gideon.

== See also ==
- Amalekites
- Children of Israel
- Jordan River
- Land of Israel
- Mount Ephraim
- Mount Gilead
- Midianite
- Phurah
- Shofar
- Spirit of the Lord
- Tribe of Asher
- Tribe of Ephraim
- Tribe of Manasseh
- Tribe of Naphtali
- Valley of Jezreel
- Related Bible parts: Judges 6, Judges 8, Judges 9

== Sources ==
- Chisholm, Robert B. Jr. (2009). "The Chronology of the Book of Judges: A Linguistic Clue to Solving a Pesky Problem" (PDF). Journal of the Evangelical Theological Society. 52 (2): 247–55. Archived from the original (PDF) on 2022-11-08.
- Coogan, Michael David (2007). Coogan, Michael David; Brettler, Marc Zvi; Newsom, Carol Ann; Perkins, Pheme (eds.). The New Oxford Annotated Bible with the Apocryphal/Deuterocanonical Books: New Revised Standard Version, Issue 48 (Augmented 3rd ed.). Oxford University Press. ISBN 978-0-19-528881-0.
- Halley, Henry H. (1965). Halley's Bible Handbook: an abbreviated Bible commentary (24th (revised) ed.). Zondervan Publishing House. ISBN 0-310-25720-4.
- Hayes, Christine (2015). Introduction to the Bible. Yale University Press. ISBN 978-0-300-18827-1.
- Niditch, Susan (2007). "10. Judges". In Barton, John; Muddiman, John (eds.). The Oxford Bible Commentary (first (paperback) ed.). Oxford University Press. pp. 176–191. ISBN 978-0-19-927718-6.
- Webb, Barry G. (2012). The Book of Judges. New International Commentary on the Old Testament. Eerdmans Publishing Company. ISBN 978-0-8028-2628-2.
- Würthwein, Ernst (1995). The Text of the Old Testament. Translated by Rhodes, Erroll F. Grand Rapids, MI: Wm. B. Eerdmans. ISBN 0-8028-0788-7.
- Younger, K. Lawson (2002). Judges and Ruth. The NIV Application Commentary. Zondervan. ISBN 978-0-310-20636-1.
