= Judges 6 =

Book of Judges, chapter 6

- ← chapter 5 chapter 7 →
- The pages containing the Book of Judges in Leningrad Codex (1008 CE).
- Book: Book of Judges
- Hebrew Bible part: Nevi'im
- Order in the Hebrew part: 2
- Category: Former Prophets
- Christian Bible part: Old Testament (Heptateuch)
- Order in the Christian part: 7

Judges 6 is the sixth chapter of the Book of Judges in the Old Testament or the Hebrew Bible. According to Jewish tradition the book was attributed to the prophet Samuel, but modern scholars view it as part of the Deuteronomistic History, which spans in the books of Deuteronomy to 2 Kings, attributed to nationalistic and devotedly Yahwistic writers during the time of the reformer Judean king Josiah in 7th century BCE. This chapter records the activities of judge Gideon, belonging to a section comprising Judges 6 to 9 and a bigger section of Judges 6:1 to 16:31.

== Text ==
This chapter was originally written in the Hebrew language. It is divided into 40 verses.

=== Textual witnesses ===
Some early manuscripts containing the text of this chapter in Hebrew are of the Masoretic Text tradition, which includes the Codex Cairensis (895), Aleppo Codex (10th century), and Codex Leningradensis (1008). Fragments containing parts of this chapter in Hebrew were found among the Dead Sea Scrolls including 1Q6 (1QJudg; < 68 BCE) with extant verses 20–22. and 4Q49 (4QJudg^{a}; 50–25 BCE) with extant verses 2–6, 11–13.

Extant ancient manuscripts of a translation into Koine Greek known as the Septuagint (originally was made in the last few centuries BCE) include Codex Vaticanus (B; $\mathfrak{G}$^{B}; 4th century) and Codex Alexandrinus (A; $\mathfrak{G}$^{A}; 5th century). (Note: The whole book of Judges is missing from the extant Codex Sinaiticus.)

== Analysis ==
A linguistic study by Chisholm reveals that the central part in the Book of Judges (Judges 3:7–16:31) can be divided into two panels based on the six refrains that state that the Israelites did evil in Yahweh's eyes:

Panel One

A 3:7 ויעשו בני ישראל את הרע בעיני יהוה

And the children of Israel did evil in the sight of the LORD (KJV)
B 3:12 ויספו בני ישראל לעשות הרע בעיני יהוה

And the children of Israel did evil again in the sight of the LORD

B 4:1 ויספו בני ישראל לעשות הרע בעיני יהוה

And the children of Israel did evil again in the sight of the LORD

Panel Two

A 6:1 ויעשו בני ישראל הרע בעיני יהוה

And the children of Israel did evil in the sight of the LORD
B 10:6 ויספו בני ישראל לעשות הרע בעיני יהוה

And the children of Israel did evil again in the sight of the LORD

B 13:1 ויספו בני ישראל לעשות הרע בעיני יהוה

And the children of Israel did evil again in the sight of the LORD

Furthermore from the linguistic evidence, the verbs used to describe the Lord's response to Israel's sin have chiastic patterns and can be grouped to fit the division above:

Panel One

3:8 וימכרם, "and he sold them," from the root מָכַר, makar
3:12 ויחזק, "and he strengthened," from the root חָזַק, khazaq
4:2 וימכרם, "and he sold them," from the root מָכַר, makar

Panel Two

6:1 ויתנם, "and he gave them," from the root נָתַן, nathan
10:7 וימכרם, "and he sold them," from the root מָכַר, makar
13:1 ויתנם, "and he gave them," from the root נָתַן, nathan

Chapters 6 to 9 record the Gideon/Abimelech Cycle, which has two major parts:

1. the account of Gideon (6:1–8:32)
2. the account of Abimelech (8:33–9:57).

The Abimelech account is really a sequel of the Gideon account, resolving a number of complications originated in the Gideon narrative.

In this narrative, for the first time Israel's appeal to Yahweh was met with a stern rebuke rather than immediate deliverance, and the whole cycle addresses the issue of infidelity and religious deterioration.

The Gideon Narrative (6:1–8:32) consists of five sections along concentric lines — thematic parallels exist between the first (A) and fifth (A') sections as well as between the second (B) and fourth (B') sections, whereas the third section (C) stands alone — forming a symmetrical pattern as follows:

A. Prologue to Gideon (6:1–10)

B. God's plan of deliverance through the call of Gideon—the story of two altars (6:11–32)

B1. The first altar—call and commissioning of Gideon (6:11–24)
B2. The second altar—the charge to clean house (6:25–32)

C. Gideon's personal faith struggle (6:33–7:18)

a. The Spirit-endowed Gideon mobilizes 4 tribes against the Midianites, though lacking confidence in God's promise (6:33–35)

b. Gideon seeks a sign from God with two fleecings to confirm the promise that Yahweh will give Midian into his hand (6:36-40)

c. With the fearful Israelites having departed, God directs Gideon to go down to the water for the further reduction of his force (7:1–8)
c'. With fear still in Gideon himself, God directs Gideon to go down to the enemy camp to overhear the enemy (7:9–11)

b'. God provides a sign to Gideon with the dream of a Midianite and its interpretation to confirm the promise that Yahweh will give Midian into his hand (7:12–14)

a'. The worshiping Gideon mobilizes his force of 300 for a surprise attack against the Midianites, fully confident in God's promise (7:15–18)

B'. God's deliverance from the Midianites—the story of two battles (7:19–8:21)

B1'. The first battle (Cisjordan) (7:19–8:3)
B2'. The second battle (Transjordan) (8:4–21)

A'. Epilogue to Gideon (8:22–32)

== The call of Gideon (6:1–24) ==
The Gideon narrative follows the conventionalized pattern of the judges (cf. Judges 2:11–23; 3:12–30) with a description of the oppressed Israel (as an agriculturally based community; verses 3–5), because Israel had worshipped gods other than YHWH. God's response to the Israel's cry this time was different from the earlier accounts, as a prophet was sent to confront and indict the people of their unfaithfulness instead of directly sending a deliverer, implying that there would be a time when God's patience turned into judgment. Nonetheless, God who was the rescuer of the Exodus (cf. Exodus 20:2), did send a rescuer with the call to Gideon.

The account of Gideon's calling has strong similarities with that of Moses in Exodus 3 and Joshua in Joshua 1 as in the table below:

Comparison of the calling of Gideon, Moses and Joshua
	Gideon Judges 6	Moses Exodus 3	Joshua Joshua 1
Circumstances	Hiding from the enemy, working for his father who is clan head and priest of pagan shrine	Tending sheep for his father-in-law	After the death of Moses in camp at Abel-Sittim
Authorization	Have I not sent you?	and I will send you	Now rise up… have I not charged you?
Objection / Protest of inadequacy	"My family is the weakest… I am the least in the house of my father"	"Who am I … that I should bring the children of Israel out of Egypt"	(none)
Affirmation	for I will be with you	for I will be with you	… I will be with you
Sign	give me a sign	there [will be] a sign	(none)
Theophany	Fire theophany that induced fear (given at the end)	Fire theophany that induced fear (given unsolicited at the outset)	(none)
New material	(none)	(none)	Be strong and courageous (3x), be not afraid nor discouraged

The divine presence to Gideon, as also in the cases of Abraham, Jacob, Manoah's wife, involved an intermediary messenger who appeared at first like a normal human being. The commissioning of Gideon (cf. Moses: Exodus 3:10; Jeremiah: Jeremiah 1:4-5; and Saul: 1 Samuel 9:20) and his humble attempt to refuse (cf. Exodus 3:11; Jeremiah 1:6; 1 Samuel 9:21) was followed by a request for a sign as an assurance that the commission were truly from God (Genesis 15:8; Exodus 4:1; also Exodus 3:12-13). The fiery consummation of Gideon's offering as evidence of the divine message follows a pattern where God's power was revealed in the fire (cf. Genesis 15:17; Exodus 3:1–6; cf. Judges 13:20). Gideon's response in building of an altar placed Gideon in a line of Israelite ancestor heroes (cf. Genesis 29:17–18; 32:30).

=== Verse 1 ===
And the children of Israel did evil in the sight of the LORD: and the LORD delivered them into the hand of Midian seven years.

- "Midian": A semi-nomadic tribe from southern Transjordan area; fought with Israel in time of Moses (Numbers 25:16–18; 31:1–54).

== Gideon destroys Baal's altar (6:25–32) ==
Gideon's first task from God was to cut down the sacred pole or "asherah", a symbol of Baal, the Canaanite deity, and to replace the altar with an altar to YHWH, using the wood of the pole to provide the fire while offering a bull of his father's. When the people was angry at the action, Joash, Gideon's father, came to Gideon's support, by stating, 'Let Baal contend against him', which became a folk etymology for Gideon's new name, "Jerub-Baal" (meaning: "Let/May Baal contend/indict"), and this completes Gideon's transformation from 'farmer's son' to 'warrior hero'.

== The sign of the fleece (6:33–40) ==
Gideon was filled with the spirit of God (verse 34), a mark of charismatic leaders such as Samson, Jephthah, and Saul. but he still needed more confirmation for the battle and requested a sign of God's support. A fleece of wool as the material to show the sign draws from Israel's agricultural world which was the tradition throughout the book of Judges.

== See also ==
- Abieezer
- Amalekite
- Angel of the Lord
- Baal
- Children of Israel
- Egypt
- Ephah
- Flour
- Joash the Abiezrite
- Korban
- Land of Israel
- Matzo
- Midianite
- Ophrah
- Spirit of the Lord
- Tribe of Asher
- Tribe of Manasseh
- Tribe of Naphtali
- Tribe of Zebulun
- Valley of Jezreel
- Related Bible parts: Judges 4, Judges 7, Judges 8, Judges 9

== Sources ==
- Chisholm, Robert B. Jr. (2009). "The Chronology of the Book of Judges: A Linguistic Clue to Solving a Pesky Problem" (PDF). Journal of the Evangelical Theological Society. 52 (2): 247–55. Archived from the original (PDF) on 2022-11-08.
- Coogan, Michael David (2007). Coogan, Michael David; Brettler, Marc Zvi; Newsom, Carol Ann; Perkins, Pheme (eds.). The New Oxford Annotated Bible with the Apocryphal/Deuterocanonical Books: New Revised Standard Version, Issue 48 (Augmented 3rd ed.). Oxford University Press. ISBN 978-0-19-528881-0.
- Fitzmyer, Joseph A. (2008). A Guide to the Dead Sea Scrolls and Related Literature. Grand Rapids, MI: William B. Eerdmans Publishing Company. ISBN 978-0-8028-6241-9.
- Halley, Henry H. (1965). Halley's Bible Handbook: an abbreviated Bible commentary (24th (revised) ed.). Zondervan Publishing House. ISBN 0-310-25720-4.
- Hayes, Christine (2015). Introduction to the Bible. Yale University Press. ISBN 978-0-300-18827-1.
- Niditch, Susan (2007). "10. Judges". In Barton, John; Muddiman, John (eds.). The Oxford Bible Commentary (first (paperback) ed.). Oxford University Press. pp. 176–191. ISBN 978-0-19-927718-6.
- Ulrich, Eugene, ed. (2010). The Biblical Qumran Scrolls: Transcriptions and Textual Variants. Brill.
- Webb, Barry G. (2012). The Book of Judges. New International Commentary on the Old Testament. Eerdmans Publishing Company. ISBN 978-0-8028-2628-2.
- Würthwein, Ernst (1995). The Text of the Old Testament. Translated by Rhodes, Erroll F. Grand Rapids, MI: Wm. B. Eerdmans. ISBN 0-8028-0788-7.
- Younger, K. Lawson (2002). Judges and Ruth. The NIV Application Commentary. Zondervan. ISBN 978-0-310-20636-1.
