= Ofer (disambiguation) =

Ofer (Hebrew: עֹפֶר) is a Hebrew name meaning fawn. It is a variant of the name Ophrah. It may refer to:

== People ==
=== Surname ===
- Avraham Ofer (1922–1977), Israeli politician
- Eyal Ofer (born 1950), Monaco-based Israeli business magnate
- Gil Ofer (born 1976), Israeli Olympic judoka
- Idan Ofer (born 1955), London-based Israeli business magnate and philanthropist
- Or Offer (born 1983), Israeli entrepreneur and investor
- Sammy Ofer (1922–2011), Romanian-born, Monaco-based Israeli shipping magnate and philanthropist
- Yuli Ofer (1924–2011), Romanian-born Israeli business magnate
- Zvi Ofer (1932–1968), Israeli war hero

=== Given name ===
- Ofer Berkovich (born 1965), Israeli basketball coach
- Offer Eshed (1942–2007), Israeli basketball player
- Ofer Fleisher (born 1966), Israeli basketball player
- Ofer Nachshon (1966–2025), Israeli broadcaster and radio announcer
- Vince Offer (born Offer Shlomi; 1964), Israeli-American pitchman, filmmaker and actor
- Ofer Yaakobi (1961–2025), Israeli basketball player
- Ofer Zeitouni (born 1960), Israeli mathematician

== Other uses ==
- Ofer (moshav), a moshav in Israel
- Ofer Prison, an Israeli incarceration facility on the West Bank
- Ofer Brothers Group, an Israeli shipping company

== See also ==
- Ofir (disambiguation)
- Ophir (disambiguation)
