= Jotham's fable =

Fable in the Book of Judges

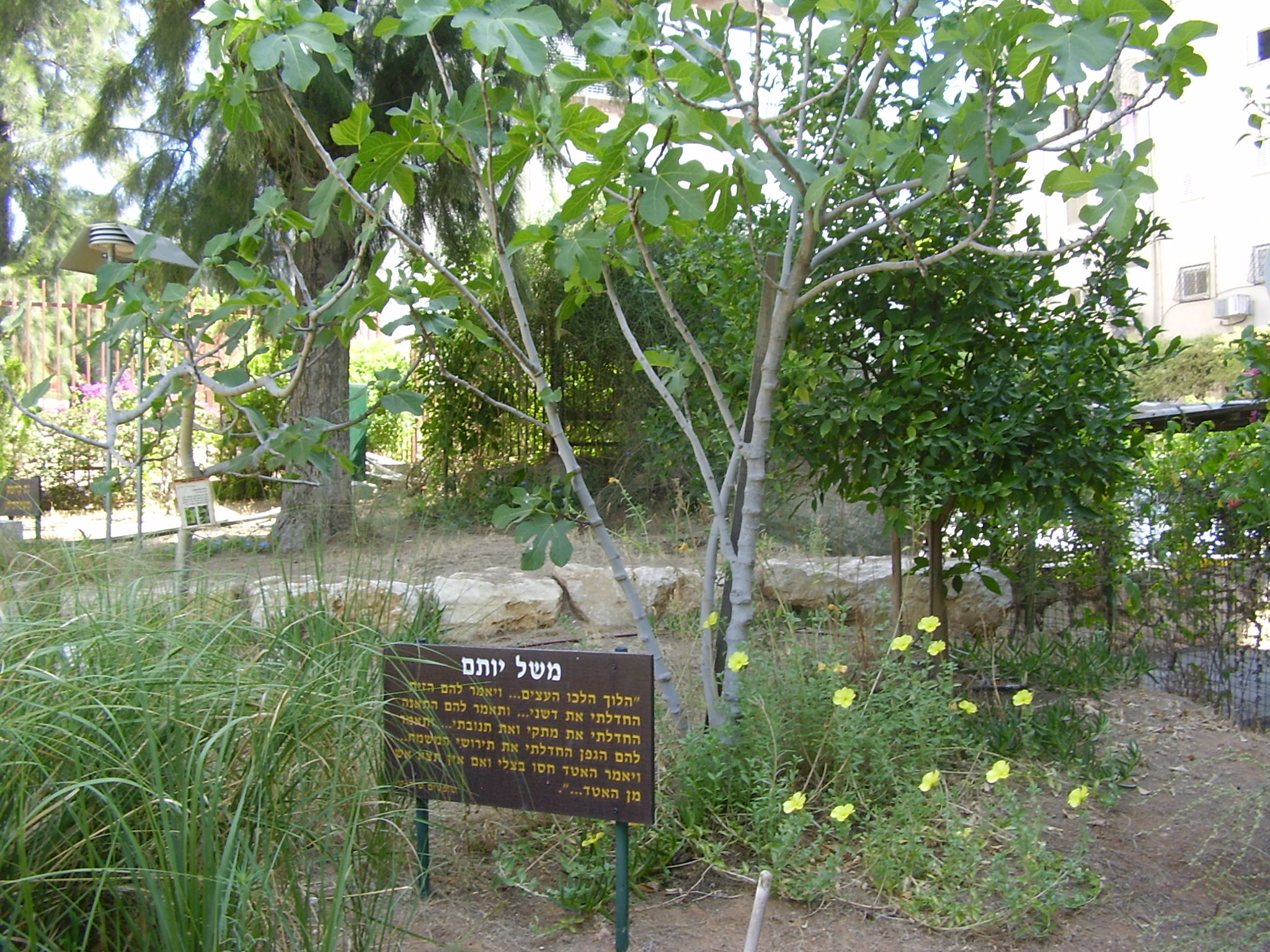
Jotham's fable display at the Rina Smilansky Garden, Rehovot

Jotham's fable (also Jotham's parable or the parable of the bramble; Hebrew: משל יותם, Mashal Yotam) is a fable in the Book of Judges (Judges 9:7–21), spoken by Jotham, the youngest son of Gideon. After Gideon's death, Jotham's half-brother Abimelech killed Gideon's other sons and was made king by the people of Shechem. Jotham, the only survivor, told the fable from Mount Gerizim as a protest against the new king.

In the fable the trees seek a king and offer the crown in turn to the olive, the fig and the vine, each of which declines; only the bramble (atad) accepts, inviting the trees into its shade and threatening fire if they refuse. Jotham turns that threat into a curse on Abimelech and the Shechemites, which the rest of the chapter fulfils as the two sides destroy each other. It is one of very few fables in the Hebrew Bible, and because it fits its application only loosely, several scholars think Jotham adapted an older fable. The plant meant by atad is usually taken to be a worthless thorny shrub, though some have identified it with the Christ's thorn jujube.

The fable has often been read as an attack on monarchy, notably by Martin Buber, but several later studies treat it as a curse on Abimelech and Shechem, or as a call for justice, rather than a verdict on kingship. Rabbinic commentators read the fruit trees as earlier judges or as Gideon's sons, and some modern writers have turned the fable against able people who decline public office. Josephus retells the episode in the Antiquities of the Jews, and gardens in Rehovot and at the Eretz Israel Museum commemorate it.

== Summary ==
In the fable, the trees set out to anoint a king. They first ask the olive, then the fig, then the vine, three plants of the Seven Species. Each refuses in almost the same words: it is already useful to others and will not give that up in order to "go to be promoted over the trees" (literally "to sway over the trees"). Finally the trees turn to the bramble (atad), which accepts. It tells them to take refuge in its shade, and warns that if they do not, fire will come out of the bramble and consume the cedars of Lebanon.

Jotham then applies the fable to his audience. If the people of Shechem acted in good faith toward Gideon's family when they crowned Abimelech, they should rejoice in him and he in them. If not, fire will come out of Abimelech and consume them, and fire will come out of them and consume Abimelech. Jotham then flees to Beer.

== Structure ==
Graham Ogden divides the fable, after a one-line introduction, into four sub-sections: the trees' invitations to the olive, the fig, the vine and the bramble. The first three candidates refuse in almost identical words, each refusal framed as a rhetorical question. The bramble's reply departs from the pattern, answering instead with a pair of conditional clauses, and Ogden takes this break as the rhetorical climax of the fable. The same conditions ("if in good faith ... but if not") structure Jotham's application in verses 16–20, where the bramble's threatened fire becomes a curse under which Abimelech and the Shechemites destroy one another.

Developing a 1973 study by Barnabas Lindars, who showed that this curse binds together the whole Abimelech narrative, Ogden reads the rest of the chapter as its fulfilment: Abimelech razes Shechem and burns alive those who had taken refuge in its stronghold, and is himself killed at Thebez by a millstone dropped by a woman. He concludes that the chapter's primary concern is not kingship as such but the mutual destruction of Abimelech and the men of Shechem, and takes the shift to mutual action in the application as evidence that Jotham almost certainly borrowed an existing fable and adapted it.

== Genre ==
The passage is usually classed as a fable, a story in which plants or animals act as people in order to teach a lesson. Roy A. Stewart counts it as one of only two undisputed fables in the Hebrew Bible, the other being the brief fable of the thistle and the cedar that King Jehoash sends to Amaziah in 2 Kings 14:9; he treats Ezekiel 17:3–10 as a disputed case and notes that the New Testament contains no fables at all. Stewart reads Jotham's fable not as religious or political teaching, and certainly not as a plea for republican government, but as an unmasking of the treachery of one bad king, and suggests that the olive, the vine and the fig may stand for Gideon, his son and his grandson, the three generations to whom rule was offered in Judges 8:22.

Because the fable fits its application only loosely, the International Standard Bible Encyclopedia suggests that an older fable may have been reused for the sake of a single point, a view Ogden also reaches on structural grounds. W. C. van Wyk examined the fable alongside the Sumerian and Akkadian disputation fables.

== Identification of the atad ==
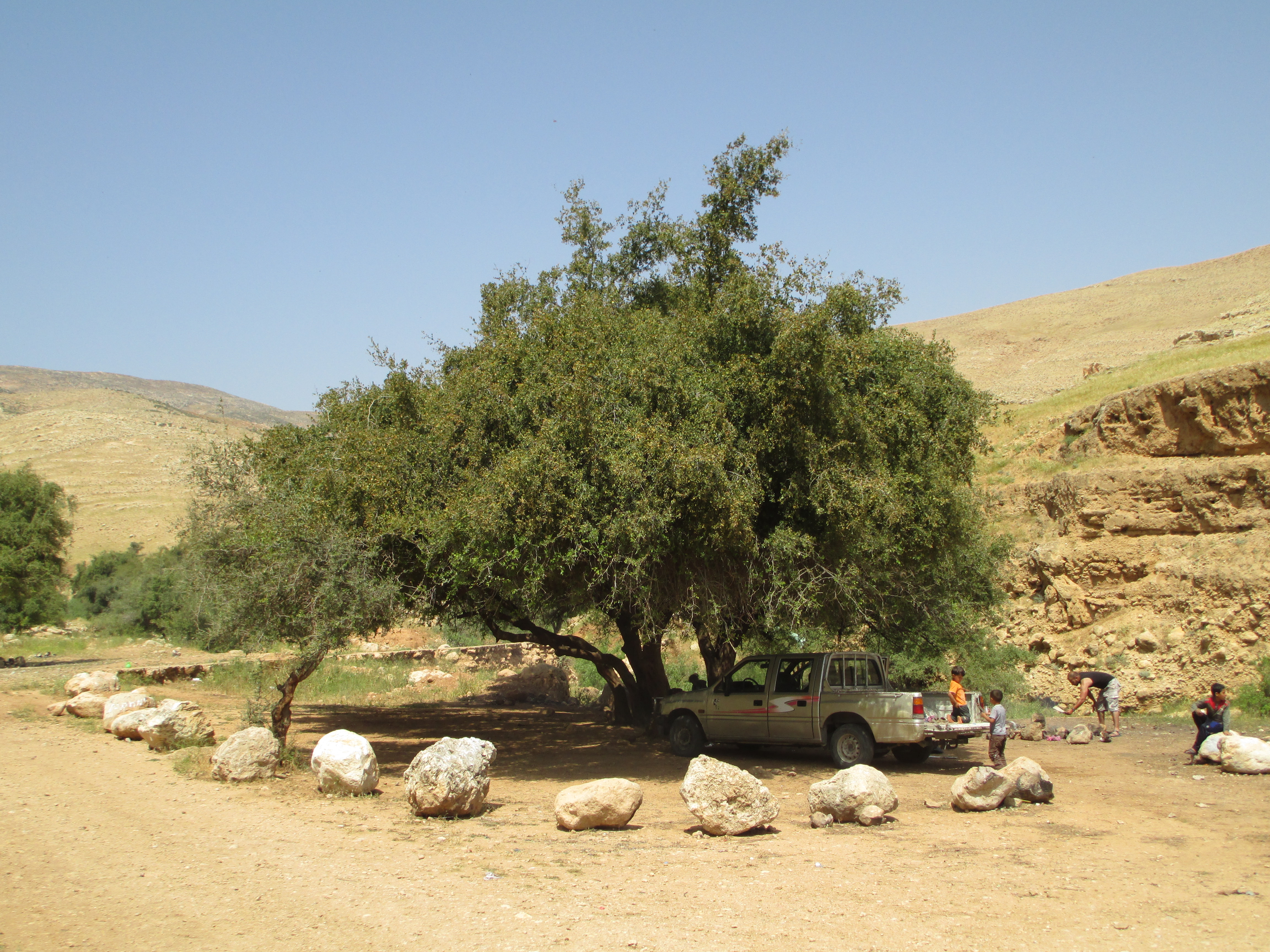
A Christ's thorn jujube in Nahal Petza'el. Ephraim and Hannah Hareuveni identified the atad of the fable with this tree, citing the broad shade it gives.

Jotham likens Abimelech to the atad. Most traditional commentators identify it as a barren, thorny, useless shrub. Yehuda Elitzur noted that the phrase "to sway over the trees" suggests barren trees that make noise in the wind but have nothing behind it.

Ishtori Haparchi and others identified the atad with the Christ's thorn jujube. Some later researchers dropped this identification in favour of a different shrub. The plant called atad in Modern Hebrew is Lycium europaeum, a low shrub with mostly edible fruit.

Ephraim and Hannah Hareuveni, the parents of Nogah Hareuveni, took up Ishtori Haparchi's identification of the atad with the Christ's thorn jujube, which Yehoseph Schwarz had also proposed without giving reasons, and argued for it. They rejected Lycium, which they called yakeshet, on the ground that a low shrub with branches arching to the ground could not offer the shade the bramble promises. On their reading Jotham chose not a contemptible shrub but a large and imposing tree, matching the strong first impression Abimelech had made, whose thorny branches and fruit of little market value revealed his true character on closer acquaintance.

The Hareuvenis identified the great atad at the threshing floor where Jacob was mourned for seven days (Genesis 50:10) as a broad tree of this kind, left standing near threshing floors to give shade to the workers, and explained the bramble's threat of fire by the local practice of burning the undergrowth beneath a jujube's lower branches.

== Interpretation ==
The first part of the story (Judges 9:1–4) in the Leningrad Codex (Cairo, 1008 CE).

The Encyclopaedia Judaica notes that the fable does not fit the story closely: the Shechemites did not offer the crown to anyone, and the murder of Gideon's sons is not mentioned in it. It suggests the fable may be an older etiology of how the useless bramble became a fire hazard. In Jotham's mouth, however, it becomes a warning against placing royal power in the wrong hands, a reading the entry attributes to Yehezkel Kaufmann. The same entry suggests the author may be punning on Jotham's name, since yatom means "orphan" in Hebrew.

Martin Buber called the fable the most forceful anti-monarchical text in world literature, but several later studies have argued against that reading. Ogden holds that the chapter is concerned not with kingship as such but with the mutual destruction of Abimelech and the men of Shechem. Jeremy Schipper reads the parable as reinforcing the judgment Jotham calls down on his hearers rather than as an attempt to change their conduct, and Daniel Diffey concludes in a 2013 dissertation that the fable functions as a curse on Abimelech and the lords of Shechem and is not anti-monarchical. Johannes Seidel argues from its nature imagery that the fable is concerned less with political systems than with justice, and reads it as a call to resistance.

The fable has also been read as a comment on government in general, and several modern writers turn it against the worthy candidates who refuse office. In a 1974 article in Maariv, Moshe Hazani argued that the real targets are the olive, the fig and the vine, since the other trees turned to the bramble only for lack of choice and the bramble did not push itself forward but was invited. The Israeli politician Tzipi Livni made a similar case in 2015, writing that the fruit trees' retreat into their comfort zone is what makes the bramble relevant. A 2026 column in the Kenyan newspaper The Standard used the fable to warn voters against electing unfit leaders. Rabbi Yigal Ariel reads the new king's first act as burning the cedars of Lebanon, the natural candidates for the throne, which pay for their excessive modesty in joining the other trees instead of offering themselves as rulers. Justin R. Hawkins compares the fable with Plato's argument in the Republic that the best rulers are reluctant ones.

== Reception ==
=== Josephus ===
Josephus retells the episode in the Antiquities of the Jews. He sets Jotham's speech at a public festival in Shechem, with Jotham calling down to the crowd from Mount Gerizim, which he describes as overhanging the city, and introduces the fable as a time when the trees had human speech. In his version the trees approach the fig first, then the vine and only then the olive, and he adds that the brier is a wood good for burning. Jotham's application is reduced to a reproach: the Shechemites had disregarded the benefits they received from Gideon and joined Abimelech in killing his brothers, and Abimelech was himself no better than a fire. Jotham then hides in the mountains for three years, and Josephus closes the episode by observing that the Shechemites' fate came about as Jotham had foretold.

== Rabbinic commentary ==
According to the rabbis and Rashi, the olive stands for the judge Othniel, the fig for Deborah and the vine for Gideon. According to Malbim, the fruit trees are Gideon's other sons murdered by Abimelech. Among them were wise men seeking the good, like olive shoots; rich men seeking the pleasant, like the fig; and statesmen seeking the useful, like the vine. None of them wanted the throne, and the common people went to the bramble, which had nothing good, pleasant or useful in it.

== Commemoration ==
The Rina Smilansky Garden of Biblical Plants in Rehovot has a corner dedicated to Jotham's fable. A Jotham's fable garden was also planted in the orchard of the Eretz Israel Museum in Tel Aviv, to support teaching the Bible as a living book in the spirit of the educator Baruch Ben-Yehuda.

== See also ==
- Parables of Jesus
