= Karkor =

Karkor - foundation, a place in the open desert wastes on the east of Jordan (Judges 8:10), not far beyond Succoth and Penuel, to the south. Here Gideon overtook and routed a fugitive band of Midianites under Zebah and Zalmunna, whom he took captive.
