= Ofir =

Ofir is an alternate spelling of the Jewish name Ophir. The name may refer to:

- Ofir Akunis (born 1973), Israeli politician
- Ofir Amram (born 1986), Israeli footballer
- Ofir Ben Shitrit (born 1995), Israeli singer
- Ofir Davidzada (born 1991), Israeli footballer
- Ofir Drori (born 1976), Israeli writer
- Ofir Gendelman (born 1971), Israeli diplomat
- Ofir Raul Graizer (born 1981), Israeli film maker
- Ofir Haim (born 1975), Israeli footballer
- Ofir Haivry (born 1964), Israeli political philosopher and historian
- Ofir Katz (born 1980), Israeli politician
- Ofir Kopel (born 1975), Israeli footballer
- Ofir Kriaf (born 1991), Israeli footballer
- Ofir Lobel, (born 1976), Israeli actor and musician
- Ofir Marciano (born 1989), Israeli footballer
- Ofir Mizrahi (born 1993), Israeli footballer
- Ofir Netzer (born 1996), Israeli gymnast
- Ofir Shaham (born 2004), Israeli team world champion rhythmic gymnast
- Ofir Shwartz (born 1979), Israeli musician
- Ofir Sofer (born 1975), Israeli politician

== See also ==
- Ofer (disambiguation)
- Ophir (disambiguation)
