= Jotham (son of Gideon) =

Biblical figure

Jotham or Yotam (/ˈdʒoʊθəm/; Hebrew: יוֹתָם, "Yahweh is perfect" or "Yahweh is complete"; Greek: Ιωαθαμ; Latin: Joatham) was the youngest of Gideon's seventy sons. He escaped when the rest were put to death by the order of his half-brother Abimelech (Judges 9:5).

== Protest against the proclamation of Abimelech as the new king ==
When "the citizens of Shechem and the whole house of Millo" were gathered together "by the plain of the pillar" (i.e., the stone set up by Joshua, 24:26; compare Genesis 35:4) "that was in Shechem, to make Abimelech king", from one of the heights of Mount Gerizim he protested against their doing so in the earliest parable in the Bible, that of the bramble-king. This parable is often repeated at Tu BiShvat and is famous in Israel. His words then spoken were prophetic. There came a recoil in the feelings of the people toward Abimelech, and then a terrible revenge, in which many were slain and the city of Shechem was destroyed by Abimelech (Judges 9:45). Having delivered his warning, Jotham fled to Beer from the vengeance of Abimelech (Judges 9:7–21).
