= Baal Berith =

God(s) worshipped in ancient Canaan

Baʿal Berith (Hebrew: בעל ברית, lit. 'Baʿal of the Covenant') and El Berith (Hebrew: אל ברית, lit. 'God of the Covenant') are titles of a god or gods worshiped in Shechem, in ancient Canaan, according to the Bible.

The term for "covenant" (Hebrew: ברית, romanized: bərīt) appears also in Ugaritic texts (second millennium BCE) as brt (𐎁𐎗𐎚), in connection with Baʿal, and perhaps as Beruth in Sanchuniathon's work.

== In the Bible ==
Judges is the only Biblical book that mentions Baʿal Berith and El Berith in Judges 8 and 9. It is not clear whether they are actually one god, nor whether they are separate forms of Baʿal and El. Scholars suppose that he or they may have been worshipped for connections to fertility and vegetation, based on Judges 9:27. Also unclear is what covenant or covenants are referred to by the name Berith.

According to Yehezkel Kaufmann, "Baal-berith and El-berith of Judges 9:4,46 is presumably YHWH", as "ba'al was an epithet of YHWH in earlier times".

Elsewhere, some of the Shechemites are called "men of Hamor" in Judges 9:28. This is compared to "sons of Hamor", which in the ancient Middle East referred to people who had entered into a covenant sealed by the sacrifice of a hamor, an ass. "Children of Hamor" or "sons of Hamor" itself appears in the Book of Genesis and Joshua 24:32. in both of which, as in Judges, Hamor is called the father of Shechem. Genesis 33:18 features a man named Hamor who ruled in the area of Shechem and had a son named "Shechem".

== Proposed relation to Berouth ==
In his euhemeristic account of the Phoenician deities, Sanchuniathon says that a certain Elioun, called also "the Most High", and a female named Berouth or Beruth dwelt in the neighbourhood of Byblos, on the coast of present-day Lebanon. They had two children—a male called Epigeius/Autochthon/Sky and a daughter called Earth. Because of the latter pair's beauty, the sky and the earth, respectively, were named after them. According to Sanchuniathon it is from Sky and Earth that El and various other deities are born, though ancient texts refer to El as creator of heaven and earth. A relationship with Hebrew bərīt ("covenant") or with the city name Beirut have both been suggested for Beruth. However, Robert R. Stieglitz showed how Berouth is best connected to bʾrôt, a name for the primordial sea, tehom.

== Rabbinic literature ==
Rabbinic tradition equates Baʿal Berith with Beelzebub, "the lord of flies," the god of Philistine Ekron (2 Kings 1:2). He was worshipped in the shape of a fly; and Jewish tradition states that so addicted were the Jews to his cult that they would carry an image of him in their pockets, producing it, and kissing it from time to time. Baʿal Zebub was called Baʿal Berith because such Jews might be said to make a covenant of devotion with the idol, being unwilling to part with it for a single moment. According to another conception, Baʿal Berith was an obscene article of idolatrous worship, possibly a simulacrum priapi. This is evidently based on the later use of the word "berit" to refer to circumcision.

== Christianity ==
According to the Admirable History written by Sébastien Michaëlis in 1612, Baʿal Berith once possessed a nun in Aix-en-Provence. In the process of the exorcism, Baʿal Berith volunteered not only his own name and the names of all the other demons possessing her, but the names of the saints who would be most effective in opposing them.

== See also ==
- Other uses of "berith"
