= Adam and Eve/Gideon and the Fleece =

Painting by Maarten van Heemskerck

Adam and Eve Gideon and the Fleece
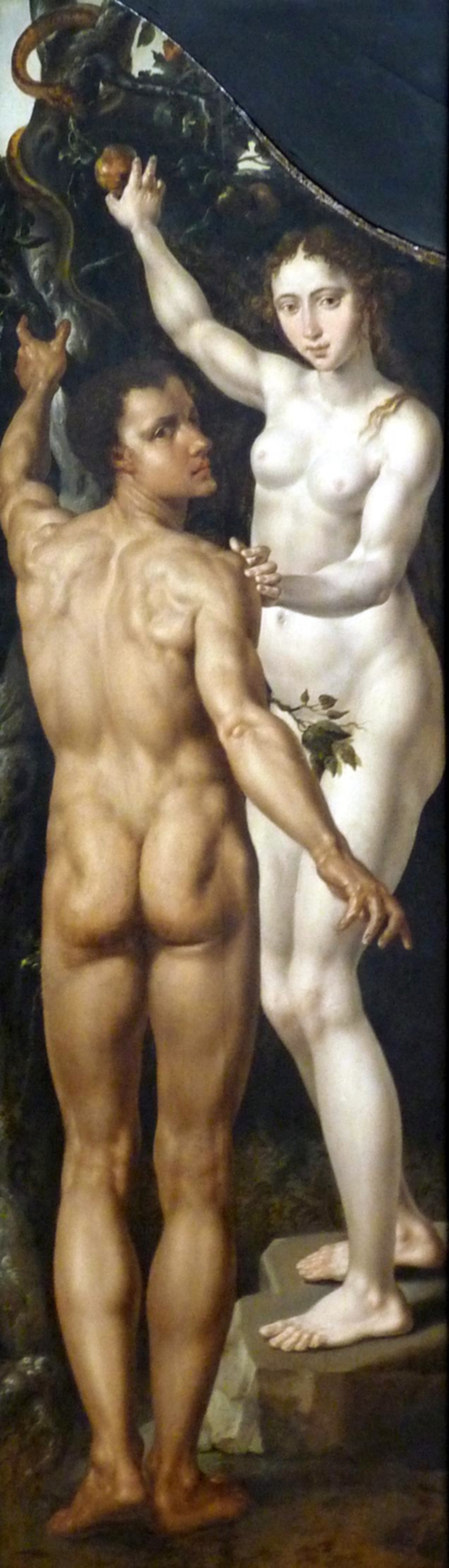
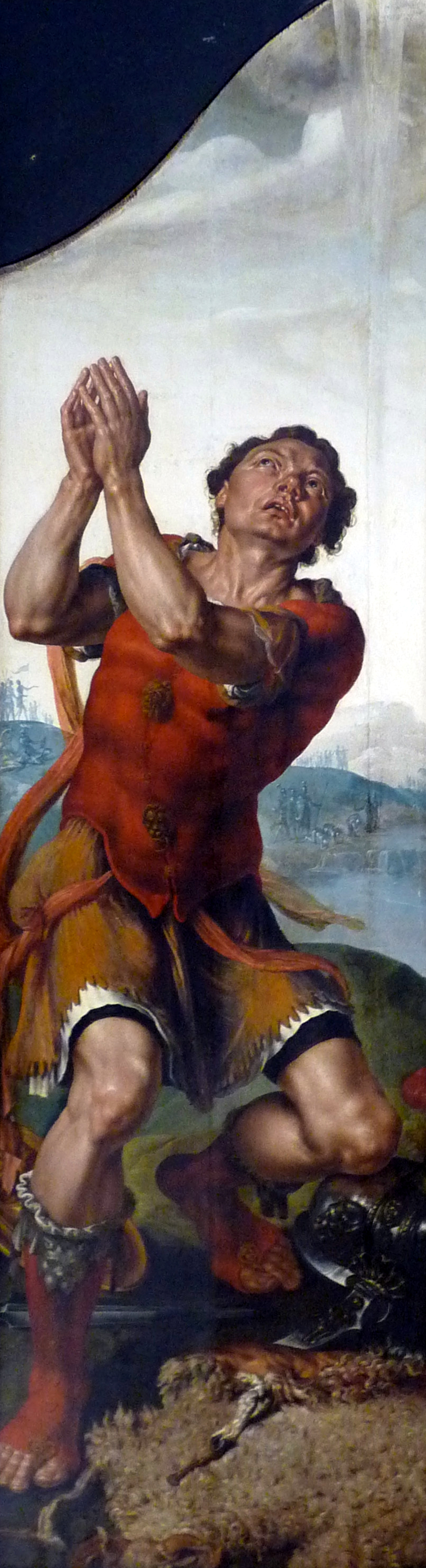
- Adam and Eve Gideon and the Fleece
- Artist: Maarten van Heemskerck
- Year: 1550
- Medium: oil painting on panel
- Movement: Mannerism; Northern Renaissance
- Subject: Adam and Eve; Gideon
- Dimensions: 177.5 cm × 50 cm (69.9 in × 20 in)
- Location: Musée des Beaux-Arts, Strasbourg
- Accession: 1948

Adam and Eve and Gideon and the Fleece are two life-sized Old Testament paintings by the Low Countries Dutch Renaissance painter Maarten (or Maerten) van Heemskerck. They are on display in the Musée des Beaux-Arts of Strasbourg, France. Their inventory numbers are 1747b (Adam and Eve) and 1747a (Gideon).

The Strasbourg panels were bought from a private Parisian collection in 1948, their previous history is as yet unknown. They have however been identified as the obverse of two panels from 1550, now kept in the Museum Boijmans Van Beuningen, Rotterdam, and thus as the wings of a triptych, of which the middle panel is lost. It is thought to have shown a Nativity of Jesus.

The Gideon panel depicts the episode from the Book of Judges 6:36-40 in which Gideon asks God for two successive miracles regarding a fleece, first that it should be wet with dew in the morning while everything around is dry, and then that it should be dry in the morning while everything around is wet with dew. Theologically, the fleece is meant to allude to the virginity of Mary.

The Adam and Eve panel depicts Eve receiving the forbidden fruit from the Serpent and inviting Adam to share it with her. It is thus both chronologically and theologically the starting point of the story being told in the now dismembered triptych: Original Sin – prefiguration of the Virgin Birth (Gideon's fleece) – Visitation – Nativity.

Adam's muscular build and Gideon's dramatic posture are reminiscent of works by Michelangelo and his imitators that Heemskerck had seen in Rome.

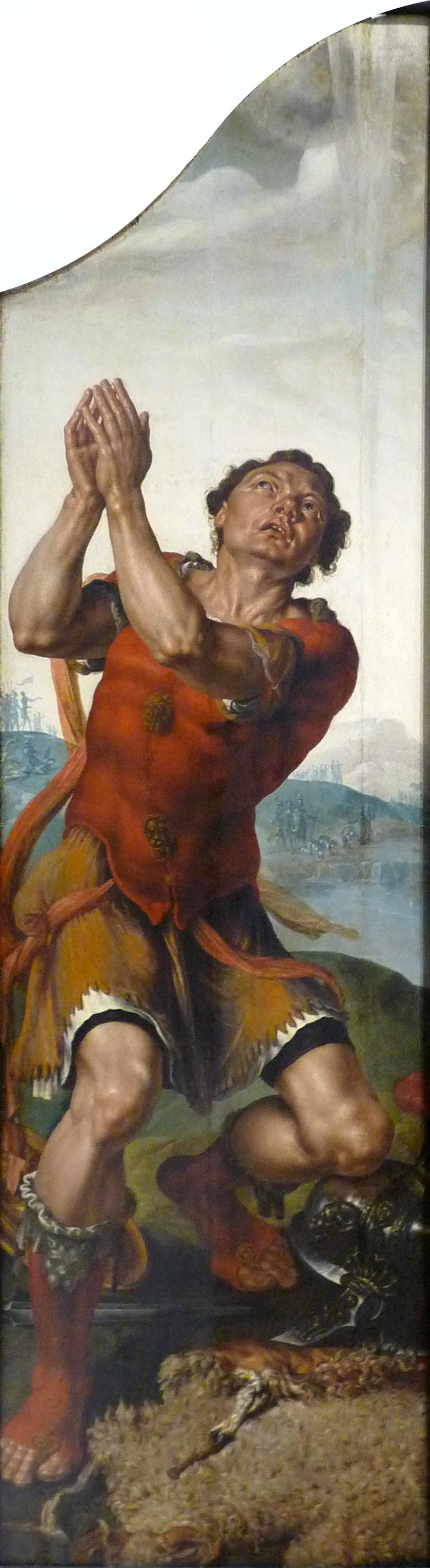
Inverted view...

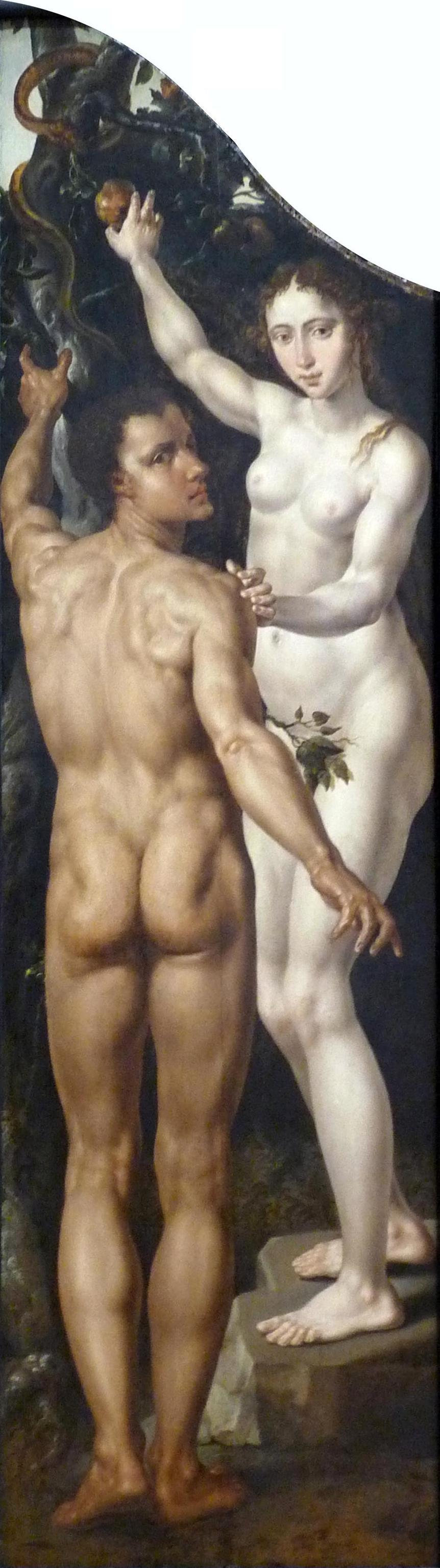
...of the panels.

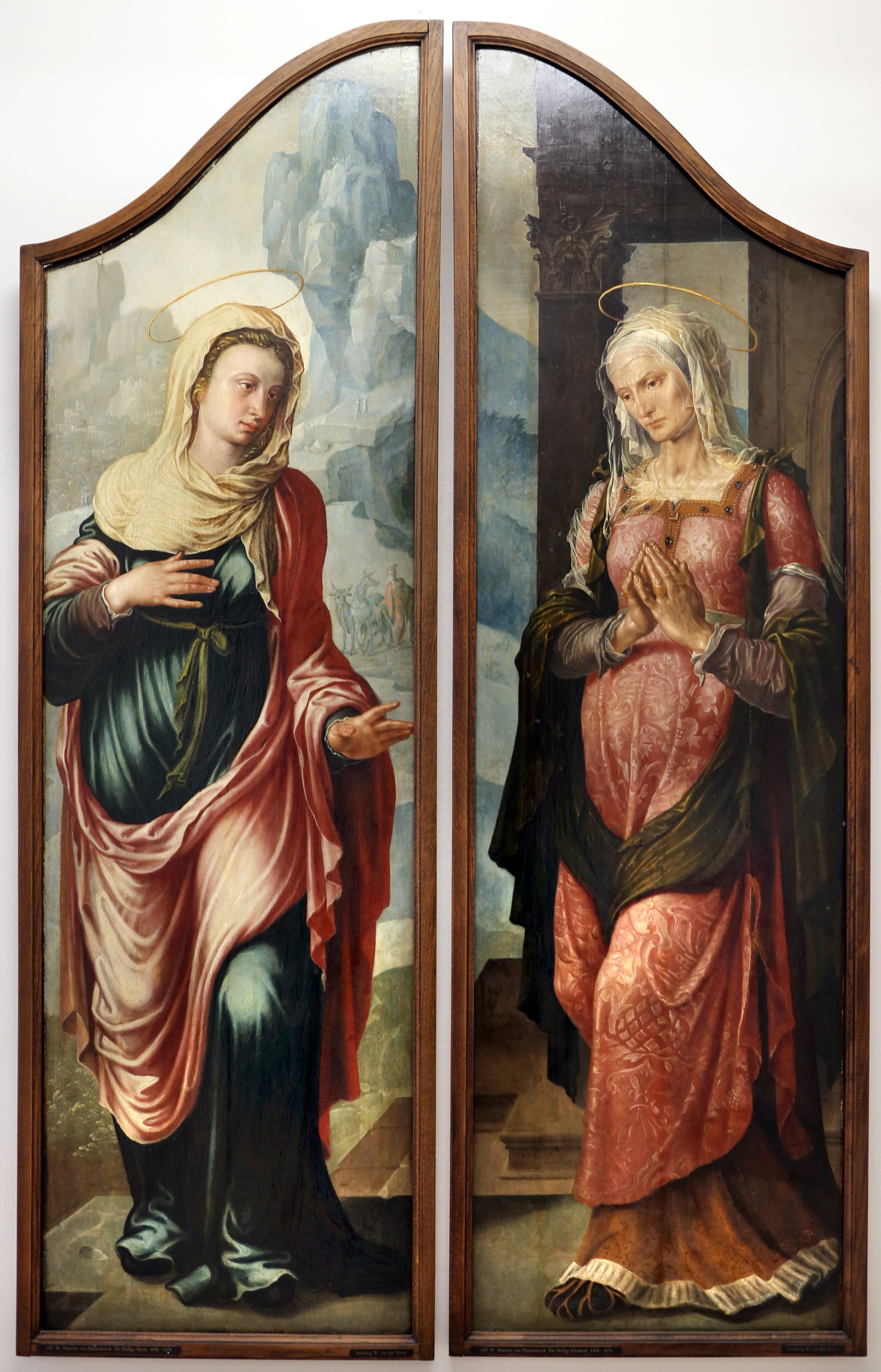
The reverse panels (Rotterdam): The Visitation
