= Jether =

Name list

Jether (Hebrew: יֶ֣תֶר) is a name mentioned several times in the Hebrew Bible. It means "surplus" or "excellence".

1. The father-in-law of Moses (Exodus 4:18 marg.), called elsewhere Jethro or Jothor.
2. The oldest of Gideon's seventy sons, who was asked to kill the Midianite kings Zebah and Zalmunna who had been captured by Gideon. Being still young at the time, he did not have the confidence to carry out his father's request, so Zebah and Zalmunna called on Gideon to perform the deed himself (Judges 8:20–21). The Cambridge Bible for Schools and Colleges suggests that the task might have been an opportunity for Gideon "to bestow an honour upon his son" or to "humiliate these famous warriors" and notes William Robertson Smith's comparison with Exodus 24:5, where young men of the children of Israel were to make the sacrificial offerings.
3. The father of Amasa, David's general (1 Kings 2:5, 32); called Ithra (2 Sam. 17:25).
4. 1 Chr. 7:38.
5. 1 Chr. 2:32; one of Judah's posterity.
6. 1 Chr. 4:17.
