= Benedikt Gletting =

Swiss poet

Benedikt Gletting was a 16th-century Swiss poet. Little is known about his life, but his ballads were popular in early modern Switzerland and were repeatedly edited during the 17th century. A native of Bütschwil, he lived in Bern from at least 1540, and later in various places in the Bernese Oberland before again taking residence in Berne in 1561. He has composed a number of songs praising individual sites in the Bernese Oberland, including Frutigen, Mülenen, Aeschi and Reichenbach, as well as songs about Bern and Murten. He is also the author of religious ballads, including a long song about the biblical Joseph. A song beginning O usserwölte Eydgnoschafft called for unity at a time of confessional division in the wake of the Swiss Reformation. This song was edited by Hanns In der Gand in a shortened version (shortened from 26 to 4 verses) in 1934 under the title Vermahnlied an die Eidgenossenschaft ("song of warning for the Confederacy") and in this form was reprinted in various Swiss songbooks during the 20th century.

== Editions ==
- Der geystlich Joseph 1685
- Zwey geystliche newe Lieder, Marburg 1565, Basel 1592
- Das geystlich Vogel gsang, Berne 1574.
- ed. Theodor Odinga 1891, Benedikt Gletting: Ein Berner Volksdichter des 16. Jh.
