= Ophir (disambiguation) =

Ophir (sometimes spelled Ofir) is a region mentioned in the Bible that was famous for its wealth. It may also refer to:

== People ==
Ophir is used as a first and last name among people of Jewish heritage and others. One of the common Hebrew translations for Goldman and Goldstein:

- Ophir, one of the sons of Joktan (Genesis 10:29)
- Ophir Pines-Paz, the interior minister of Israel, a Knesset member and one of the prominent members of the Israeli Labor Party
- Ofir Netzer, Israeli artistic gymnast
- Ophira Eisenberg, Canadian comedian and writer
- Adi Ophir, an Israeli philosopher at Tel Aviv University
- Shaike Ophir was an Israeli film actor, mime and comedian, considered one of the most important entertainers in Israel from the 1950s up to the 1980s

== Places ==
=== United States ===
- Ophir, Alaska, an abandoned gold-rush town
- Ophir, California, a town
- Ophir, Colorado, a town
- Ophir, Kentucky, a town
- Ophir, Oregon, an unincorporated community
- Ophir, Utah, a town
- Mount Ophir, California, a ghost town

=== Other places ===
- Colonia Ofir, a Russian settlement in Uruguay
- Mount Ophir, a mountain in Johor, Malaysia
- Ophir, New South Wales, a locality where gold was first discovered in Australia in 1851
- Ophir, New Zealand, a small town in Central Otago
- Ophir, Ontario, a farming community in Canada
- Ophir Chasma, a canyon on the planet Mars

== Ships ==
- RMS Ophir, a British ocean liner built in 1891 and scrapped in 1922
- SS Ophir, a Dutch steamship built in 1904 that became USS Ophir in 1918

== Other uses ==
- Ophir Award, the most important Israeli film award named after Shaike Ophir
- Ophir Energy, oil and gas exploration company
- Ophir (Conan), a nation in the fictional world of Conan the Barbarian

== See also ==
- Orphir, Orkney, Scotland
