= Abiezrite =

Descendants of Abiezer, son of Gilead

According to the Hebrew Bible, the Abiezrites were one of the ten clans identified as belonging to the tribe of Manasseh. The Abiezrites traced their lineage through Abiezer, the son of Gilead. Joash and Gideon were members of this clan: Gideon describes the Abiezrites, as "the weakest in [the tribe of] Manasseh". The Samaria Ostraca, written between 850 and 750 BCE, record two villages associated with the Abiezrites. Scholars have identified that the clan lived in the area south and southwest of Shechem (near present-day Nablus).
