= Abiezer =

Biblical figures

Abiezer or Abie-ezer or Abieezer, meaning "My father is help" is the name of three Biblical characters:

- The prince of the tribe of Dan at the time of the Exodus.
- The second of the three sons of Hammoleketh, the sister of Gilead. Also called Jeezer, He was the grandson of Manasseh and from his family Gideon sprang. In Judges, Gideon describes his clan, the Abiezrites, as "the weakest in [the tribe of] Manasseh".
- One of King David's thirty warriors a Benjamite from Anathoth.
