= Oreb and Zeeb =

Princes mentioned in the Hebrew Bible

Oreb (Hebrew: עֹרֵב, Orev) and Zeeb (Hebrew: זְאֵב, Z'ev) were two Midianite princes mentioned in the Hebrew Bible. Oreb (/ˈɔːrɛb/) is a Hebrew Old Testament name, meaning raven while Zeeb means wolf. By the time of the Judges, Oreb and Zeeb were raiding Israel with the use of swift camels, until they were decisively defeated by Gideon (Judges 7:20–25). Many of the Midianites perished along with him (Psalm 83:12; Isaiah 10:26). These later references reflect the importance ascribed to the victories as symbols of God's power mediated through his chosen people.

The place where Gideon slew Oreb after the defeat of the Midianites was called the Rock of Oreb. It was probably the place now called Orbo, on the east of Jordan, near Bethshean. Zeeb was killed at "the wine press of Zeeb". The historicity of the names is in doubt, Coggins postulates the names of geographical features were attached to the leaders in retrospect.
