= Gideon =

Character in the biblical Book of Judges

- גִּדְעוֹן
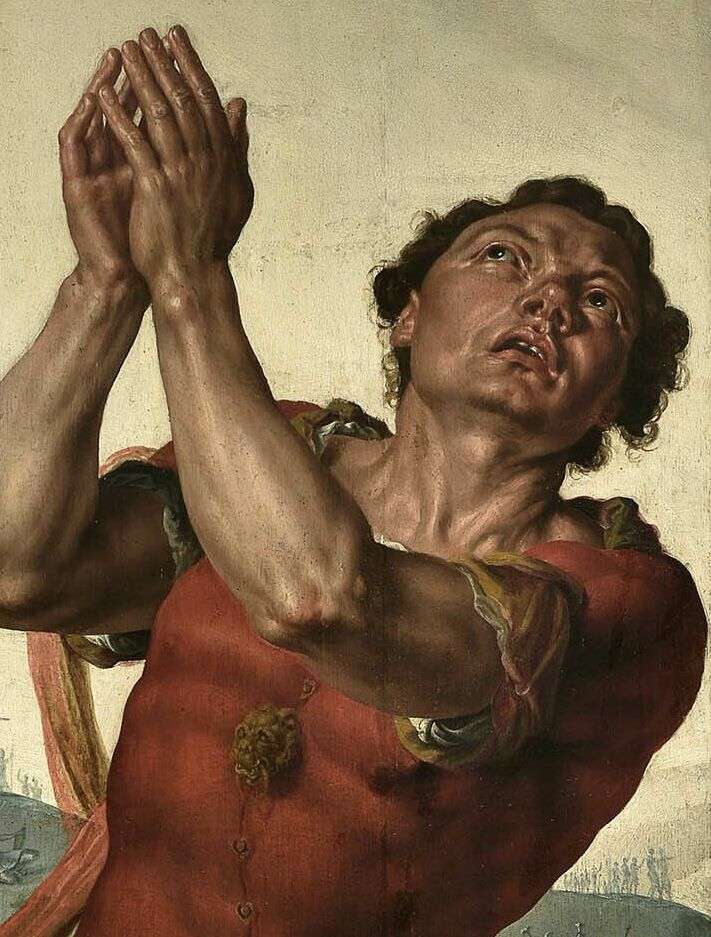
- Gideon and the Fleece (1550) by Maarten van Heemskerck
- Predecessor: Deborah
- Successor: Abimelech
- Father: Joash

Gideon (/ˈɡɪdiən/; Biblical Hebrew: גִּדְעוֹן, romanized: Giḏəʿón) also named Jerubbaal (יְרֻבַּעַל Yərubbaʿál) and Jerubbesheth (|יְרֻבֶּשֶׁת Yərubbéšeṯ) was an Israelite shopeṭ ("judge"), military leader, and prophet whose calling and victory over the Midianites is described in Judges 6–8 in the Hebrew Bible.

Gideon was the son of Joash, from the Abiezrite clan in the tribe of Manasseh, and lived in Ephra (Ophrah). As a leader of the Israelites, he won a decisive victory over a Midianite army despite a vast numerical disadvantage, leading a troop of 300 men.

== Names ==
The nineteenth-century Strong's Concordance derives the name "Jerubbaal" from "Baal will contend", in accordance with the folk etymology, given in Judges 6:32. (Note: As to "Baal will contend" being an example of folk etymology, see Muddiman 2007, p. 182) According to biblical scholar Lester Grabbe (1967), "[Judges] 6.32 gives a nonsensical etymology of his name; it means something like 'Let Baal be great.'"

Likewise, where Strong gave the meaning "hewer" to the name Gideon, Biblical scholar Simon John DeVries (1975) suggests the etymology "driver".

The "besheth" part of the name "Jerubbesheth" (2 Samuel 11:21) means "shame". This a pious editorialization of "Baal", as is also found in the names of Saul's son Ish-bosheth and grandson Mephibosheth.

== Biblical narrative ==
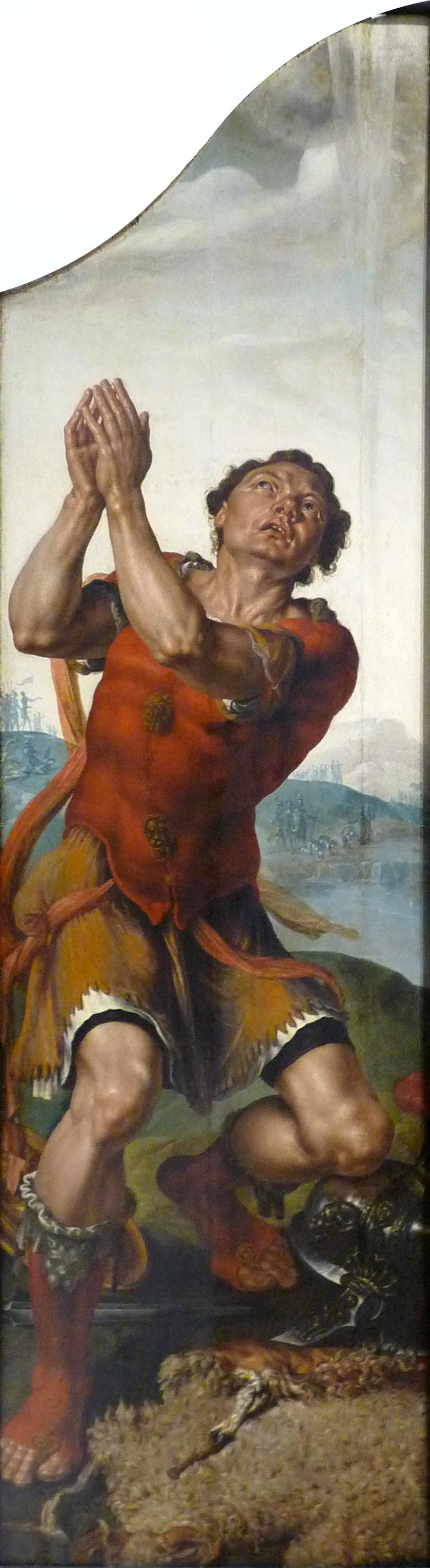
Gideon thanking God for the Miracle of the Dew, painting by Maarten van Heemskerck (Musée des Beaux-Arts de Strasbourg)

As is the pattern throughout the Book of Judges, the Israelites again turned away from Yahweh after 40 years of peace brought by Deborah's victory over Canaan; as punishment, the Midianites, Amalekites and Kedemites harried Israel for seven years.

=== Calling ===
God chose Gideon, a young man from the tribe of Manasseh, to free the people of Israel and to condemn their idolatry. The Angel of the Lord, or "the Lord's angelic messenger" came "in the character ... of a traveller who sat down in the shade [of the terebinth tree] to enjoy a little refreshment and repose" and entered into conversation with Gideon. The narrative has echoes of the meeting between Abraham and the visitors who came to him at Mamre and promised Abraham and Sarah, in their old age, that they would have a son according to Genesis 18. The angel greeted Gideon: "The Lord is with you, you mighty man of valor!" according to Judges 6:12.

Gideon requested proof of God's will by six or seven miracles: firstly, a sign from the angel, in which the angel appeared to Gideon and caused fire to shoot up out of a rock in verses 11–22, and then two signs involving a fleece, performed on consecutive nights and the exact opposite of each other. Gideon woke up to his fleece covered in dew, but the surrounding ground was dry; the next morning, his fleece was dry, but the surrounding ground was covered in dew according to verses 36–40.

On God's instruction, Gideon destroyed the town's altar to Baal and the symbol of the goddess Asherah beside it, receiving the byname of Jerubbaal according to Judges 6:32: "That day they named him Jerubbaal, meaning 'Let Baal contend with him,' since he tore down his altar."

=== Gathering an army ===
Gideon then sent out messengers to gather men from the tribes of Asher, Zebulun, and Naphtali, as well as his own tribe of Manasseh, in order to meet an armed force of Midian and Amalek that had crossed the Jordan River. Gideon's force encamped at En Harod, while the Midianites camped near the "Hill of Moreh" in Judges 7, verse 1.

God informed Gideon that the men he had gathered were too many: with so many men, the Israelites might claim the victory as their own rather than crediting God. God first instructed Gideon to send home those men who were afraid. Gideon invited any man who wanted to leave to do so; 22,000 men returned home, and 10,000 remained. God then told Gideon that this number was still too many and instructed Gideon to bring the men to the water to drink. God commanded Gideon to separate those who had lapped water to drink like dogs from those who drank on their knees. Only the 300 men who had lapped the water from their hands, and not those who had drunk directly while kneeling, were chosen to accompany Gideon.

=== Night attack ===
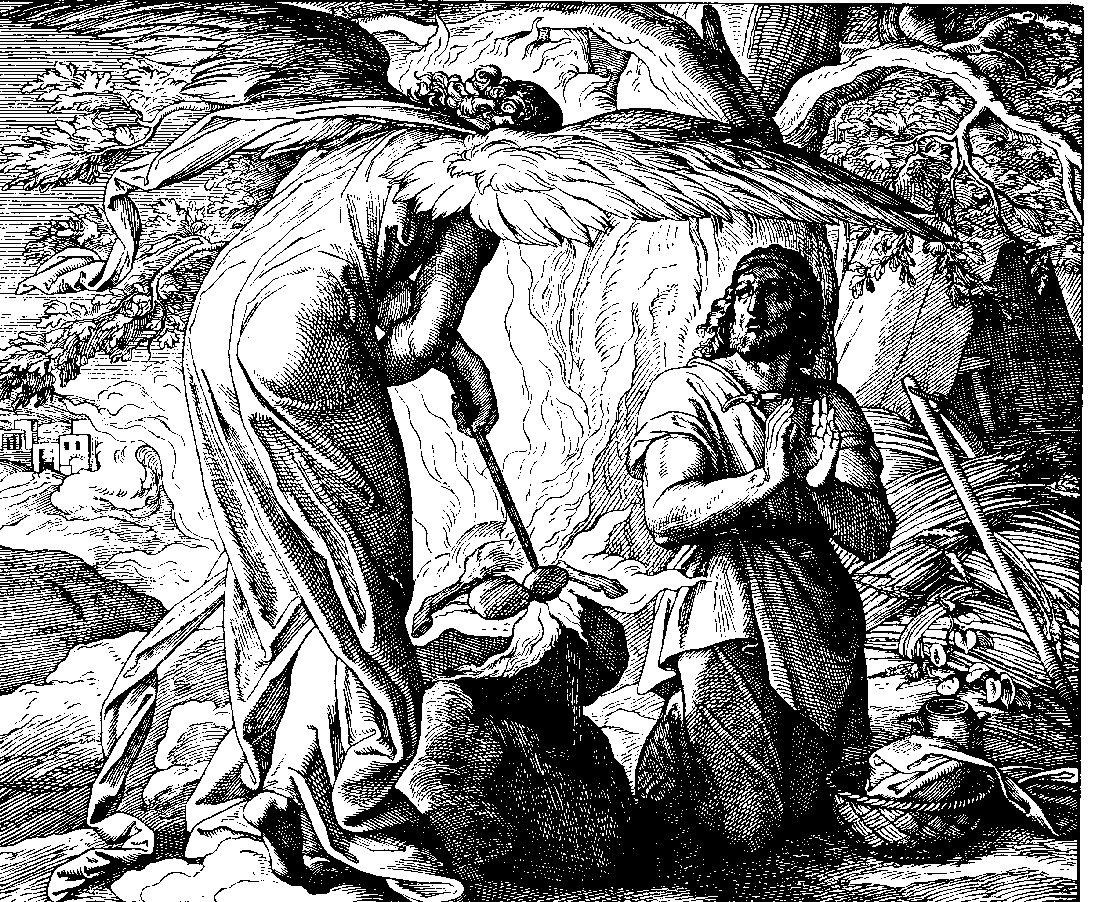
Gideon's Call, 1860 woodcut by Julius Schnorr von Karolsfeld

During the night, God instructed Gideon to approach the Midianite camp. There, Gideon overheard a Midianite man tell a friend of a dream in which "a loaf of barley bread tumbled into the camp of Midian", causing their tent or camp to collapse. This was interpreted as meaning that God had given the Midianites over to Gideon. Gideon returned to the Israelite camp and gave each of his men a shofar and a clay jar with a torch hidden inside. Divided into three companies, Gideon and his 300 men marched on the enemy camp. He instructed them to blow the trumpet, give a battle cry and light torches, simulating an attack by a large force. As they did so, the Midianite army fled.

Gideon sent messengers ahead into Israel calling for the Ephraimites to pursue the retreating Midianites and two of their leaders, Oreb and Zeeb. Gideon and the three hundred pursued Zebah and Zalmunna, the two Midianite kings. When he had asked for provisions in his pursuit, the men of Succoth and Peniel refused and taunted Gideon. After capturing the two kings, Gideon punished the men of Succoth, and pulled down the tower of Peniel killing all the men there. Gideon invited his eldest son, Jether, to slay Zebah and Zalmunna, but being still young at the time, he did not have the confidence to carry out his father's request, so Zebah and Zalmunna called on Gideon to perform the deed himself. Gideon then killed Zebah and Zalmunna as justice for the death of his brothers (Judges 8:19–21). The place where Gideon slew Oreb after the defeat of the Midianites was called the Rock of Oreb. It was probably the place now called Orbo, on the east of Jordan, near Bethshean. Zeeb was killed at "the wine press of Zeeb".

=== Subsequent events ===
The Israelites invited Gideon to become their king and to found a dynasty, but he refused, telling them that only God was their ruler.

Gideon went on to make an ephod out of the gold won in battle, as a sign of what God had done for them. Gideon had 70 sons from the many women he took as wives. He also had a Shechemite concubine who bore him a son whom he named Abimelech, which means "my father is king".

There was peace in Israel for 40 years during the life of Gideon. As soon as Gideon died of old age, the Israelites again turned to worship the false god Baal Berith and ignored the family of Gideon (Judges 8:33). Gideon was succeeded for a brief time as ruler of Shechem by his son Abimelech.

== Rabbinic commentary ==
According to Louis Ginzberg's Midrash anthology The Legends of the Jews: "Elated by the victory over Sisera, Israel sang a hymn of praise, the song of Deborah, and God, to reward them for their pious sentiments, pardoned the transgression of the people. But they soon slipped back into the old ways, and the old troubles harassed them. Their back-sliding was due to the witchcraft of a Midianite priest named Aud. He made the sun shine at midnight, and so convinced the Israelites that the idols of Midian were mightier than God, and God chastised them by delivering them into the hands of the Midianites. They worshipped their own images reflected in the water, and they were stricken with dire poverty. They could not bring so much as a meal offering, the offering of the poor. On the eve of one Passover, Gideon uttered the complaint: "Where are all the wondrous works which God did for our fathers in this night, when he slew the first-born of the Egyptians, and Israel went forth from slavery with joyous hearts?" God appeared unto him, and said: "Thou who art courageous enough to champion Israel, thou art worthy that Israel should be saved for thy sake."

To explain why the men who brought water to their mouths with their hands were chosen to fight, while the others who lapped the water directly or bowed down were not chosen, some writers explain that lapping directly is disgraceful and similar to a dog, while bowing down resembles idolatry. Those who were faithful were allowed to depart.

According to The Legends of the Jews: "...In the high priest's breastplate, Joseph was represented among the twelve tribes by Ephraim alone, not by Manasseh, too. To wipe out this slight upon his own tribe, Gideon made an ephod bearing the name of Manasseh. He consecrated it to God, but after his death homage was paid to it as an idol. In those days the Israelites were so addicted to the worship of Beelzebub that they constantly carried small images of this god with them in their pockets, and every now and then they were in the habit of bringing the image forth and kissing it fervently. Of such idolaters were the vain and light fellows who helped Abimelech, the son of Gideon by his concubine from Shechem, to assassinate the other sons of his father. But God is just. As Abimelech murdered his brothers upon a stone, so Abimelech himself met his death through a millstone. It was proper, then, that Jotham, in his parable, should compare Abimelech to a thorn-bush, while he characterized his predecessors, Othniel, Deborah, and Gideon, as an olive-tree, or a fig-tree, or a vine. This Jotham, the youngest of the sons of Gideon, was more than a teller of parables. He knew then that long afterward the Samaritans would claim sanctity for Mount Gerizim, on account of the blessing pronounced from it upon the tribe. For this reason he chose Gerizim from which to hurl his curse upon Shechem and it inhabitants." "Tan B 1 103. The parable of Jotham is said to refer to the prominent judges: Othniel [=Olive tree], Deborah [=fig tree], Gideon [=vine], and Elimelech [=bramble]. Tan. also states that Abimelech reigned for three years, as a reward for the modesty of his father Gideon, who in a "tripartite" sentence refused the royal crown offered him by his people; see Jud. 8.23. Abimelech, in contrast to his father [Jud.8.27], was very greedy for riches, and his end therefore came speedily; Aggadat Bereshit 26, 54., see also ibid., 52-53 where Abimelech's wickedness and greed was contrasted with the piety and liberality of his namesake Abimelech, the King of Getar. The ingratitude of the Israelites who permitted Abimelech to murder the children of their benefactor Gideon was counted unto them as though they had forsaken God; ingratitude is as grave a sin as idolatry; Yelammedenu in Yalkut II, 64."

== Textual history ==
In the early twentieth century, the text of Judges 6–8 was regarded by the "critical school" as a composite narrative, combining Jahwist, Elohist and Deuteronomic sources, with further interpolations and editorial comments of the Second Temple period. According to this approach, the D source or (D) material has an overwhelming presence in Judges 6–8. The earlier source material used is present. However, the message and theological view has the style of the Deuteronomistic school of Authors. The core (Jahwist) narrative consists of Gideon wishing to avenge the death of his brothers, gathering 300 men of his own clan and pursuing the Midianite chiefs Zebah and Zalmunna, slaying them and consecrating an idol (ephod) made from the spoils of war, which makes his city of Ophrah the seat of an oracle and giving Gideon himself the status of a rich chief with a large harem (Judges 8:4–10a, 11–21, 24–27a, 29–32).

However, other scholars see the story as a single narrative, whose author made allusions to various Pentateuchal passages that he was familiar with. The story also contains consistent thematic elements which suggest a unified composition.

Emil G. Hirsch alleged a historical nucleus in the narrative, reflecting the struggle of the tribe of Manasseh with hostile Bedouins across the Jordan, along with "reminiscences of tribal jealousies on the part of Ephraim" in the early period of Hebrew settlement, later conflated with the religious context of connecting Yahweh with the shrine at Ophrah.

G. A. Cooke, writing in the Cambridge Bible for Schools and Colleges notes the discontinuity between Ephraimite anger towards Gideon shown in Judges 8:1–3 and the proposition of kingship over [all] Israel, and therefore concludes that "these verses appear to come from a [secondary] source".

According to Yairah Amit, Mark S. Smith, and Simon John De Vries, the use of both names "Gideon" and "Jerubbaal" reflects two originally independent sets of stories combined by an editor who wishes them to be seen as referring to a single character. The name Jerubbaal given to Gideon is originally a theophoric name meaning "Baal strives", but it was later given the interpretation of "let Baal strive against him" in order to avoid conflict with the more rigorous development of the religion of Yahweh in later centuries. (Note: "purposely framed to give the old name a bearing which would not be offensive to the later and more rigorous development of the religion of YHWH" (Hirsch 1906))

== Christian reception ==
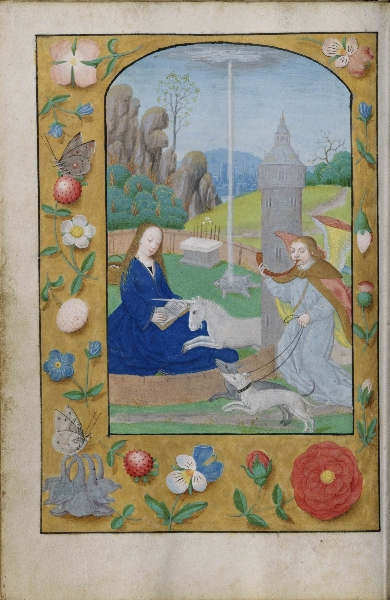
Gideon's fleece, as symbol of Mary, in a "Hunt of the Unicorn Annunciation" (c. 1500) from a Netherlandish book of hours. For the complicated iconography, see Hortus Conclusus.

In the New Testament, Gideon is mentioned in chapter 11 of the Epistle to the Hebrews as an example of a man of faith, one of several "heroes of faith" mentioned there:

Time would fail me to tell of Gideon [and others] who through faith subdued kingdoms, worked righteousness, obtained promises, stopped the mouths of lions, quenched the violence of fire, escaped the edge of the sword, out of weakness were made strong, became valiant in battle, turned to flight the armies of the aliens.

Gideon is regarded as a saint by the Eastern Orthodox Church and Catholic Church. He is also commemorated, together with the other righteous figures of the Old Testament, on the Sunday before Christmas (Fourth Sunday of Advent). He is commemorated as one of the Saints of the Armenian Apostolic Church on July 30, and in the Roman Martyrology on September 26.

In the Protestant Reformation, the Gideon narrative was employed in polemics against the Catholic clergy. Hans von Rüte's Gideon (1540) compares the removal of saints' relics from churches to Gideon's destruction of Baal's altar.

Gideons International is an American organization dedicated to Christian evangelism, founded in 1899, dedicated to the distribution of free Bibles. The organization's logo represents a two-handled pitcher and torch, symbolizing the implements used by Gideon to scare the Midianite army.

== Cultural references ==
The Gideons International, an evangelical Christian organization known for distributing Bibles, takes its name from Gideon:

Gideon was a man who was willing to do exactly what God wanted him to do, regardless of his own judgment as to the plans or results. Humility, faith, and obedience were his great elements of character. This is the standard that The Gideons International is trying to establish in all its members, each man to be ready to do God's will at any time, at any place, and in any way that the Holy Spirit leads.

=== Origin of the phrase "putting out a fleece" ===
The origin of the phrase "putting out a fleece" is a reference to the story of Gideon meaning to look for a sign from God before undertaking some action or carrying out some plan.

=== Military references ===
Much like the 300 Spartans in the Battle of Thermopylae, Gideon has become symbolic of military success of a small elite force against overwhelming numerical odds. The 12th-century Poem of Almería invokes "the strength of Samson and the sword of Gideon" in the context of the Reconquista of Almería led by Ponce Giraldo de Cabrera (1147). Benedikt Gletting (16th century) invokes the "Sword of Gideon" in a call for a pious and confident defense of the Old Swiss Confederacy against the threat of the Franco-Ottoman alliance. The Gideon narrative was invoked by Covenanter commander Archibald Strachan prior to Battle of Carbisdale (1650). The Gideon Force was a small British-led special force in the East African Campaign during World War II. El Junquito raid code-named Operation Gideon in 2018 and Operation Gideon (2020) were dissident military operations in Venezuela. Israel launched an offensive called "Operation Gideon's Chariots" in May 2025 during the Gaza war (2023–present).

== Archaeological evidence ==
A five-letter inscription appearing to represent the name Jerubbaal (another name used in the Hebrew Bible for Gideon) was discovered on a 3100-year old fragment of a jug in Israel. According to Smithsonian magazine, "the artifact's age lines up with the time period depicted in the Book of Judges."

== See also ==
- Gideon (name)
- Gideon, 1961 play
- The Gideons International, an evangelical Christian association whose primary activity is distributing free Bibles
- Talut, analogous Quranic figure
- Gideon the Ninth and the Locked Tomb Series by Tamsyn Miur
- The Golden Fleece is another motif representing fleece in Western art

Gideon of Manasseh Clan of Abieezer Cadet branch of the Tribe of Manasseh
Preceded by Deborah and Barak	Judge of Israel	Succeeded by Abimelech
