= Ophrah =

Ophrah (Hebrew: עֹפְרָה), (/ˈɔːfrə/ or /ˈɒfrə/) is a name in the Hebrew Bible meaning "a fawn" given to:

- A city of Benjamin (Joshua 18:23), probably identical with Ephron (2 Chron 13:19) and Ephraim (John 11:54), the modern Palestinian town of Taybeh. The Israeli settlement of Ofra is close to the site as well. According to Epiphanius, it was situated 5 miles east of the city of Bethel.
- "Ophrah of the Abi-ezrites," a city of Manasseh, 6 miles (10 km) southwest of Shechem, the residence of Gideon (Judges 6:11; 8:27,32). After his great victory over the Midianites, he slew at this place the captive kings (8:18–21). He then assumed the function of high priest and sought to make Ophrah what Shiloh should have been. This thing "became a snare" to Gideon and his house. After Gideon's death, his family resided here until they were put to death by Gideon's son Abimelech (Judges 9:5). It is identified with Ferata.
- A grandchild of Othniel Ben Kenaz, mentioned in 1 Chr 4:14.

== See also ==
- Ofer (disambiguation)
