= Zebah and Zalmunna =

Kings mentioned in the Hebrew Bible

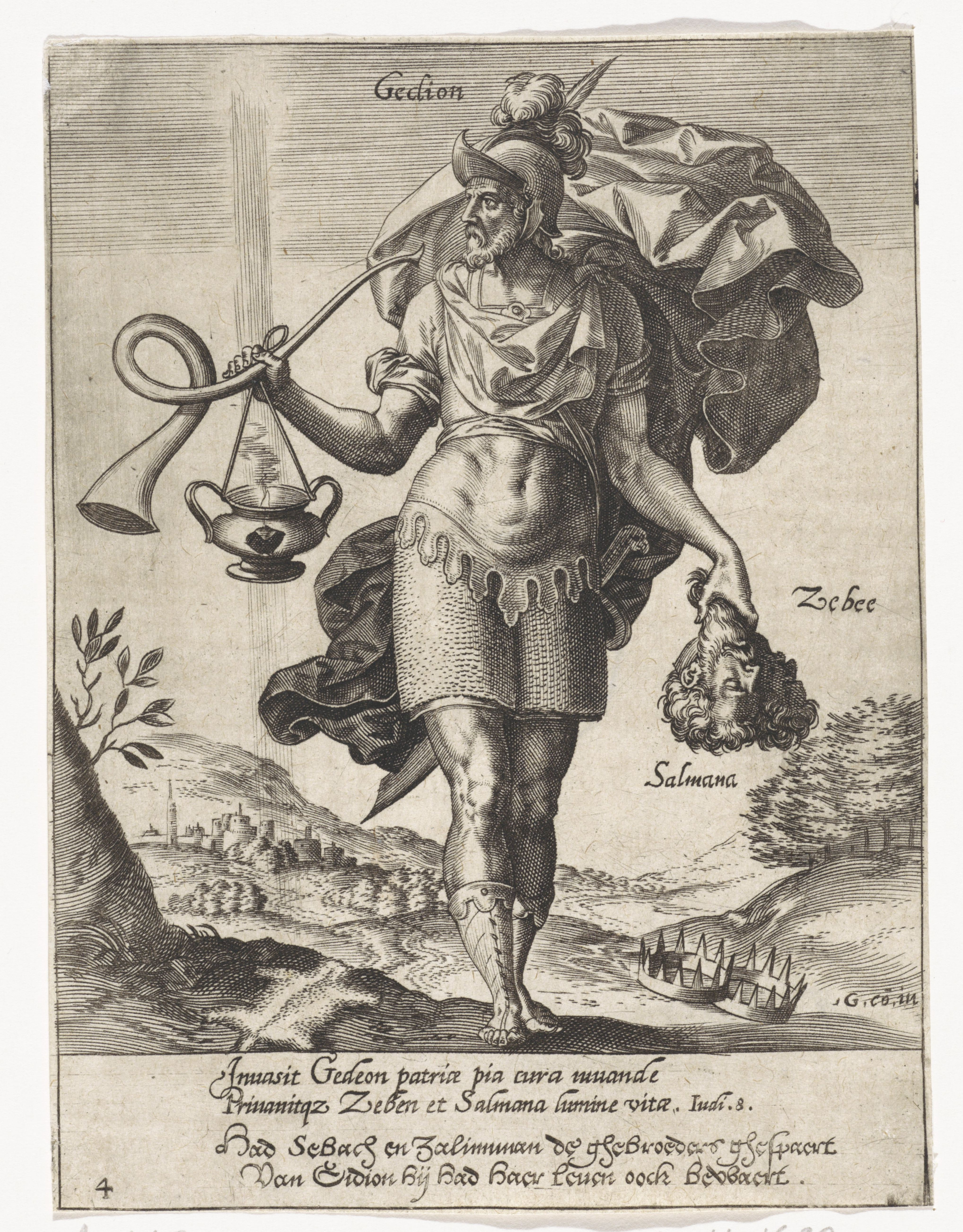
Landscape with Gideon. In his one hand the heads of Zebach and Salmunna, in his other a trumpet and an oil lamp. (Hieronymus Wierix)

Zebah (Hebrew: זֶ֫בַח Zeḇaḥ, "sacrifice", Zebee in the Brenton Septuagint Translation and the Douai-Rheims Bible) and Zalmunna (צַלְמֻנָּע Ṣalmunnā‘, "shade denied" or "Salm protects" Salmana in the Brenton Septuagint Translation and the Douai-Rheims Bible) were the two kings who led the vast host of the Midianites who invaded the land of Israel, and over whom Gideon gained a great and decisive victory (Judges 8). Zebah and Zalmunna had succeeded in escaping across the Jordan River with a remnant of the Midianite host, but were overtaken at Karkor, probably in the Hauran, and routed by Gideon. The kings were taken alive and brought back across the Jordan; and confessing that they had personally taken part in the killing of Gideon's brothers, they were put to death.

Their demise is remembered and invoked in Psalms 83:9–11:

Deal with them as with Midian ... yes, all their princes like Zebah and Zalmunna.

See also 1 Samuel 12:11 and Isaiah 10:26.
