= The Dead Sea Scrolls and the Christian Myth =

1979 book by John M. Allegro

- First Edition
- Author: John M. Allegro
- Language: English
- Subject: Dead Sea Scrolls, Essenes, Christianity, Fertility cults
- Publisher: Westbridge Books
- Publication date: 1979
- Publication place: United Kingdom
- Media type: Print
- Pages: 248–252 (1979 and 1984 eds.), 278 (1992 reissue)
- ISBN: 0715376802
- OCLC: 24907167

The Dead Sea Scrolls and the Christian Myth is a monograph by John Marco Allegro that situates early Christianity within the sectarian culture revealed by the Dead Sea Scrolls. Allegro sets New Testament themes alongside Essene writings and pesharim to reinterpret the Gospel narrative. First published in the United Kingdom by Westbridge Books in 1979, the study returned in 1984 and 1992 from Prometheus Books, the latter edition adding an essay on the politics surrounding Scrolls publication.

== Content ==
Allegro weaves a synthetic account of Qumran literature and history, claiming that core New Testament themes already appear in Essene writings. He treats the pesharim as historical commentaries, uses them to reconstruct conflict under Hasmonean rule, and maps motifs such as the Teacher of Righteousness, the Wicked Priest, judgment, and communal rites onto the beginnings of Christian proclamation. The 1992 reissue adds an authorial essay on disputes about access to the Scrolls and on his push for rapid publication.

=== Allegro's arguments and evidence ===
Allegro argues that the historical Jesus of the Gospels recasts an earlier Essene leader, the Teacher of Righteousness, and that emerging Gnostic currents flow directly from Essene doctrine. He links the Nahum Pesher to Alexander Jannaeus, reads its reference to victims "hung alive" as evidence of crucifixion in 88 BCE, and suggests that the sect's trauma and messianic exegesis shaped later Christian mythmaking. For the Nahum commentary he aligns the "Lion of Wrath" with Jannaeus and highlights the clause about hanging men alive, a reading widely discussed in secondary literature on 4QpNah.

Christian Myth includes two appendices that ground Allegro's theoretical claims in primary sources and contemporary debate. Appendix 1 publishes 4QTherapeia, a ten-line skin fragment acquired in 1952 from Bedouin who discovered Cave 4, together with Allegro's philological notes. Appendix 2 reproduces the so-called Secret Gospel of Mark passage and ties it to ritual practice, with Allegro asserting that its retelling of the rich young man describes a nocturnal initiation of a homosexual nature and linking it to semen-anointing ceremonies among Gnostics. Reviewer Joseph A. Fitzmyer details Allegro's additional proposals on Petrine names and offices, including speculative etymologies for Cephas and Caiaphas in relation to Essene roles, and questions the timing of 4QTherapeia's publication given Allegro's earlier claim that he had completed his assignments by 1968.

=== Structure and references ===
No.	Chapter title	Evidence presented	Scrolls referenced
1	The Essene Library	Details the discoveries of scrolls in Cave 1 (Isaiah), Cave 4 ("Partridge Chamber"), and the unique nature of the Copper Scroll. Introduces key figures like the Teacher of Righteousness.	Isaiah Scroll, Habakkuk Commentary, Thanksgiving Hymns, Community Rule, Copper Scroll
2	The Lion of Wrath	Identifies the "Lion of Wrath" as Alexander Jannaeus and his crucifixion of 800 opponents in 88 BCE as the "hanging men up alive." Suggests the Teacher of Righteousness was a victim.	Nahum Commentary (4QpNah), Habakkuk Commentary (1QpHab), Psalm 37 Commentary (4QpPsa)
3	Secacah in Galilee	Argues the Essenes chose Qumran (biblical Secacah) to fulfill prophecies from Ezekiel and Zechariah about a healing stream in the "eastern Galilee." Connects the site to the Teacher's Tree/Oak.	Thanksgiving Hymns (1QH), Copper Scroll, Book of Jubilees, Book of Enoch
4	Judgment and Hell-fire	Connects the Dead Sea region to myths of divine judgment (Sodom and Gomorrah), the imprisonment of fallen angels (from Book of Enoch), and the Essenes' identity as spiritual "Healers" (Rephaim).	Book of Enoch, Book of Jubilees, War Scroll (1QM)
5	Joshua, Son of Nun...	Argues the Teacher of Righteousness is a typological "second Joshua/Jesus," linking the biblical Joshua's actions near Jericho/Gilgal to the Teacher's ministry and crucifixion.	Testimonia (4Q175), Damascus Document (CD), Testaments of the Twelve Patriarchs, Hosea Commentary
6	Mortal Teacher to Immortal Christ	Traces the theological evolution of the martyred Teacher into a deified, Gnostic Christ figure (Logos/Word), drawing parallels with the Suffering Servant of Isaiah and discussing Merkabah mysticism.	Thanksgiving Hymns (1QH), fragments on Chariot Mysticism
7	The Celibate Ideal	Links Essene celibacy to the Gnostic ideal of rejecting the flesh, the desire to stop imprisoning divine "Light" in new bodies, and a general distrust of women.	An unnamed fragmentary manuscript on the dangers of women, Gospel of Thomas
8	The Love Feast	Reinterprets the Agape (Love Feast) through Gnostic sources as a ritual involving the sacramental consumption of semen and menstrual blood, seen as the concentrated "Substance of God."	Messianic Rule / Rule of the Congregation (1QSa)
9	The Noble Lie	Presents Gnostic mythmaking (the "noble lie") using the Simon Magus and Helen cycle as a parallel to the Jesus cycle, arguing both are non-historical myths built from biblical exegesis.	(Method is based on the Pesharim, but chapter relies on Patristic sources and Acts of the Apostles)
10	Tyre, Once Proud City	Traces the origin of the Simon/Helen myth to biblical oracles against Tyre (in Ezekiel, Isaiah, and Psalm 45), where the city is personified as a fallen harlot/queen.	A fragmentary commentary on Psalm 45 (4Q171)
11	Helen, the Harlot of Tyre, and the Light of the World	Decodes Helen as Wisdom/Sophia and the "torch" (helene) of Gnostic light. Explains the "Lamb of God" as a Semitic pun on "Word of God."	Continues the exegesis from Chapter 10
12	The Day-spring from on High	Decodes the title "Pillar" as a key sectarian office linked to the Morning Star ("Pillar of the Dawn"). Reinterprets "John the Baptist" as "John the Pillar" through a Semitic pun, and identifies Dositheus with the Teacher.	Damascus Document, Testimonia (4Q175), Thanksgiving Hymns (1QH)
13	"Will the real Jesus Christ please stand up?"	Argues the Gospel Jesus is a mythic construct based on the historical Teacher. Decodes the stories of Golgotha (as a pun on "poll-tax") and Zacchaeus (as an allusion to the "Teacher of Righteousness") from wordplay on the book of Hosea.	Relies on the Pesher method of exegesis derived from the scrolls
14	"And on this Rock..."	Argues that the "Rock" (Peter/Cephas) is not a person but an office, the Caiaphas or "Investigator." Compares the roles of Peter in the New Testament to the duties of the Essene Overseer (Mebaqqer).	4QTherapeia, Damascus Document (CD), Community Rule (1QS)
15	Know Thyself	Concludes by summarizing the conflict between Jewish and Gnostic views of creation and connects the Gnostic principle of self-knowledge ("Know thyself") to modern Existentialism philosophy.	Thanksgiving Hymns (1QH), Community Rule (1QS)

== Analysis ==
The book appeared nine years after Allegro left academia following the publication of The Sacred Mushroom and the Cross. It presents his reconstruction of life at Qumran and in Judea during the first century CE, the period in which Jesus is traditionally dated to have lived.

Allegro frames the volume as a maximalist Essene hypothesis for Christian origins. Methodologically he foregrounds cross references among pesharim, reconstructions of late Hasmonean violence, and philological proposals about names and titles. He treats Essene exegesis as a template for Gospel composition, argues for strong continuity between sectarian eschatology and later Christology, and anchors typological correspondences in trauma events under Jannaeus. Critics respond that this chain of inference rests on disputed identifications in the pesharim, speculative etymologies for personal names and offices, and ritual readings that outrun the textual controls available in the Scrolls corpus. A later scholarly survey of Allegro's career describes the volume as the fullest presentation of his view that the historical Jesus did not exist and that the Gospel figure is an adaptation of the Qumran Teacher, further noting that the book drew little engagement from mainstream Dead Sea Scrolls scholarship after publication.

Allegro later contended that scholarly enthusiasm for the Dead Sea Scrolls cooled as their implications for Christian distinctiveness emerged, proposing that committed biblical scholars hesitated to circulate findings that could unsettle tradition. He noted the "strange" absence of definitive editions for much of the material discovered after the first cave, echoing Edmund Wilson's 1955 suggestion in Scrolls from the Dead Sea that institutions were reluctant to pursue the Scrolls' full implications. Writers such as Richard Leigh and Michael Baigent adopted this perspective in The Dead Sea Scrolls Deception, a book critics describe as advancing conspiratorial claims rather than history.

== Reaction ==
Contemporary academic reviews were largely negative. Fitzmyer, a prominent Jesuit biblical scholar and Dead Sea Scrolls specialist, wrote that the work relied on "many generalizations, strained etymologies, one-sided reading of evidence, and a patent desire to titillate." He rejected Allegro's speculative reconstructions of Petrine names and offices, including proposals that linked Simon to Greek sêmeion ("sign"), Cephas to an Essene office called Caiaphas meaning "Investigator, Prognosticator," and bariôna to Aramaic baryonä ("divination"). Fitzmyer viewed these "free associations" as revealing "more about the author than about the myth," though he acknowledged the book's clear presentation of its thesis for a general audience. Leonard F. Badia, writing in the theological journal Horizons, voiced similar reservations and situated the book among Allegro's late-period Prometheus titles.

Later evangelical surveys of debates on Qumran and Christian origins note that Allegro's model did not gain traction in the field and is cited mainly as an example of speculative reconstruction built on contested identifications in the pesharim.
