= List of manuscripts from Qumran Cave 3 =

List of Dead Sea Scrolls from Qumran Cave 3

List of the manuscripts from Qumran Cave 3
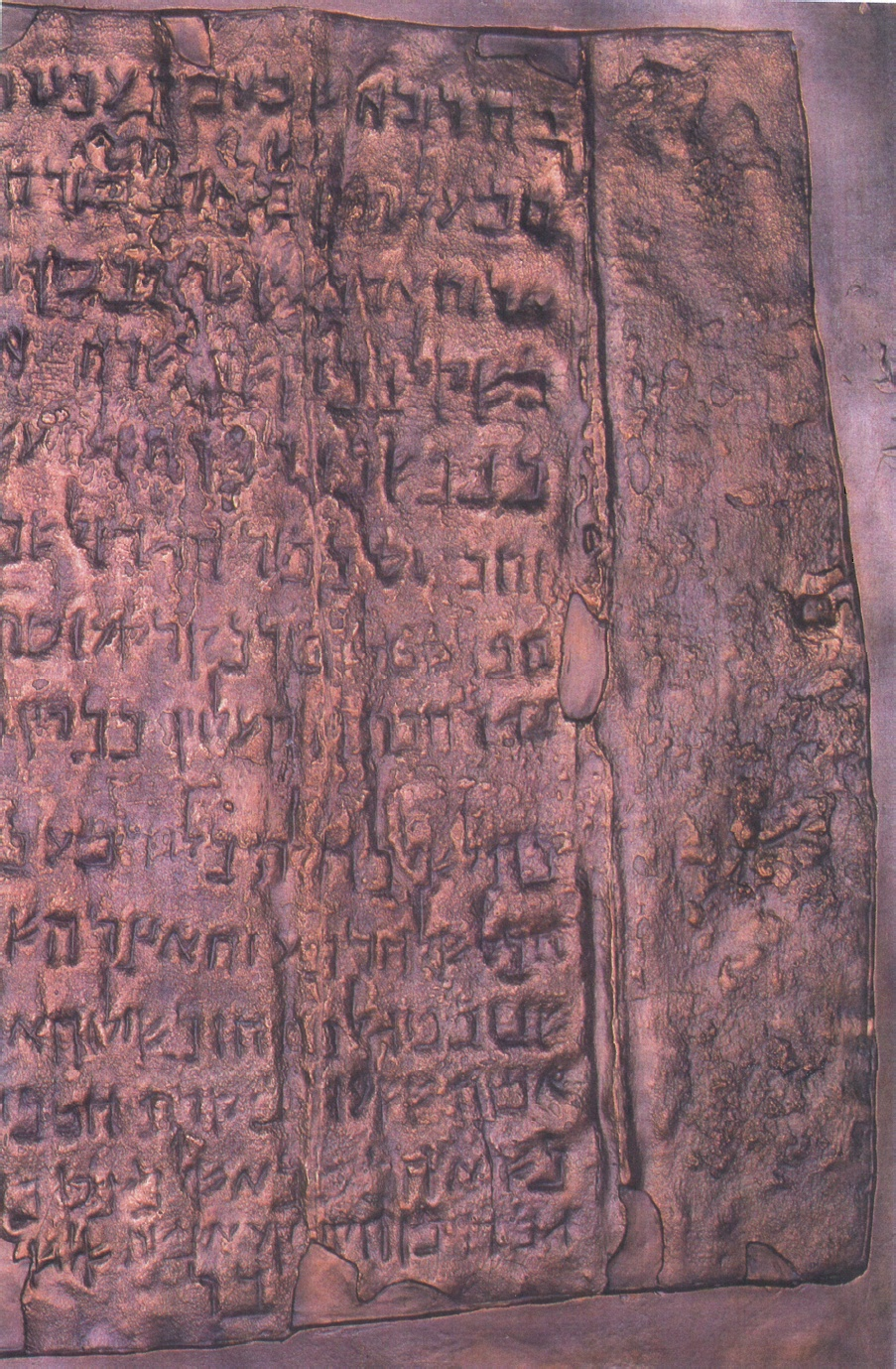
- A part of a replica of the Copper Scroll that was found in Qumran Cave 3.
- Material: Papyrus, Parchment, and Copper
- Writing: Hebrew, Aramaic, Greek, and Nabataean
- Created: Est. 408 BCE to 318 CE
- Discovered: 1952
- Present location: Qumran

The following is a list of the Dead Sea Scrolls from the cave 3 near Qumran.

== Description ==
Wadi Qumran Cave 3 was discovered on 14 March 1952 by the ASOR team. The cave initially yielded fragments of Jubilees and the Copper Scroll.

== List of manuscripts ==
Some resources for more complete information on the Dead Sea Scrolls are the book by Emanuel Tov, "Revised Lists of the Texts from the Judaean Desert" for a complete list of all of the Dead Sea Scroll texts, as well as the online webpages for the Shrine of the Book and the Leon Levy Collection, both of which present photographs and images of the scrolls and fragments themselves for closer study. Information is not always comprehensive, as content for many scrolls has not yet been fully published.

Fragment or scroll identifier	Fragment or scroll name	Alternative identifier	English Bible Association	Language	Date/script	Description	Reference
Qumran Cave 3
3QEzek	Ezekiel	3Q1	Ezekiel 16:31–33	Hebrew	Herodian		
3QPs	Psalms	3Q2	Psalm 2:6–7	Hebrew	Herodian		
3QLam	Lamentations	3Q3	Lamentations 1:10–12; 3:53–62	Hebrew	Herodian		
3QpIsa	Pesher on Isaiah	3Q4	Isaiah 1:1	Hebrew	Herodian		
3QJub	Jubilees	3Q5		Hebrew	Herodian	Jubilees 23:6–7, 12–13, 23	
3QHymn	Unidentified Hymn	3Q6		Hebrew	Herodian	Hymn of Praise	
3QTJud(?)	Testament of Judah(?)	3Q7		Hebrew	Herodian	cf. 4Q484, 4Q538	
3Q Text Mentioning Angel of Peace		3Q8		Hebrew	Herodian	Text about an Angel of Peace	
3QSectarian text		3Q9		Hebrew	Herodian	Possible unidentified Sectarian text	
3QUnc	Unidentified	3Q10 3Q11		Hebrew	Hellenistic-Roman	Unclassified fragments	
3QUncA-B	Unclassified fragments	3Q12 3Q13		Aramaic	Hellenistic-Roman	Unclassified fragments	
3QUncC	Unidentified	3Q14		Hebrew?	Hellenistic-Roman	21 unclassified fragments	
3QCopScr	The Copper Scroll	3Q15		Hebrew	Roman	Copper plaque mentioning buried treasures	

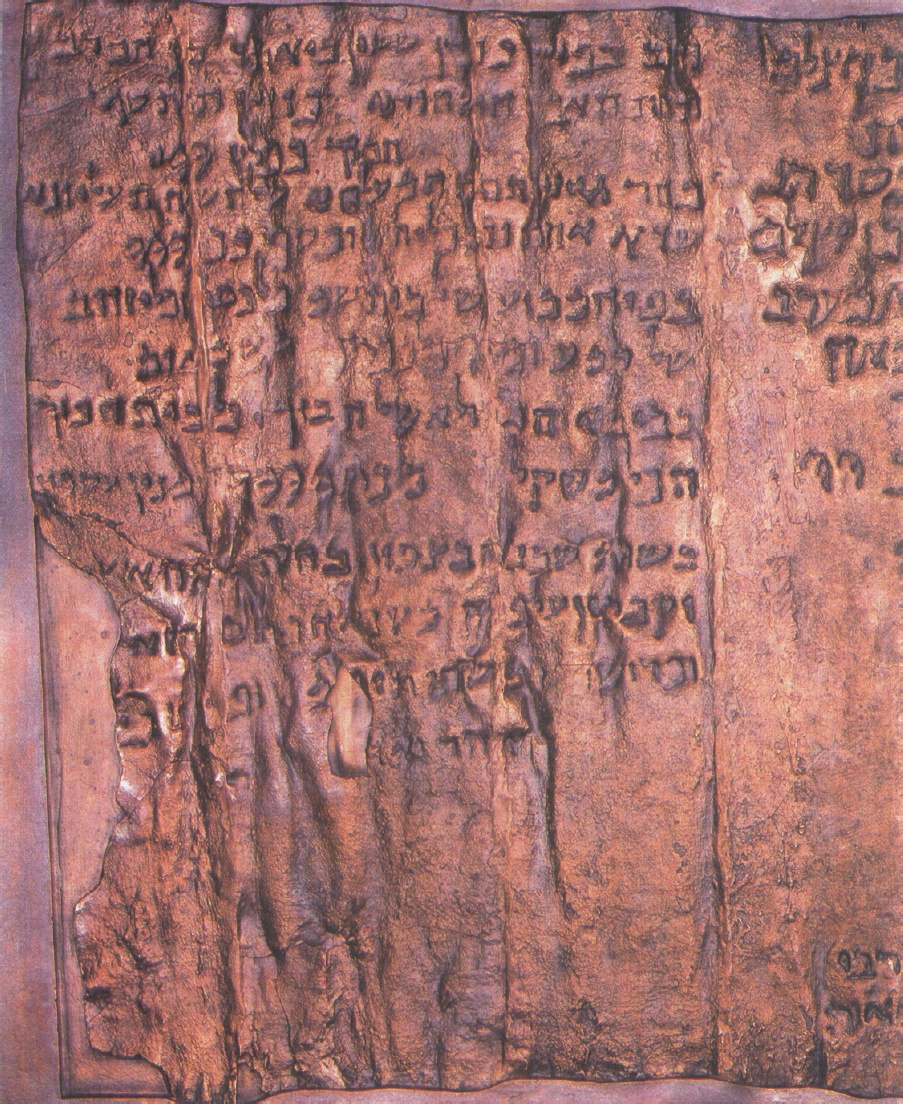
A part of a replica of the Copper Scroll.

== See also ==
- Biblical manuscripts
- Septuagint manuscripts
- List of Hebrew Bible manuscripts

== Bibliography ==
- Fitzmyer, Joseph A. (2008). A Guide to the Dead Sea Scrolls and Related Literature. Grand Rapids, MI: William B. Eerdmans Publishing Company. ISBN 9780802862419.
