= Kohlit =

Location named in the Copper Scroll of the Dead Sea Scrolls

Kohlit or Kohalit (Hebrew: כּוֹחֲלִית) is a place name used in rabbinic literature, and more famously in the Copper Scroll, a unique "treasure map" discovered among the Dead Sea Scrolls (DSS). It is unknown whether the two sources are referring to the same place.

== Copper Scroll ==
Kohlit is a place, possibly a hill, mentioned several times in the Copper Scroll, one of the Dead Sea Scrolls. Kohlit has become something of a modern-day El Dorado for treasure hunters.

It is indicated as the area where the second Copper Scroll, containing a more detailed list, is buried.

== Babylonian Talmud ==
Kohalit is also named in b. Qid. 66a (chapter 66a of tractate Kiddushin of the Babylonian Talmud) as an area east of the Jordan River where Alexander Jannaeus had led a successful military campaign.

== Bibliography ==
- Donald W. Parry; Stephen D. Ricks. "The Dead Sea Scrolls: Sectarian Texts". Meridian Magazine. Archived from the original on March 4, 2001.
