= Talent (measurement) =

Ancient unit of mass

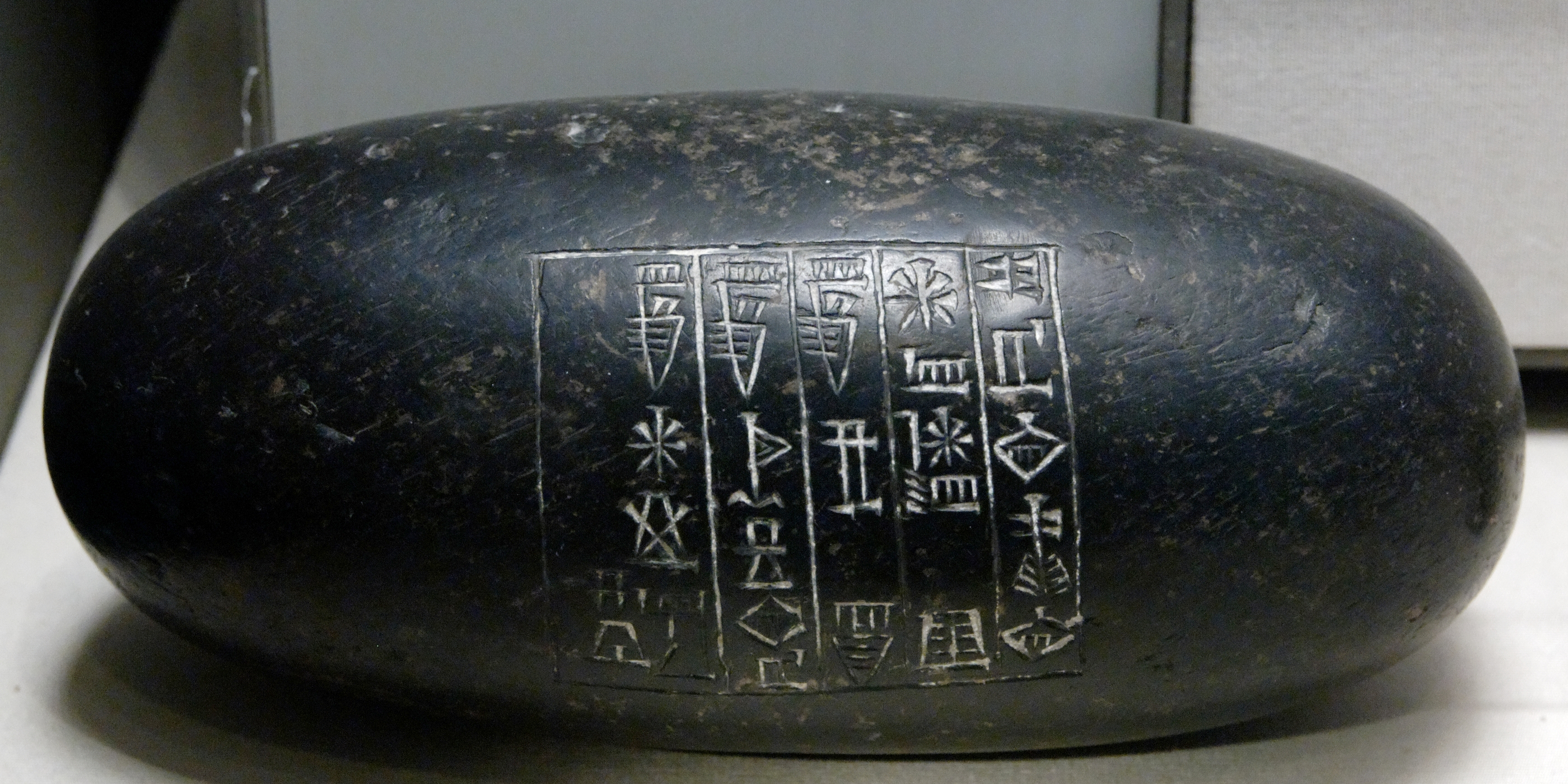
Sumerian tablet with measurement glyphs

The talent (Ancient Greek: τάλαντον, talanton, Latin: talentum, Biblical Hebrew: kikkar כִּכָּר, Ugaritic: kkr (𐎋𐎋𐎗), Phoenician: kkr (𐤒𐤒𐤓), Syriac: kakra (ܟܲܟܪܵܐ),, Akkadian: kakkaru or gaggaru in the Amarna tablets, later Aramaic: qintara (קינטרא)) was a unit of weight used in the ancient world, often used for weighing gold and silver.

In the Hebrew Bible, it is recorded that the gold used in the work of the sanctuary (tabernacle), where the Ark of the Covenant was, weighed 29 talents and 730 shekels, and silver 100 talents and 1,775 shekels (1 talent = 3,000 shekels). The enormous wealth of King Solomon is described as receiving 666 gold talents per year.

The talent is also mentioned in connection with other metals, ivory, and frankincense. In Homer's poems, it is always used of gold and is thought to have been quite a small weight of about 8.5 grams (0.30 oz), approximately the same as the later gold stater coin or Persian daric.

In later periods in Greece, it represented a much larger weight: approximately 3,000 times as much; an Attic talent was approximately 26.0 kilograms (57 lb 5 oz). The word also came to be used as the equivalent of the Middle Eastern kakkaru or kikkar. A Babylonian talent was 30.2 kg (66 lb 9 oz). Ancient Israel adopted the Babylonian weight talent, but later revised it. The heavy common talent, used in the Second Temple period, was 58.9 kg (129 lb 14 oz). A Roman talent (divided into 100 librae or pounds) was 1 1/3 Attic talents, approximately 32.3 kg (71 lb 3 oz). An Egyptian talent was 80 librae, approximately 27 kg (60 lb).

== Akkadian talent ==
The Akkadian talent was called kakkaru in the Akkadian language, corresponding to Biblical Hebrew kikkar כִּכָּר (translated as Greek τάλαντον 'talanton' in the Septuagint, English 'talent'), Ugaritic kkr (𐎋𐎋𐎗), Phoenician kkr (𐤒𐤒𐤓), Syriac kakra (ܟܲܟܪܵܐ), and apparently to gaggaru in the Amarna Tablets. The name comes from the Semitic root KKR meaning 'to be circular', referring to round masses of gold or silver. The kakkaru or talent weight was introduced in Mesopotamia at the end of the 4th millennium BC. It was normalized at the end of the 3rd millennium during the Akkadian-Sumer phase. The talent was divided into 60 minas, each subdivided into 60 shekels (following the common Mesopotamian sexagesimal number system). These weights were used subsequently by the Babylonians, Sumerians and Phoenicians, and later by the Hebrews. The Babylonian weights are approximately: shekel (8.4 g, 0.30 oz), mina (504 g, 1 lb 1.8 oz) and talent (30.2 kg, 66 lb 9 oz).

The Greeks adopted these weights through their trade with the Phoenicians, along with the ratio of 60 minas to one talent. A Greek mina in Euboea around 800 BC weighed 504 g; other minas in the Mediterranean basin, and even other Greek minas, varied in some small measure from the Babylonian values, and from one to another. The Bible mentions the unit in various contexts, like Hiram king of Tyre sending 120 talents of gold to King Solomon as part of an alliance, or the building of the candelabrum necessitating a talent of pure gold.

=== Origin ===
William Ridgeway speculates that the kakkaru/kikkar was originally the weight of a load that a man could carry. Thus in the Book of Kings we read that Naaman "bound two talents of silver in two bags, with two changes of garments, and laid them upon two of his servants; and they bare them before him". He notes that in Assyrian cuneiform, the same ideogram or sign was used for both "tribute" and "talent", which might be explained if a load of corn was the regular unit of tribute.

== Homeric talent ==
In Homer, the word τάλαντα in the plural is sometimes used of a pair of scales or a balance; it is used especially of the scales in which Zeus weighed the fortunes of men (Iliad 8.69, 19.223, 22.209). The term is also used as a unit of measurement, always denoting gold. "From the order of the prizes in Il. 23.262 sq. and other passages, its weight was probably not great".

According to Seltman, the original Homeric talent was probably the gold equivalent of the value of an ox or a cow. Homer describes how Achilles set an ox as 2nd prize in a foot race, and a half-talent of gold as the third prize, suggesting that the ox was worth a talent. Based on a statement from a later Greek source that "the talent of Homer was equal in amount to the later daric [... i.e.] two Attic drachmas" and analysis of finds from a Mycenaean grave-shaft, a weight of about 8.5 grams (0.30 oz) can be established for this original talent. The later Attic talent was of a different weight than the Homeric, but represented the same value in copper as the Homeric did in gold, with the price ratio of gold to copper in Bronze Age Greece being 1:3000.

== Attic talent ==
An Attic talent was the equivalent of 60 minae or 6,000 drachmae.

An Attic weight talent was about 25.8 kilograms (57 lb). Friedrich Hultsch estimated a weight of 26.2 kg, and Dewald (1998) offers an estimate of 26.0 kg. An Attic talent of silver was the value of nine man-years of skilled work, according to known wage rates from 377 BC. In 415 BC, an Attic talent was a month's pay for a trireme crew. Hellenistic mercenaries were commonly paid one drachma per day of military service.

== Aeginetan talent ==
The Aeginetan talent weighed about 37 kg (82 lb). The German historian Friedrich Hultsch calculated a range of 36.15 to 37.2 kg (79.7 to 82.0 lb) based on such estimates as the weight of one full Aeginetan metretes of coins, and concluded that the Aeginetan talent represented the water weight of a Babylonian ephah: 36.29 kg (80.0 lb) by his reckoning (the metretes and the ephah were units of volume). Percy Gardner estimated a weight of 37.32 kg (82.3 lb), based on extant weights and coins.

An Aeginetan talent was worth 60 Aeginetan minae, or 6,000 Aeginetan drachmae.

== Talent in late Hebrew antiquity ==
The talent (Hebrew: ככר, kikkar; Aramaic: קינטרא, qintara) in late Hebrew antiquity (c. 500 CE) was the greatest unit of weight in use at the time, and which weight varied depending on the era. According to the Jerusalem Talmud (Sanhedrin 9a, Pnei Moshe Commentary, s.v. דכתיב בקע לגלגלת), the weight of the talent at the time of Moses was double that of the Roman era talent, which latter had the weight of either 100 maneh (Roman librae), or 60 maneh (Roman librae), each maneh (libra) having the weight of 25 selas (sela being a term used for the biblical Shekel of Tyrian coinage, or 'shekel of the Sanctuary', and where there were 4 provincial denarii or zuz to each sela; 25 selas being equivalent to 100 denaria).

The standard talent during the late Second Temple period was the talent consisting of 60 maneh. According to Talmudic scholars, the talent (kikkar) of 60 maneh (and which sum total of 60 maneh equals 1,500 selas, or 6,000 denarii (the denarius also being known in Hebrew as zuz), had a weight of 150 dirham for every 25 selas. The anatomic weight of each dirham at that time was put at 3.20 grammes, with every sela or 'shekel of the sanctuary' weighing-in at 20.16 grammes. The sum aggregate of the 60 maneh talent (or 1,500 selas) came to about 28.8 kilograms (63 lb). According to Adani, in the silver coinage known as the Mughal India rupaiya, minted during British colonial rule (each with a weight of 11.6638038 grammes (1 tola), of which weight only 91.7% was of fine silver), one talent (Heb. kikkar) would have amounted to 2,343 of these silver coins in specie (27.328 kilograms (60.25 lb)), in addition to the minuscule weight of 12 ma’in (10.08 grammes).

== Talent in the New Testament ==
The talent as a unit of value is mentioned in the New Testament in Jesus' Parable of the Talents (Matthew 25:14–30). The use of the word "talent" to mean "gift or skill" in English and other languages originated from an interpretation of this parable sometime late in the 13th century. Luke includes a different parable involving the mina. According to Epiphanius, the talent is called mina (maneh) among the Hebrews, and was the equivalent in weight to one-hundred denarii. The talent is found in another parable of Jesus where a servant who is forgiven a debt of ten thousand talents refuses to forgive another servant who owes him only one hundred silver denarii.

In Revelation 16:21, the talent is used as a weight for hail being poured forth from heaven and dropping on humanity as punishment in the end times: "And there fell upon men a great hail out of heaven, every stone about the weight of a talent: and men blasphemed God because of the plague of the hail; for the plague thereof was exceeding great." (KJV) Various definitions are provided in different translations:

- NIV: a footnote says "Talent: 75 or 100 pounds."
- NLT: text reads "weighing as much as seventy-five pounds".
- ESV: text reads "about one hundred pounds each".

== Bibliography ==
- Herodotus (1998) [440 BC]. Dewald, Carolyn (ed.). The Histories. Translated by Waterfield, Robin. Oxford University Press. ISBN 9780192126092.
- Hultsch, Friedrich (1882). Griechische und Römische Metrologie [Greek and Roman Metrology] (in German) (2nd ed.). Weidmannsche Buchhandlung.
