= Lenin was a mushroom =

1991 Soviet television hoax

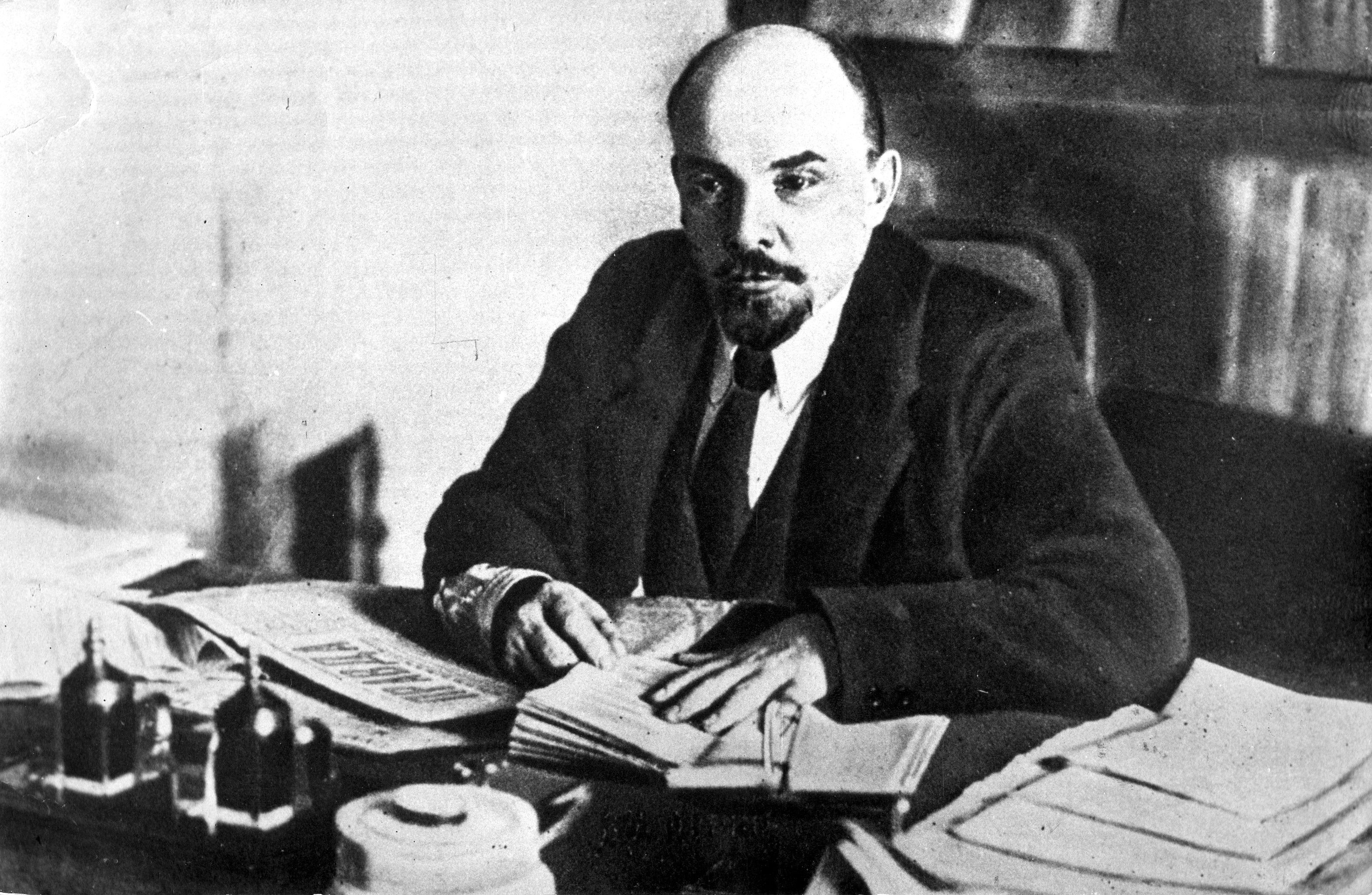
Kuryokhin proposed that the round item seen here was a melocactus and evidence of a mushroom habit.

Lenin was a mushroom (Russian: Ленин — гриб) was a televised hoax by Soviet musician Sergey Kuryokhin and reporter Sergey Sholokhov. It was first broadcast on 17 May 1991 on Leningrad Television, in a form of an interview about the supposed findings that Vladimir Lenin was in fact a mushroom.

== Hoax ==
The hoax took the form of an interview on the television program The Fifth Wheel. In the interview, Kuryokhin, impersonating a historian, narrated his supposed findings that Vladimir Lenin consumed large quantities of psychedelic mushrooms and as a result, transformed himself into a mushroom and a radio wave. Kuryokhin arrived at his conclusion through a long series of logical fallacies and appeals to the authority of various "sources" (such as Carlos Castaneda, the Massachusetts Institute of Technology, and Konstantin Tsiolkovsky), creating the illusion of a reasoned and plausible logical chain. Proof included such "arguments" as the similarity between the cross-section of the armored car from which Lenin spoke and the mushroom spawn of a fly agaric and the claim that "ninel" (Lenin spelled backwards) is a French mushroom dish.

…And, accordingly, into a radio wave. So, a person becomes both a mushroom and a radio wave in a single form, you understand? And now I'll tell you what's most important, what I'm getting at. I have absolutely irrefutable evidence that the entire October Revolution was conducted by people who consumed the corresponding mushrooms for many years. And the mushrooms, as they were consumed by these people, displaced their personalities, and people became mushrooms. So, I am simply trying to say that Lenin was a mushroom. And not just a mushroom; he was also a radio wave. Do you understand?

<…> I once came across a phrase from a letter from Lenin to [Georgi] Plekhanov. The phrase goes like this: "Yesterday I ate a lot of mushrooms and felt amazing."
<…> Look here for a second. Do you see? Lenin is always with different people. Look closely, there's some boy standing to the right (we'll come back to him later). There he is again, see? Lenin always has some boy by his side. So, you see, we've moved on to another part of the film... the same boy again. See, there he is, just passing by. His hair is a little different, but it's the same boy. The thing is, there's a boy constantly by Lenin's side.

Sasha was constantly with Lenin because he knew every path, he knew all the mushroom spots, and he led Lenin to all the mushroom spots, as we saw in the film. This isn't just speculation.

— Kuryokhin

== Background ==
Kuryokhin's widow, Anastasia, explained the origin of the hoax in an interview with Komsomolskaya Pravda:

The idea for the show came about like this: Sergei once saw a program about Sergei Yesenin's death. The program's host presented the argument that the poet was murdered based on completely absurd claims. They showed photographs of Yesenin's funeral, and the voiceover said, "Look where this man is looking, and this one is looking the other way, and that means Yesenin was murdered..." Sergei watched the program and told me, "You can prove anything like that."

—

== Impact ==
The timing of the hoax played a large role in its notoriety, coming as it did during the height of the glasnost period, which was characterized by the ebbing of censorship in the Soviet Union; many facts about Soviet history that were previously inaccessible and classified were being made public, leading to many controversial revelations about the country's history, often presented in sensationalistic form.

Sholokhov claimed that as a result of the show, an appeal was made by a group of older Communist Party members to the Leningrad Regional Committee of the CPSU to clarify the veracity of Kuryokhin's claim. According to Sholokhov, in response to the request, a former agitprop functionary, director of the Leninrad Lenin museum Galina Barinova stated that Lenin could not have been a mushroom because a mammal cannot be a plant. (Modern taxonomy classifies mushrooms as fungi, a separate kingdom from plants.) Sociologist Alexei Yurchak has questioned the veracity of Sholokhov's account.

== See also ==
- The Sacred Mushroom and the Cross
