= Sergey Sholokhov (journalist) =

Russian journalist (1958–2026)

Sergey Sholokhov Сергей Шолохов
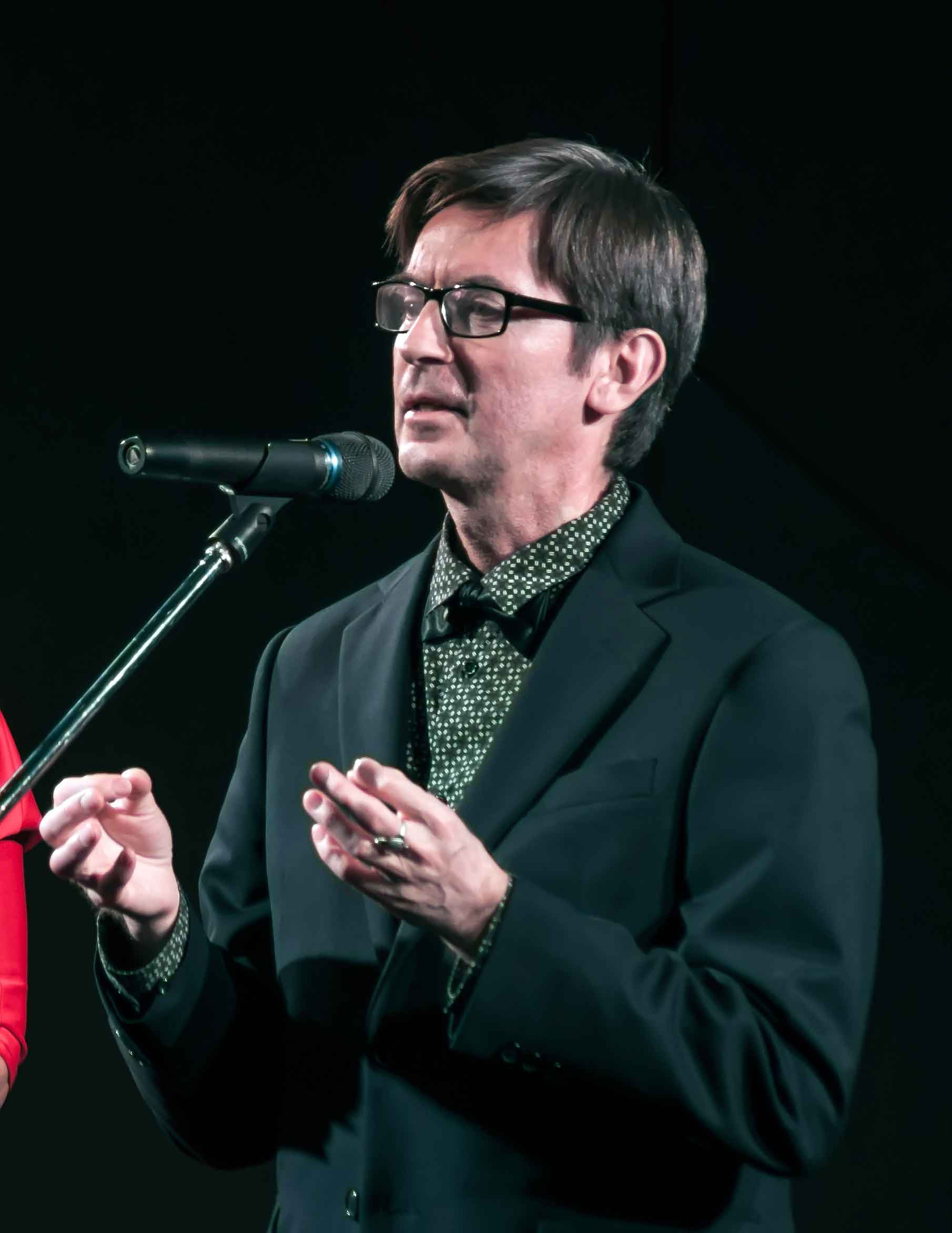
- Sholokhov in 2017
- Born: Sergey Leonidovich Sholokhov; 27 September 1958; Leningrad, Russian SFSR, USSR
- Died: 18 July 2026 (aged 67); Saint Petersburg, Russia
- Citizenship: Moscow
- Occupations: Film critic, journalist, TV presenter
- Spouse: Tatyana Moskvina
- Children: 2

Sergey Leonidovich Sholokhov (Russian: Серге́й Леони́дович Шо́лохов; 27 September 1958 – 18 July 2026) was a Soviet and Russian journalist. He was a Candidate of Art Sciences and winner of the Golden Pen '96 (Journalist of the Year) and Academician of the Academy Nika Award.

Sholokhov was called one of the most authoritative film and theater critics of Russia.

In 1991 Sholokhov and Sergey Kuryokhin broadcast the influential televised hoax Lenin was a mushroom.

From 1991 and 1992 he worked in the management School at Harvard University as a visiting researcher.

Sholokhov died on 18 July 2026, at the age of 67.
