= John M. Allegro =

English archaeologist

John Marco Allegro
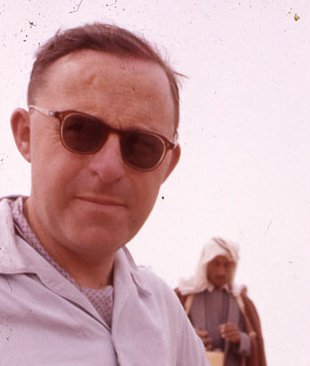
- John Allegro
- Born: 17 February 1923; Balham, South London, UK
- Died: 17 February 1988 (aged 65); Sandbach, Cheshire, UK
- Known for: The Sacred Mushroom and the Cross, Dead Sea Scrolls studies
- Scientific career
- Fields: Archaeology

John Marco Allegro (17 February 1923 – 17 February 1988) was an English archaeologist and Dead Sea Scrolls scholar. He was a populariser of the Dead Sea Scrolls through his books and radio broadcasts. He was the editor of some of the most famous and controversial scrolls published, the pesharim. A number of Allegro's later books, including The Sacred Mushroom and the Cross, brought him both popular fame and notoriety, and also complicated his career.

Allegro served in the Royal Navy during World War II, began training for the Methodist ministry but shifted to Oriental Studies, earning degrees from Manchester and Oxford before joining the Dead Sea Scrolls research team in Jerusalem and becoming a lecturer in Semitic Philology in 1954. He played a pivotal role in the early study and popularization of the Copper Scroll by arranging its physical opening, producing the first translation, controversially publishing it ahead of the official edition, and promoting theories about its content that drew criticism from his peers.

John Marco Allegro published the Dead Sea Scrolls fragments 4Q158–4Q186, which contained pesharim—unique biblical commentaries—in a minimalist edition after delays from the late 1950s until 1968. Although his approach faced widespread scholarly criticism, it nonetheless provided decades of material for study while other editors worked on their volumes.

By 1960, Allegro, holding controversial views on the Dead Sea Scrolls and clashing with colleagues, moved to theology at Manchester where he wrote the provocative book The Sacred Mushroom and the Cross and subsequently resigned due to its impact. John Allegro’s controversial theory argued that Christianity originated from an Essene shamanistic cult using psychoactive mushrooms, interpreting the New Testament as a coded record of this cult, but his ideas were widely rejected by scholars and led to his academic ostracism. Married with two children, he died of a heart attack on his 65th birthday in 1988, and was noted for his flamboyant style in biblical studies.

== Early life and training ==
Allegro was born in 1923, son of John Allegro and Mabel (nee Perry). Allegro went through Wallington County Grammar School in 1939. He joined the Royal Navy, serving during World War Two. After the war he began training for the Methodist ministry, but found that he was more interested in Hebrew and Greek, so he went to study at Manchester University with fees paid by government grant due to his military service. Allegro received his Honours degree in Oriental Studies at the University of Manchester in 1951. This was followed in 1952 by a master's degree under supervision of H. H. Rowley. While engaged in further research in Hebrew dialects at Oxford under Godfrey Driver in 1953, Allegro was invited by Gerald Lankester Harding to join the team of scholars working on the Dead Sea Scrolls in Jerusalem, where he spent one year working on the scrolls. He became a lecturer in Comparative Semitic Philology in Manchester in 1954.

== The Copper Scroll ==
It was on Allegro's recommendation in 1955 that the Copper Scroll was sent by the Jordanian government to Manchester University in order for it to be cut into sections, allowing the text to be read. He was present during the cutting process in 1956 and later made a preliminary transcription of the text, which he soon translated, sending copies of his work back to Gerald Lankester Harding in Jordan. Although Allegro had been first to translate the Copper Scroll, the text was assigned for editing to J.T. Milik by Roland de Vaux, the editor in chief of the scrolls. While he was in England he made a series of radio broadcasts on BBC Radio aimed at popularising the scrolls, in which he announced that the leader discussed in the scrolls may have been crucified. He posited that the Teacher of Righteousness had been martyred and crucified by Alexander Jannaeus, and that his followers believed he would reappear at the End time as Messiah, based on Qumran document Commentary on Nahum 1.4–9 (a position that he re-iterated in 1986). His colleagues in Jerusalem immediately responded with a letter to the Times on 16 March 1956 refuting his claim. The letter concluded,

It is our conviction that either he [Allegro] has misread the texts or he has built up a chain of conjectures which the materials do not support.

One result of this letter seemed to be that his appointment at Manchester was not to be renewed. However, in July after several uneasy months the appointment was renewed.

Allegro was asked a number of times by the Jordanian Director of Antiquities if he would publish the text of the Copper Scroll. After a few years of waiting for Milik's publication of the scroll, Allegro succumbed and set about publishing the text. His book, The Treasure of the Copper Scroll, was released in 1960, while the official publication had to wait another two years. Although several of his readings in the text are acknowledged, Allegro's book was disparaged by his colleagues. He believed that the treasure in the scroll was real—a view now held by most scholars—and led an expedition to attempt to find items mentioned in the scroll, though without success.

During this period Allegro also published two popular books on the Dead Sea scrolls, The Dead Sea Scrolls (1956) and The People of the Dead Sea Scrolls (1958). He was keen to photograph the site of Qumran and various texts, providing an important source of information for posterity.

== Publishing the Pesharim ==
Allegro was entrusted with the publication of 4Q158–4Q186, a collection of fragments which mainly contained exemplars of a unique kind of commentary on biblical works known as pesharim. He believed that it was necessary to get these works out as quickly as possible and published several preliminary editions in learned journals during the late 1950s. He told de Vaux that he could have his share of the texts ready in 1960, but due to hold ups had to wait until 1968 for his volume, Discoveries in the Judaean Desert of Jordan V: 4Q158–4Q186, to be published. He reworked his material in 1966 with the assistance of a Manchester colleague, Arnold Anderson, before publication. He stated in the volume that

"it has been my practice to offer no more than the basic essentials of photographs, transliteration, translation of non-biblical passages where this might serve some useful interpretative purpose, and the minimum of textual notes."

John Strugnell published a severe critique of the volume, "Notes en Marge du volume V des 'Discoveries in the Judean Desert of Jordan'" in Revue de Qumran. Allegro's minimalist approach has received widespread scorn in the scholarly world, which nevertheless had the opportunity to analyse the Allegro texts for decades while waiting for other editors to publish their allotments. The first part of Strugnell's allotment was published in 1994.

== Change of direction ==
As early as 1956 Allegro held controversial views regarding the content of the scrolls, stating in a letter to de Vaux, "It's a pity that you and your friends cannot conceive of anything written about Christianity without trying to grind some ecclesiastical or non-ecclesiastical axe." The bulk of his work on the Dead Sea Scrolls was done by 1960 and he was at odds with his scrolls colleagues. When a conflict broke out with H.H. Rowley concerning Allegro's interpretation of the scrolls, Allegro, on the invitation of F. F. Bruce, moved from the Department of Near East Studies in the Faculty of Arts at Manchester to the Faculty of Theology. It was during his stay in Theology that he wrote his controversial book, The Sacred Mushroom and the Cross, whose subtitle was "A Study of the Nature and Origins of Christianity within the Fertility Cults of the Ancient Near East". Apparently realising the impact this book would have, Allegro resigned his post at Manchester.

== The Sacred Mushroom and Christian Myth ==
Allegro's book The Sacred Mushroom and the Cross (1970) argued that Christianity began as a shamanistic cult. In his books The Sacred Mushroom and the Cross and The Dead Sea Scrolls and the Christian Myth (1979), Allegro put forward the theory that stories of early Christianity originated in an Essene clandestine cult centred around the use of psychedelic mushrooms, and that the New Testament is the coded record of this shamanistic cult. Allegro further argued that the authors of the Christian gospels did not understand the Essene thought. When writing down the Gospels based on the stories they had heard, the evangelists confused the meaning of the scrolls. In this way, according to Allegro, the Christian tradition is based on a misunderstanding of the scrolls. He also argued that the story of Jesus was based on the crucifixion of the Teacher of Righteousness in the scrolls. Mark Hall writes that Allegro suggested the Dead Sea Scrolls all but proved that a historical Jesus never existed.

Allegro argued that Jesus in the Gospels was in fact a code for a type of hallucinogen, the Amanita muscaria, and that Christianity was the product of an ancient "sex-and-mushroom" cult. Critical reaction was swift and harsh: fourteen British scholars (including Allegro's mentor at Oxford, Godfrey Driver) denounced it. Sidnie White Crawford wrote of the publication of Sacred Mushroom, "Rightly or wrongly, Allegro would never be taken seriously as a scholar again."

Allegro's theory of a shamanistic cult as the origin of Christianity was criticised sharply by Welsh historian Philip Jenkins who wrote that Allegro was an eccentric scholar who relied on texts that did not exist in quite the form he was citing them. Jenkins called the Sacred Mushroom and the Cross "possibly the single most ludicrous book on Jesus scholarship by a qualified academic". Based on the reactions to the book, Allegro's publisher later apologized for issuing the book and Allegro was forced to resign his academic post. A 2006 article by Michael Hoffman discussing Allegro's work called for his theories to be re-evaluated by the mainstream. In November 2009 The Sacred Mushroom and the Cross was reprinted in a 40th anniversary edition with a 30-page addendum by Carl Ruck of Boston University.

== Personal life and death ==
Allegro married Joan Lawrence in 1948, by whom he had a son and a daughter. In 1982, he was living in Ballasalla on the Isle of Man before returning to live in England. In 1988, he died of a heart attack on his 65th birthday at his home in Sandbach, Cheshire. His obituarist in the Daily Telegraph, Hugh Massingberd, described him as "the Liberace of Biblical scholarship".

== Works ==
Among Allegro's works are the following:

- J.M. Allegro (1956). The Dead Sea Scrolls. Harmondsworth: Pelican.
- J.M. Allegro (1958). The People of the Dead Sea Scrolls. Garden City, NY: Doubleday & Co.
- J.M. Allegro (1960). The Treasure of the Copper Scroll. Garden City, NY: Doubleday & Co.
- J.M. Allegro (1964). Search in the Desert. Garden City NY: Doubleday & Co.
- J.M. Allegro (1965). The Shapira Affair. Garden City, NY: Doubleday & Co.
- J.M. Allegro (1968). Discoveries in the Judaean Desert of Jordan V: 4Q158–4Q186. Oxford.
- J.M. Allegro (1970). The Sacred Mushroom and the Cross. London: Hodder and Stoughton Ltd.
- J.M. Allegro (1970). The End of a Road. London: Macgibbon and Kee.
- J.M. Allegro (1971). The Chosen People. London: Hodder and Stoughton Ltd.
- J.M. Allegro (1977). Lost Gods (Dutch "Verdwenen goden"). Baarn, NL: H. Meulenhoff. ISBN 9022402525.
- J.M. Allegro (1979). The Dead Sea Scrolls and the Christian Myth. Devon: Westbridge Books. ISBN 0879752416.
- J.M. Allegro (1982). All Manner of Men. Springfield, IL: Charles Thomas.
- J.M. Allegro (1985). Physician, Heal Thyself. Amherst, United States: Prometheus Books. ISBN 9780879753054.

His scholarly journal articles include:

- J.M. Allegro (1956). "Further Messianic References in Qumran Literature". Journal of Biblical Literature. 75 (3): 174–187. doi:10.2307/3261919. JSTOR 3261919.
- J.M. Allegro (1956). "More Unpublished Pieces of a Qumran Commentary on Nahum [4Q pNah]". Journal of Biblical Literature. 75: 304–308.
- J.M. Allegro (1958). "More Isaiah Commentaries from Qumran's Fourth Cave". Journal of Biblical Literature. 77 (3): 215–221. doi:10.2307/3264101. JSTOR 3264101.
- J.M. Allegro (1958). "Fragments of a Qumran Scroll of Eschatological Midrashim". Journal of Biblical Literature. 77 (4): 350–354. doi:10.2307/3264674. JSTOR 3264674.
- J.M. Allegro (1962). "Further Light on the History of the Qumran Sect". Journal of Semitic Studies. 7: 304–308. doi:10.1093/jss/7.2.304.

An undated play 'The Lively Oracles' (with Roy Plomley).

== See also ==
- Astrotheology
- Discoveries in the Judaean Desert
