= The Sacred Mushroom and the Cross =

1970 book by John Marco Allegro

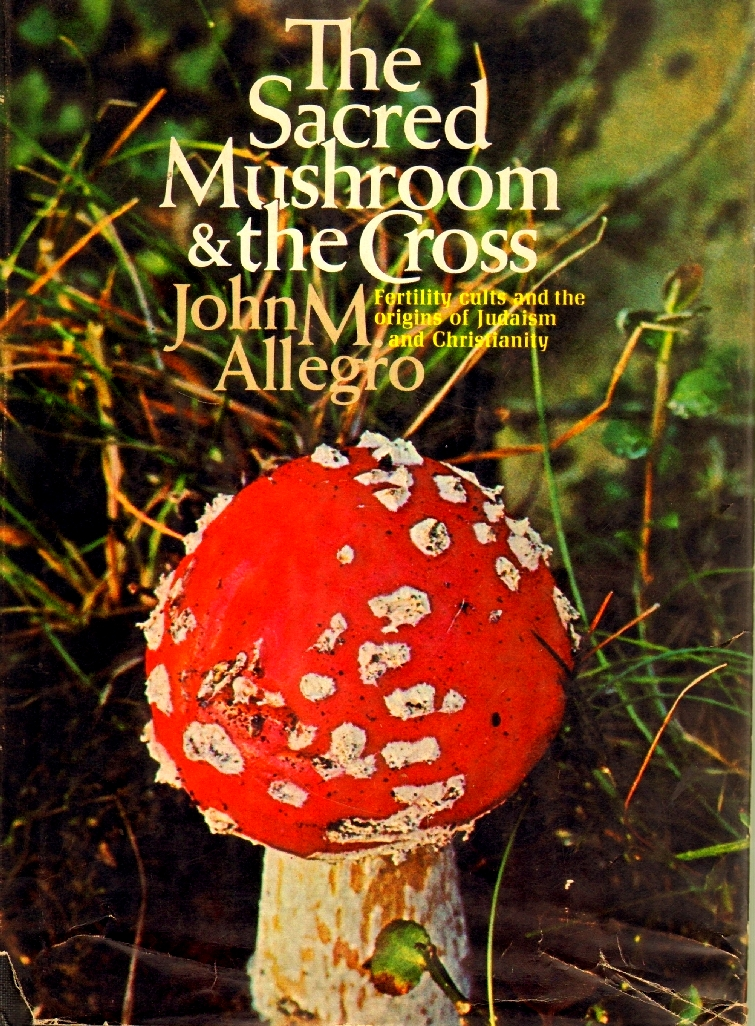
- Cover of the first edition
- Author: John M. Allegro
- Language: English
- Subject: Comparative linguistics, Fertility cults, Christianity, Ancient Near East
- Publisher: Hodder & Stoughton Ltd (UK), Doubleday (US)
- Publication date: 1970
- Publication place: United Kingdom
- Media type: Print (hardback)
- Pages: xxii, 349
- ISBN: 0-349-10065-9
- OCLC: 90427

The Sacred Mushroom and the Cross: A Study of the Nature and Origins of Christianity Within the Fertility Cults of the Ancient Near East is a 1970 monograph by philologist John Marco Allegro. Allegro proposes an etymology-driven reconstruction of biblical myth that treats Christian narratives as coded accounts of Near Eastern fertility cults that used psychoactive fungi in their rituals. The book depicts Jesus as a mythological figure rather than a historical teacher. The book sparked immediate controversy, prompted strong scholarly repudiation, and positioned the book as an enduring touchpoint in debates about psychedelics and religion.

== Contents ==
Allegro connects lexical analysis with myth formation, asserting that many biblical names and motifs encode Sumerian roots tied to fertility-cult vocabulary. He maintains that a fertility cult built around ingesting visionary plants transmitted coded language into Hebrew and Greek scripture and identifies Amanita muscaria as the emblematic sacrament. Allegro extends the argument to visual evidence such as the Plaincourault Chapel Eden fresco and concludes that the gospel Jesus functions as a cultic personification created by early Christians under the influence of psychoactive mushroom extracts including psilocybin.

His unconventional claims quickly drew ridicule. Time magazine headlined its coverage "Jesus as mushroom" and summarized scholarly response in the following terms:

To some biblical scholars in Britain, the new book looked like the psychedelic ravings of a hippie cultist. To others, it was merely an outlandish hoax. One described it as reading "like a Semitic philologist's erotic nightmare."

=== Revised Abacus edition ===
#	Chapter title	Focus	Sources Referenced
Intro	Introduction	Positions the New Testament as a cryptographic "cover story" for a mushroom-centered fertility cult decoded through Sumerian philology, naming Amanita muscaria as the sacrament.	Old Testament (Jotham's fable), general ancient Near Eastern fertility cults, his own Sumerian-based comparative philology.
1	In the Beginning God Created ...	Claims early religion personified a "heavenly penis" creator whose rain acted as divine semen and whose "seed of God" became the "Word of God".	Book of Genesis, Psalms, Book of Isaiah, Sumerian ideograms and word roots.
2	Sumer and the Beginnings of History	Presents Sumerian as the linguistic "master key" that underlies both Semitic and Indo-European languages.	Sumerian and Accadian cuneiform texts, early archaeological accounts (e.g., Sir Henry Rawlinson).
3	The Names of the Gods	Maintains that divine names such as Yahweh and Zeus derive from Sumerian terms for "spermatozoa" or "juice of fecundity".	Greek and Hebrew divine names, Gospel of John, Old Testament (I Samuel), Sumerian word roots.
4	Plants and Drugs	Links ancient medicine to guarded cult knowledge among Magi and Essenes, where drugs, astrology, and prophecy operate as inseparable arts.	Pliny's Natural History, Dioscorides' De Materia Medica, Theophrastus' Enquiry into Plants, Josephus' accounts of the Essenes, Dead Sea Scrolls (astrological text).
5	Plant Names and the Mysteries of the Fungus	Identifies Amanita muscaria as the central mystery plant and deciphers its coded folk names and epithets, including Mandrake and Paeony.	Pliny's Natural History, Book of Judges (Jotham's fable), I Kings, Sumerian, Greek, and Semitic folk-names for plants.
6	The Key of the Kingdom	Demonstrates a cryptographic punning method, treating the "stumbling-block" (skandalon) as a Semitic mushroom pun (tiqla') to decode the New Testament.	New Testament (I Corinthians, Matthew), Book of Daniel, Semitic and Greek vocabulary for puns.
7	The Man child Born of a Virgin	Interprets the virgin birth as a metaphor for the mushroom emerging unseeded from the volva "womb", presenting it as the true "Son of God".	Pliny's Natural History, New Testament (Colossians, John, Mark), Josephus' writings, Old Testament (Exodus, Job, Genesis).
8	Woman's Part in the Creative Process	Explores menstrual blood as a creative and magical substance in fertility rites, associated with the color purple and bitumen.	Pliny's Natural History, Josephus' Jewish Wars, Old Testament (Leviticus, Genesis, II Samuel), Galen's medical theories.
9	The Sacred Prostitute	Assigns the sacred prostitute the work of enticing the phallic mushroom through erotic ritual and deliberate self-exposure.	Accadian magical texts, Old Testament (Hosea, Ezekiel, Genesis), Josephus' Jewish Wars, Pliny's Natural History.
10	Religious Lamentation	Reads ritual lamentation for figures such as Tammuz and Bacchus as erotic stimulation meant to raise the phallic god or mushroom.	Greek tragedy (Euripides' Bacchae), classical authors (Athenaeus), Old Testament (Ezekiel, Isaiah, II Kings).
11	The Mushroom "Egg" and Birds of Mythology	Connects the mushroom's egg-like volva to mythic womb birds like the dove and Phoenix and reinterprets the Cherubim as mushroom guardians.	Pliny's Natural History, Book of Genesis, Book of Ezekiel, classical myths (Phoenix), New Testament (Matthew - Jesus's baptism).
12	The Heavenly Twins	Explains twin myths such as Castor and Pollux and Cain and Abel through the split volva and emergent stem, tying the image to the cross.	Old Testament (Genesis, II Samuel), New Testament (Mark, Luke), classical myths (Dioscouroi), Pliny's Natural History.
13	Star of the Morning	Links the mushroom to the Morning Star (Venus), proposing that "genital dew" carried its creative power and inspired the origin of Manna.	Old Testament (Isaiah, Numbers, Jonah), New Testament (Revelation, Mark, John), Pliny's Natural History, Homeric Hymns.
14	Colour and Consistency	Traces names drawn from the red and white cap of Amanita muscaria to myths like the Golden Fleece, the "Panther" epithet for Jesus, and coded figures such as Barnabas.	Classical myths (Jason and the Golden Fleece), Old Testament (Genesis, II Kings), Pliny's Natural History, Jewish Talmud, New Testament (Acts, John).
15	Mushroom Cosmography	Proposes a cosmography in which the universe resembles a mushroom with heaven as the canopy and sacred mountains such as Olympus or Zion as the stem.	Accadian creation myths, Old Testament (Genesis, Exodus, II Samuel), Pliny's Natural History, Josephus' writings.
16	David, Egypt, and the Census	Interprets the Israelite stay in Egypt as wordplay between a Semitic mushroom name (Mezar) and the term for Egypt (Masor).	Old Testament (II Samuel, Isaiah, Genesis, Judges, Exodus), New Testament (Matthew, Luke, Acts).
17	Death and Resurrection	Parallels the death and resurrection cycle with the mushroom's rapid life span and the mystic's drug-induced experience of death and rebirth.	Josephus' writings, classical myths (Persephone, Dioscouroi), New Testament (Romans, I Corinthians, Ephesians, John), Gnostic writings (briefly), Pliny's Natural History.
18	The Garden of Adonis, Eden and Delight, Zealots and Muslims	Treats the "Garden of Eden" as a mistranslated Sumerian mushroom name (GAN-NA'IMAN) and links the term to the Zealots and early Muslims.	Old Testament (Ezekiel, Isaiah), Josephus' Jewish Wars, the Qur'an, New Testament (I Peter).
19	The Bible as a Book of Morals	Concludes that the Bible's moral teachings, including the Ten Commandments, stem from wordplay on Sumerian mushroom names.	Old Testament (Exodus), Code of Hammurabi, Roman historians (Tacitus, Suetonius), New Testament (Matthew, Mark, II Peter, Revelation).

== Reception ==
The Sacred Mushroom and the Cross provoked immediate and sustained controversy after its 1970 publication. Scholars widely rejected Allegro's philological methods and conclusions, yet the book attracted popular fascination and quickly became one of the most notorious works in biblical scholarship.

=== Contemporary response in 1970 ===
Within weeks of publication fifteen British philologists and theologians wrote to The Times calling the book "an essay in fantasy rather than philology" and asserting that it lacked philological or evidentiary merit. Time echoed the criticism, saying the volume read "like a Semitic philologist's erotic nightmare". Press coverage described a media storm. Allegro resigned his Manchester faculty post during the controversy, and his United Kingdom publisher issued a public apology for releasing the book.

=== Scholarly assessment ===
Religious studies scholar Philip Jenkins labeled the book "possibly the single most ludicrous book on Jesus scholarship by a qualified academic". Biblical archaeologist Joan E. Taylor considered it among the strangest modern works on religion and pharmacology connected to the Dead Sea Scrolls. Religious historian Judith Anne Brown observed that Allegro followed cross-cultural clues and layered associations that made the argument difficult to summarize. Dead Sea Scrolls scholars Peter W. Flint and James C. VanderKam cited the episode as an illustration of sensationalism surrounding Qumran studies.

== Suppression conspiracy ==
A popular conspiracy theory claims that church authorities, often identified as the Catholic Church, bought or removed copies of The Sacred Mushroom and the Cross to silence its argument. The rumor attempts to explain periods when the book was scarce, yet published evaluations report no documentary evidence that ecclesiastical bodies acquired rights or copies.

The historical record contradicts claims of permanent suppression. The book faced strong backlash and a publisher apology yet remained available through numerous editions and reprints. Allegro's own website lists the original Hodder & Stoughton London edition (1970), Doubleday's first United States edition (1970), Abacus and Bantam paperbacks from 1970, the Paper Jacks Canadian release (1971), and translations into French (Le Champignon sacré et la Croix, Albin Michel, 1971), German (Der Geheimkult des heiligen Pilzes, Fritz Molden), Italian (Il Fungo Sacro e la Croce, Cesco Ciapanna, 1980), and Dutch (De Heilige Paddestoel en het Kruis, W. de Haan, 1971). A 40th anniversary edition appeared in 2009, and the work remains in print.

The suppression story gained renewed attention through podcasts and social media. Joe Rogan has repeatedly told audiences that the Catholic Church bought the book and removed it from circulation while promoting Allegro's thesis with multiple guests. Academic discussions of Allegro's popular afterlife note Rogan's role in reviving interest without endorsing the suppression claim.

Researchers attribute the book's brief disappearance from mainstream circulation in the early 1970s to hostile academic reception and publisher caution rather than clerical intervention. Don Lattin observes that Hodder & Stoughton issued a public apology and Allegro resigned his university post, yet the title soon returned in paperback editions and later reprints.

== Legacy and reconsideration ==
The book debuted in the United Kingdom with Hodder & Stoughton in 1970. Doubleday issued the first United States edition that same year, totaling xxii plus 349 pages. A revised Abacus paperback followed in 1973, omitting the original notes and appendices and adding a new preface. A 2009 40th-anniversary reprint included a thirty-page addendum by Carl A. P. Ruck.

The 2009 anniversary edition reintroduced Allegro's thesis to new readers. Debates about entheogens in Christian art and ritual continue to cite Allegro as an antecedent, disputing his philology while revisiting iconographic claims such as the Plaincourault fresco.

== See also ==
- Healers of the Dead Sea
- Historicity of Jesus
- The Passover Plot
- Stoned ape theory
- Lenin was a mushroom
