= Moses Margolies =

Moses Margolies or Moshe ben Shimon Margalit (Hebrew: משה מרגלית; c. 1710 in Kėdainiai, Lithuania – 1781 in Brody, then a private town of the Polish Crown) was a Lithuanian Jewish rabbi and a commentator on the Jerusalem Talmud.

== Biography ==
Margolies was born in Kėdainiai, Lithuania, to his father Rabbi Shimon Margalit. While studying there, he taught the Vilna Gaon, who had spent about three months in the city during his childhood. He later went on to be appointed as the rabbi of Kėdainiai.

He traveled through the cities of Europe in order to obtain manuscripts and acquire practical knowledge for the writing of his commentary. At the age of seventy, he enrolled in the botany course at the University of Brandenburg (Frankfurt an der Oder) in order to improve his understanding of Zeraim and to acquire the appropriate knowledge for his commentary on that Order.

While in Amsterdam, he succeeded in printing his commentary on the Order of Nashim. In the year 1770 he was in Livorno, where he printed his commentary on the Order of Nezikin with the assistance of local wealthy patrons. His commentary on the Order of Zeraim and Moed he did not manage to print, but they were printed in the Zhitomir edition of the Jerusalem Talmud of 1860 and 1867. He had intended to immigrate to the Land of Israel, but did not manage to do so, and passed away during his wanderings in Brody.

== Works ==
Margolies is best known as the author of a dual commentary on the Jerusalem Talmud, which is printed in the standard Vilna and Szatmár editions of the text. His general glosses, which he called by the name of Pnei Moshe (the face of Moses), was intended to make the often choppy text of the Jerusalem Talmud easier to read. His second commentary, which he called Mareh Panim (showing of face), is meant to take up more complex legal issues and often surveys the Babylonian Talmud and the corpus of post-Talmudic law and commentary as well. This format of two commentaries, simple and complex, was meant to mimic the Rashi and Tosafot commentaries on the Babylonian Talmud. This style became popular among commentators on the Jerusalem Talmud and is used by Margolies' contemporary, Rabbi David Fränkel as well as by Rabbi Jacob David Wilovsky, among others.
