= Human interactions with fungi =

Overview of human–fungi interactions

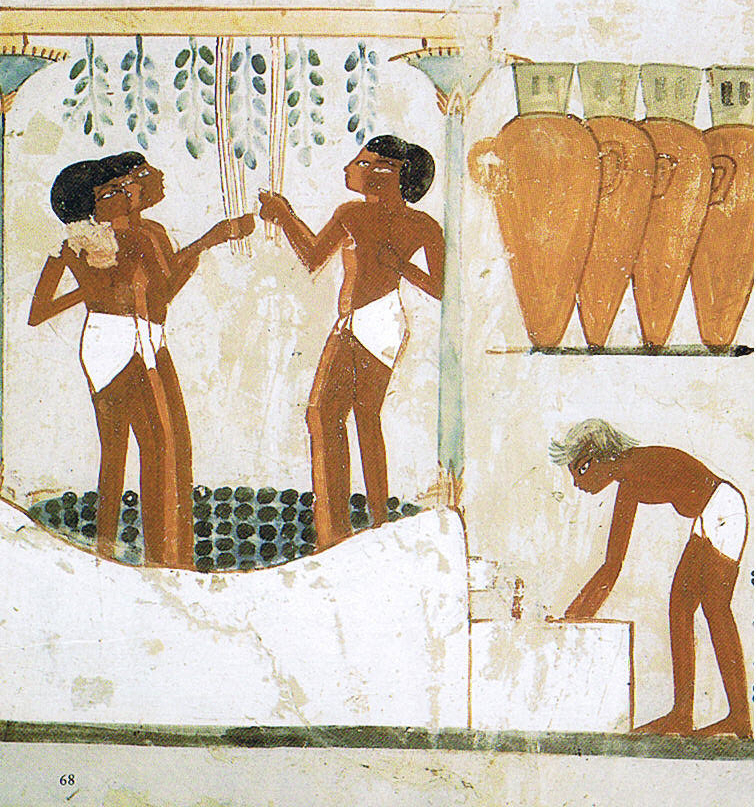
Wine has been made using grapes and natural yeast since ancient times. Tomb of Nakht, 18th dynasty, Thebes, Ancient Egypt

Human interactions with fungi include both beneficial uses, whether practical or symbolic, and harmful interactions such as when fungi damage crops, timber, food, or are pathogenic to animals.

Yeasts have been used since ancient times to leaven bread and to ferment beer and wine. More recently, mould fungi have been exploited to create a wide range of industrial products, including enzymes and drugs. Medicines based on fungi include antibiotics, immunosuppressants, statins and many anti-cancer drugs. The yeast species Saccharomyces cerevisiae is an important model organism in cell biology. The fruiting bodies of some larger fungi are collected as edible mushrooms, including delicacies like the chanterelle, cep, and truffle, while a few species are cultivated. Mould fungi provide the meaty (umami) flavour of fermented soybean products such as tempeh, miso and soy sauce, and contribute flavour and colour to blue cheeses including Roquefort and Stilton. Moulds also yield vegetarian meat substitutes like Quorn. Some fungi, especially the fly agaric and psilocybin mushrooms are used for the psychoactive drugs that they contain; these in particular are the focus of academic study in the field of ethnomycology. Fungi have appeared, too, from time to time, in literature and art.

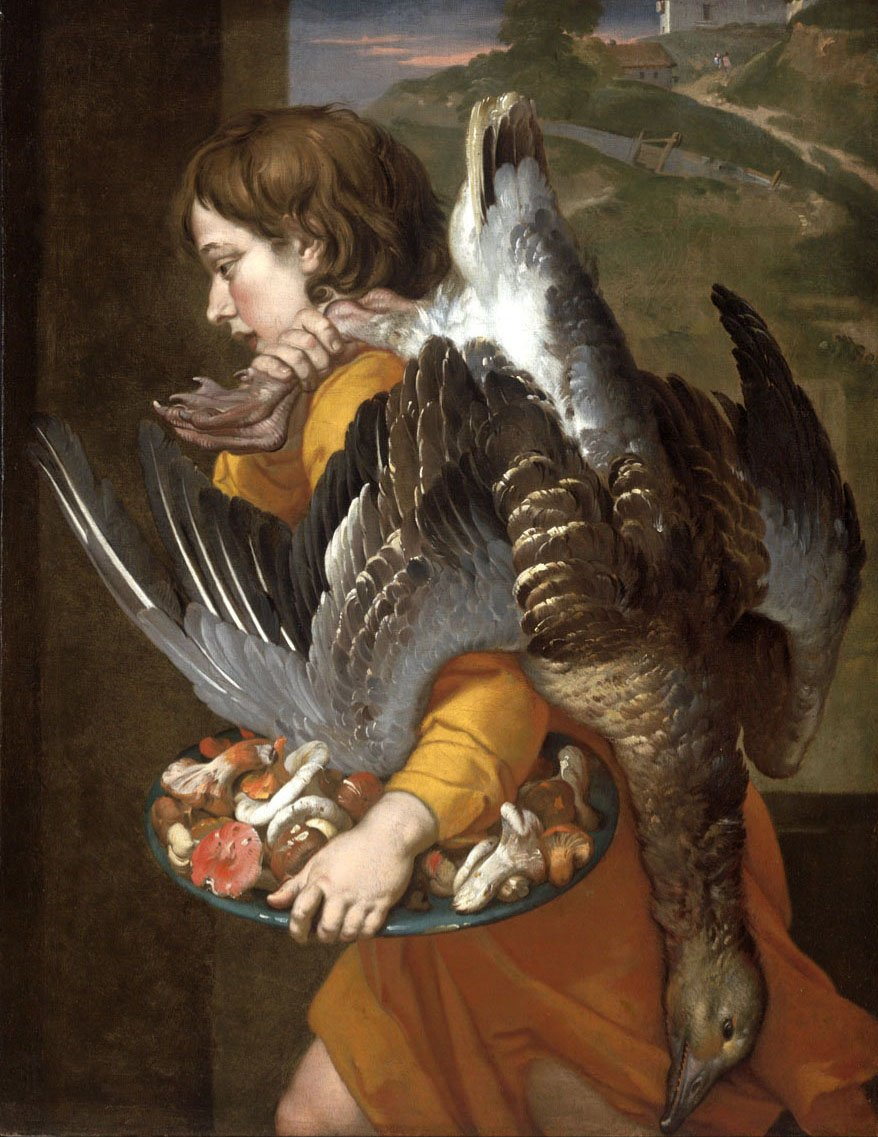
Boy with a goose on his back and a plate with mushrooms in his side by Jacob van Oost

Fungi create harm by spoiling food, destroying timber, and by causing diseases of crops, livestock, and humans. Fungi, mainly moulds like Penicillium and Aspergillus, spoil many stored foods. Fungi cause the majority of plant diseases, which in turn cause serious economic losses. Sometimes, as in the Great Irish Famine of 1845–1849, fungal diseases of plants, in this case potato blight caused by Phytophthora, result in large-scale human suffering. Fungi are similarly the main cause of economic losses of timber in buildings. Finally, fungi cause many diseases of humans and livestock; Aspergillosis kills some 600,000 people a year, mainly however those with already weakened immune systems.

== Context ==
Culture consists of the social behaviour and norms found in human societies and transmitted through social learning. Cultural universals in all human societies include expressive forms like art, music, dance, ritual, religion, and technologies like tool usage, cooking, shelter, and clothing. The concept of material culture covers physical expressions such as technology, architecture and art, whereas immaterial culture includes principles of social organization, mythology, philosophy, literature, and science. This article describes the roles played by fungi in human culture.

== Practical uses ==
=== Fermentation ===
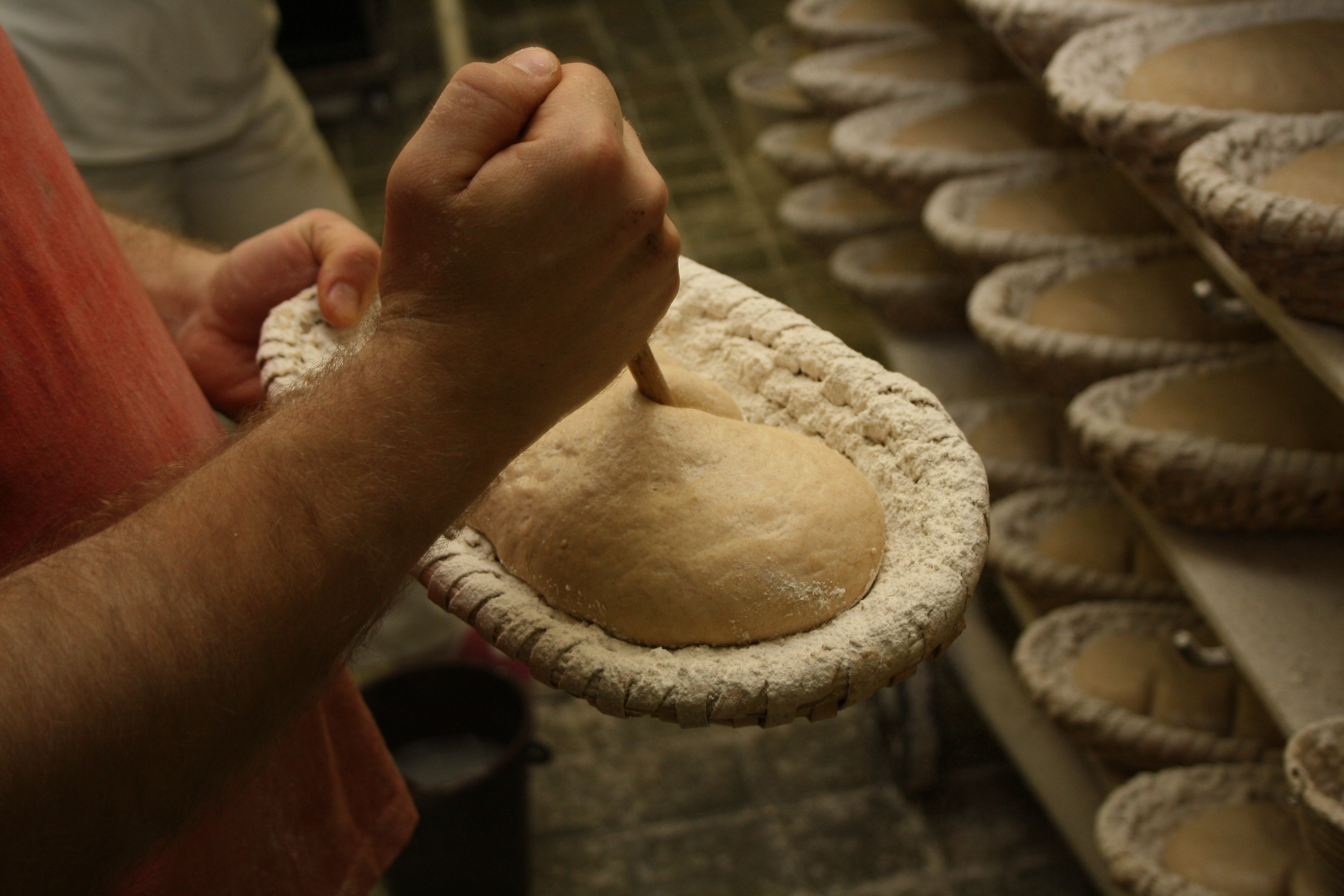
Bread dough leavened with yeast

Yeasts have been used since ancient times to leaven bread and to ferment beer and wine. More recently, fungi have been used for a wide variety of industrial fermentations, whether working directly for their effects on materials such as processing paper pulp or bioremediating industrial waste, or serving as the source of enzymes for many purposes, such as fading and softening denim for fashionable blue jeans. Fungi yield a wide variety of industrial enzymes including amylases, invertases, cellulases and hemicellulases, pectinases, proteases, laccases, phytases, alpha-glucuronidases, mannanases, and lipases.

=== Mushroom ===
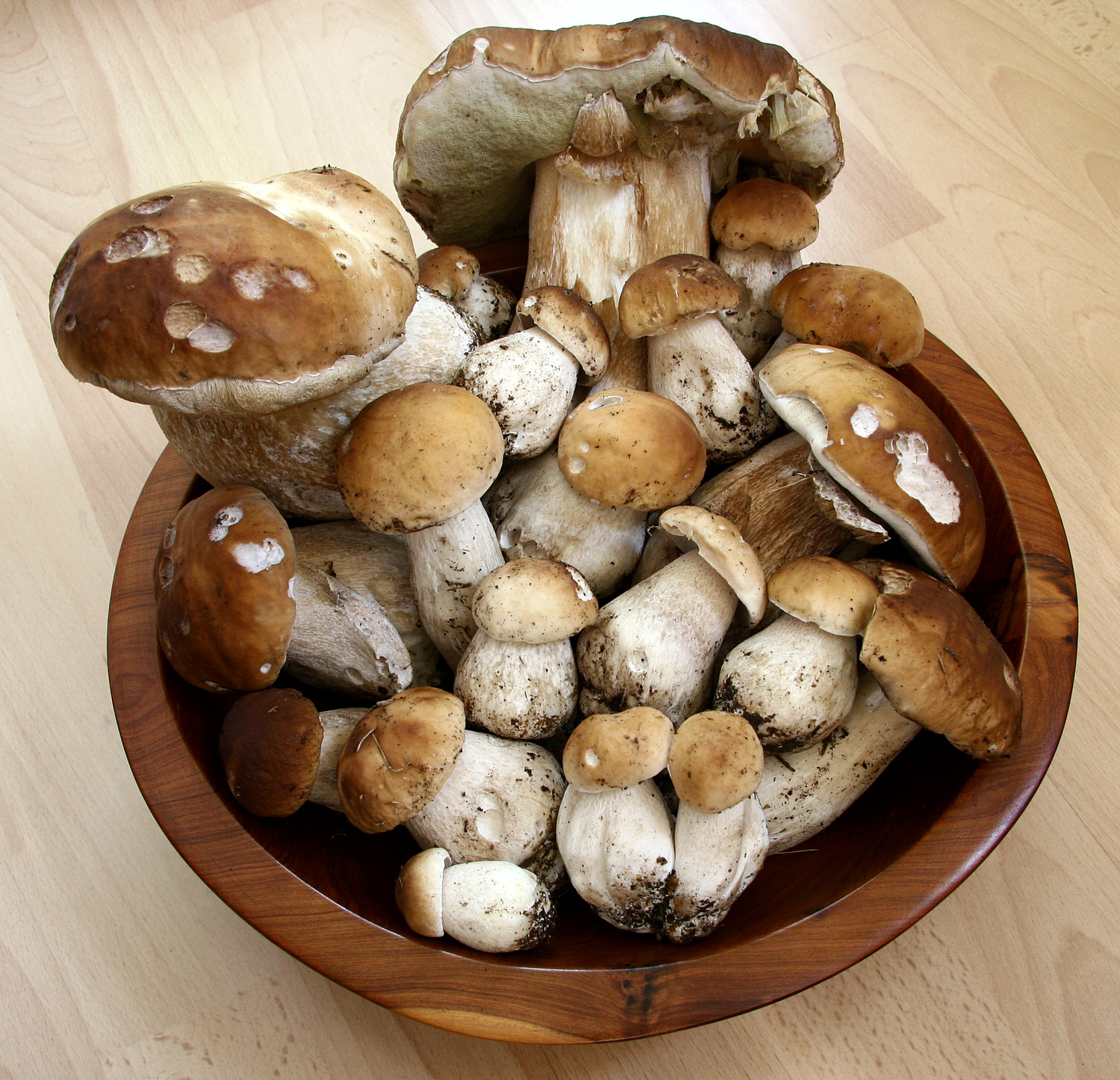
Penny bun or cep mushrooms collected from the wild

The fruiting bodies of many larger fungi such as the chanterelle and the cep are collected as edible mushrooms. Some, such as truffles, are esteemed as costly delicacies. A few species such as Agaricus bisporus and oyster mushrooms (Pleurotus spp.) are cultivated.

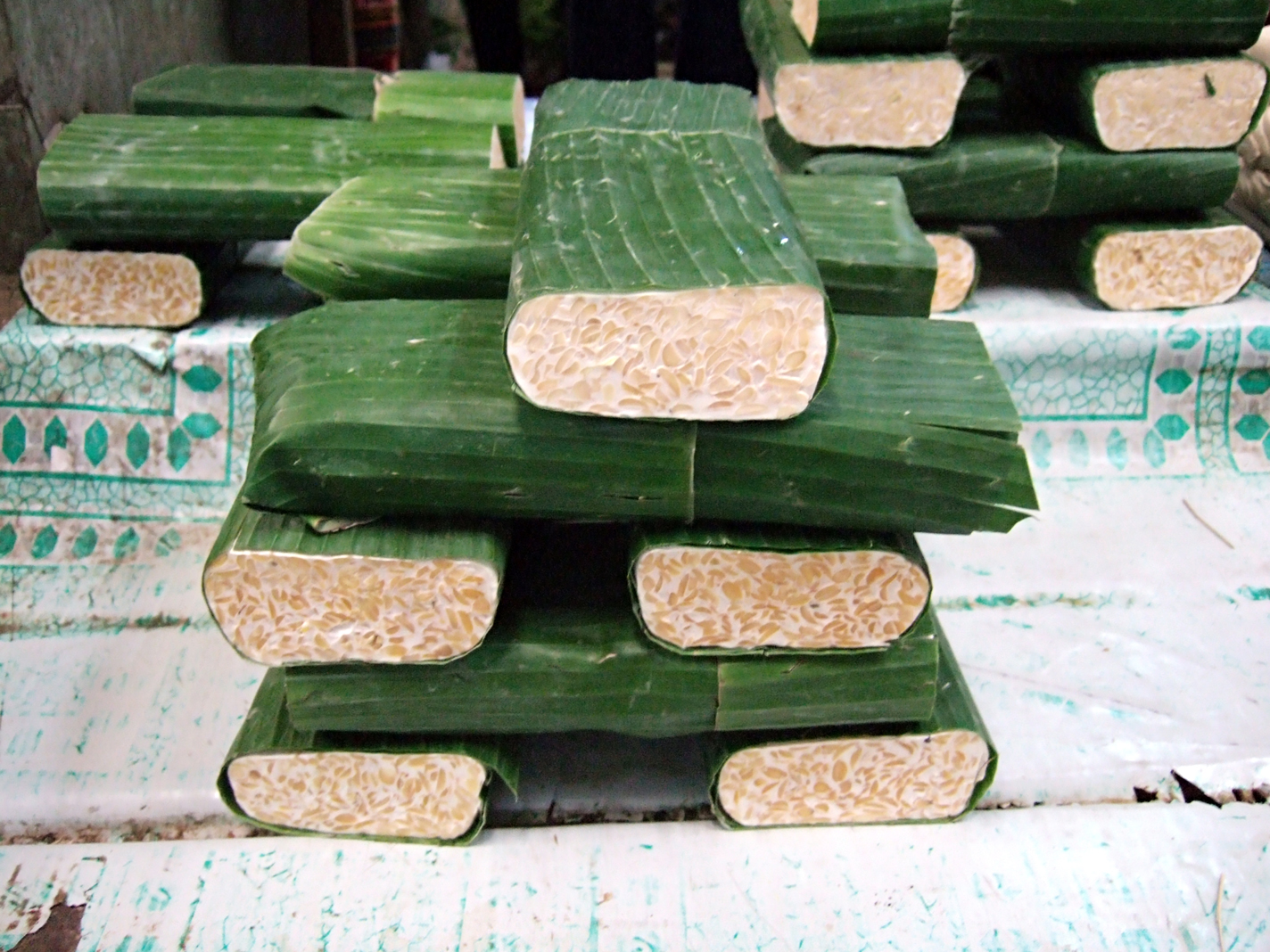
Mould fungi produce foods like tempeh, savoury Javanese fermented soybean cakes.

Mould fungi are the source of the meaty (umami) flavour of the soybean products tempeh, miso and soy sauce. Tempeh has been produced in Java since the 13th century. Like tofu, it is made into protein-rich blocks, but these have a firm texture and earthy flavour, since (unlike tofu) the whole beans are retained, providing a higher content of dietary fibre and vitamins. Miso too is rich in protein, vitamins and minerals. It is fermented from a mixture of soybeans and cereals, forming a soft paste used to flavour soups and other Japanese dishes. Soy sauce has been used in China since the 2nd century AD, and is now widespread in Asia. Like miso, it is made by fermenting a mixture of soybeans and cereals with moulds such as Aspergillus oryzae.

The mould Penicillium roqueforti contributes the blue coloration and much of the flavour in blue cheeses such as Roquefort and Stilton. Mould fungi are processed to produce vegetarian meat substitutes such as Quorn.

=== Dyes ===
Fungi are used as natural dyes. The mushrooms are crushed and placed in a non-reactive pot to simmer for as long as desired or until you achieve a desired depth of color. Mushrooms that can be used without a mordant (metallic salts) are called "substantive dyes", but in order to improve color and light fastness a mordant can be used. Protein fibers, like wool and silk, quickly take the dye, but cotton, hemp and some synthetic fibers can be used too.

=== In modern medicine ===
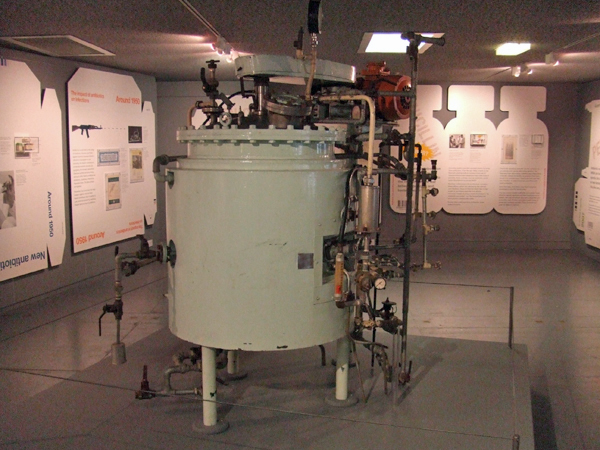
An early industrial penicillin bioreactor, from 1957

Fungi are the sources of many types of medicinal drug including antibiotics, immunosuppressants, and statins. Major classes of antibiotics, the penicillins and the cephalosporins, are derived from substances produced by fungi. So also are the immunosuppressant macrolides, the cyclosporins.

The cholesterol-lowering drugs, the statins, were initially produced by fungi including Penicillium. The first commercial statin, lovastatin, was fermented by the mould Aspergillus terreus.

Numerous anti-cancer drugs such as the mitotic inhibitors vinblastine, vincristine, podophyllotoxin, griseofulvin, aurantiamine, oxaline, and neoxaline are produced by fungi.

=== In folk medicine ===
Many fungi have been used as folk medicines around the world, including in Europe and in India where traditions are well documented. Some have been found to have useful active ingredients, though these do not always correspond with traditional uses of the fungi concerned. Ergot and various cereal smuts, such as Ustilago tritici (wheat grain smut) were used for disorders of pregnancy. Yeasts, made into a boiled paste with wheat flour, were used in India to treat fevers and dysentery. Wounds were treated in Europe with moulds, using for example a slice of mouldy bread or mouldy wheat straw, with active ingredients patulin and other penicillin-like compounds. In East Africa, pre-colonial practice of craniotomy involved the use of fungi to prevent the onset of sepsis.

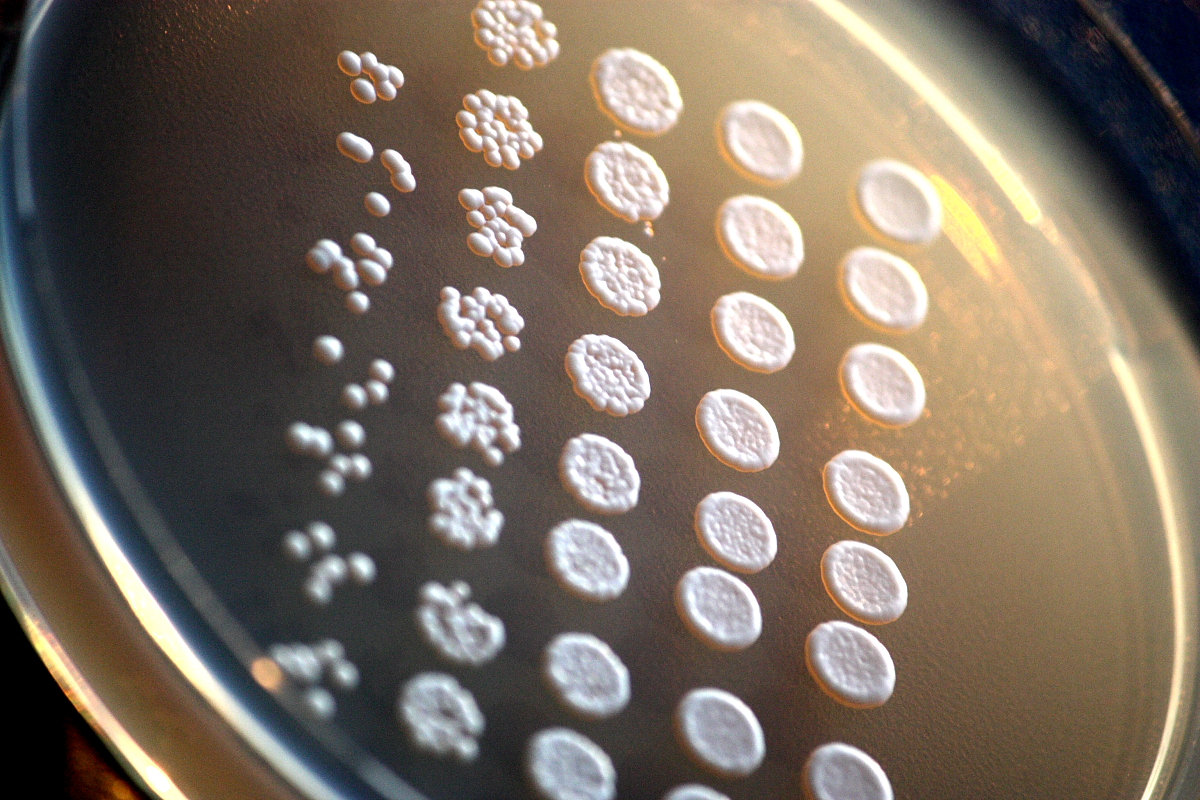
Yeast colonies on an agar plate. This "frogging" assay compares the viability of different yeast mutants.

=== In science, research and technology ===
The yeast species Saccharomyces cerevisiae has been an important model organism in modern cell biology for much of the twentieth century, and is one of the most thoroughly researched eukaryotic microorganisms. It was the first eukaryote whose genome was sequenced. In the twenty-first century, the filamentous mould Aspergillus has been adopted for genome studies.

=== As biomaterial ===
Fungi have been used a biomaterial since many centuries, for example as fungus-based textiles. An early example of such "mycotextiles" comes from the early 20th century: a wall pocket originating from the Tlingit, an Indigenous Population from the Pacific Northwest (US) and displayed as historical artefact at the Dartmouth College's Hood Museum of Art, turned out to be made of mycelium from the tree-decaying agarikon fungus. Fungal mycelia are used as leather-like material (also known as pleather, artificial leather, or synthetic leather), including for high-end fashion design products.

Beside their use in clothing, fungus-based biomaterials are used in packaging and construction. There are several advantages and potentials of using fungus-based materials rather than commonly used ones. These include the smaller environmental impact compared with the use of animal products; vertical farming, able to decrease land use; the thread-like growth of mycelium, able to be molded into desirable shapes; use of growth substrate derived from agricultural wastes and the recycling of mycelium within the principles of circular economy; and mycelium as self-repairing structures.

A patent study covering 2009-2018 highlighted the current patent landscape around mycelial materials based on patents filed or pending. In 2018, 47 patents involving fungal materials in packaging, textile, leather, automotive, thermal insulation or as fire protection material were filed. In 2018, most patents are filed in the U.S. (28 patents), followed by China (14 patents) and the rest in other countries (5 patents). Most fungi used are basidiomycetes including species such as Agrocybe aegerita, Coprinus comatus, Pleurotus ostreatus, and Lentinula edodes (in the order Agaricales) and Fomes fomentarius, Ganoderma lucidum, and Trametes versicolor (in the order Polyporales); and only a few are ascomycetes, mainly species in the order Xylaria.

=== In pest control ===
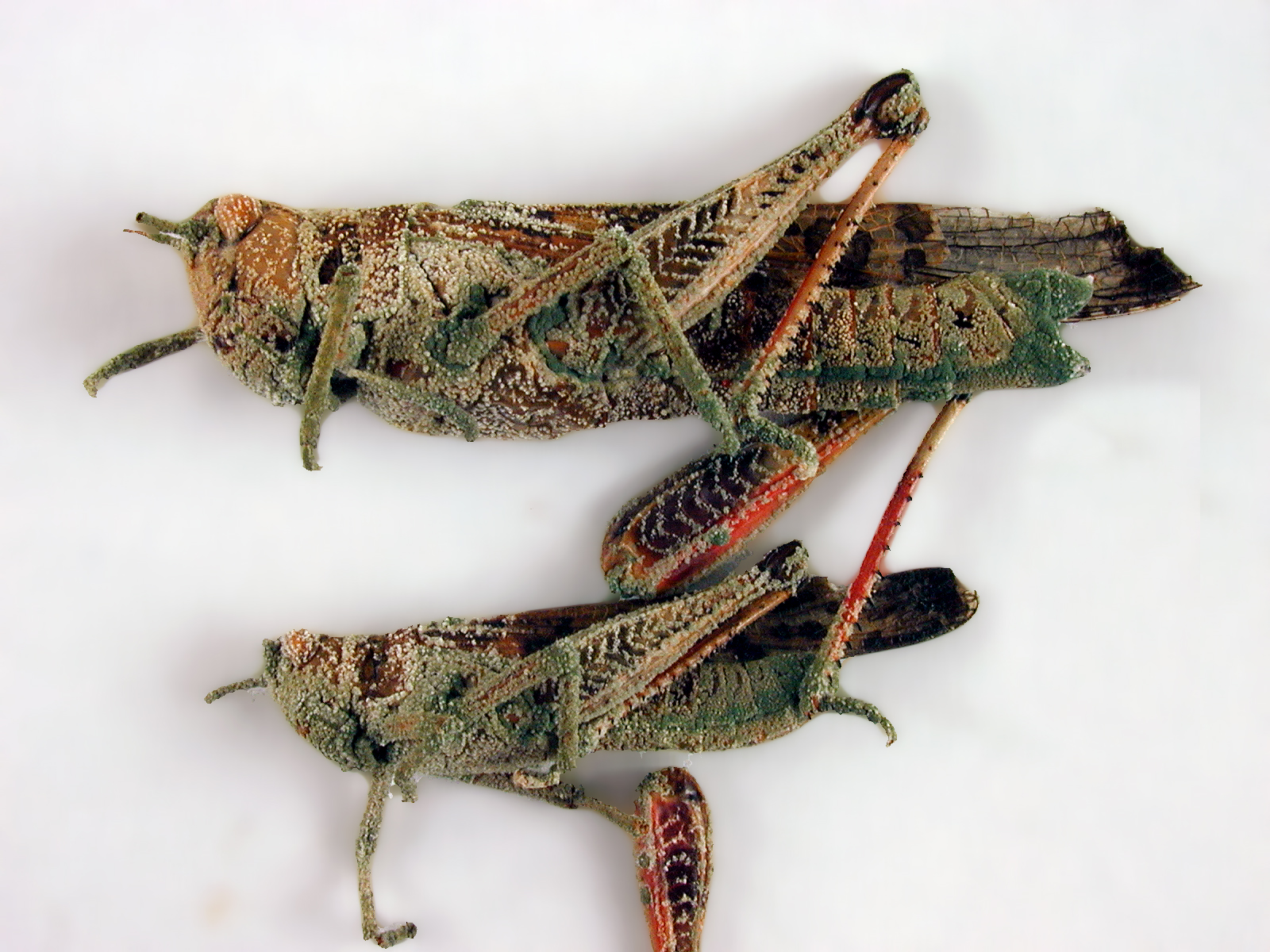
Locusts killed by the naturally occurring fungus Metarhizium, an environmentally friendly means of biological control. CSIRO, 2005

Entomopathogenic fungi infect and kill insects, including a variety of pest species, so they have been investigated as possible biological control agents. A variety of Ascomycetes, including Beauveria, Lecanicillium, Metarhizium, and Paecilomyces have promising features for use as biological insecticides. Metarhizium in particular can help to control outbreaks of locusts.

== Symbolic uses ==
=== In religion and witchcraft ===
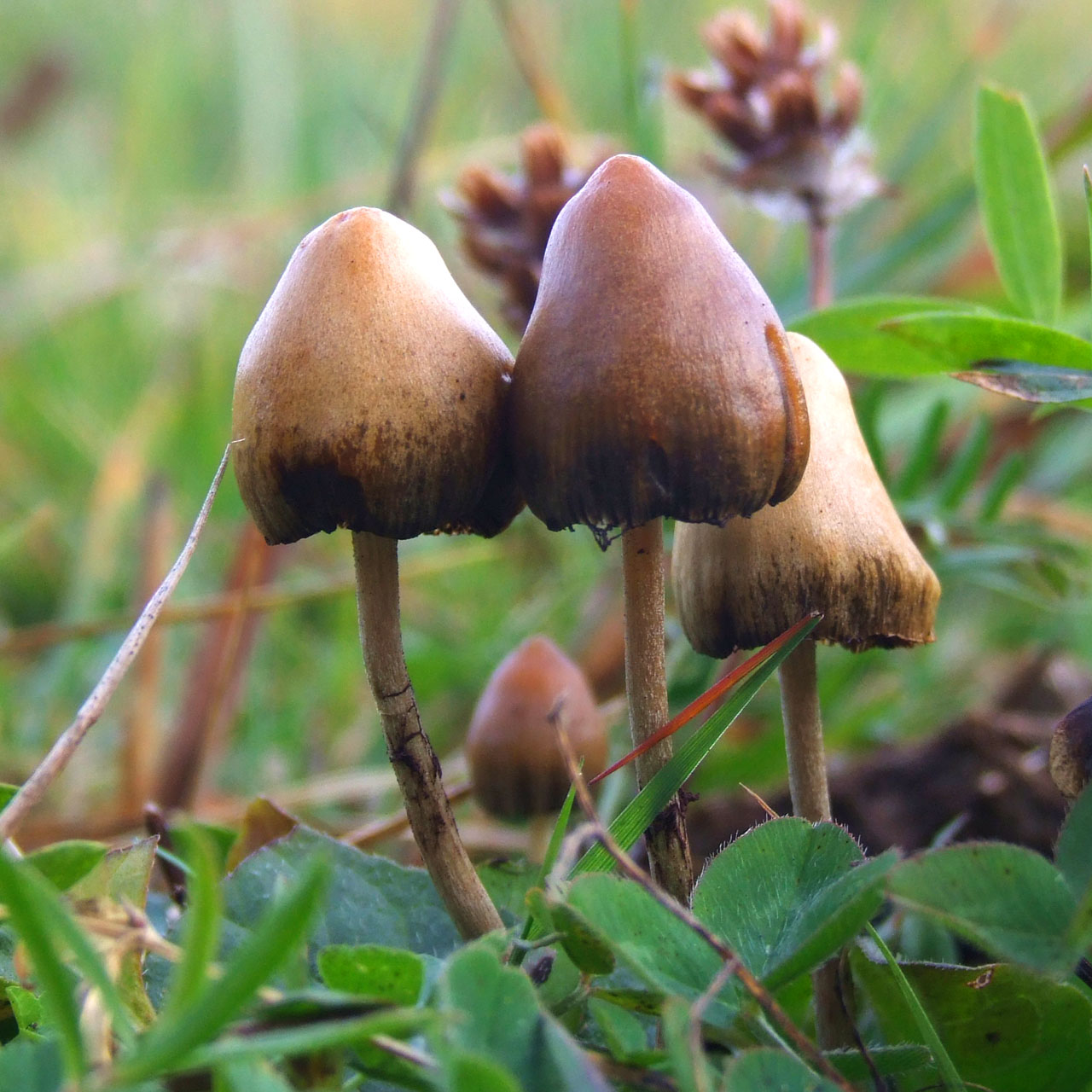
The liberty cap mushroom Psilocybe semilanceata is gathered for its psychoactive effects.

Some species such as the fly agaric and psilocybin mushrooms are used for the psychoactive drugs that they contain. These are the focus of academic study and intense debate in the field of ethnomycology. In the 1950s, the American banker Robert Gordon Wasson participated in a Mazatec psilocybin mushroom ritual, and wrote an influential but controversial book claiming that the Soma mentioned in the Rigveda was Amanita muscaria, the fly agaric. (Note: Michael Hoffman wrote: Wasson neglects to address the relevant question of whether the tree of life at the end of the Bible meant Amanita mushrooms. He asserts that the tree of life in Genesis meant Amanita, while implying that the tree of life in Revelation did not mean Amanita – an unlikely combination of ideas, which he fails to address and justify.) The mycologist John Ramsbottom however confirmed one element that Allegro later wove into his theory, stating in 1953 that the tree of the knowledge of good and evil fresco (Note: The Plaincourault Chapel fresco of the tree of the knowledge of good and evil has been photographed in detail on Flickr by Giorgio Samorini.) in the Plaincourault Chapel depicted Amanita muscaria. (Note: Ramsbottom wrote: "The Fly-Agaric is one of the easiest fungi to recognise and to describe. Consequently its poisonous properties were early known ... In a fresco in a ruined chapel at Plaincourault (Indre, France), dating from 1291, a branched specimen is painted to represent the tree of good and evil (Pl. Ib, pg. 34). Presumably it was the artist's conception of the essence of evil made more terrible by enlargement and proliferation. The serpent is shown winding round the stem, offering the traditional apple to Eve, who, apparently having eaten of the 'tree', is shown in an attitude which suggests that she is 'suffering from colic rather than from shame'.")

The ergot fungi whose sclerotia appear as "black grain" in rye and other cereals are implicated in the witch trials of 17th century Norway, where the hallucinations caused by ergotism, with visions of Satan as a black dog or cat, caused people to be accused of witchcraft. People in other cultures such as the Aztecs brewed drinks with ergot, which contains alkaloids based on lysergic acid.

=== In literature and art ===
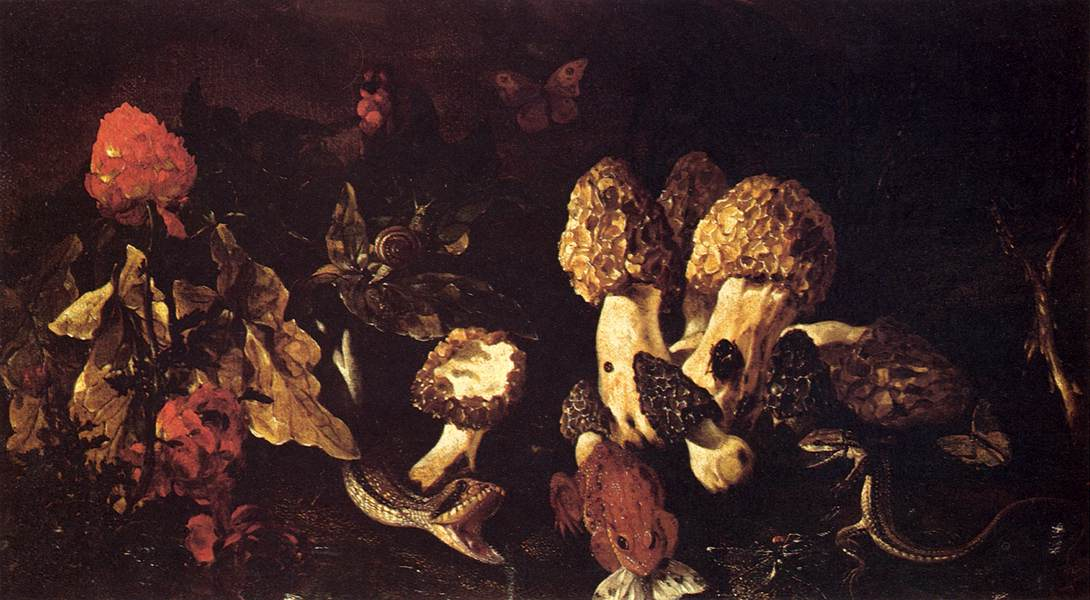
Still-Life with Fungi by Paolo Porpora, c. 1655

Fungi have had an enormous influence in the arts since centuries. Fungi appeared from time to time in literature, both for children and for adults. In Lewis Carroll's 1865 Alice's Adventures in Wonderland, Alice grows larger if she eats one side of the mushroom, and shrinks if she eats from the other side. Shakespeare has Prospero remark in The Tempest that elves "make midnight mushrooms".

Poems and novels about or mentioning fungi have been written by Edmund Spenser, Percy Bysshe Shelley, Keats, Tennyson, Arthur Conan Doyle, D. H. Lawrence, and Emily Dickinson. Tennyson referred to the fairy ring mushroom (Marasmius) with the phrase "the fairy footings on the grass".

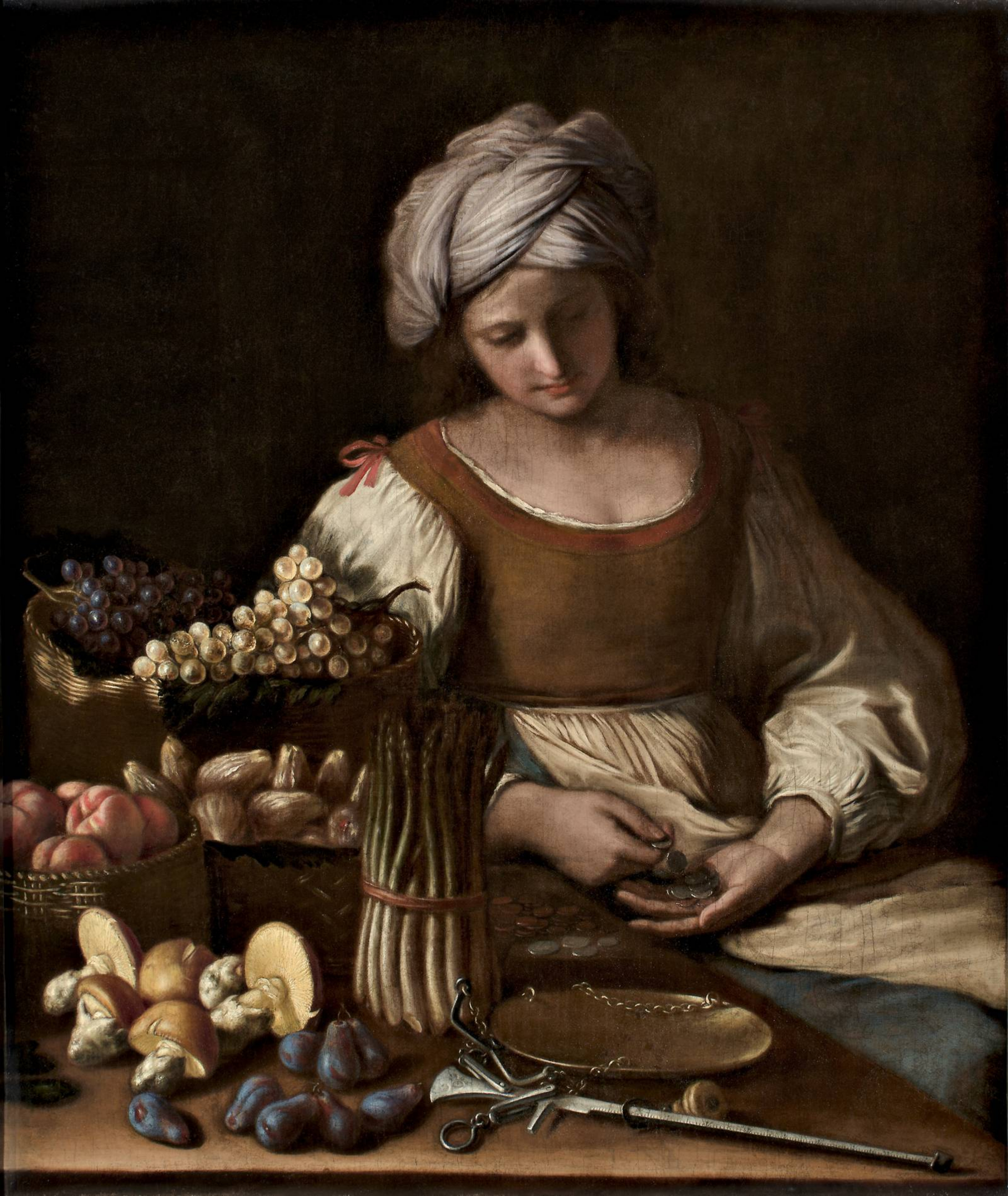
Greengrocer by Guercino and Paolo Antonio Barbieri, c. 1645

Fungi feature in works of art throughout the centuries, including in still lifes by specialists such as Paolo Porpora, Jan Fijt, Abraham Mignon and Otto Marseus van Schrieck as well as in other works such as the Greengrocer by Guercino and Paolo Antonio Barbieri (c. 1645) and the Boy with a goose on his back and a plate with mushrooms in his side by Jacob van Oost (between 1640 and 1671). The children's author Beatrix Potter painted hundreds of accurate watercolour illustrations of fungi. More recently, artists such as Martin Belou, Helen Downie (alias "Unskilled Worker"), and Steffen Dam have created installations and paintings of mushrooms.

== Harmful interactions ==
=== Food spoilage ===
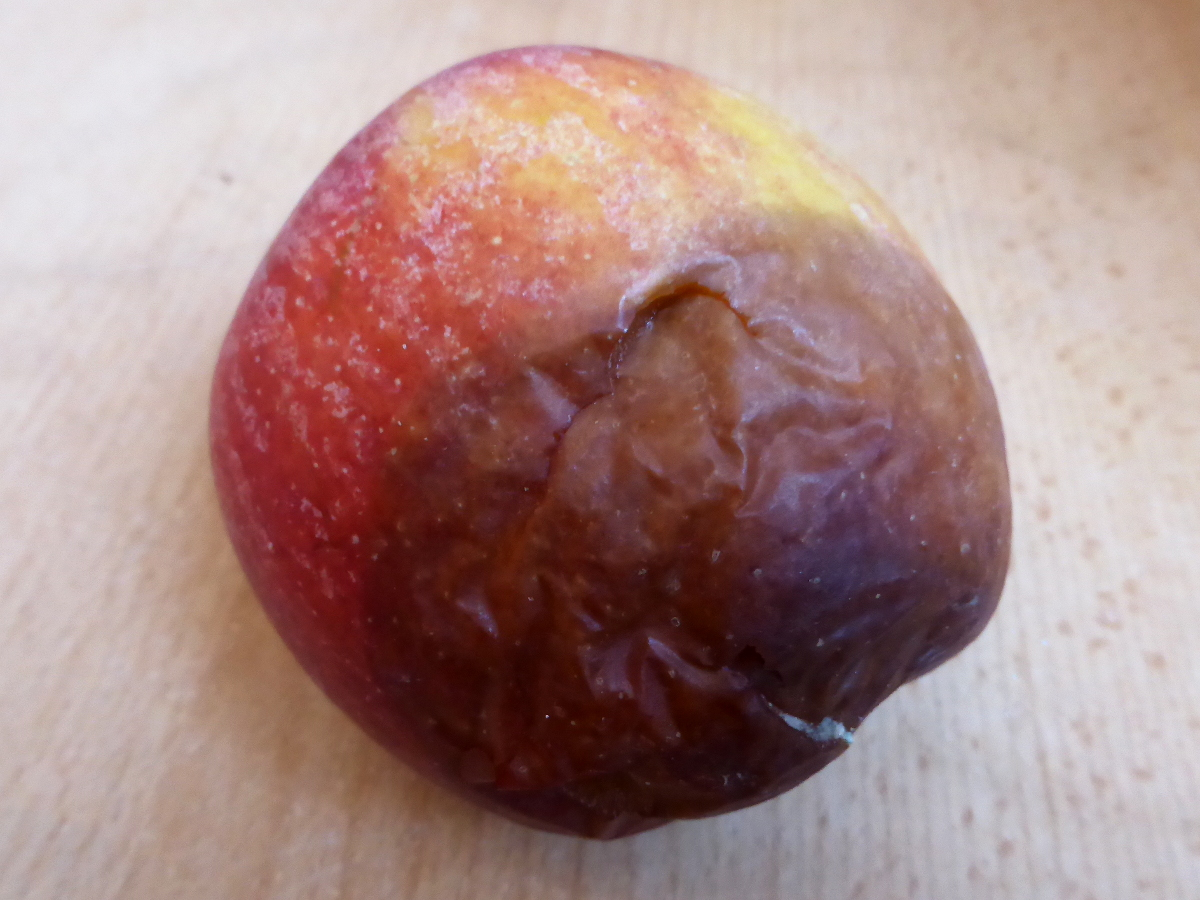
An apple spoiled by a soft Penicillium type fungal rot

Fungi, especially moulds but also yeasts, are important agents of food spoilage. Penicillium moulds cause soft rot such as of apples, while Aspergillus moulds create patches on the surface of old bread, yoghurt and many other foods. Yeasts spoil sugary foods such as plums and jams, fermenting the sugars to alcohol. Scientific understanding of spoilage began in the 19th century with works such as Louis Pasteur's 1879 Studies on Fermentation, which investigated the spoilage of beer.

=== Destruction of timber ===
Saprotrophic wood-decay fungi are the primary cause of decomposition of wood, causing billions of dollars of economic damage each year. Fungal decay, while useful in composting, is destructive of timber exposed to the weather, and in the case of dry rot caused by Serpula lacrymans, also of timbers in largely dry houses. Some wood-decay fungi such as the honey fungi, species of Armillaria, are parasites of living trees, attacking their roots and eventually killing them, and continuing to decompose the wood when they are dead. Honey fungus is a serious horticultural pest, as it can spread from tree to tree by long strap-shaped rhizomorphs in the soil.

=== Diseases of crops ===
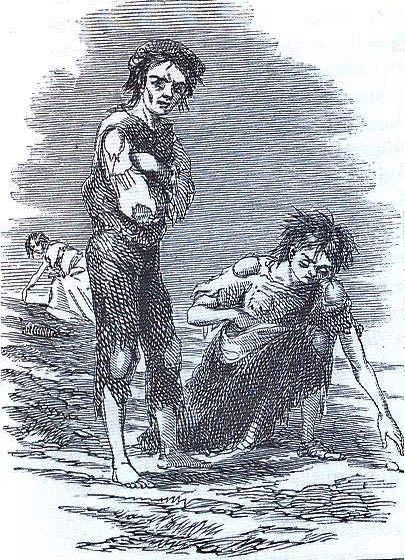
The Great Irish Famine of 1845–1849, caused by potato blight. Skibbereen engraving by James Mahony, 1847

Fungi are important crop pathogens, as they reproduce rapidly, affect a wide range of crops around the world, cause some 85% of plant diseases, and can create serious economic losses. The range of types of fungi involved is also wide, including Ascomycetes such as Fusarium causing wilt, Basidiomycetes such as Ustilago causing smuts and Puccinia causing cereal rusts, and Oomycetes such as Phytophthora causing potato late blight and the resulting Great Irish Famine of 1845–1849. Where crop diversity is low, and in particular where single varieties of major crops are nearly universal, fungal diseases can cause the loss of an entire crop, as with the potato in Ireland, and as with the monocultured crop of maize (corn) in the US in 1970, where over a billion dollars' worth of production was lost. Similarly, the 'Gros Michel' seedless banana crop was essentially completely destroyed worldwide in the 1950s by the wild fungus, Fusarium oxysporum. It was replaced by the Cavendish banana, which in turn was in 2015 facing total destruction by the same disease.

=== Diseases of humans and livestock ===
Pathogenic fungi cause a variety of diseases in humans and livestock. Aspergillosis, most commonly caused by Aspergillus fumigatus, kills some 600,000 people per year, mostly those with already weakened immune systems. Pneumocystis causes pneumonia, again mainly in people with weakened immune systems. Candida yeasts are the agents of Candidiasis, causing infections of the mouth, throat, and genital tract, and more seriously of the blood. Ringworm is a skin infection that infects some 20% of the human population; it is caused by some 40 different fungi.
