= Forbidden fruit =

Fruit in the Garden of Eden

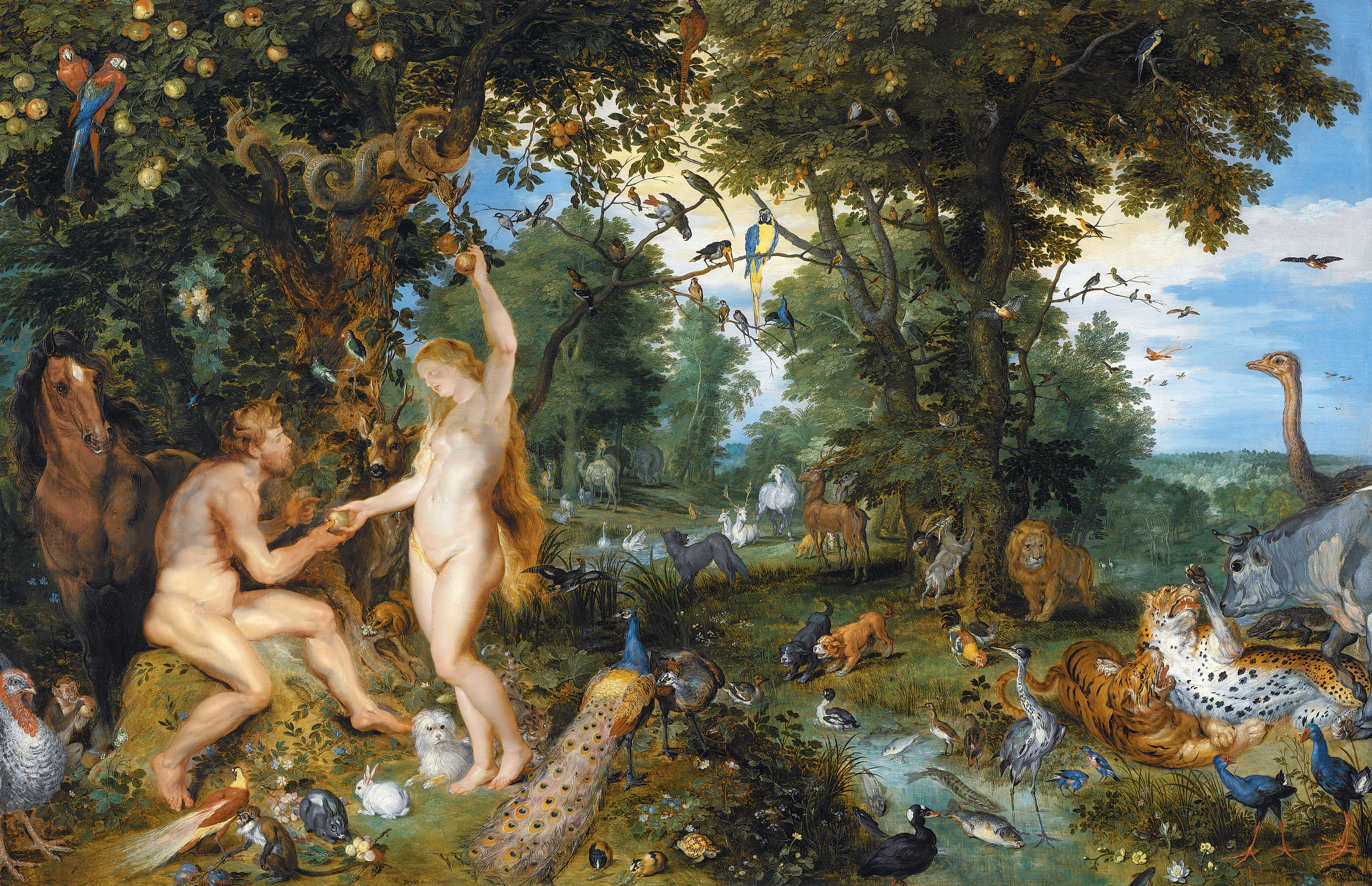
The Garden of Eden with the Fall of Man by Jan Brueghel de Oude and Peter Paul Rubens

In Abrahamic religions, forbidden fruit is a name given to the fruit growing in the Garden of Eden that God commands mankind not to eat. In the Biblical story of Genesis, Adam and Eve disobey God and commit the original sin, eating the forbidden fruit from the tree of the knowledge of good and evil, and are exiled from Eden:

And the Lord God commanded the man, saying, Of every tree of the garden thou mayest freely eat:

But of the tree of the knowledge of good and evil, thou shalt not eat of it: for in the day that thou eatest thereof thou shalt surely die.

— Genesis 2:16–17, King James Version

As a metaphor outside of the Abrahamic religions, the phrase typically refers to any indulgence or pleasure that is considered illegal or immoral.

== Biblical story ==
The story of the Book of Genesis places the first man and woman, Adam and Eve, in the Garden of Eden, where they may eat the fruit of many trees, but are forbidden by God to eat from the tree of knowledge of good and evil.

In Genesis 3, a serpent tempts the woman:

And the serpent said unto the woman, Ye shall not surely die:

For God doth know that in the day ye eat thereof, then your eyes shall be opened, and ye shall be as gods, knowing good and evil.

— Genesis 3:4–5, KJV

Desiring this knowledge, the woman eats the forbidden fruit and gives some to the man, who also eats it. They become aware of their nakedness and make fig-leaf clothes, and hide themselves when God approaches. When confronted, Adam tells God that Eve gave him the fruit to eat, and Eve tells God that the serpent deceived her into eating it. God then curses the serpent, the woman, and the man, and expels the man and woman from the Garden before they eat of the tree of eternal life.

== Quranic story ==
According to the Quran, Surah Al-A'raf 7:19 describes Adam and his wife in Paradise where they may eat what is provided, except for one Tree they must not eat from, lest they be considered Ẓālimūn (Arabic: ظالمون; 'wrongdoers').

Surah Al-A'raf 7:20–22 describes Shaitan (Arabic: شيطان; Satan), who whispers to Adam and his wife and deceives them. When they tasted of the tree, their nakedness was exposed to them, prompting them to cover themselves with leaves from Paradise.

Then their Lord called out to them, "Did I not forbid you from that tree and ˹did I not˺ tell you that Satan is your sworn enemy?"

— Surah Al-A'raf 7:22

== Gnostic story ==
A Gnostic interpretation of the story proposes that it was the archons who created Adam and attempted to prevent him from eating the forbidden fruit in order to keep him in a state of ignorance, after the spiritual form of Eve entered the Tree of the Knowledge of Good and Evil while leaving a physical version of herself with Adam once she awakened him. However, the forces of the heavenly realm (Pleroma) sent the serpent as a representative of the divine sphere to reveal to Adam and Eve the evil intentions of their creators. The serpent succeeded in convincing them to eat the fruit and become like gods, capable of distinguishing between good and evil.

== Identifications and depictions ==
The word fruit appears in Hebrew as פְּרִי, pərî. As to which fruit may have been the forbidden fruit of the Garden of Eden, possibilities include an apple, grapes, a pomegranate, a fig, carob, etrog or citron, pear, quince, wheat, banana, coco de mer, an olive, and mushrooms. The pseudepigraphic Book of Enoch describes the tree of knowledge: "It was like a species of the Tamarind tree, bearing fruit which resembled grapes extremely fine; and its fragrance extended to a considerable distance. I exclaimed, How beautiful is this tree, and how delightful is its appearance!" (1 Enoch 31:4).

In Islamic tradition, the fruit is commonly either identified with wheat or with grapevine.

=== Apple ===
In Western Europe, the fruit is often depicted as an apple. This is frequently explained as resulting from a misunderstanding of – or a pun on – two unrelated words mālum, a native Latin noun which means 'evil' (from the adjective malus), and mâlum, another Latin noun, borrowed from Greek μῆλον, which means 'apple'. In the Vulgate, Genesis 2:17 describes the tree as "de ligno autem scientiae boni et mali": "but of the tree [literally 'wood'] of knowledge of good and evil" (mali here is the genitive of malum). However, Yadin-Israel argues that Latin Christian writers from Late Antiquity and the Middle Ages rarely used mâlum to refer to the forbidden fruit.

Azzan Yadin-Israel argues that the identification of the forbidden fruit with an apple first appears in medieval French art of the 12th century. According to Yadin-Israel, Latin authors frequently referred to the forbidden fruit as pōmum, a Latin word meaning "fruit". From this term derived the Old French word pom (modern French pomme), which originally also meant "fruit", but in later times the word took on the narrower meaning of "apple". A similar shift occurred in English and German, with "appel" and apfel" (respectively) shifting from "fruit" generally to "apple" specifically, although a century or so later than French. This linguistic change shifted readings of earlier writings, retroactively evoking the image of an apple. This led medieval artists to increasingly use the apple from the 13th through 16th centuries, although the fig remained popular, especially in Italy. Then the 1550 edition of Martin Luther's Bible translation included a woodcut by Hans Brosamer that depicted an apple. The new publication technology allowed the apple imagery to spread rapidly across Europe.

An additional influence may have been the golden apple motif in Classical myth, such as the Apple of Discord, described in the Iliad.

Nothing in the Bible indicates that the forbidden fruit of the Tree of Knowledge was an apple.

The larynx, specifically the laryngeal prominence that joins the thyroid cartilage, in the human throat is noticeably more prominent in males and was consequently called an Adam's apple, from a notion that it was caused by the forbidden fruit getting stuck in Adam's throat as he swallowed it.

=== Grape ===
Rabbi Meir says that the fruit was a grape, made into wine. The Zohar explains similarly that Noah attempted (but failed) to rectify the sin of Adam by using grape wine for holy purposes. The midrash of Bereishit Rabah states that the fruit was grape, or squeezed grapes (perhaps alluding to wine). Chapter 4 of 3 Baruch, also known as the Greek Apocalypse of Baruch, designates the fruit as the grape. 3 Baruch is a first to third century text that is either Christian or Jewish with Christian interpolations.

=== Fig ===
The Bible states in the book of Genesis that Adam and Eve had made their own fig leaf clothing: "And the eyes of them both were opened, and they knew that they were naked; and they sewed fig-leaves together, and made themselves girdles". Rabbi Nehemiah Hayyun supports the idea that the fruit was a fig, as it was from fig leaves that Adam and Eve made garments for themselves after eating the fruit. "By that with which they were made low were they rectified." Since the fig is a long-standing symbol of female sexuality, it enjoyed a run as a favorite understudy to the apple as the forbidden fruit during the Italian Renaissance, Michelangelo Buonarroti depicting it as such in his fresco on the Sistine Chapel ceiling.

=== Pomegranate ===
Proponents of the theory that the Garden of Eden was located somewhere in what is now known as the Middle East suggest that the fruit was actually a pomegranate, as it is one of the earliest domesticated plants on the Eastern Mediterranean. The association of the pomegranate with knowledge of the underworld as provided in the Ancient Greek myth of Persephone may also have given rise to an association with knowledge of the otherworld, tying-in with knowledge that is forbidden to mortals. It is also believed Hades offered Persephone a pomegranate to force her to stay with him in the underworld. Hades is the Greek god of the underworld and the Bible states that whoever eats the forbidden fruit shall die.

=== Wheat ===
Rabbi Yehuda proposes that the fruit was wheat, because "a baby does not know to call its mother and father until it tastes the taste of grain."

In Hebrew, wheat is khitah, which has been considered to be a pun on khet, meaning "sin".

Although commonly confused with a seed, in the study of botany a wheat berry is technically a simple fruit known as a caryopsis, which has the same structure as an apple. Just as an apple is a fleshy fruit that contains seeds, a grain is a dry fruit that absorbs water and contains a seed. The confusion comes from the fact that the fruit of a grass happens to have a form similar to some seeds.

=== Mushroom ===
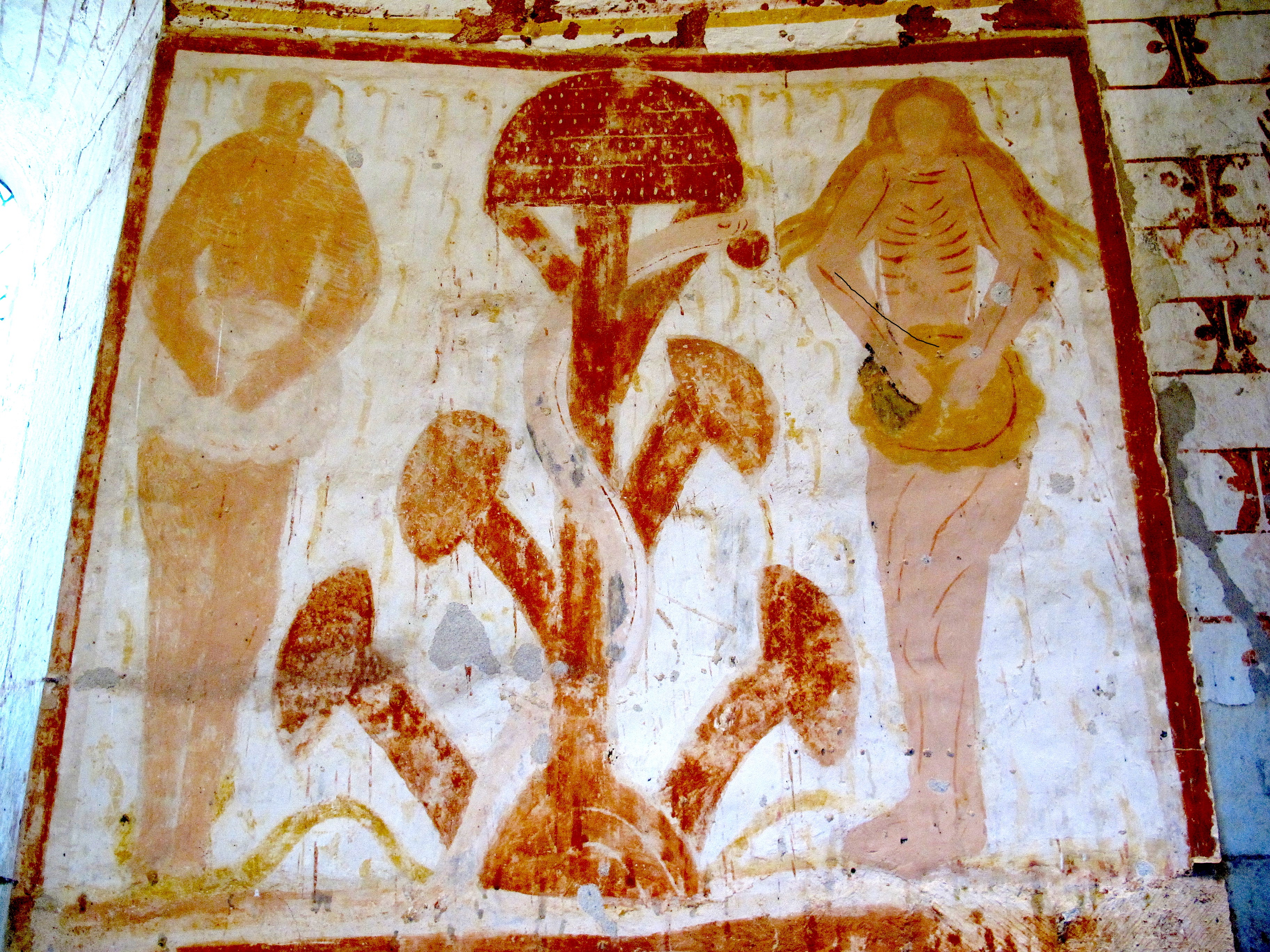

A fresco in the 13th-century Plaincourault Abbey in France depicts Adam and Eve in the Garden of Eden, flanking a Tree of Knowledge that has the appearance of a gigantic Amanita muscaria, a psychoactive mushroom.

Terence McKenna proposed that the forbidden fruit was a reference to psychotropic plants and fungi, specifically psilocybin mushrooms, which he theorized played a central role in the evolution of the human brain. Earlier, in a well-documented but heavily criticized study, John M. Allegro proposed the mushroom as the forbidden fruit.

=== Banana ===
Several proponents of the theory that the forbidden fruit was a banana exist dating from the 13th century.

In Nathan HaMe'ati's 13th-century translation of Maimonides's work The Medical Aphorisms of Moses, the banana is called the "apple of Eden". In the 16th century, Menahem Lonzano considered it common knowledge in Syria and Egypt that the banana was the apple of Eden.

=== Coco de mer ===
Charles George Gordon identified the forbidden fruit of the tree of knowledge with the coco de mer.

== Parallel concepts ==
Alcohol in the Bible explores the dual role of alcohol, highlighting its positive uses and warnings against excess. In biblical narratives, the fermentation of fruit into wine holds significance, with grapes and wine often linked to both celebration and cautionary tales of sin and temptation, reminiscent of the concept of the forbidden fruit.

=== Greek mythology ===
The similarities of the story to the story of Pandora's box were identified by early Christians such as Tertullian, Origen, and Gregory of Nazianzus.

== See also ==
- Grapefruit, originally named the "forbidden fruit" of Barbados.
- Medieval popular Bible
- Ningishzida
- Pomme d'Adammo
- Serpent seed
