= Cash crop =

Agricultural crop grown to sell for profit

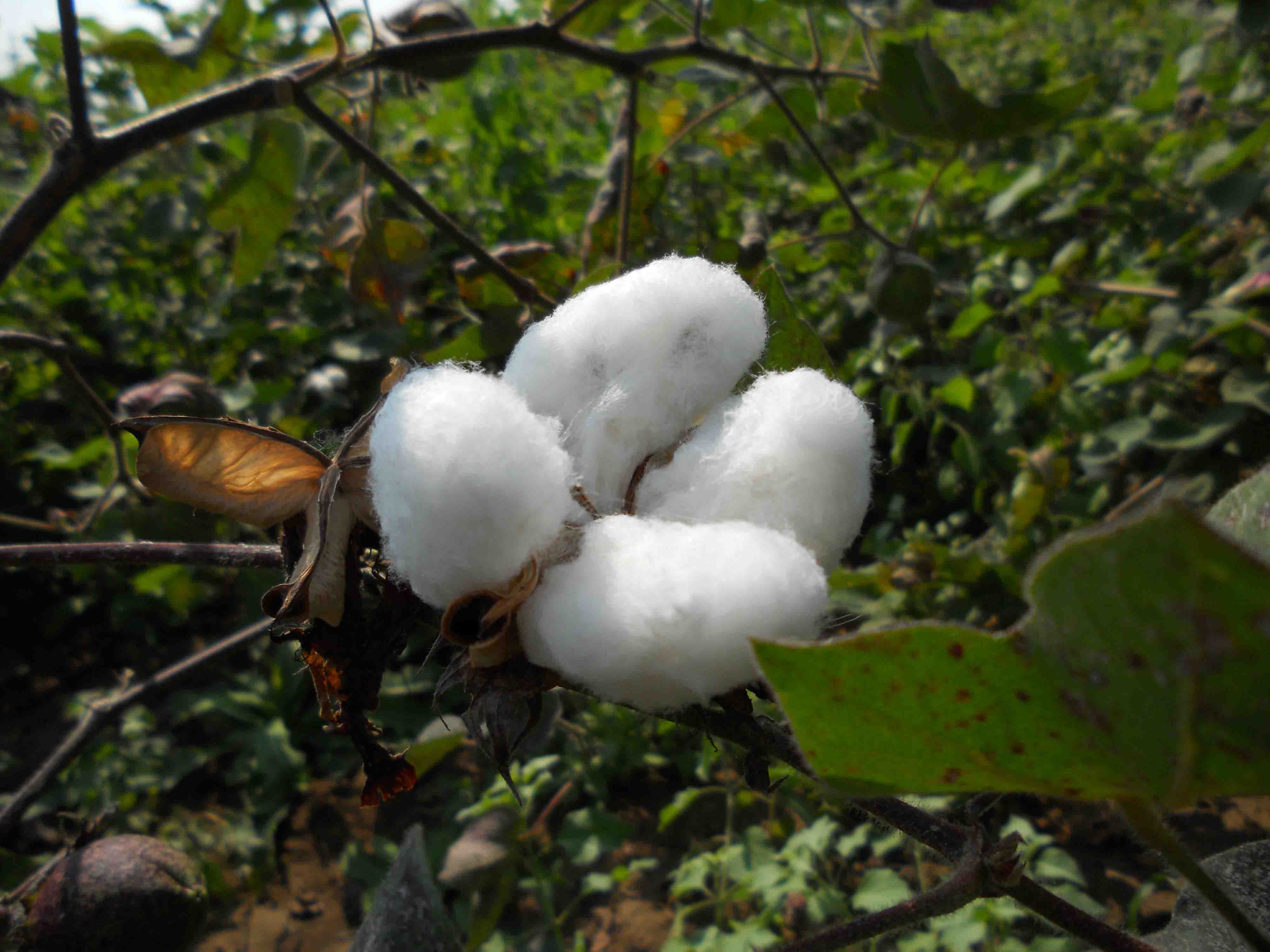
A cotton boll. Cotton is a significant cash crop. According to the National Cotton Council of America, in 2014, China was the world's largest cotton-producing country with an estimated output of about one hundred million 480-pound bales (22 billion tonnes).

A cash crop, also called profit crop, is an agricultural crop which is grown to sell for profit. It is typically purchased by parties separate from a farm. The term is used to differentiate a marketed crop from a staple crop ("subsistence crop") in subsistence agriculture, which is one fed to the producer's own livestock or grown as food for the producer's family.

In earlier times, cash crops were usually only a small (but vital) part of a farm's total yield, while today, especially in developed countries and among smallholders almost all crops are mainly grown for revenue. In the least developed countries, cash crops are usually crops which attract demand in more developed nation, and hence have some export value.

Prices for major cash crops are set in international trade markets with global scope, with some local variation (termed as "basis") based on freight costs and local supply and demand balance. A consequence of this is that a nation, region, or individual producer relying on such a crop may suffer low prices should a bumper crop elsewhere lead to excess supply on the global markets. This system has been criticized by traditional farmers. Coffee is an example of a product that has been susceptible to significant commodity futures price variations.

== Globalization ==
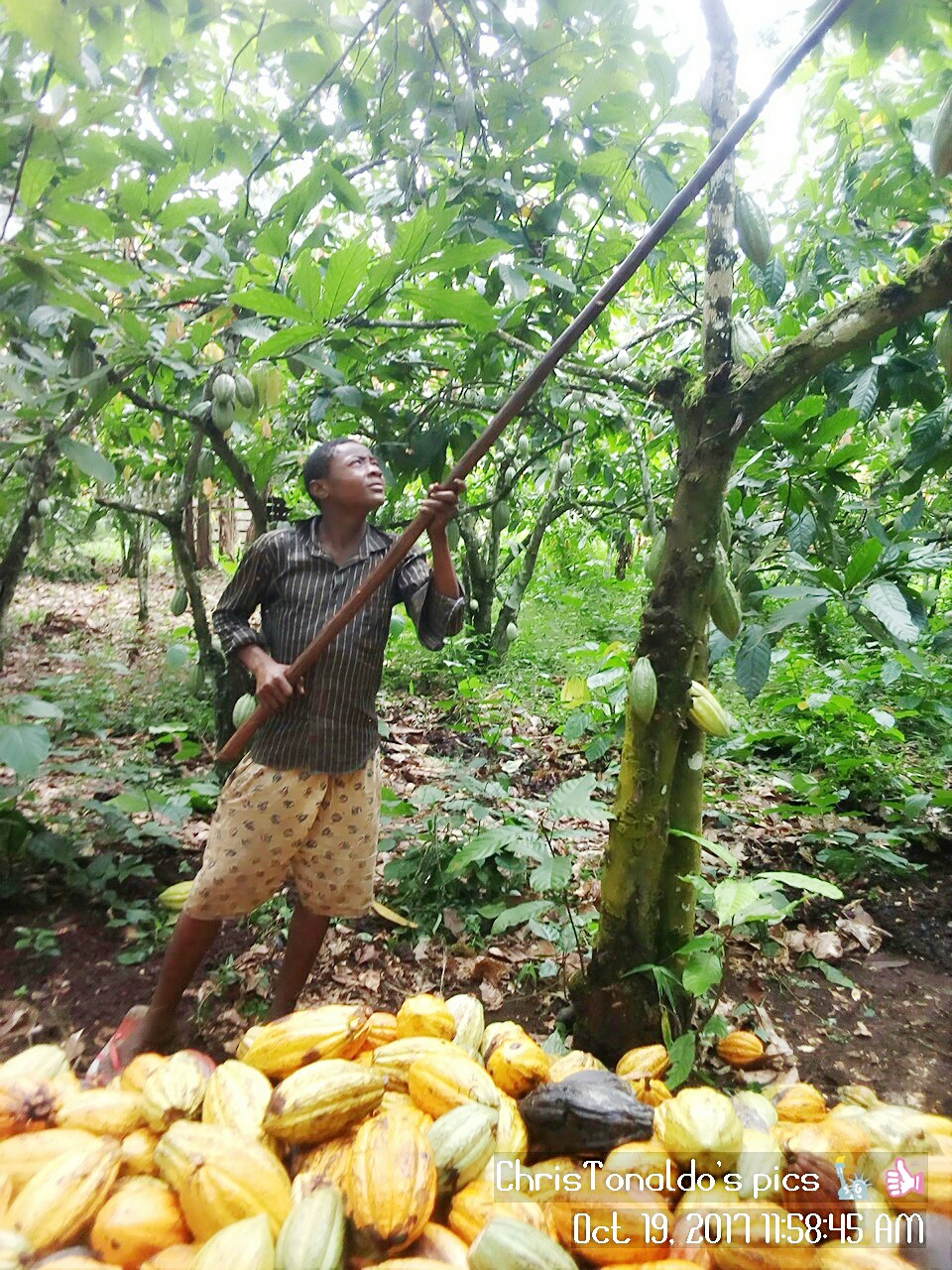
A farmer harvesting pods from a cacao tree (Theobroma cacao) in Cameroon. Originally native to South America, cacao has become an important cash crop in West Africa, which grows around 70% of the world's supply of cocoa beans.

Issues involving subsidies and trade barriers on such crops have become controversial in discussions of globalization. Many developing countries take the position that the current international trade system is unfair because it has caused tariffs to be lowered in industrial goods while allowing for low tariffs and agricultural subsidies for agricultural goods. This makes it difficult for a developing nation to export its goods overseas, and forces developing nations to compete with imported goods which are exported from developed nations at artificially low prices. The practice of exporting at artificially low prices is known as dumping, and is illegal in most nations. Controversy over this issue led to the collapse of the Cancún trade talks in 2003, when the Group of 22 refused to consider agenda items proposed by the European Union unless the issue of agricultural subsidies was addressed.

== Per climate zones ==
=== Arctic ===
The Arctic climate is generally not conducive for the cultivation of cash crops. However, one potential cash crop for the Arctic is Rhodiola rosea, a hardy plant used as a medicinal herb that grows in the Arctic. There is currently consumer demand for the plant, but the available supply is less than the demand (as of 2011).

=== Temperate ===
Cash crops grown in regions with a temperate climate include many cereals (wheat, rye, corn, barley, oats), oil-yielding crops (e.g. grapeseed, mustard seeds), vegetables (e.g. potatoes), lumber yielding trees (e.g. Spruce, Pines, Firs), tree fruit or top fruit (e.g. apples, cherries) and soft fruit (e.g. strawberries, raspberries).

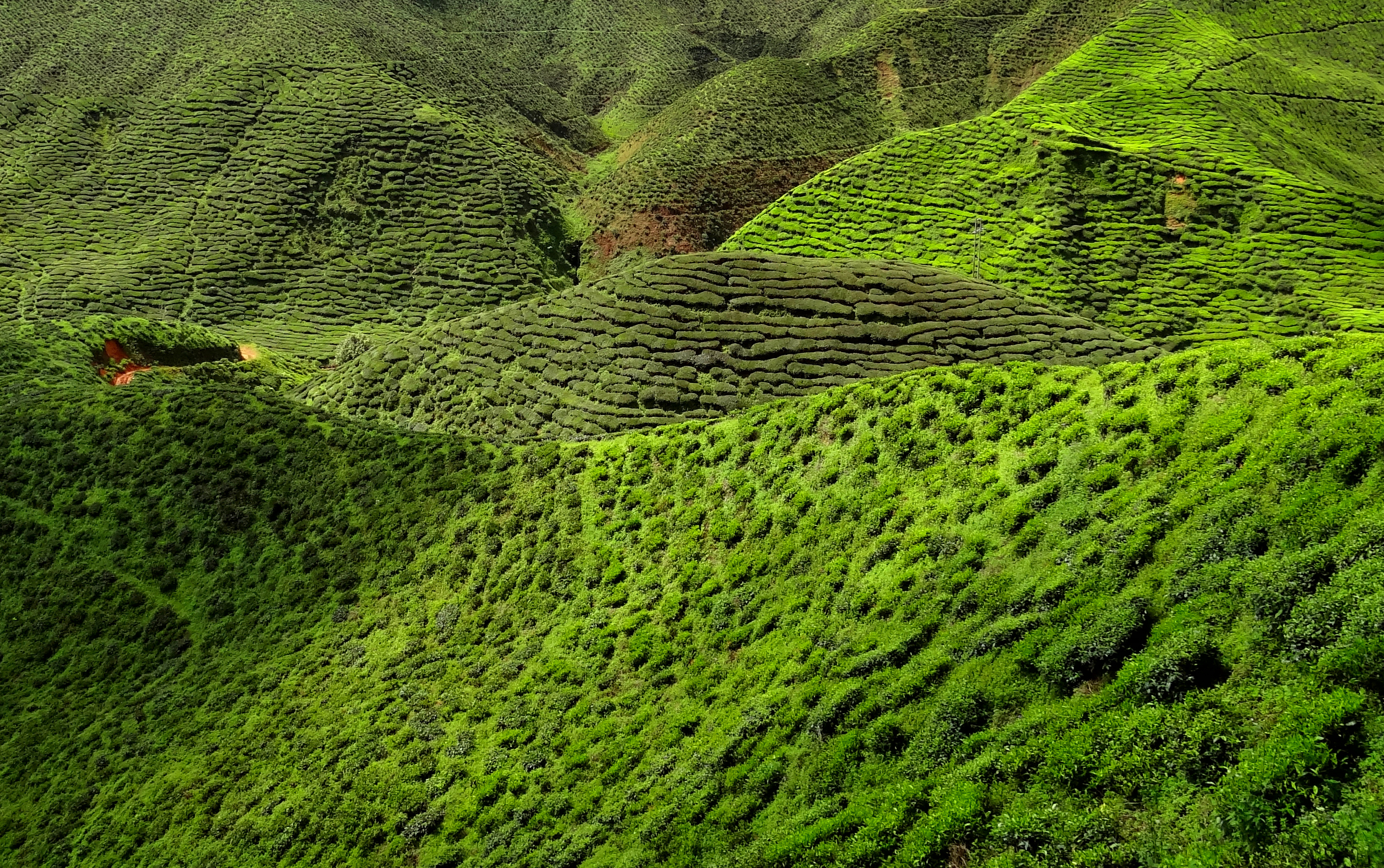
A tea (Camelia sinensis) plantation in the Cameron Highlands in Malaysia

=== Subtropical ===
In regions with a subtropical climate, oil-yielding crops (e.g. soybeans), cotton, rice, tobacco, indigo, citrus, pomegranates, and some vegetables and herbs are the predominant cash crops.

=== Tropical ===
In regions with a tropical climate, coffee, cocoa, sugar cane, bananas, oranges, cotton and jute are common cash crops. The oil palm is a tropical palm tree, and the fruit from it is used to make palm oil.

== By continent and country ==
=== Africa ===
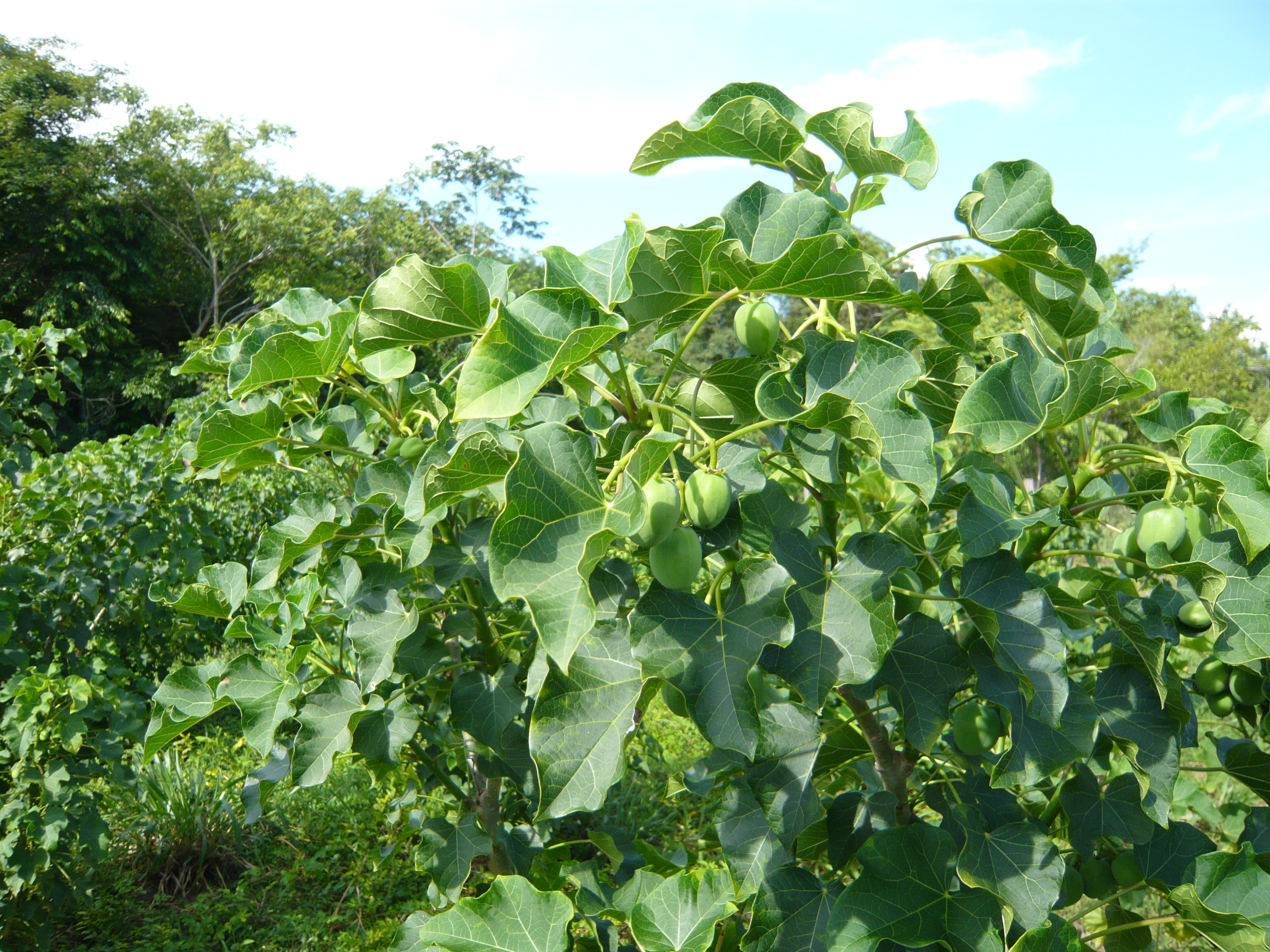
Jatropha curcas is a cash crop used to produce biofuel.

Around 60 percent of African workers are employed in the agricultural sector, with about three-fifths of African farmers being subsistence farmers. For example, in Burkina Faso 85% of its residents (over two million people) are reliant upon cotton production for income, and over half of the country's population lives in poverty. Larger farms tend to grow cash crops such as coffee, tea, cotton, cocoa, fruit and rubber. These farms, typically operated by large corporations, cover dozens of square kilometres and employ large numbers of laborers. Subsistence farms provide a source of food and a relatively small income for families, but generally fail to produce enough to make re-investment possible.

The situation in which African nations export crops while a significant number of people on the continent struggle with hunger has been blamed on developed countries, including the United States, Japan and the European Union. These countries protect their own agricultural sectors, through high import tariffs and offer subsidies to their farmers, which some have contended is leading to the overproduction of commodities such as cotton, grain and milk. The result of this is that the global price of such products is continually reduced until Africans are unable to compete in world markets, except in cash crops that do not grow easily in temperate climates.

Africa has realized significant growth in biofuel plantations, many of which are on lands which were purchased by British companies. Jatropha curcas is a cash crop grown for biofuel production in Africa. Some have criticized the practice of raising non-food plants for export while Africa has problems with hunger and food shortages, and some studies have correlated the proliferation of land acquisitions, often for use to grow non-food cash crops with increasing hunger rates in Africa.

=== Australia ===
Australia produces significant amounts of lentils. It was estimated in 2010 that Australia would produce approximately 143,000 tons of lentils. Most of Australia's lentil harvest is exported to the Indian subcontinent and the Middle East.

=== Italy ===
Italy's Cassa per il Mezzogiorno in 1950 led to the government implementing incentives to grow cash crops such as tomatoes, tobacco and citrus fruits. As a result, they created an over abundance of these crops causing an over saturation of these crops on the global market. This caused these crops to depreciate.

=== United States ===
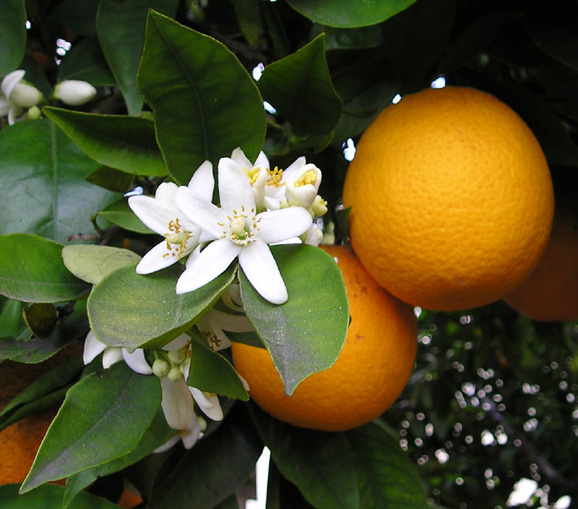
Oranges are a significant U.S. cash crop.

Cash cropping in the United States dates back to the colonial period with crops like tobacco, indigo, cotton and others farmed on massive scales on southern plantations primarily fueled by black slave labor, even after the end of slavery this system continued in some form with the share cropping system where farmers would live and work on large plantations for a share of the crop to sell themselves. Cash cropping of fruits rose to prominence after the baby boomer generation and the end of World War II. It was seen as a way to feed the large population boom and continues to be the main factor in having an affordable food supply in the United States. According to the 1997 U.S. Census of Agriculture, 90% of the farms in the United States are still owned by families, with an additional 6% owned by a partnership. Cash crop farmers have utilized precision agricultural technologies combined with time-tested practices to produce affordable food. Based upon United States Department of Agriculture (USDA) statistics for 2010, states with the highest fruit production quantities are California, Florida and Washington.

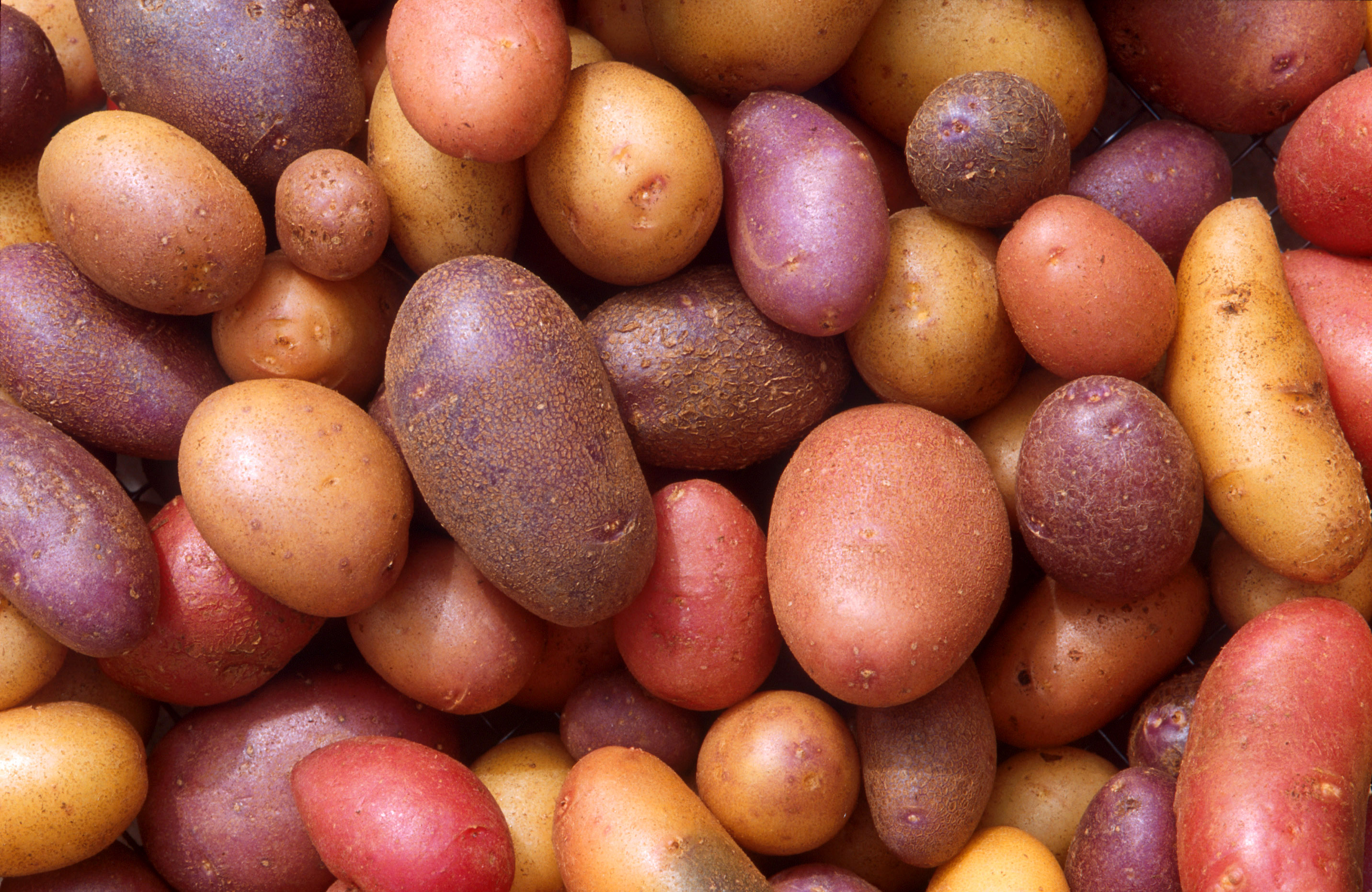
Various potato cultivars

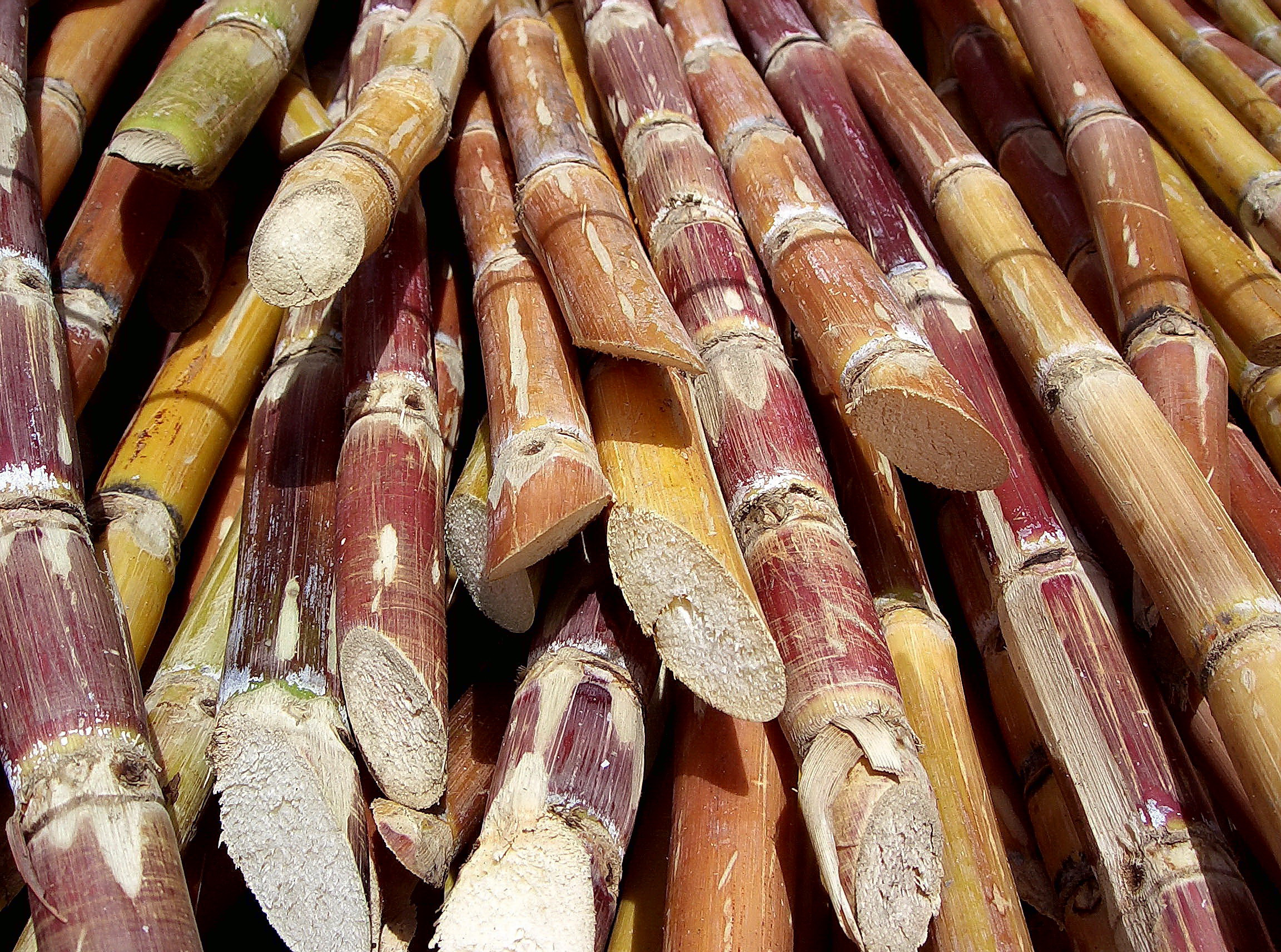
Sliced sugarcane, a significant cash crop in Hawaii

=== Vietnam ===
Coconut is a cash crop of Vietnam.

== Global cash crops ==
Coconut palms are cultivated in more than 80 countries of the world, with a total production of 61 million tonnes per year. The oil and milk derived from it are commonly used in cooking and frying; coconut oil is also widely used in soaps and cosmetics.

== Sustainability of cash crops ==
Approximately 70% of the world's food is produced by 500 million smallholder farmers. For their livelihood they depend on the production of cash crops, basic commodities that are hard to differentiate in the market. The great majority (80%) of the world's farms measure 2 hectares or less. These smallholder farmers are mainly found in developing countries and are often unorganized, illiterate or have only basic education. Smallholder farmers have little bargaining power and incomes are low, leading to a situation in which they cannot invest much in upscaling their businesses. In general, farmers lack access to agricultural inputs and finance, and do not have enough knowledge on good agricultural and business practices. These high level problems are in many cases threatening the future of agricultural sectors and theories start evolving on how to secure a sustainable future for agriculture. Sustainable market transformations are initiated in which industry leaders work together in a pre-competitive environment to change market conditions. Sustainable intensification focuses on facilitating entrepreneurial farmers. To stimulate farm investment, projects on access to finance for agriculture are also popping up. One example is the SCOPE methodology, an assessment tool that measures the management maturity and professionalism of producer organizations as to give financing organizations better insights in the risks involved in financing. Currently, agricultural finance is always considered risky and avoided by financial institutions.

== Black market cash crops ==
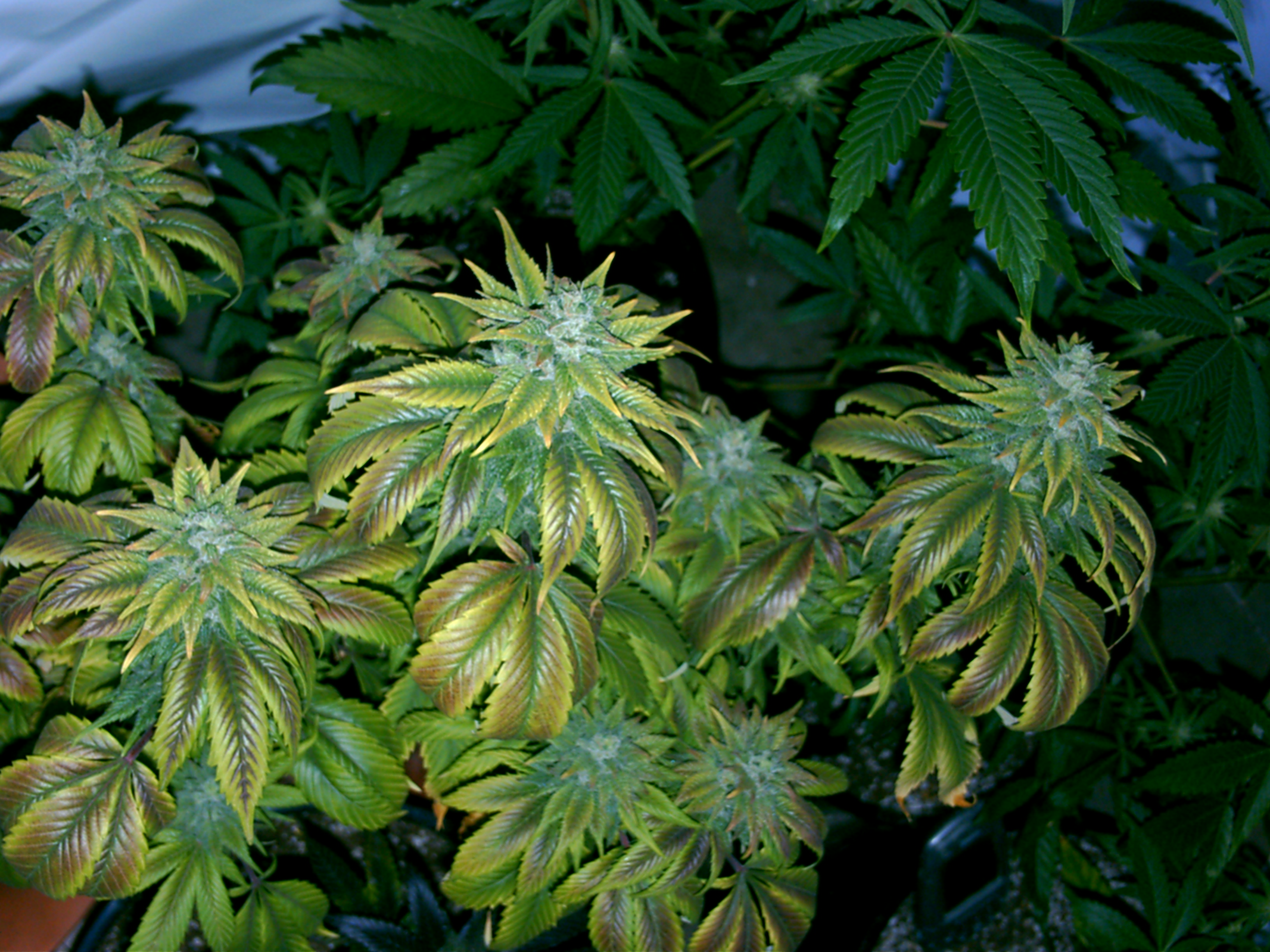
In the U.S., cannabis has been termed as a cash crop.

Coca, opium poppies and cannabis are significant black market cash crops, the prevalence of which varies. In the United States, cannabis is considered by some to be the most valuable cash crop. In 2006, it was reported in a study by Jon Gettman, a marijuana policy researcher, that in contrast to government figures for legal crops such as corn and wheat and using the study's projections for U.S. cannabis production at that time, cannabis was cited as "the top cash crop in 12 states and among the top three cash crops in 30". The study also estimated cannabis production at the time (in 2006) to be valued at US$35.8 billion, which exceeded the combined value of corn at $23.3 billion and wheat at $7.5 billion.

== See also ==
- Agricultural value chain
- Energy crop
- Fiber crop
- Food vs. fuel
- Fodder
- Human uses of fungi
- List of psychoactive plants, fungi, and animals
- Medicinal plant
- Mixed farming
- Monoculture
- Monocropping
- Polyculture
- Seaweed farming
- Staple food
