= Legends of the coco de mer =

Species of palm tree native to Africa

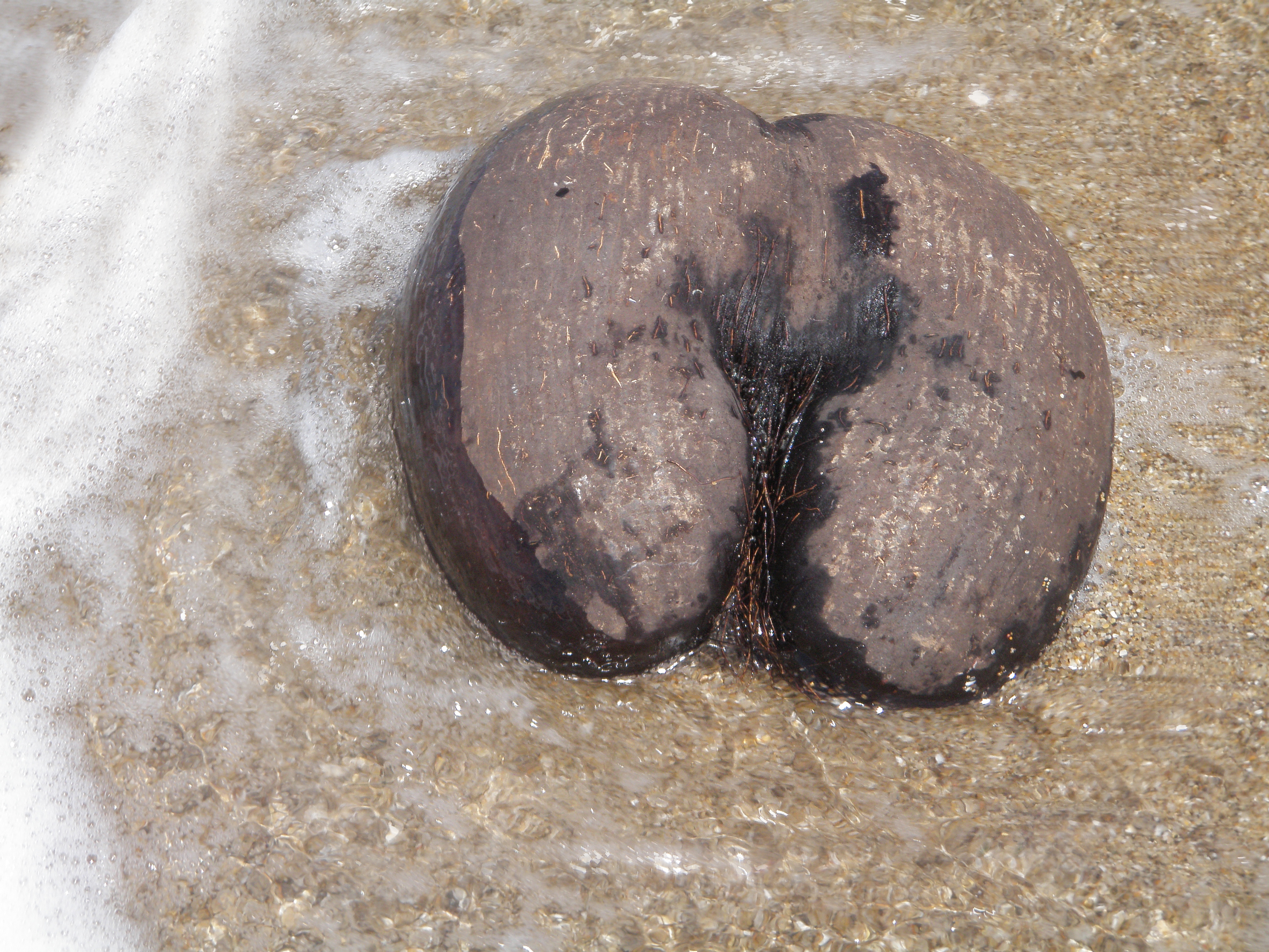
The mature coco de mer nut without its husk sometimes washes up onto beaches

The nut and tree of the coco de mer is a rare species of palm tree native to Africa, in the Seychelles archipelago in the Indian Ocean. It is the subject of various legends and lore. Coco de mer is endemic to the Seychelles islands of Praslin and Curieuse. Before the Seychelles were discovered and settled, nuts of this species were sometimes carried by the ocean currents to distant shores, such as those of the Maldives, where the tree was unknown. These floating nuts did not germinate. The exceptional size and suggestive form of the nut, the circumstances of its discovery, and some unusual qualities of the trees have given rise to several legends.

== Context ==
The nut of the coco de mer is very large (the largest seed in the plant kingdom) and is oddly shaped, being the shape and size of a woman's disembodied buttocks on one side, and a woman's belly and thighs on the other side. Not surprisingly, this nut was viewed by people in other parts of the world as a rare and fascinating object with mythological and even magical properties. The nature and origin of this extraordinary nut was mysterious, and the propagation of the tree was not understood. A number of legends arose both about the nuts, and about the trees that produce them.

The coco de mer palm has separate male and female trees, unlike the coconut palm. And, unlike the fruit of the coconut tree, the coco de mer fruit is not adapted to disperse naturally by floating on the ocean water. When a coco de mer fruit falls into the sea, it cannot float because of its high density; instead it sinks to the bottom. However, after the fruit has been on the sea bed for a considerable period of time, the husk drops off, the internal parts of the nut decay, and the gases that form inside the nut cause the bare nut to rise up to the surface. At that time the nut can float, but is no longer fertile, thus when the ocean currents cause the nut to wash up on a distant beach, for example in the Maldives, a tree cannot, and does not, grow from the nut.

The name coco de mer is French, and means "coconut of the sea".

== Legends predating the discovery of the Seychelles ==
Malay seamen had seen coco de mer nuts "falling upwards" from the sea bed, and so they had reasoned that these nuts must grow on underwater trees, in a forest at the bottom of the Indian Ocean. According to Antonio Pigafetta and Georg Eberhard Rumphius, Malay people believed that the tree was also the home of the huge bird or bird-like creature Garuda (or Rukh of the Arabs). African priests believed that the Garuda was capable of hunting elephants and tigers. The African priests also believe that sometimes the coco de mer trees rose up above the ocean surface, and when this happened, the waves that the trees created did not allow any ship nearby to sail away and the helpless sailors were eaten by the Garuda.

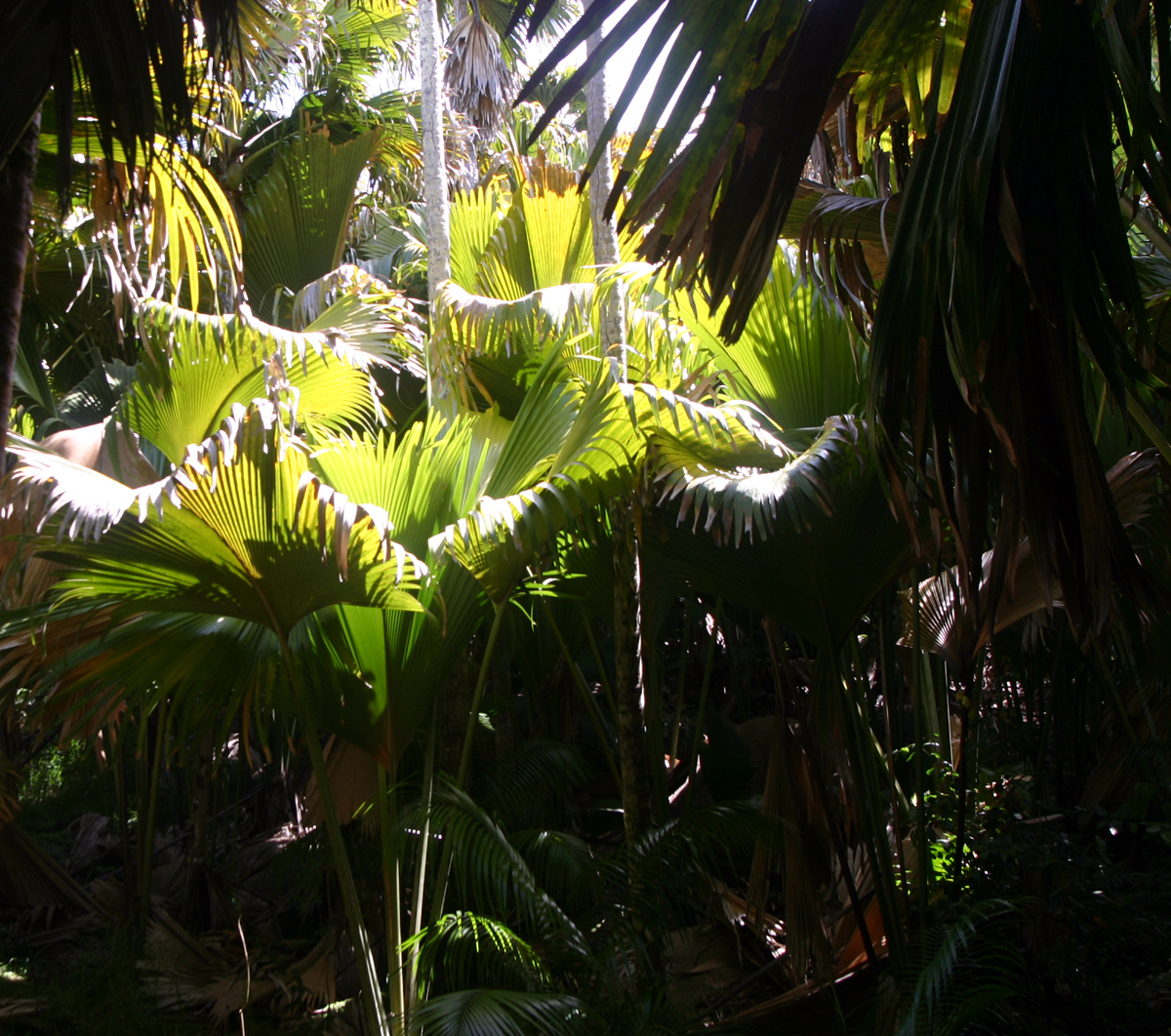
Coco de Mar trees at the Vallée de Mai Nature Reserve

The nuts that were found in the ocean and on the beaches no longer had a husk, and resembled the dismembered lower part of a woman's body, including the buttocks. This association is reflected in one of the plant's archaic botanical names, Lodoicea callipyge Comm. ex J. St.-Hil., in which callipyge is from the Greek words meaning "beautiful rump". Historically these floating "beautiful rumps" were collected and sold for a fortune in Arabia and in Europe.

In the Maldives, any coco de mer nuts that were found in the ocean or on the beaches were supposed to be given to the king, and keeping a nut for yourself or selling it could have resulted in the death penalty. However, Rudolf II, Holy Roman Emperor was able to purchase one of these nuts for 4,000 gold florins. The Dutch Admiral Wolfert Hermanssen also received a nut as a gift for his services, from the Sultan of Bantam in 1602, for fighting the Portuguese and protecting the capital of Bantam. However, the nut that the admiral was given was missing the top part; apparently the Sultan had ordered the top of the nut to be cut off, in order not to upset the noble admiral's modesty. João de Barros believed that coco de mer possessed amazing healing powers, superior even to those of "the precious stone Bezoar". In one of his books, Dr. Berthold Carl Seemann mentioned that many believed the nuts to be an antidote to all poisons. The nuts were praised not only by scientists and botanists, but also by poets. Luís de Camões wrote:

O'er lone Maldivia's islets grows the plant,
beneath profoundest seas, of sov'reign might,
whose pome of ev'ry Theriack is confest,
by cunning leech of antidotes the best

In 1769, Jean Duchemin sailed to Praslin, the second largest island in the Seychelles, on the ship L’Heureuse Marie. He loaded up with a cargo of these unusual nuts, which he later sold in Indian markets. After his trip, coco de mer nuts never again held the same extraordinary value.

== Legends after the discovery of the Seychelles ==
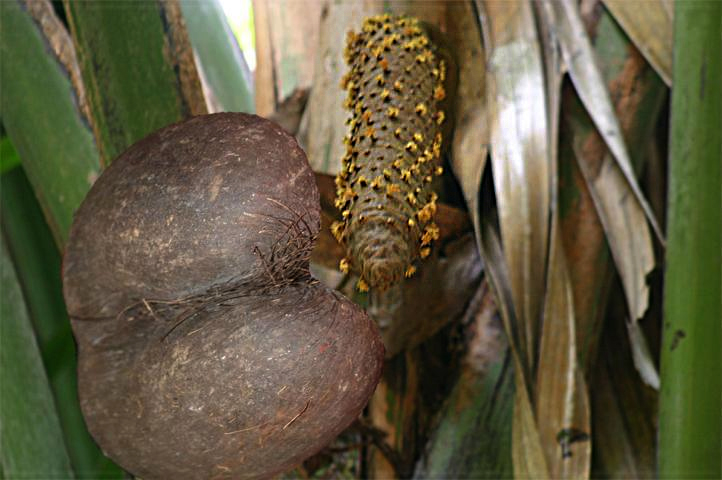
Photo collage showing the female coco de mer fruit with no husk as well as the male coco de mer catkin

New legends about the coco de mer came into existence after 1743, when the real coco de mer trees were discovered. Fruits of coco de mer are developed only on female trees. Male trees have long phallic-looking catkins. Because of these unusual, erotic shapes, some people believed that the trees made passionate love on stormy nights. According to the legend, male trees uproot themselves, and approach female trees. Apparently the love-making trees are rather shy, and the legend has it that whoever sees the trees mating will die or go blind. The fact that even now the pollination of the coco de mer is not fully understood is one of the factors behind the legend.

In the Victorian era, General Charles George Gordon, who visited the Seychelles in 1881, believed that the Vallée de Mai on the island of Praslin was the original Garden of Eden as described in the Bible, and that the coco de mer was the forbidden fruit of the tree of the knowledge of good and evil. General Gordon wrote:

externally the coco-de-mer represents the belly and thighs, the true seat of carnal desires

It occurred to at least some of Gordon's readers that if coco de mer was really the forbidden fruit, Eve would have had a very hard time handing this gigantic fruit (which weighs 15–30 kg) to Adam.
