= The Garden of Eden with the Fall of Man =

1615 painting by Peter Paul Rubens and Jan Brueghel the Elder

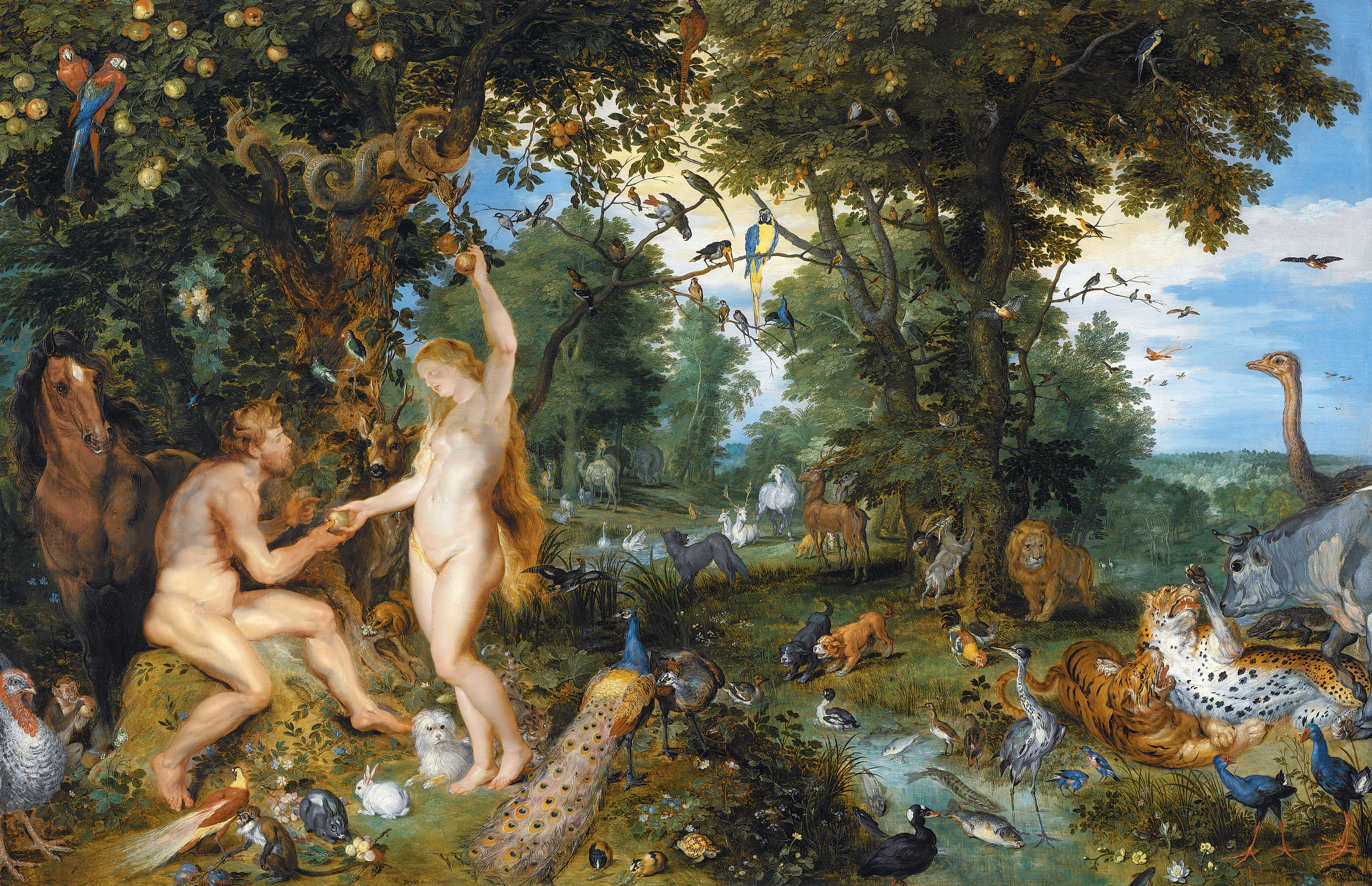
- Artists: Peter Paul Rubens, Jan Brueghel the Elder
- Year: c. 1615
- Medium: Oil on panel
- Dimensions: 74.3 cm × 114.7 cm (29.3 in × 45.2 in)
- Location: Mauritshuis, The Hague

The Garden of Eden with the Fall of Man or The Earthly Paradise with the Fall of Adam and Eve (c. 1615) is a painting by Peter Paul Rubens (figures) and Jan Brueghel the Elder (flora and fauna). It is housed in the Mauritshuis art museum in The Hague, Netherlands. The painting depicts the moment just before the consumption of forbidden fruit and the fall of man.

Adam and Eve are depicted beneath the tree of the knowledge of good and evil, where various fruits grow. On the opposite side the tree of life is depicted, also laden with fruits.

The scene is a reference to Genesis 2:8–14 and hosts a variety of animals, presumably 100, from diverse ecosystems. There is a capuchin monkey from South America, near the bottom left, who bites into an apple to symbolize the sin about to be committed by Adam and Eve. Since Adam has yet to commit the original sin, these creatures all live in harmony – a cow peacefully watches while two large cats play. Birds of Paradise are also painted with a scientific accuracy. Up until the time of this painting, these birds were believed to lack feet, and in this painting, they are depicted clearly. This was a modernistic move on Bruegel's behalf.

The monkey next to Adam is the hotspur who cannot resist temptation, while the choleric cat near Eve's heels represents cruel cunning. In Christian symbolism, several grapes in the foliage behind Adam and Eve represent Christ's death on the cross, as wine represents his blood. A plethora of exotic birds such as peacocks and macaws spectate Adam's detrimental demise.

== Artists ==
Several attempts were made at this painting to showcase the best work of each artist. Rubens started the painting, sketching Adam and Eve in thin paint, followed by the tree and serpent. The details were then meticulously painted by Brueghel. The pair were known not only as collaborators, but also as the best of friends, so much so that Rubens was godfather to Brueghel's children. The two artists were leading painters in the first three decades of the 17th century. Rubens was known for his depiction of supple human bodies, while Bruegel was known for his animals, flora, and fauna. This painting serves as a primary example of the nickname "Velvet Brueghel" given to Jan Brueghel the Elder for his delicate brushwork.

== Provenance ==
From 1766, the painting was in the collection of Pieter de la Court van der Voort of Leiden. Then it was in the possession of William V, Prince of Orange and in 1816 it was placed in the collection of the Royal Picture Gallery Mauritshuis in The Hague.
