= Paolo Antonio Barbieri =

Italian Baroque painter (1603–1649)

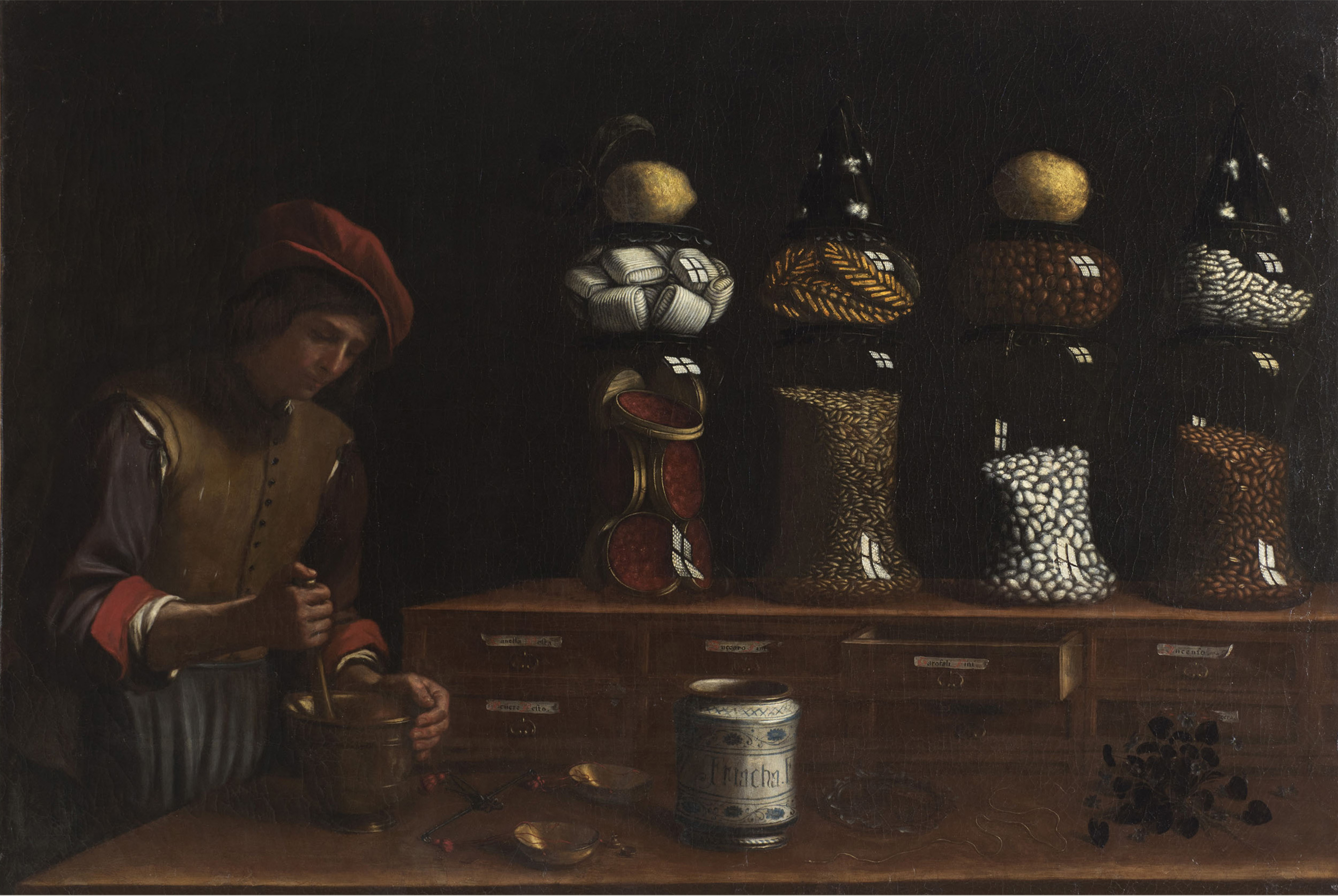
The Spice Shop, 1637

Paolo Antonio Barbieri (1603–1649) was a Bolognese painter of the Italian Baroque. He was the brother of Giovanni Francesco Barbieri, usually known as Il Guercino. He was born at Cento, a village near Bologna. The subjects of his pictures are flowers, fruit, and game, but he particularly excelled in painting fish, which he represented with astonishing fidelity.

== Biography ==
Paolo was born in Cento, near Bologna, in 1603.

He devoted himself to painting under the guidance of his brother, who sometimes added figures to his paintings, such as the figure of the fisherman in a still life of fish, or that of the gardener in a fruit composition. From the school of Guercino, he learnt to use chiaroscuro and the vivacity of color, but – following a natural inclination – he dedicated himself to the "minor" genre of naturalistic painting, portraying landscapes, objects of common life, animals, flowers, fruit and still lifes, with a marked taste of composition and color. The delicate trait and the striking vividness of his paintings brought him considerable fame.

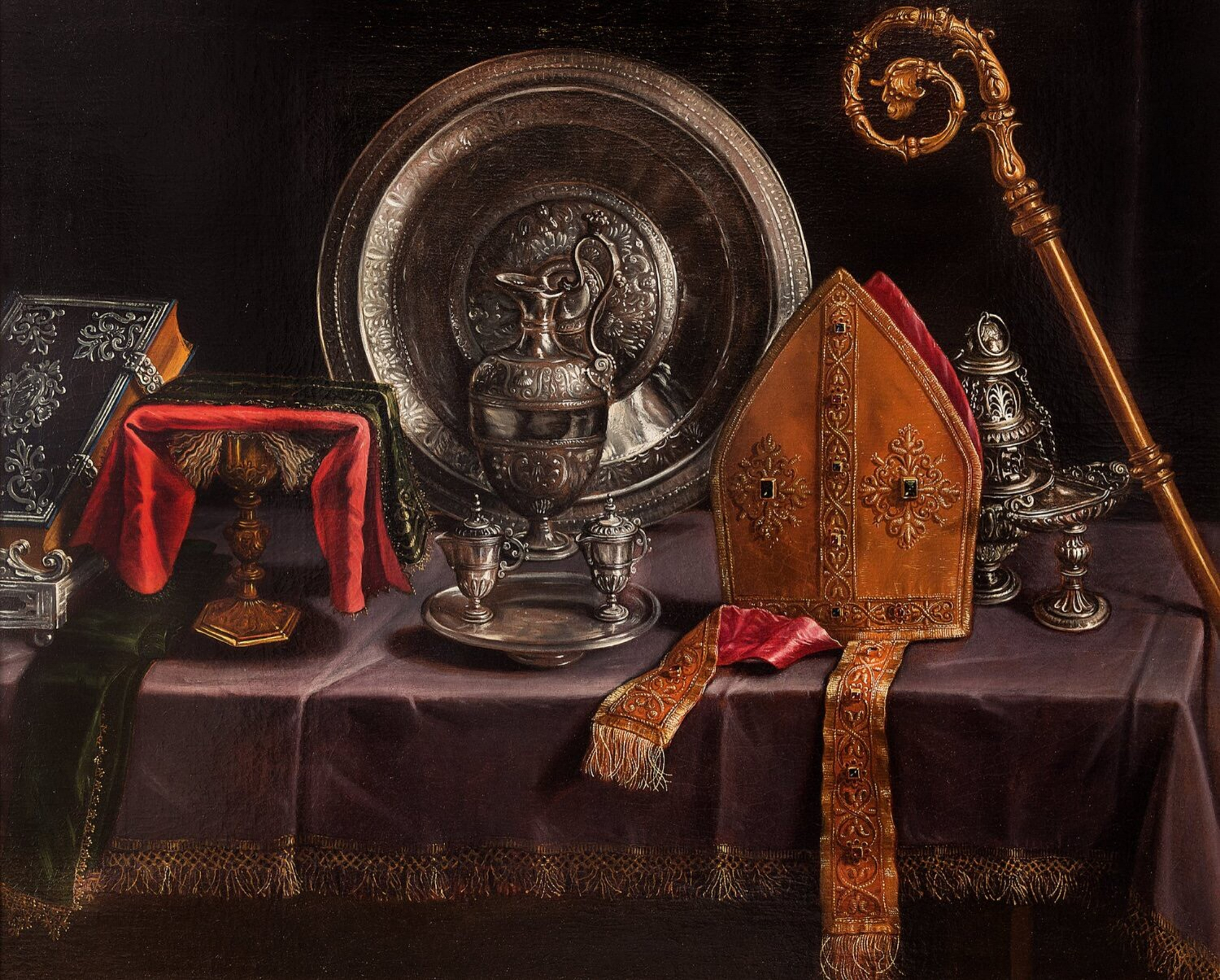
Still life with silverware and bishop's vestments

In 1649, Paolo died prematurely in Bologna. His brother Guercino mourned his premature death. According to his diary, more than forty works belonged to him: some in the Galleria Costabili in Ferrara (two paintings of hunting with live and dead animals, and three of fruit and game), others in Cento (Tiazzi house, Municipal Art Gallery), in Modena (Galleria Campori and Galleria Coccapani), in Bologna (Pinacoteca, Gualandi collection) and in Rome (a painting in the Galleria Corsini).

== Bibliography ==
- Bryan, Michael (1886). Robert Edmund Graves (ed.). Dictionary of Painters and Engravers, Biographical and Critical. Vol. I: A-K. London: George Bell and Sons. p. 81.
- Ruggeri, Ugo (2003). Barbieri, Paolo Antonio. Oxford Art Online (Grove Art). doi:10.1093/gao/9781884446054.article.T006271. (subscription required)
