= Cyclosporins =

The cyclosporins are a group of macrolides isolated from fungi and used as immunosuppressant drugs, for example after transplant surgery. They are nonribosomal peptide synthesized by cyclosporin synthetase.

- Cyclosporin A (ciclosporin)
- Cyclosporin B
- Cyclosporin C
- Cyclosporin D
- Cyclosporin E
- Cyclosporin F
- Cyclosporin G
