= Plaincourault Chapel =

Chapel located in Indre, France

Coordinates: 46°36′46.8″N 0°57′01.7″E

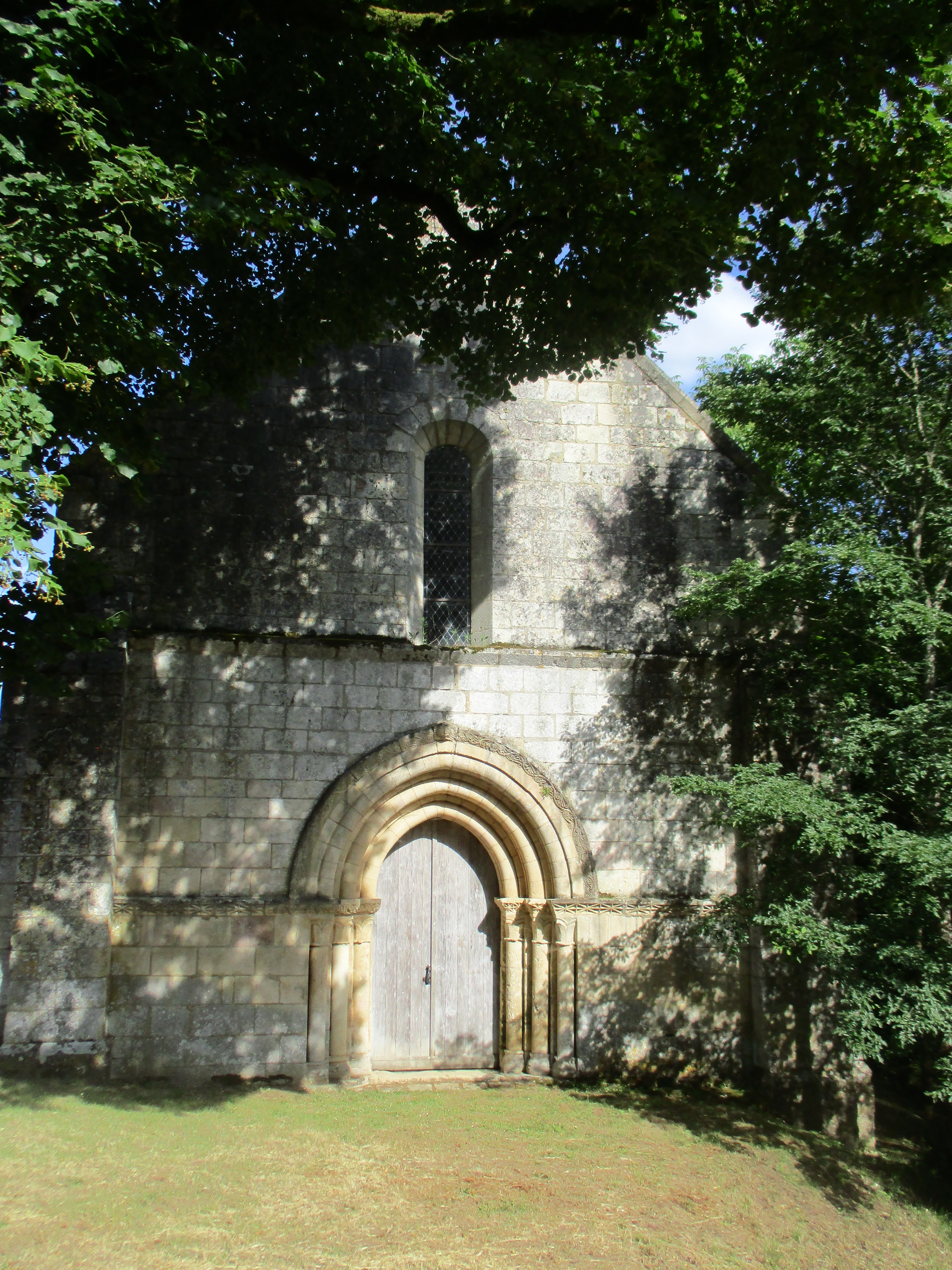
Facade of the Romanesque chapel of Plaincourault, facing west.

Plaincourault Chapel is a 12th-century chapel of the Knights Hospitaller in Mérigny, Indre, France. The structure, which is located next to the Château de Plaincourault, suffered extensive damage during the French Revolution and was abandoned in 1793. It was declared a historical monument in 1944, but was not restored until the Parc naturel régional de la Brenne took ownership of the property in 1994. The chapel is famous for its unusual Romanesque art, particularly its Christian frescoes. As part of the Château de Plaincourault complex, it is designated by the French Ministry of Culture as a monument historique.

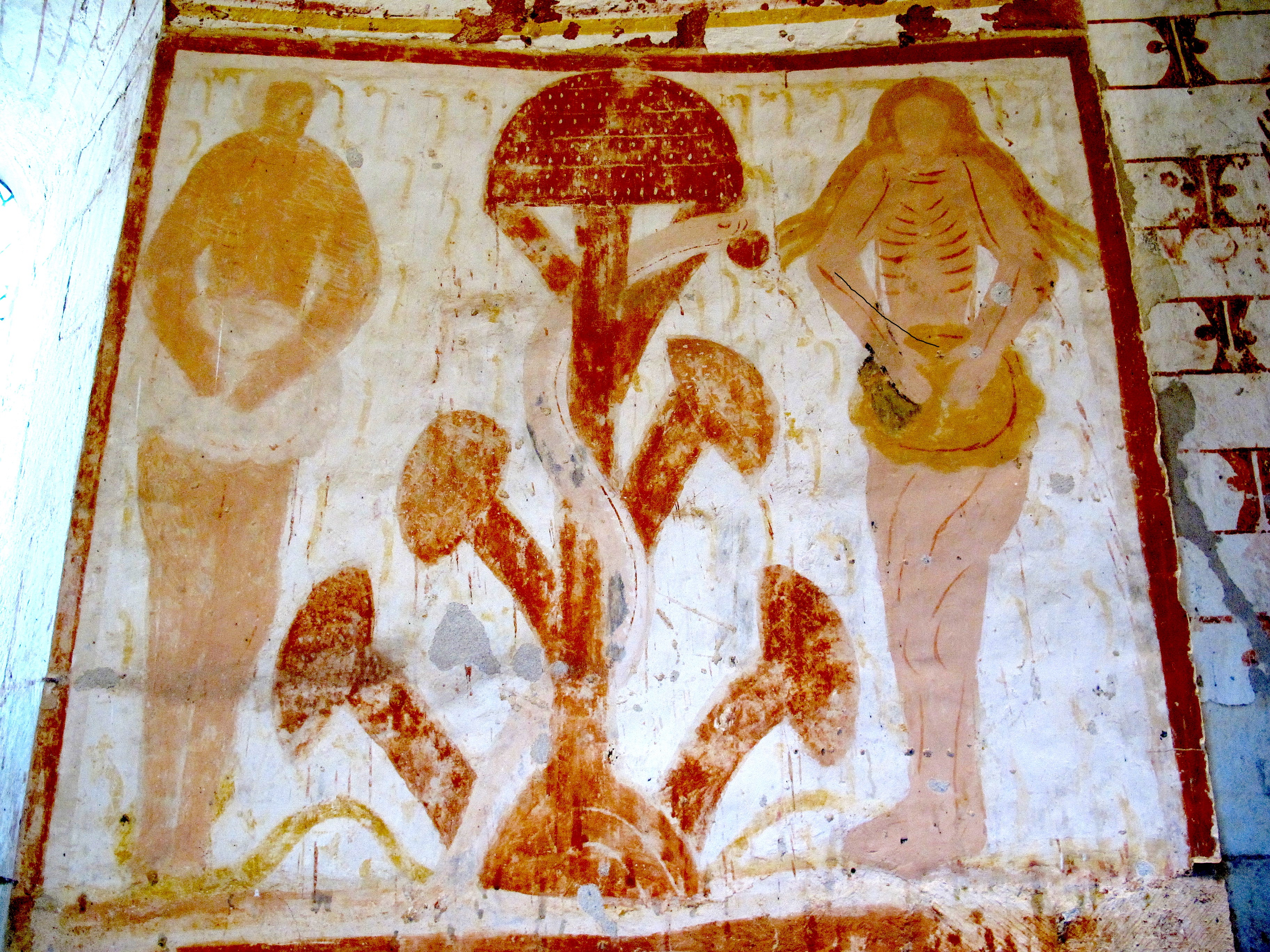
One of the chapel's frescos

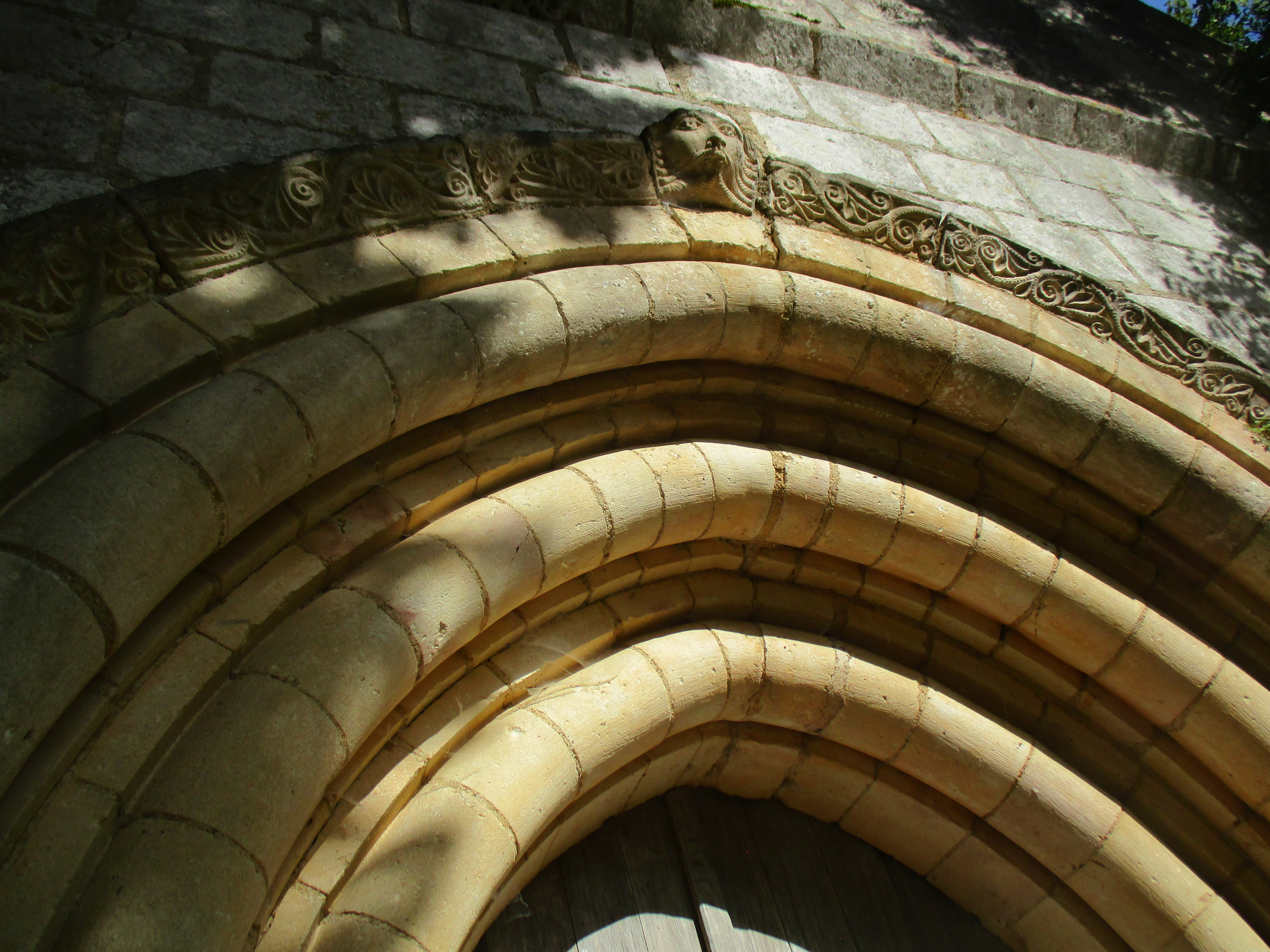
Entrance to the chapel

== See also ==
- Abbey Church of Saint-Savin-sur-Gartempe
