= Khirbet el-'Ormeh =

Archeological site in the West Bank

- Mount Arumah, Mount Al-Arma, Mount Al-Urma
- The ruin in 2020

- Location within the West Bank
- 32°08′52″N 35°19′17″E
- Type: fortification
- Periods: Hellenistic to late Roman period
- Location: West Bank
- Grid position: 180/172 PAL

Site notes
- Height: 843 m (2,766 ft)
- Area: 30 dunam
- Public access: Yes

Khirbet el-'Ormeh (Arabic: خربة العرمة, romanized: Khirbet el-Urmah), in Hebrew Horvat Ormah (חורבת עורמה), is an archaeological site located in the West Bank, around ten kilometers southeast of the Palestinian city of Nablus. The site contains the remains of a Hasmonean-Herodian fortress consisting of a fortification wall, rectangular towers constructed in the Hellenistic style, and a series of large cisterns for storing rainwater.

The site is in Area B of the West Bank, under partial control of the State of Palestine, and has been designated as a Palestinian Heritage Site. In recent years, it has become the site of a conflict between Israeli settlers and Palestinians. According to an investigation in 2021 by Israeli website Yedioth Ahronoth, part of the site has been damaged or dismantled by the Palestinian Authority. A new mosque ("mosque of the martyrs") and a solar power system have been built nearby.

== Location ==
Khirbet el-'Ormeh is situated atop a hill known as Mount Al-Arma or Mount Al-Urma (Arabic: جبل العرمة, romanized: Jebel el-Urmah), on an altitude of 843 meters above sea level. It is located about 1.5 km northwest of the Palestinian town of Aqraba, and southeast of the Israeli settlement of Itamar.

In the 1995 Oslo Accords, the site was classified as Area B (Palestinian civil control and joint Israeli-Palestinian security control).

== Biblical identification ==
Khirbet el-'Ormeh is commonly identified with Arumah, a biblical toponym mentioned in the Book of Judges (9:41): "Then Abimelek stayed in Arumah, and Zebul drove Gaal and his clan out of Shechem." The reference is in the context of story describing a local revolt against Abimelech, the king of Shechem and the son of judge Gideon.

== Early visits ==
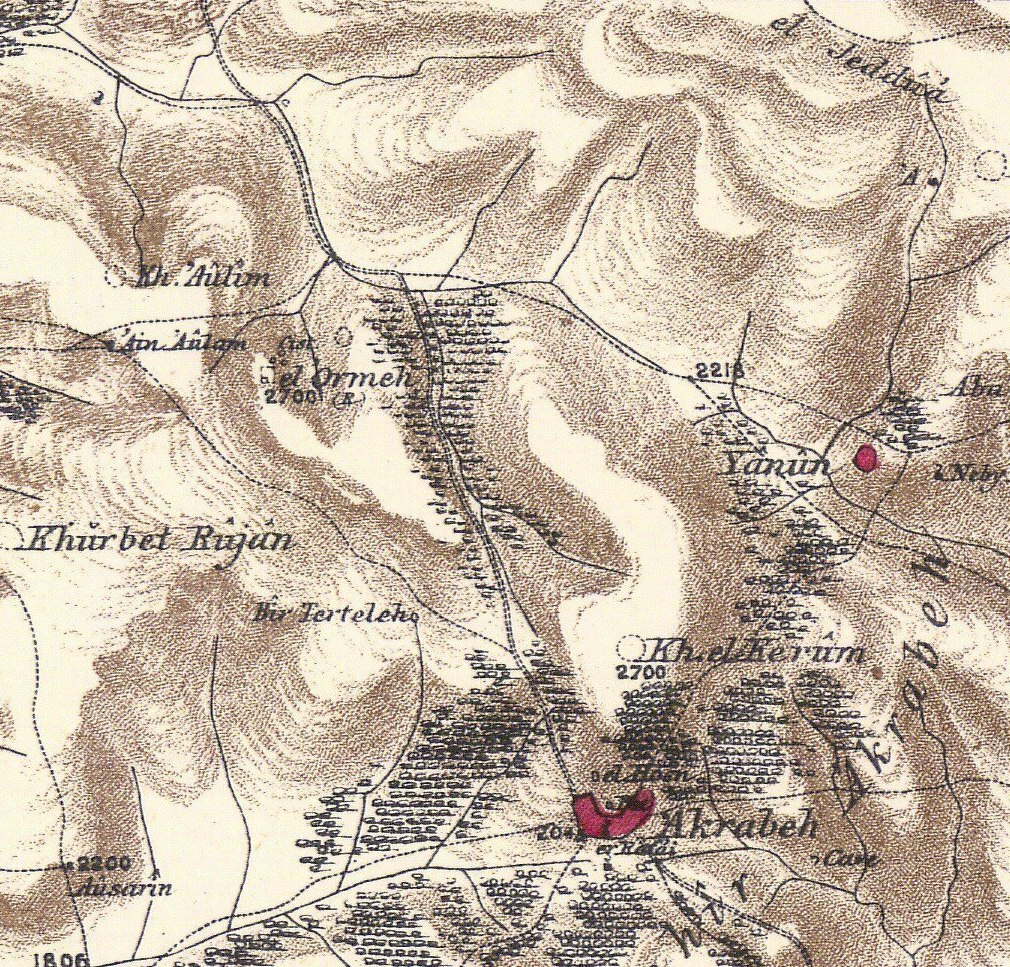
Khirbet el Ormeh, and the villages or Aqraba and Yanun, c.1880, PEF Survey of Palestine

In 1851-2 C.W.M van de Velde passed by and noted "I believe I may recognise the Arumah of Judges ix 41". The site appears on his maps of Palestine and Jerusalem. In 1870 Victor Guérin visited.

In 1877 Herbert Kitchener of the Palestine Exploration Fund travelled in the area as part of the PEF expedition which led to the publication of The Survey of Western Palestine (SWP); see his initial report at #Description. The SWP cited C.W.M Van De Velde.

In 1881, Palmer wrote that the meaning of El Ormeh is "the dam".

== Archaeological surveys ==
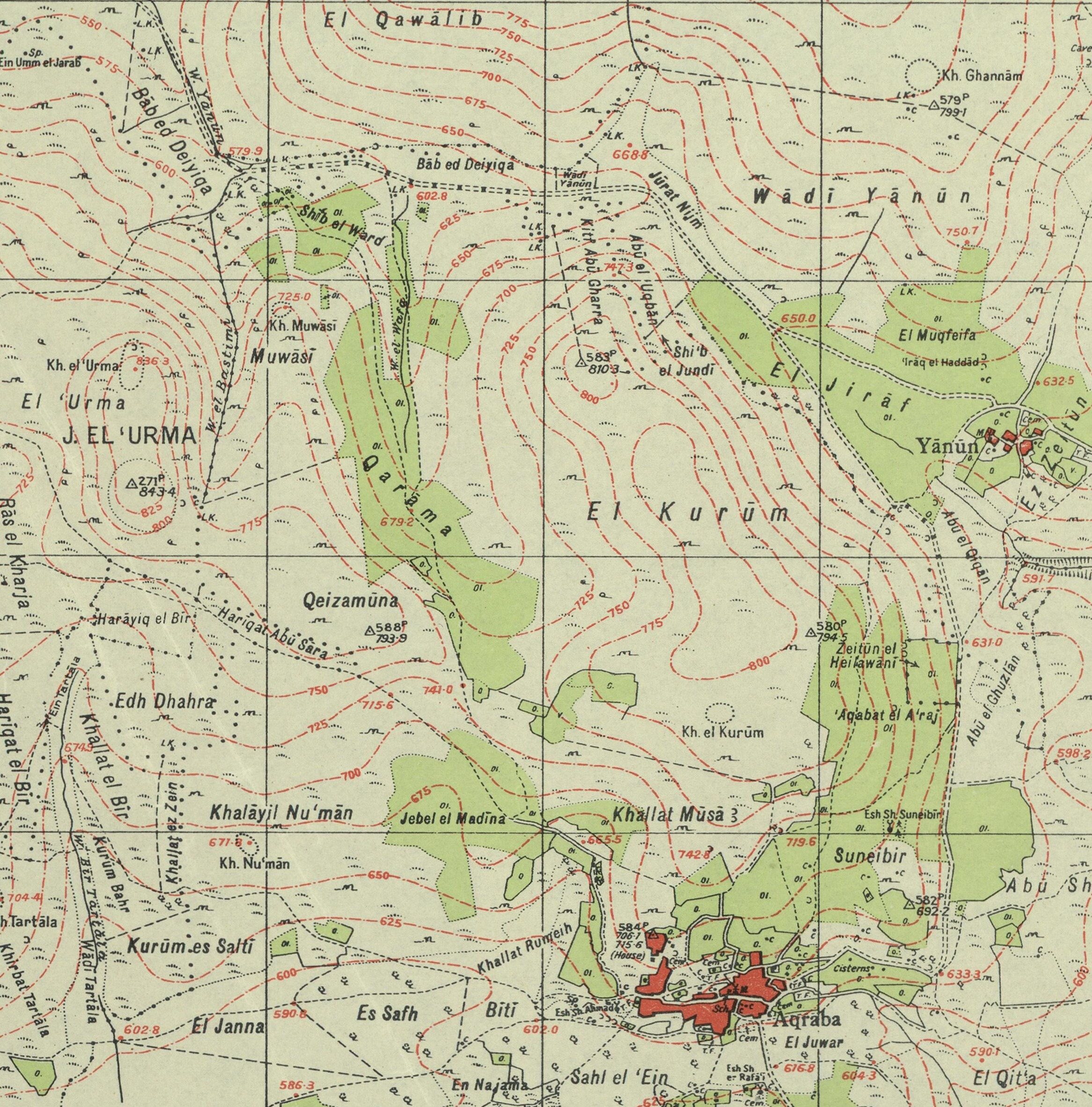
Jebel el Urma, c.1940, with the towns of Aqraba and Yanun, Survey of Palestine

As of 1988, Khirbet el-'Ormeh had not yet been excavated but had been surveyed by various teams. It was first surveyed in the 1960s by the archaeological expedition of Dro-McCormick on behalf of the American Schools of Oriental Research, and again in 1968 as part of the Archaeological Survey of Israel. Other surveys followed.

== Hasmonean-Herodian fortress ==
=== Description ===
Kitchener reported in 1878: "I rode out and examined the fine site of El'Ormah, south-east of Nablus. The position was very grand, standing high above the surrounding hills; from a distance the castle seems almost inaccessible; by approaching it from the west, however, a narrow tongue of land leads to within a little of the top. A stiff climb along rock terraces and over scarped rocks leads to the plateau on the top on which the castle was situated. The foundations of two square towers of large drafted masonry, similar to Crusading work, still guard the southern entrance; these and some cisterns and ruined houses are all that now remain; the whole area of the plateau would be about three-quarters of an acre. The rock was scarped perpendicularly on the west side; on the east and north sides the hill descended very steeply about 500 ft. to a valley; on the south a very narrow ridge led to another small round hilltop, slightly lower than the fortress, which was equally inaccessible. The place must have been one of great strength; the remains still existing do not seem to date from a period previous to the times of the Crusaders." The SWP, published in 1882, noted: "A ruined castle, on a hillock, with a spring to the west. Large caves and cisterns exist north of it. The position is very fine, commanding all the neighbourhood. The rock is scarped in places. Drafted stones occur in the corner towers, and there are traces of other ruins."

Hilltop

According to 20th-century archaeologists, Khirbet el-'Ormeh was the site of a fortress with a complex water system. The fortifications that have survived were mostly on the southern end of the summit. A glacis was discovered on the east side of the wall line, at a level lower than the top of the mound, surrounding the mound on all sides. At its bottom was a hewn shaft, which also served as a quarry for building stones. At its southern end is a fortified structure with two phases: the upper phase is built of ashlars with chiseled margins, and the lower is built of coarse construction.

=== Water system ===
Cistern

Three large cisterns have been excavated on the southwestern slope of the northern spur, each with a vertical entrance door flush with the top and steps leading down from the door sill to the floor. The southernmost of the cisterns measures 24.80 meters long, 12.05 meters wide, and 10 to 11 meters high. The others are only slightly smaller. These water facilities strongly resemble the Hasmonean and Herodian systems in Alexandrium and Hyrcania.

=== Analysis ===
Given its similarity to other known Hasmonean desert fortresses, it is likely that it was built by the Hasmoneans to guard the nearby town of Aqraba, and was later controlled by Herod. Josephus (Wars 3.3.5) mentions Acrabatta as being one of the administrative cities in Roman Judea, heading a toparchy. Scholars estimate that the fortress was built as part of the military campaign of John Hyrcanus or Alexander Jannaeus against the Samaritans, or to protect Jewish pilgrims heading for Jerusalem.

Following the First-Jewish Roman War, the area's importance declined, and the fortress gradually fell into disuse.

== Smaller findings ==
Potsherds found on the summit date to the Middle Bronze Age (II), the Late Bronze Age (I-II), the early Iron Age I (dominant) and Iron II periods as well as the Roman and Byzantine periods. In the large building on the summit, potsherds from the Hellenistic and Roman periods were uncovered, along with some Byzantine sherds. Hellenistic-style store-jars and a cooking pot were found in the building on the eastern side, along with ceramics dating from Iron Age (I-II), and a fragment of Roman terra sigillata pottery in the vicinity. Persian period ceramics were also found at the site.

In October 1984, nine Demetrius II coins dating from 146 to 138 BCE were found on the western and northern slopes of Khirbet el-'Ormeh. The site also contained a coin minted by John Hyrcanus as well as seven pieces minted by his son and successor Alexander Jannaeus.

== Tombs ==
Several rock-cut tombs are also found nearby.

== Post-Roman history ==
The site continued to be inhabited intermittently into the Late Islamic period.

An Ottoman endowment deed of Hasseki Sultan's imaret in Jerusalem (1552) records the place name Manzalat al-ʽrmwy’t /Manzilit il-ʽUrmawiyāt/, “the camping ground of the ‘Urmawis (residents of 'Urma)", near Beit Liqya. The place-name possibly carries the name of people originally from Khirbet el-'Ormeh.

== Recent conflict and destruction ==
According to Israeli newspaper Makor Rishon, the site's destruction began in 2009, when Palestinians began using tractors and other heavy tools on the ancient site. In 2018, Israeli activity around the site began to increase, following expansion of the nearby settlement of Itamar. In early 2020, the Palestinian National Authority declared the hill a Palestinian Heritage Site, installing generators and perimeter lighting, and erecting a tent alongside a flag. According to the Palestinian government, "Israeli settlers falsely claim that Mount 'Orma holds biblical importance as a pretext to take over the strategic hilltop."

A campaign by Israeli settlers to “liberate Tel Aroma” began in February 2020. An Israeli NGO, Shomrim al HaNetzach ('Guardians of Eternity', an offshoot of Regavim), organized a tour of the site in protest of what, according to its leaders, is deliberate destruction of the site by the Palestinian Authority. Palestinians from the nearby town of Beita responded by staging daily sit-ins atop the hill. In March 2020, these events turned into clashes between Palestinians and the Israeli Defense Forces (IDF), in which 22-year-old Palestinian Islam Dweikat was killed. In April 2020, 14 Palestinians were wounded and Mohammed Abdulkarim Khassab Hamayel, a 15-year-old Palestinian, was shot and killed. According to the IDF, about 500 Palestinians took part in the clashes, "throwing stones at IDF soldiers and burning tires."

According to an investigation in 2021 by Israeli website Yedioth Ahronoth, part of the site has been damaged or dismantled by the Palestinian Authority. Several ancient structures were destroyed and part of the Hasmonean-period wall was demolished. Several Israeli media outlets reported that the site was used to build a new mosque ("mosque of the martyrs") and a solar power system was built nearby.

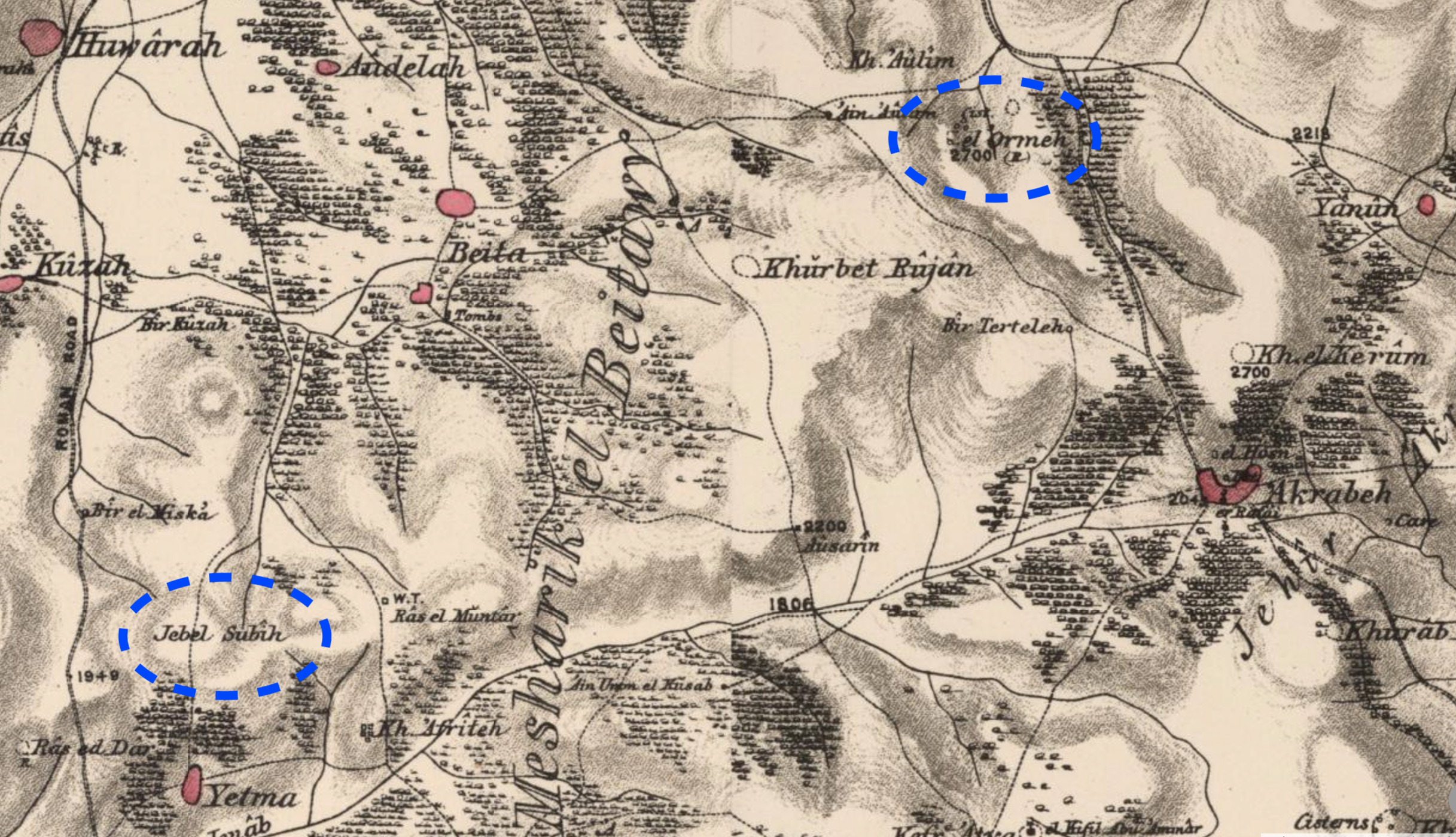
Jabal El 'Urma and Jabal Sabih in 1880

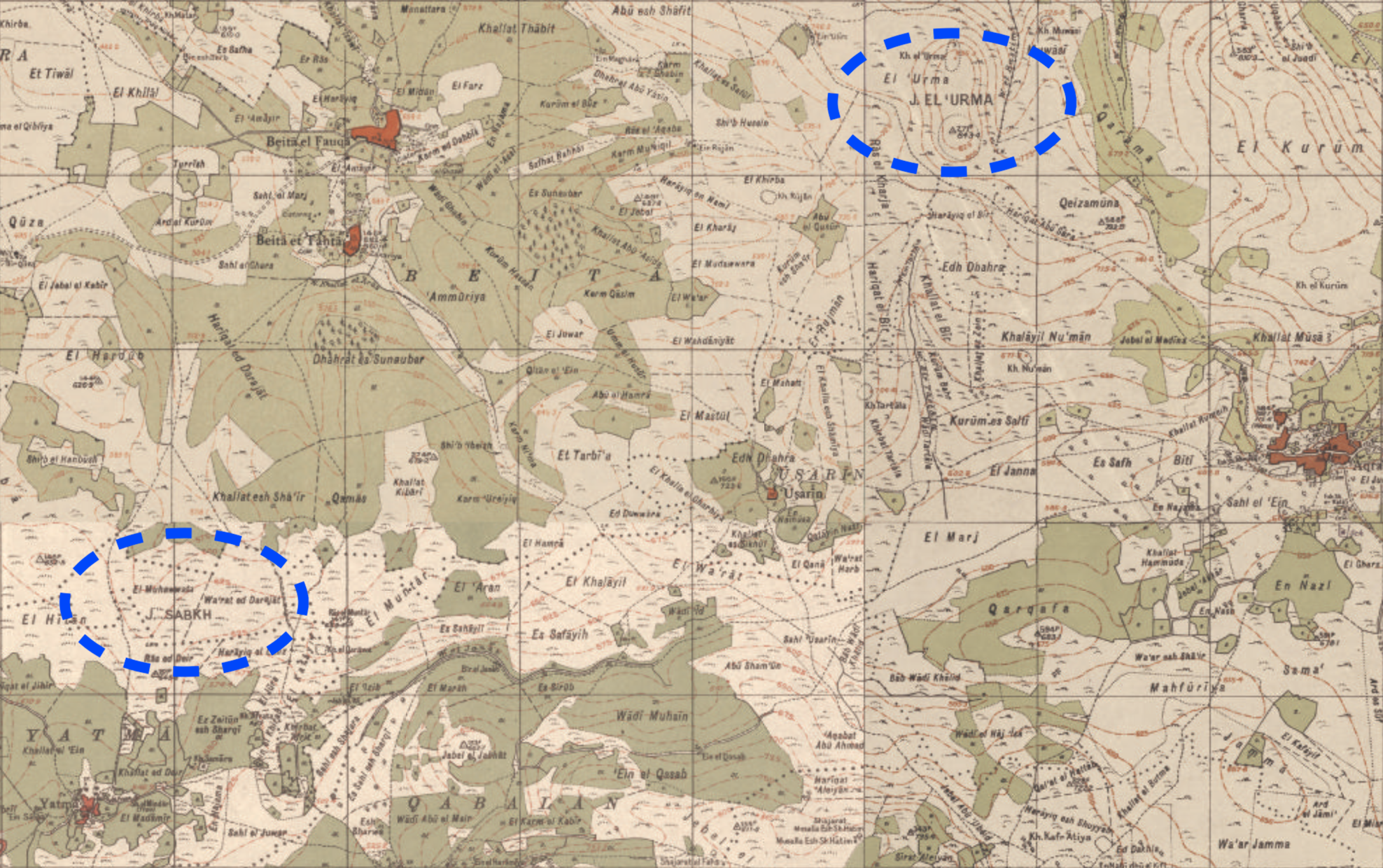
Jabal El 'Urma and Jabal Sabih in 1940

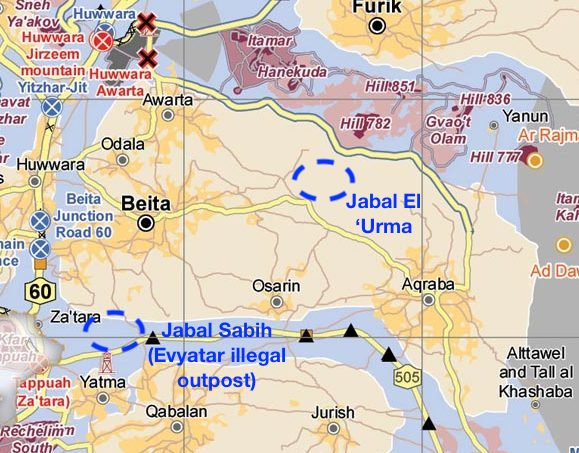
Jabal El 'Urma and Jabal Sabih in 2018

Archaeological remains, 2020

Tomb entrance

Aerial view, 2023

== See also ==
- Levantine archaeology

Hasmonean desert fortresses

- Alexandreion/Alexandrion/Alexandrium
- Cypros (fortress)
- Dok/Doq (Dagon) on the Mount of Temptation
- Hyrcania (fortress)
- Machaerus
- Masada (according to Josephus; not confirmed archaeologically

== Bibliography ==
- Conder, C.R.; Kitchener, H.H. (1882). The Survey of Western Palestine: Memoirs of the Topography, Orography, Hydrography, and Archaeology. Vol. 2. London: Committee of the Palestine Exploration Fund.
- Guérin, V. (1875). Description Géographique Historique et Archéologique de la Palestine (in French). Vol. 2: Samarie, pt. 2. Paris: L'Imprimerie Nationale.
- Kitchener, H.H. (1878). "Journal of the Survey". Quarterly Statement - Palestine Exploration Fund. 10: 62–67.
- Palmer, E.H. (1881). The Survey of Western Palestine: Arabic and English Name Lists Collected During the Survey by Lieutenants Conder and Kitchener, R. E. Transliterated and Explained by E.H. Palmer. Committee of the Palestine Exploration Fund.
- Velde, van de, C.W.M. (1854). Narrative of a journey through Syria and Palestine in 1851 and 1852. Vol. 2. William Blackwood and son.
