= Arumah =

Biblical toponym mentioned in the Book of Judges

Arumah a biblical toponym mentioned in the Book of Judges (9:41): "Then Abimelek stayed in Arumah, and Zebul drove Gaal and his clan out of Shechem." The reference is in the context of story describing a local revolt against Abimelech, the king of Shechem by Gaal the son of Ebed.

== Possible locations ==
=== Duma ===
It has been suggested that Arumah was located at Duma, Nablus.

=== Khirbet el-'Ormeh ===
Charles William Meredith van de Velde passed by Khirbet el-'Ormeh in 1851/2, and noted "I believe I may recognise the Arumah of Judges ix 41".

== Bibliography ==
- Velde, van de, C.W.M. (1854). Narrative of a journey through Syria and Palestine in 1851 and 1852. Vol. 2. William Blackwood and son.
