= Woman of Thebez =

Character in the Hebrew Bible's Book of Judges

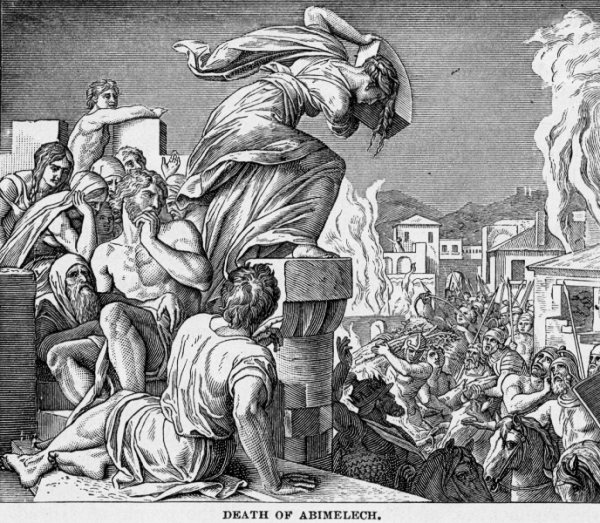
Illustration of the woman of Thebez dropping the millstone on Abimelech, from Charles Foster, The Story of the Bible, 1884.

The woman of Thebez is a character in the Hebrew Bible, appearing in the Book of Judges. She dropped a millstone from a wall in order to kill Abimelech.

Abimlech had laid siege to Thebez and entered the city. The residents had fled into a citadel within the city which Abimelech planned to burn. Judges 9:53 then says: "A certain woman threw an upper millstone upon Abimelech's head, and crushed his skull."

Herbert Lockyer calls this woman "an obscure daughter of Israel, who was to become the instrument of heaven to punish a sinner too bold and wicked to live." He goes on to say: "Alas, there was no one to record the name and sing the praise of this heroine who must have received the gratitude of the now liberated people of the city!"

Carole R. Fontaine sees this woman as an example of the motif of the "woman who brings death" in the Old Testament.

== See also ==
- Jael
