= Mount Sabih =

Mountain in Nablus

Sabih
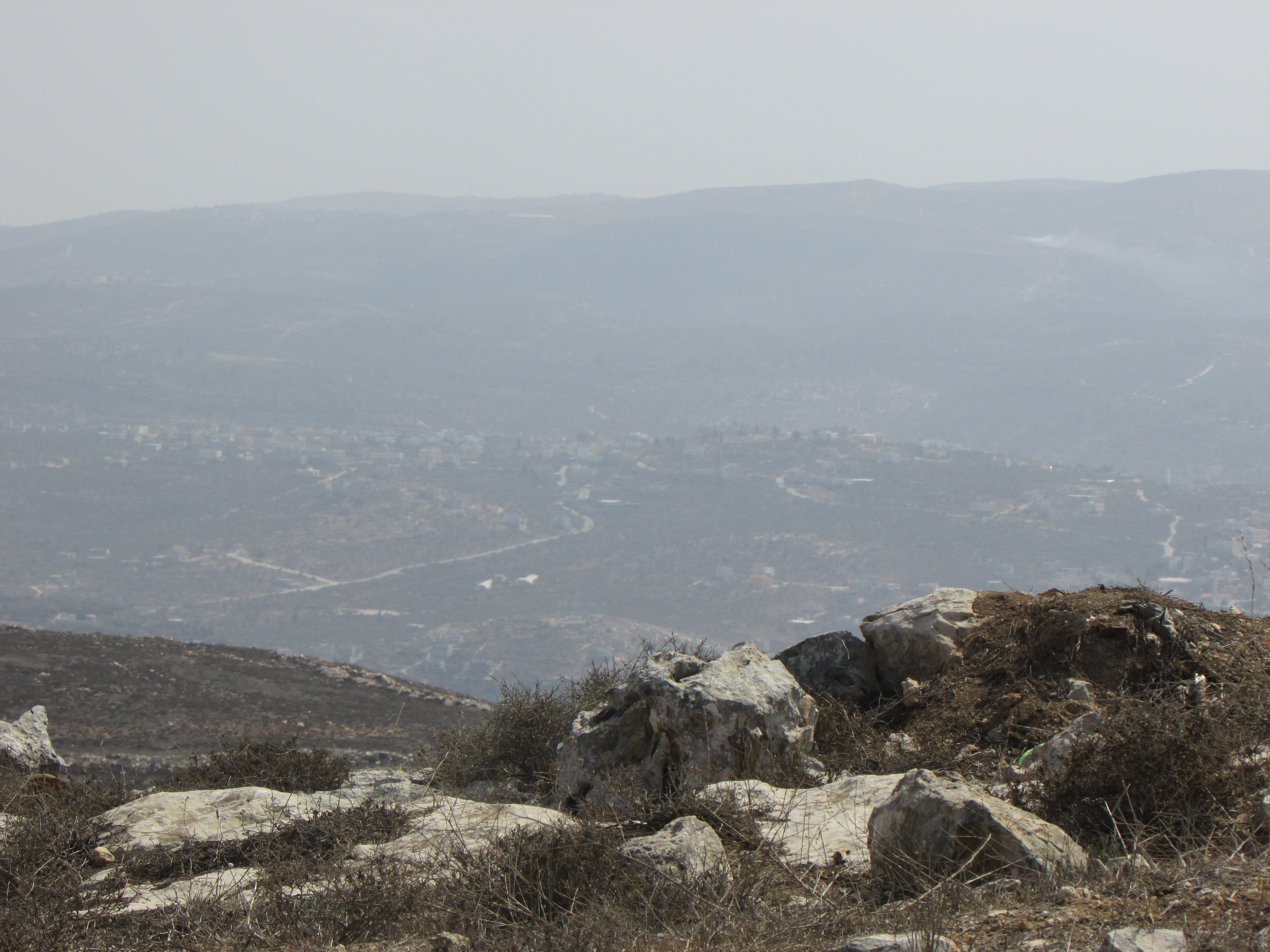

Geography
- Location within State of Palestine Location within the West Bank

Mount Sabih is a mountain located between 3 Palestinian villages, Qabalan, Yatma and Beita, south of Nablus. Mount Sabih has several peaks, the highest most southern of which was occupied in May 2021 by settlers who established an illegal Israeli outpost named Evyatar. The mountain is a natural extension of the coastal mountain range in the city of Nablus, and the mountain also belongs to the Nablus mountain range within the geography of Nablus. The height of Jabal Sabih is 570 meters.

After a compromise with the Israeli authorities stipulating that the settlers may return if the land is subsequently deemed state-owned, the settlement was vacated on 2 July 2021. On July 8, 2021, the local councils of Beita, Yatma and Qabalan and nine Palestinians from Qabalan petitioned Israel's High Court of Justice to revoke this compromise on the grounds that they hold the rights to the land. On 15 August 2021, the Israeli Supreme Court refused to consider the appeal and postponed their examination until a State Land declaration is made. In October 2021, 60 dunams (15 acres) was determined as state land and in February 2022 then-attorney general Avichai Mandelblit approved forming a legal settlement there. However nothing happened and now the settlers say that the situation will be resolved via the policies of the new government.
