= Gaal (biblical figure) =

Minor biblical character in Judges 9

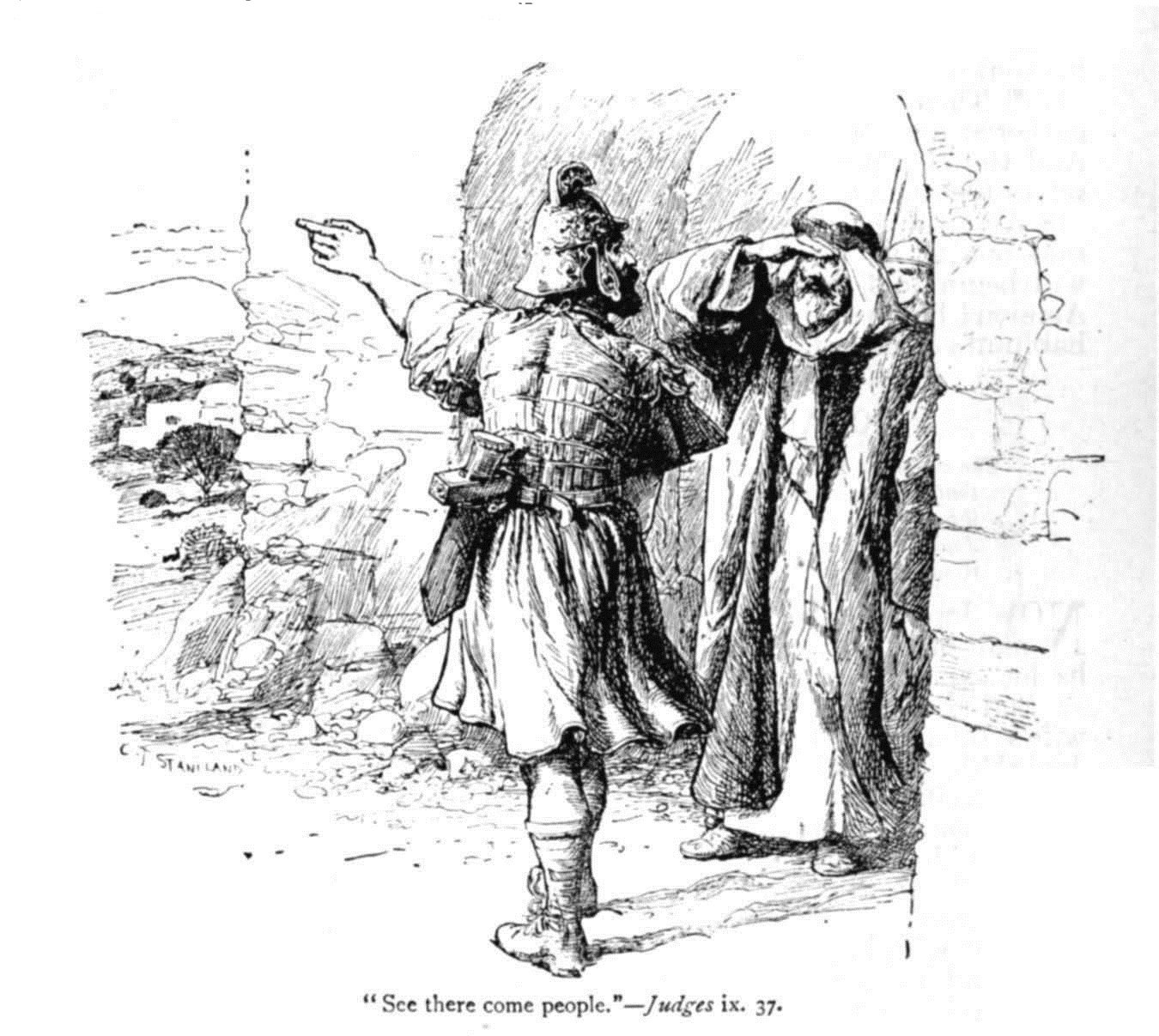
Gaal (left) points out to Zebul the approach of Abimelech's army.

Gaal (Hebrew:גַּעַל) is a minor biblical character, introduced in the 9th chapter of Judges in the Hebrew Bible as the son of Ebed or Eved, or the son of a slave. His story is told in Judges 9:26–41.

Gaal had occupied Shechem and boasted to Zebul, the ruler of Shechem, that he could defeat Abimelech. Zebul secretly warned Abimelech of Gaal's plans and offered a plan to defeat Gaal. Abimelech defeated Gaal and drove him back to the gates of Shechem. Zebul subsequently drove Gaal and his remaining kinsmen from Shechem altogether. He is not mentioned thereafter in the Bible.

Daniel I. Block suggests that he may have been one of the "Lords of Shechem" (Judges 9:23, the wording of the New Revised Standard Version and New American Bible Revised Edition) who had previously gone into exile, being unwilling to support Abimelech.
