= 1858 Van de Velde maps of Palestine and Jerusalem =

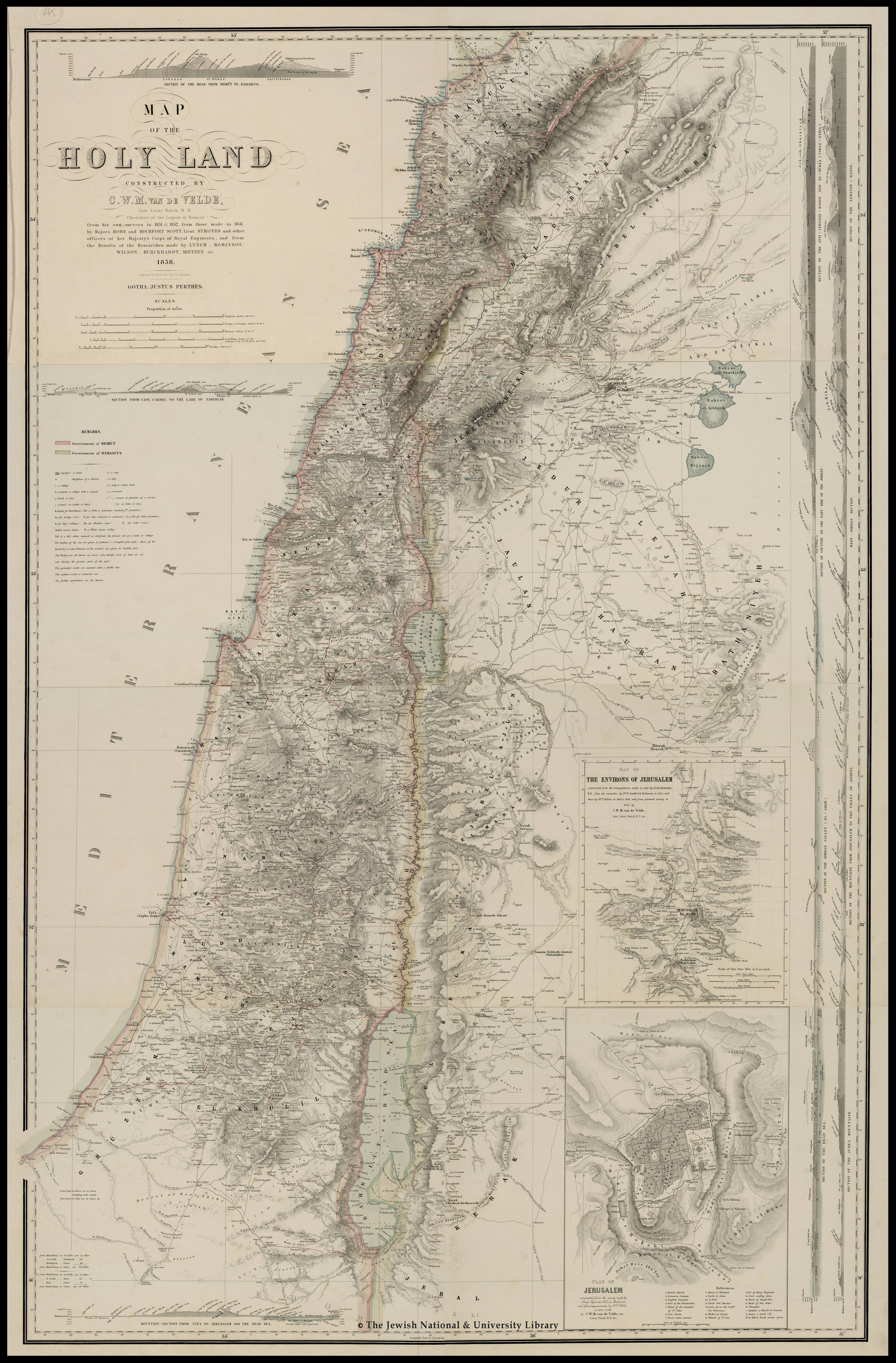
- Composite map of Palestine
- Created: 1851–52
- Author: Charles William Meredith van de Velde

The Van de Velde maps of Palestine and Jerusalem were an important scientific mapping of the region of Palestine and mapping of Jerusalem, published in 1858 by Dutch cartographer Charles William Meredith van de Velde.

== Development ==
The surveys were carried out by Van de Velde during his 1851 visit to Palestine, where he carried out various surveys, drawings, paintings and around one hundred watercolours for postcards. When he returned from his trip to Palestine, he was able to obtain the 1840 Royal Engineers’ survey data, and used this in the production of this maps. Given the known flaws in the work, Van de Velde used the Royal Engineers’ raw data to construct his map, cross-comparing the data with his work as well as all known previous geographical and cartographical knowledge.

Van de Velde met Titus Tobler in Switzerland in 1855, where they agreed to make a new map of Jerusalem based on combining Tobler's own measurements with the flawed Royal Engineers map of 1840–41. Tobler published a 26-page memoir to accompany the map.

After his trip, he held lectures on Palestine in Geneva and Lausanne.

== Publication and reception ==
Together with the maps, Van de Velde published an album of 100 lithographs of the region.

The map was published in 1858 ahead of his later Map of the Holy Land. Van de Velde carried out the work alone with a 7-inch surveyor’s compass, without theodolites (which required multiple people to operate) and without making astronomical observations (which required significant time). Despite this, his map was considered the most accurate made at the time.

Yehoshua Ben-Arieh stated that: “Ritter’s writing and Van de Velde’s map together may be considered the crowning achievements of fifty years exploration and research in the geography of Palestine.”

Faehndrich wrote that: “Van de Velde’s map represented the complete body of Western geographical knowledge on Palestine, critically compiled, then verified on site and completed by his own measurements and his own (physical) experience, including the hardships needed to make a scientific map”.

4,409 copies of the regional maps and 612 copies of the Jerusalem map were sold between 1858 and 1877.

== Gallery ==
=== Views ===
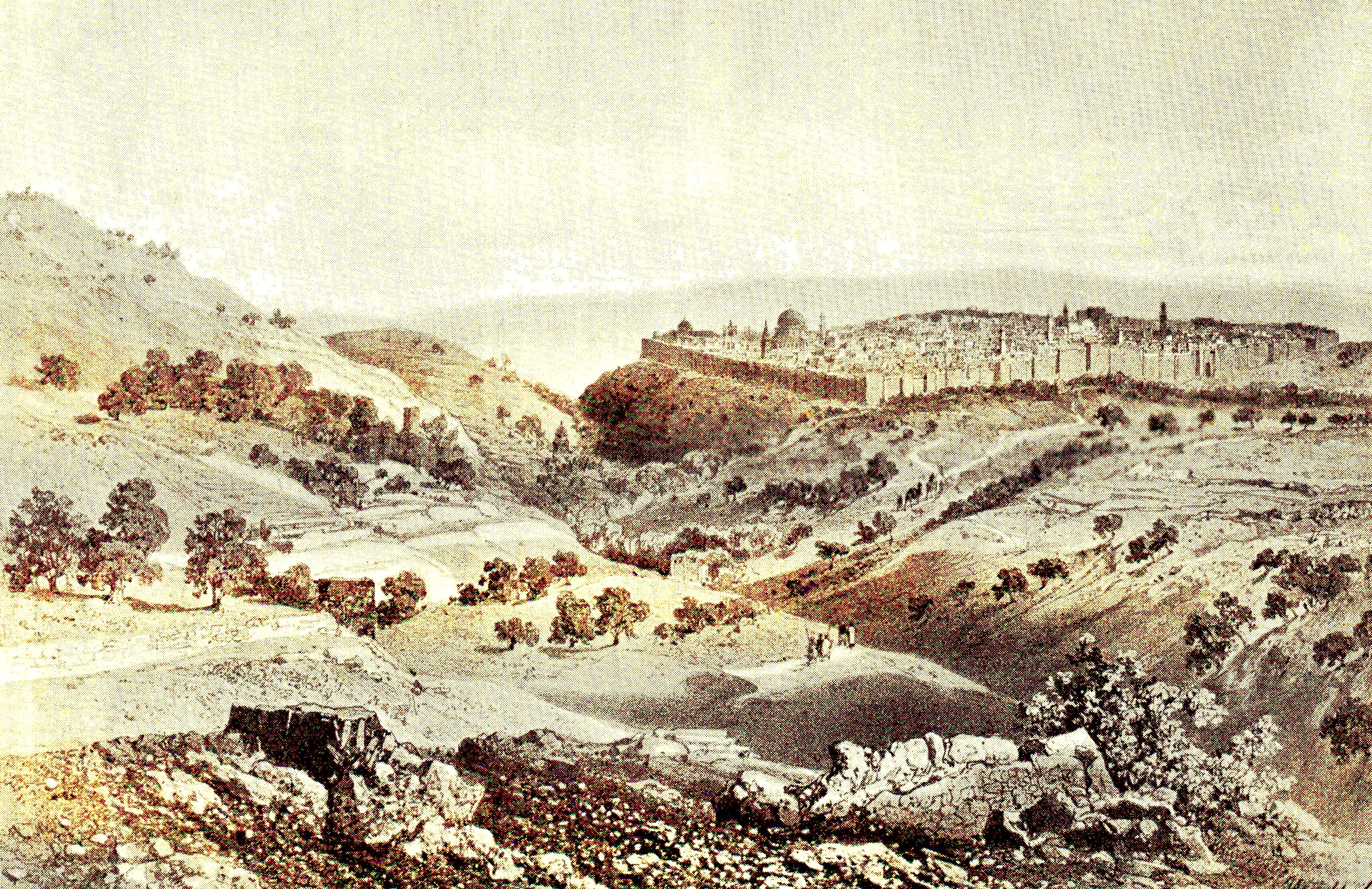
Jerusalem

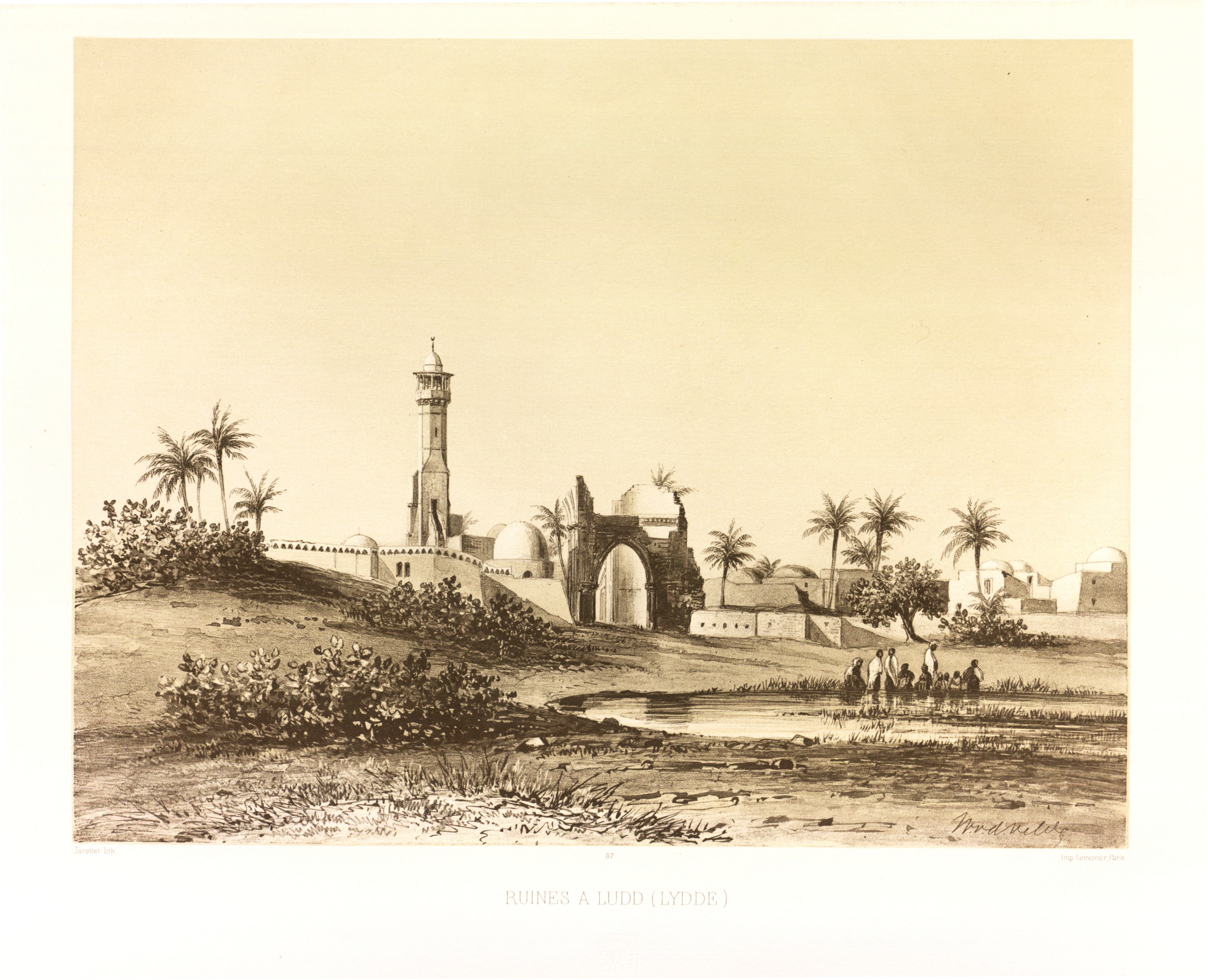
Lydda

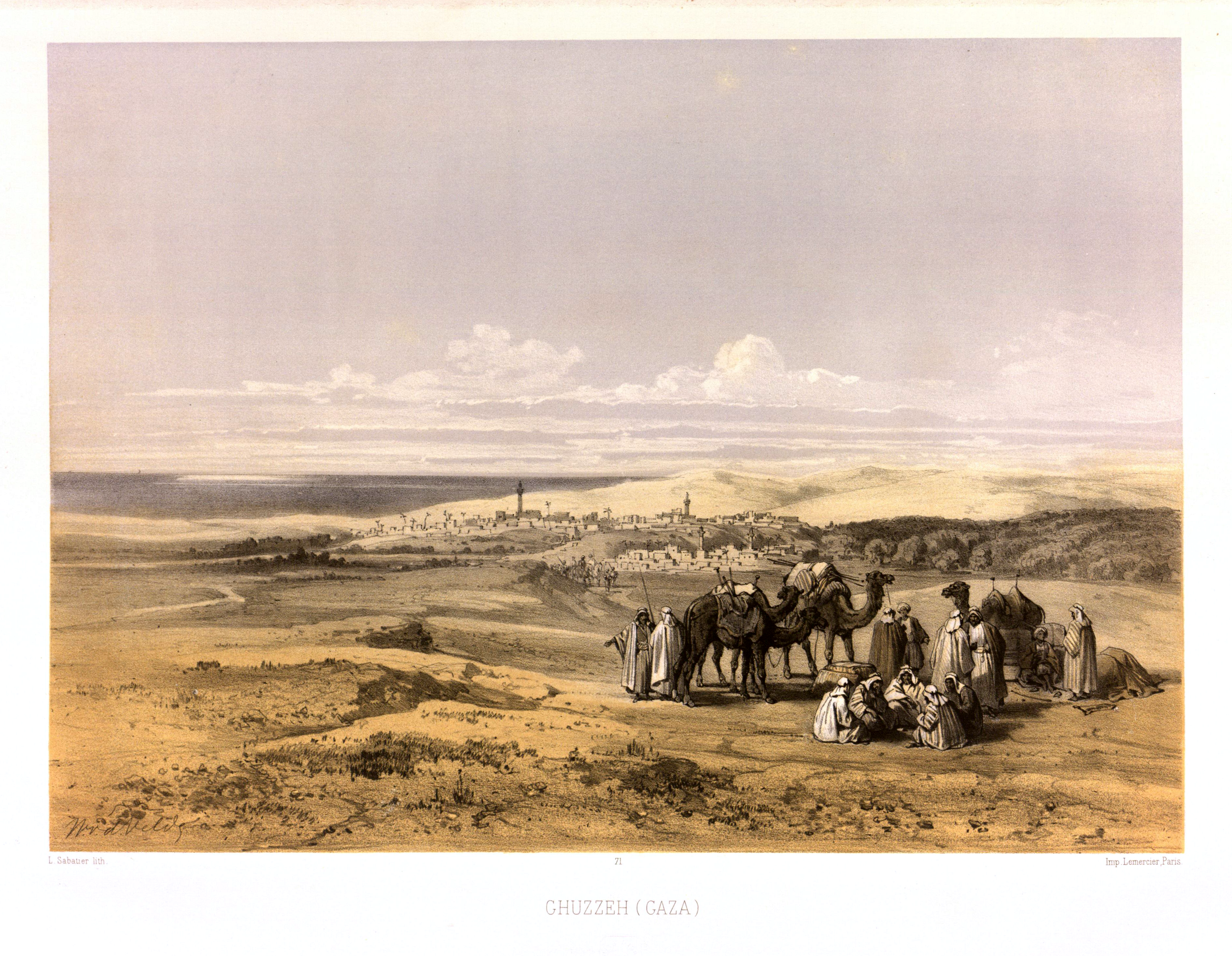
Gaza

=== Composite Maps ===
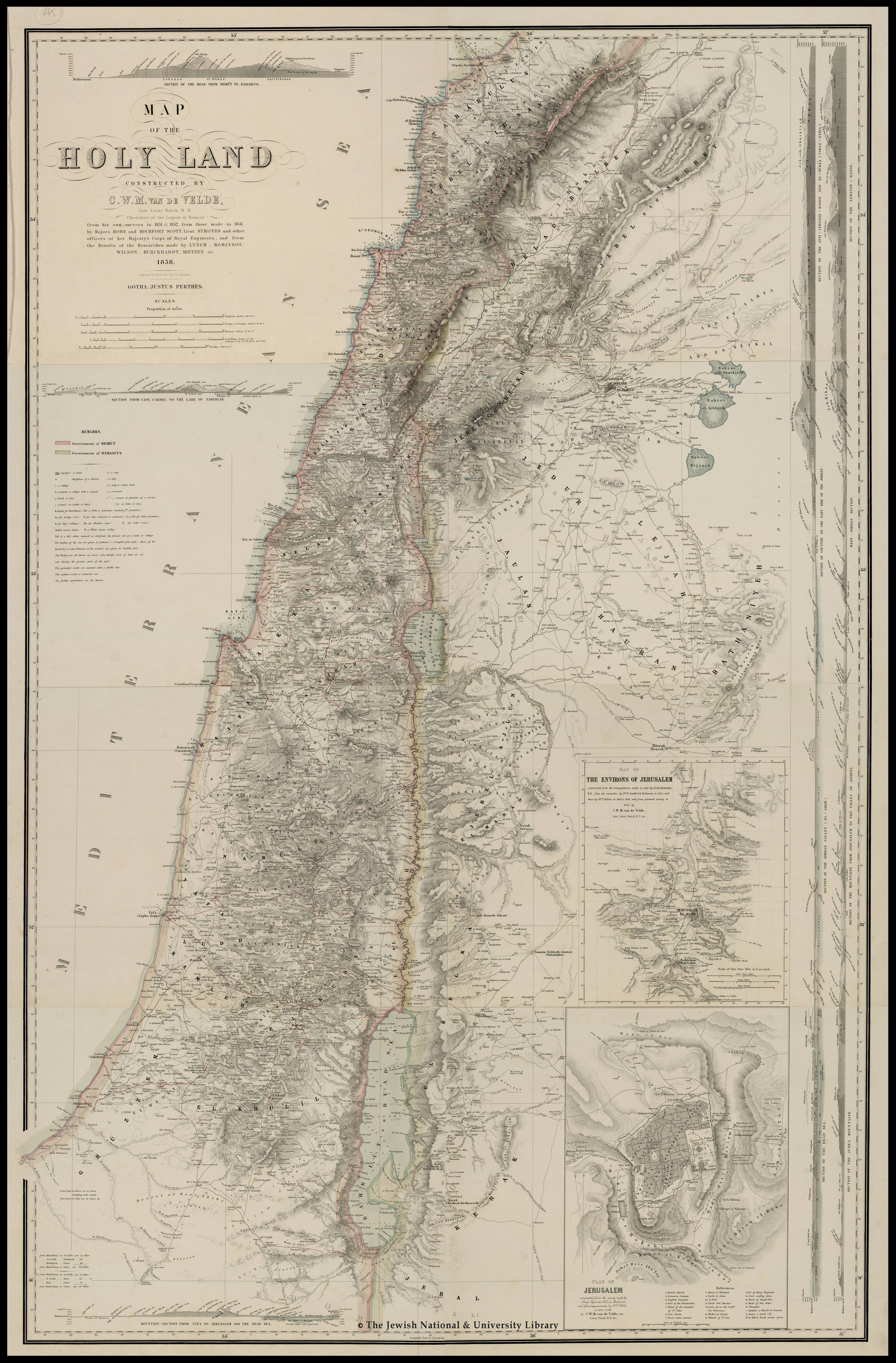

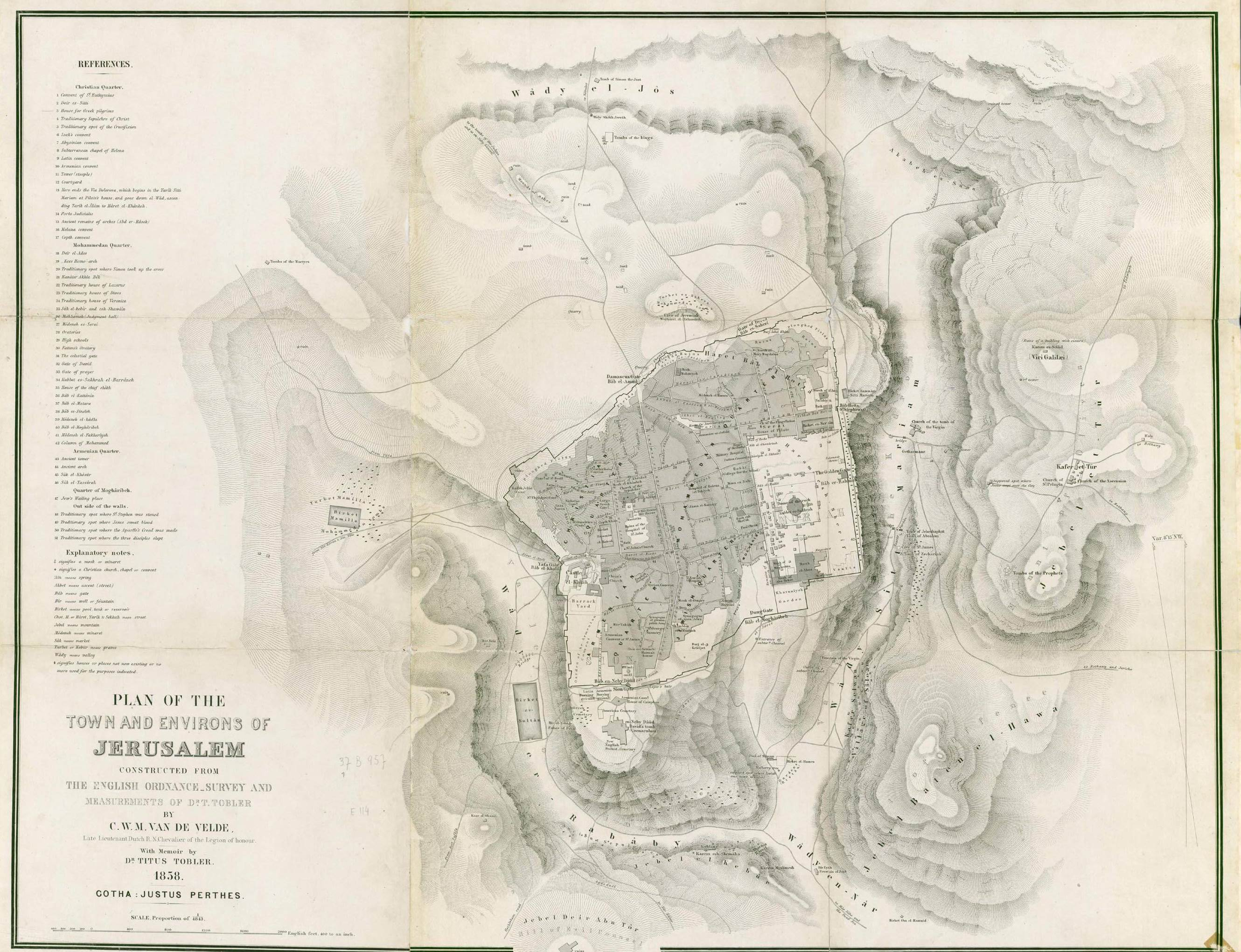

=== Regional Maps ===
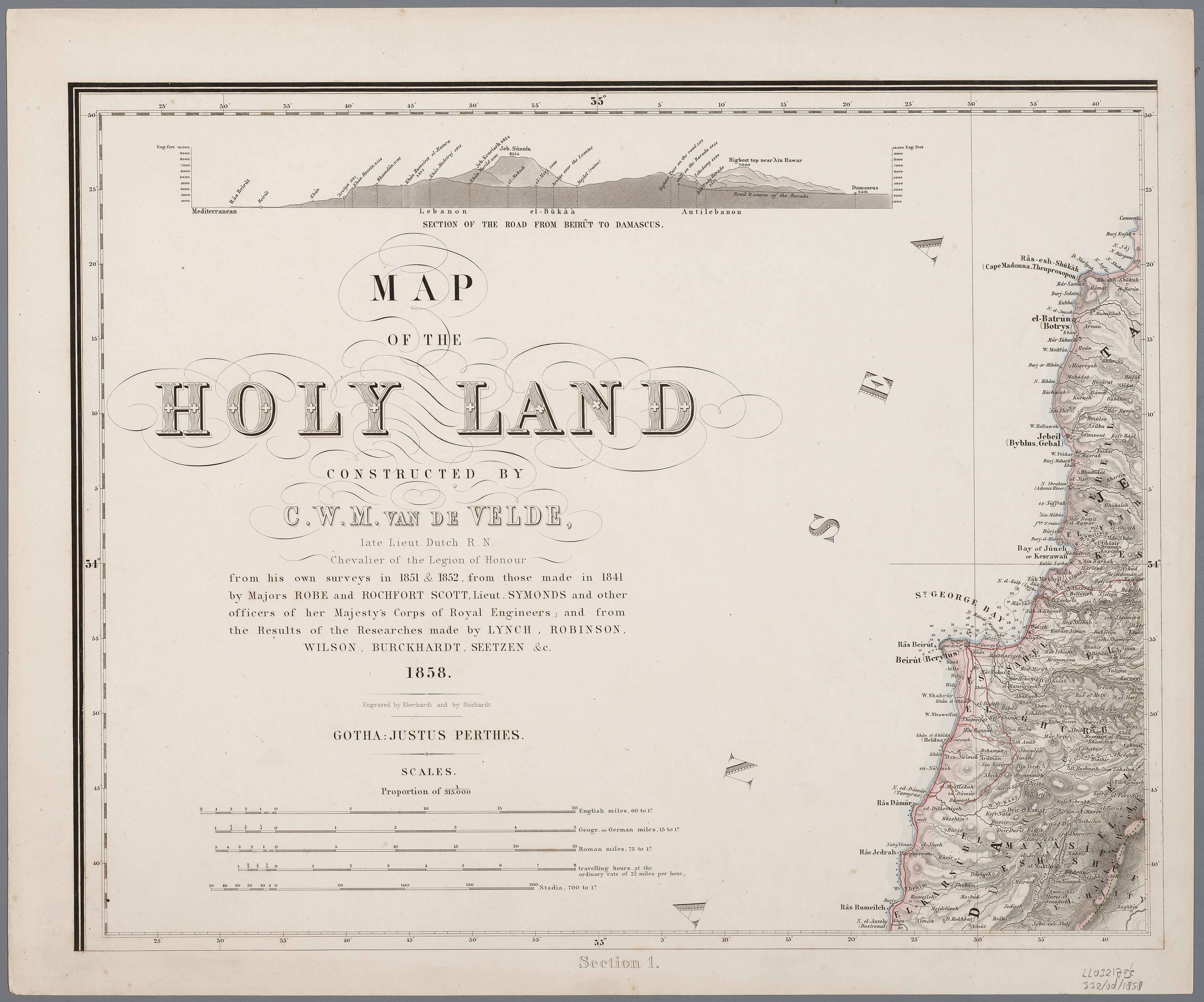
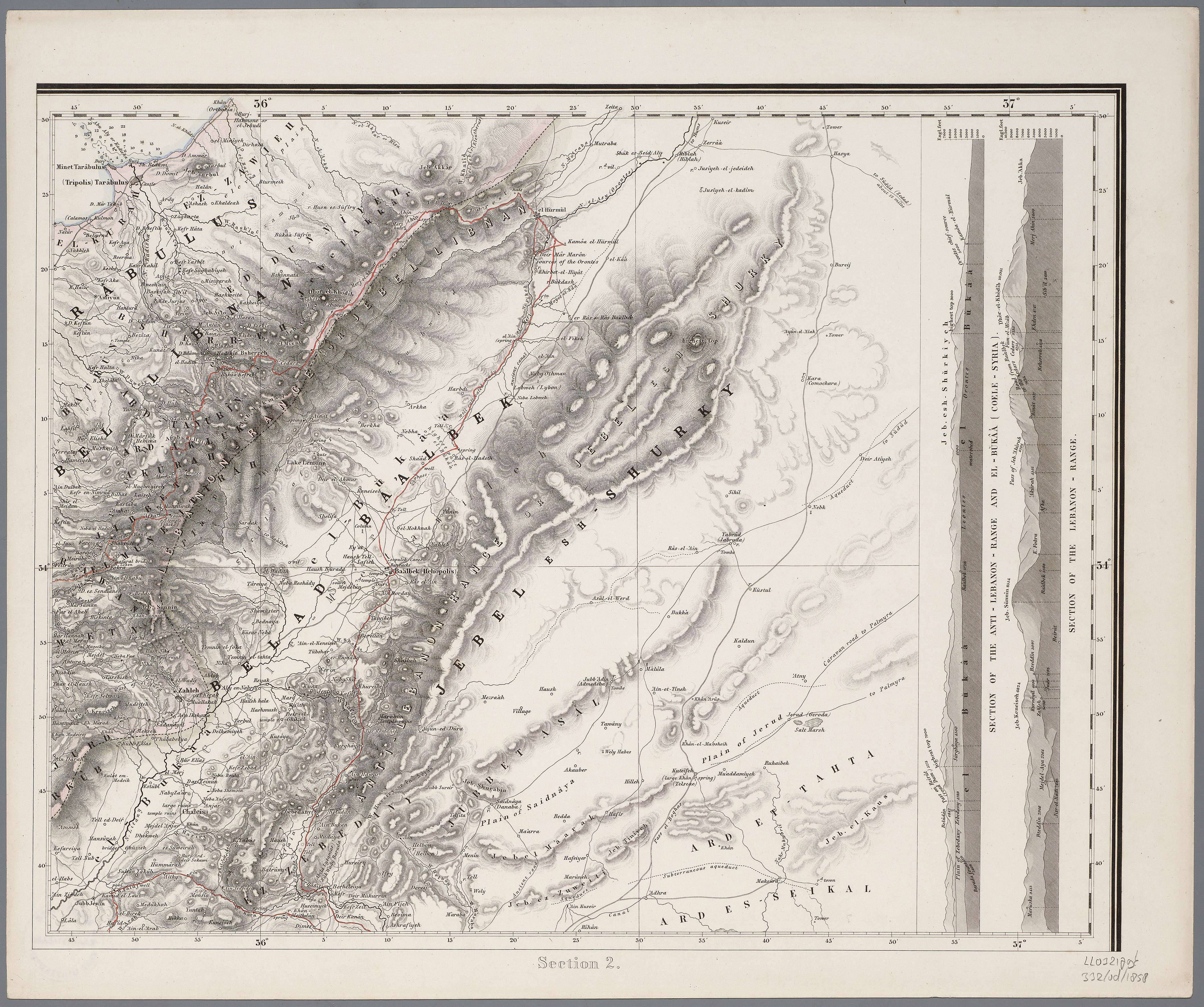
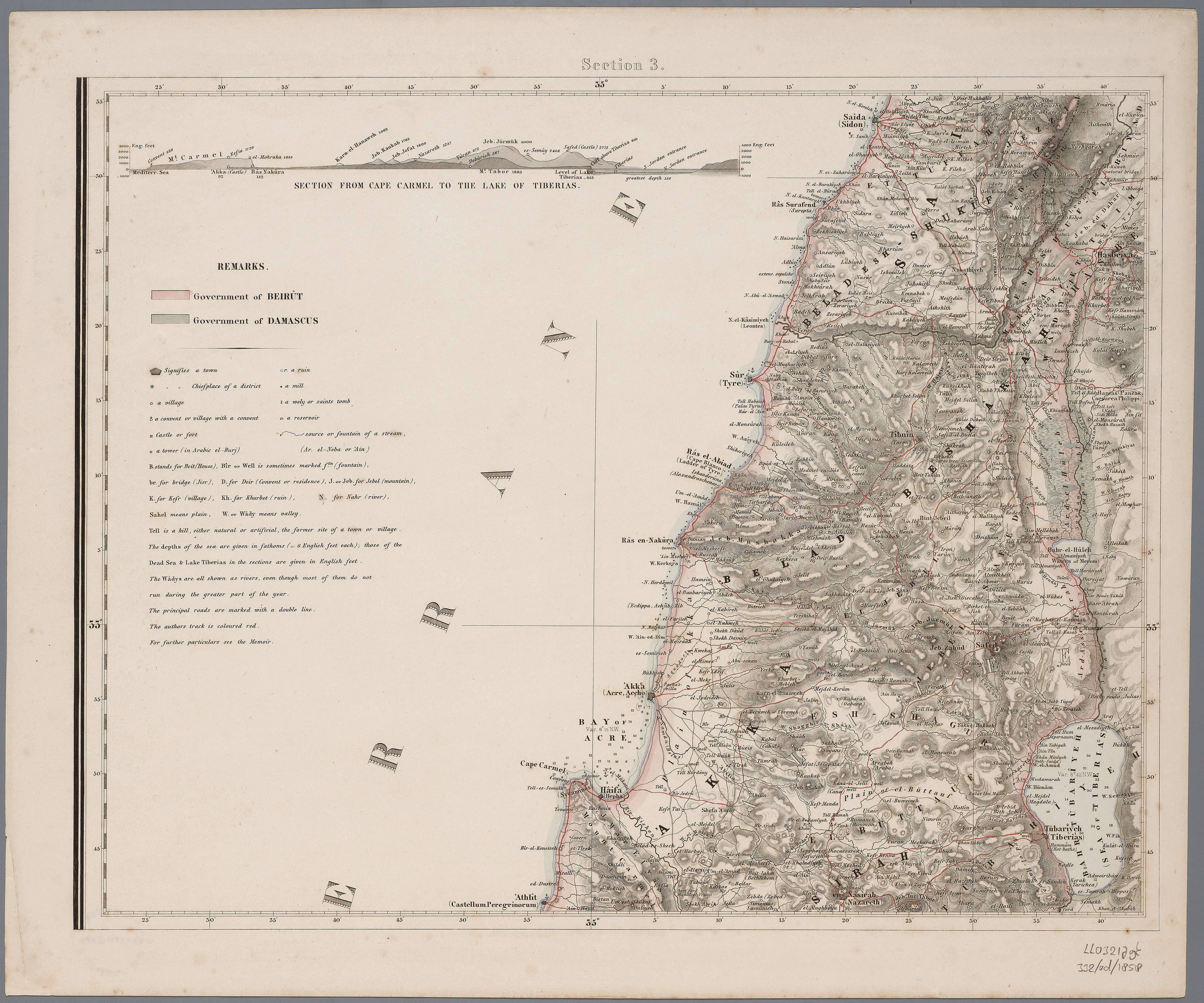
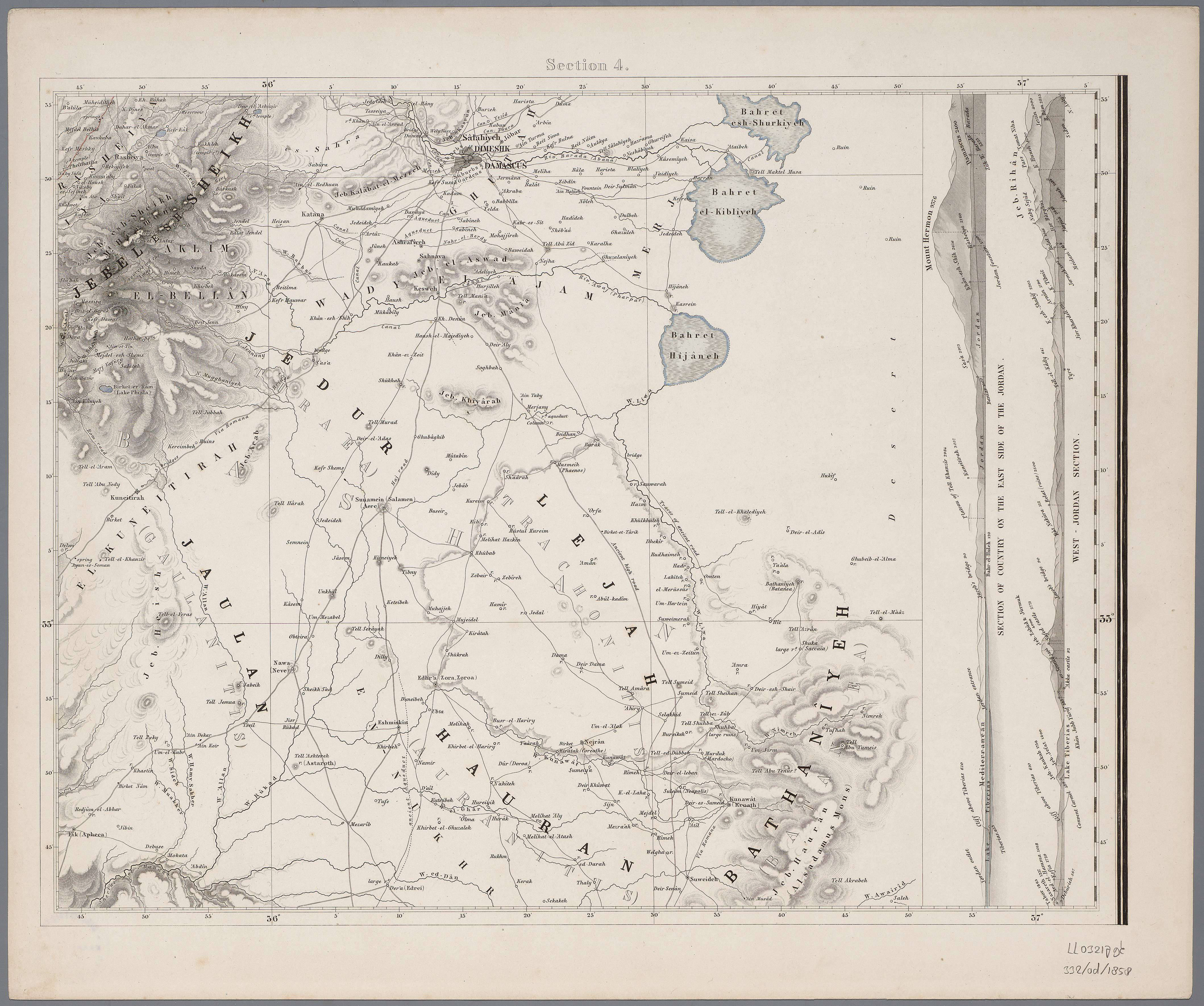
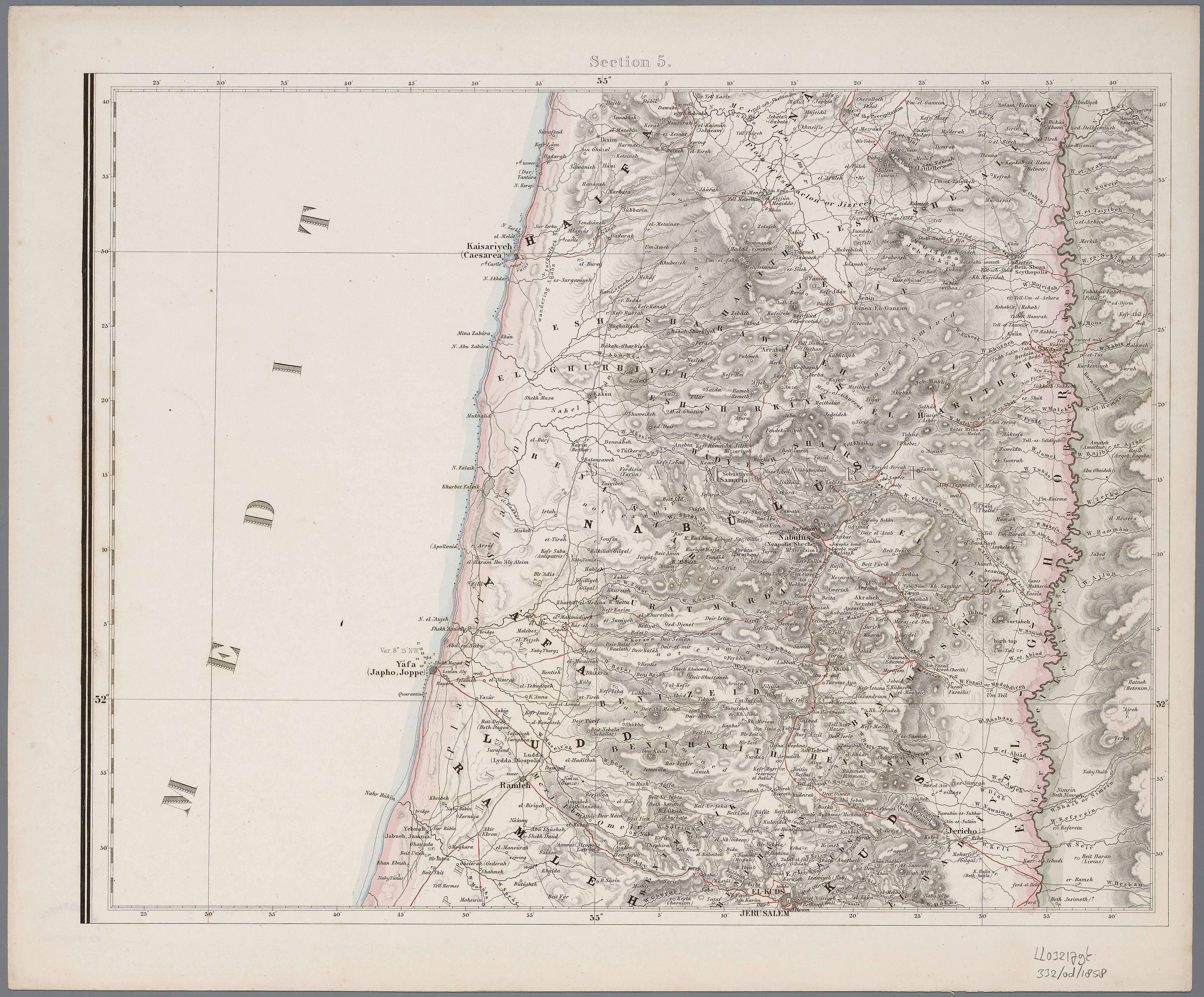
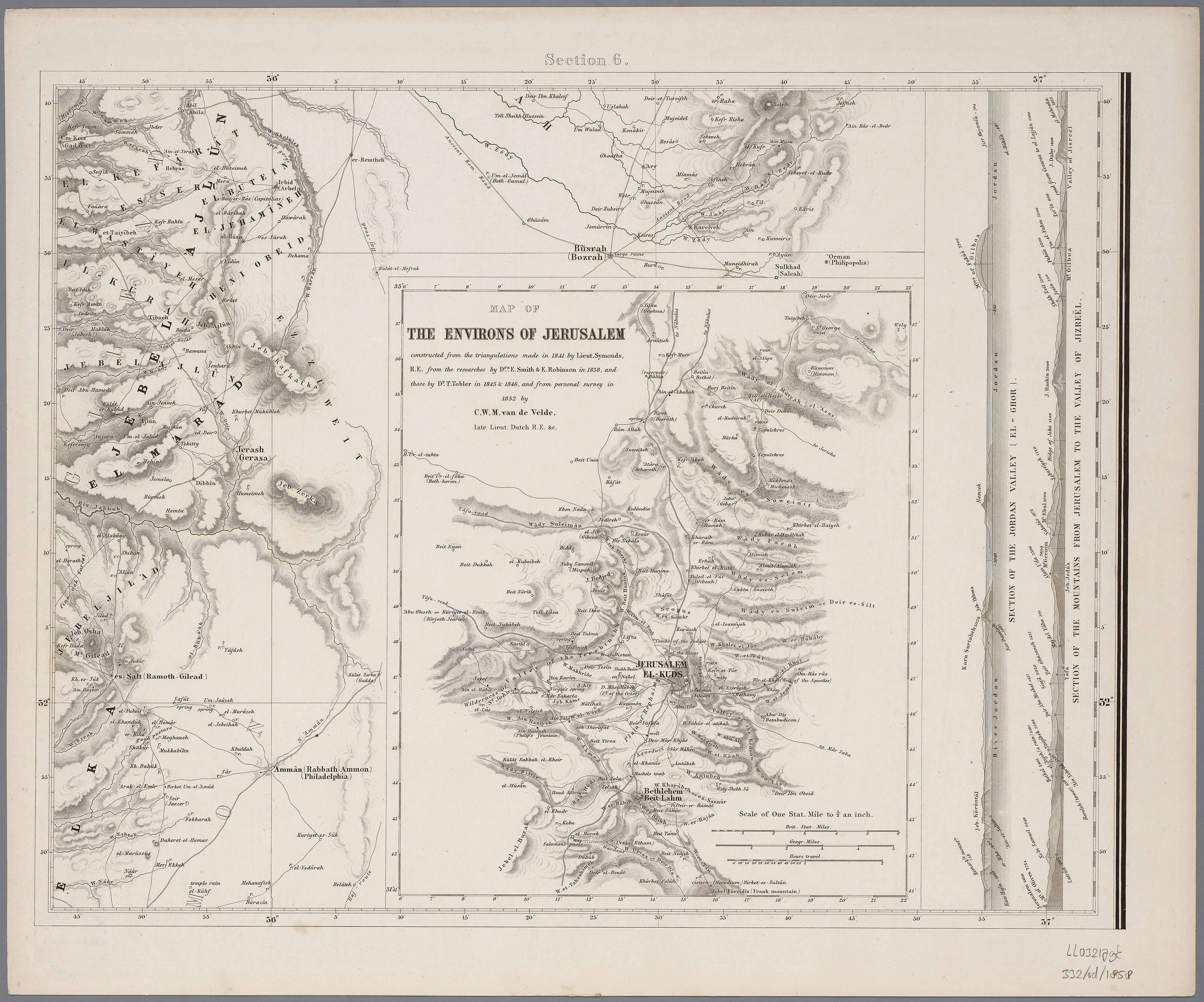
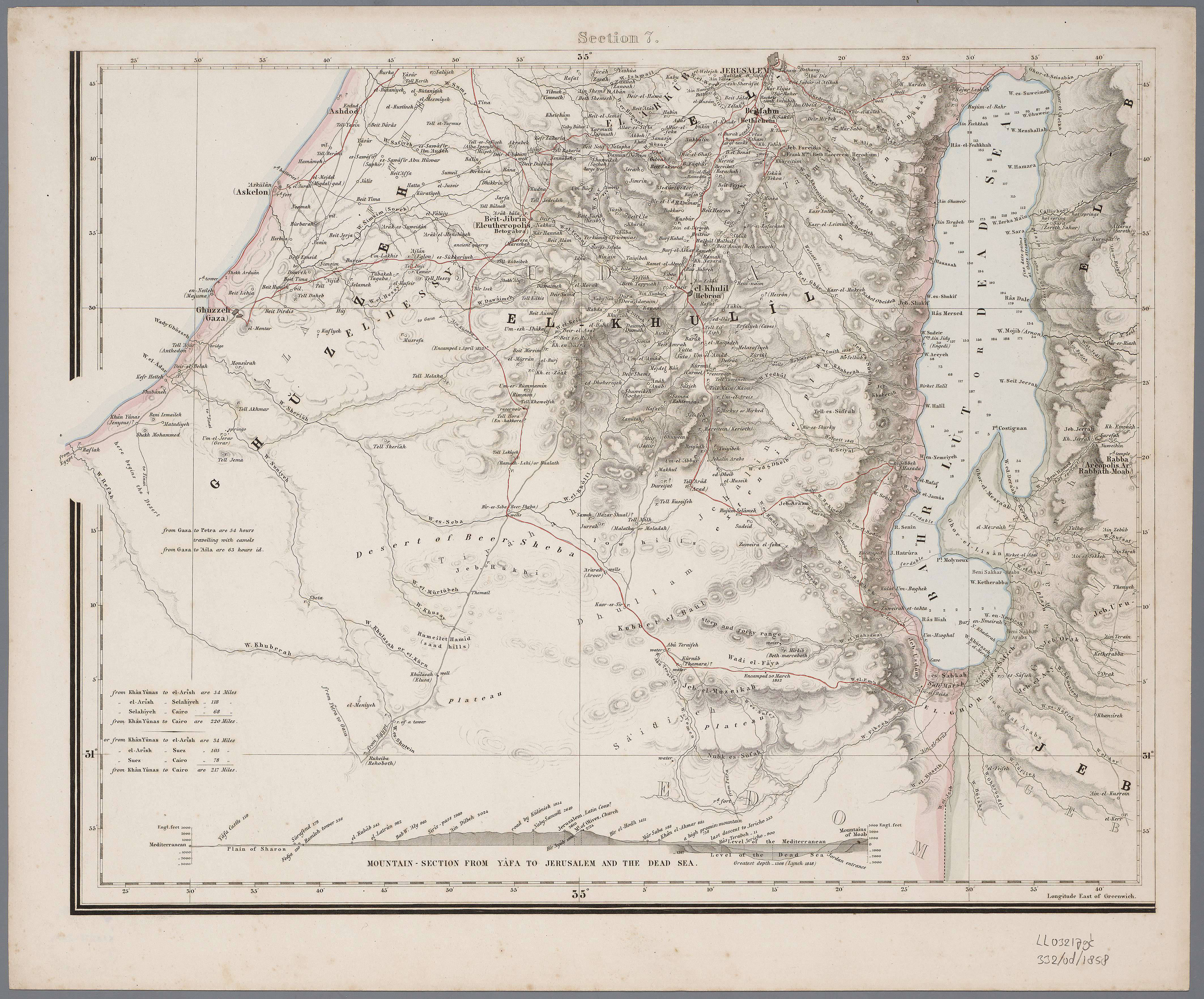
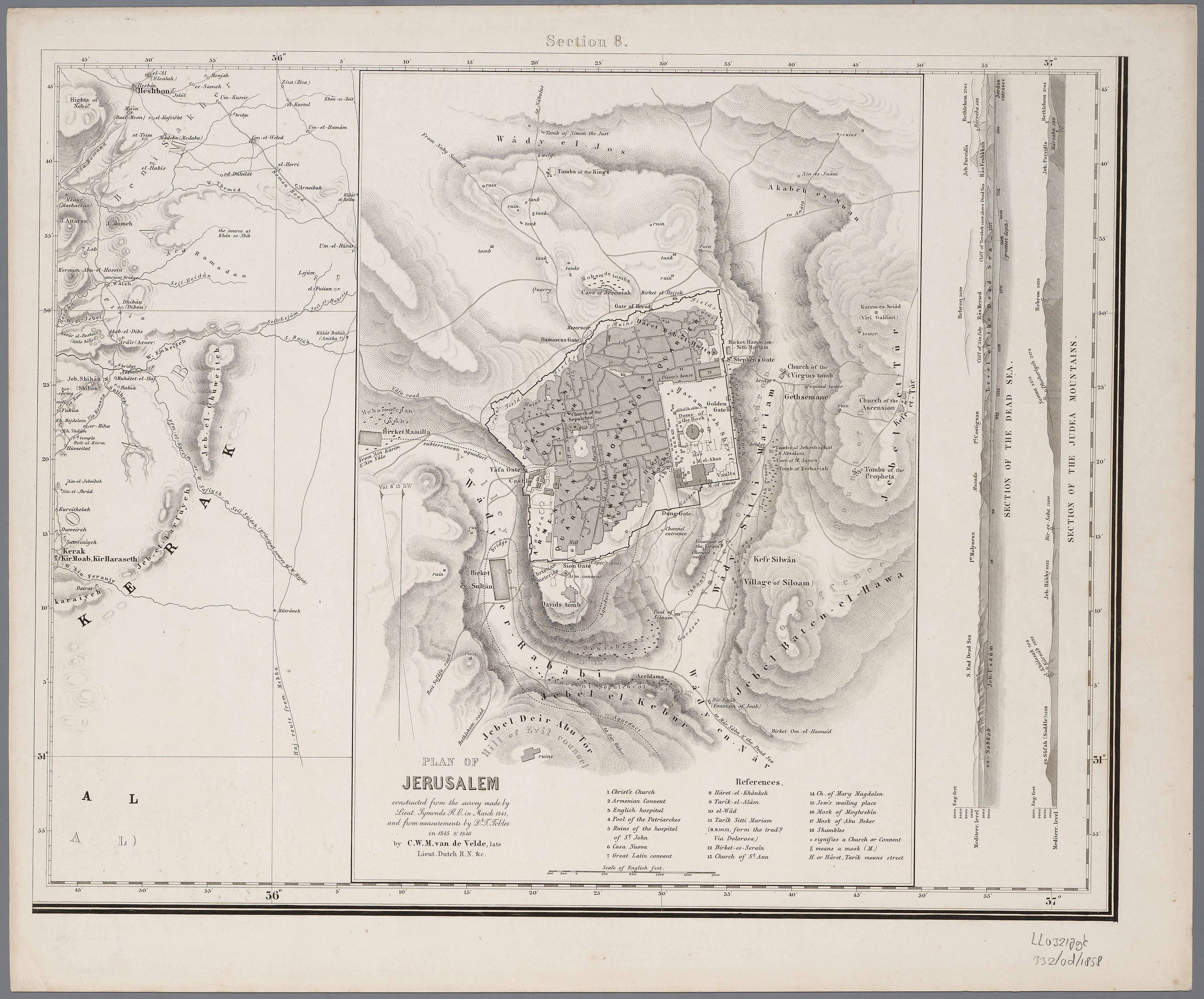
A	B
		1
		2
		3
		4
Each sheet is a separate clickable image.

== Bibliography ==
=== Primary sources ===
- Tobler, Titus (1858). Planography of Jerusalem: memoir to accompany the new ground-plan of the city of Jerusalem and the environs, constructed anew by C.W.M. Vande Velde. Justus Perthes.
- Van de Velde, Carel Willem Meredith (1858). Memoir to Accompany the Map of the Holy Land. Justus Perthes.

=== Secondary sources ===
- Moscrop, John James (1 January 2000). Measuring Jerusalem: The Palestine Exploration Fund and British Interests in the Holy Land. A&C Black. ISBN 978-0-7185-0220-1.
- Gibson, Shimon (2011). "British Archaeological Work in Jerusalem between 1865–1967: An Assessment". In Katharina Galor and Gideon Avni (ed.). Unearthing Jerusalem: 150 Years of Archaeological Research in the Holy City. Pennsylvania State University Press. ISBN 978-1-57506-223-5.
- Goren, Haim; Faehndrich, Jutta; Schelhaas, Bruno (28 February 2017). Mapping the Holy Land: The Foundation of a Scientific Cartography of Palestine. Bloomsbury Publishing. ISBN 978-0-85772-785-5.
- Levy-Rubin, Milka; Rubin, Rehav (1996). "The Image of the Holy City: Maps and Mapping of Jerusalem". In Nitza Rosovsky (ed.). City of the Great King: Jerusalem from David to the Present. Harvard University Press. ISBN 978-0-674-36708-1.
