= Zebul (biblical figure) =

Mayor of Shechem in Abimilech's time per Judges 9:28–41

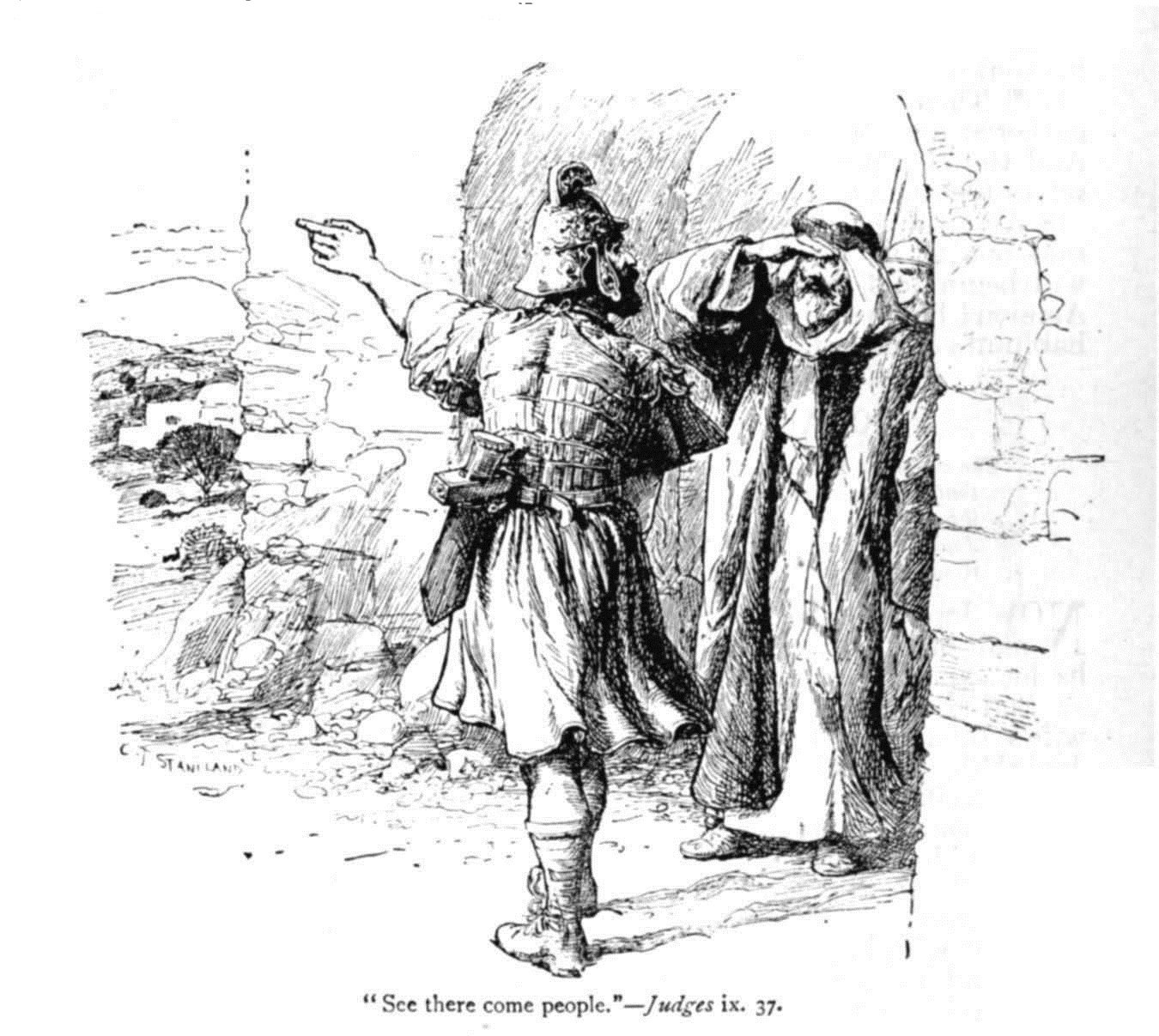
Gaal (left) points out to Zebul the approach of Abimelech's army.

Zebul (Hebrew: זְבֻל Zəḇul ) is a character in the Hebrew Bible, appearing in Judges 9. He is one of Abimelech's officers, and the governor (or "commandant") of the city of Shechem. Zebul played an important role in the rebellion and defeat of Gaal, secretly sending messengers to Abimelech and warning him of the situation.

Barry Webb describes him as a loyal friend of Abimelech, and a "shrewd military tactician".

In Handel's oratorio Jephtha, Zebul is depicted as Jephthah's brother.
