= Abimelech (Judges) =

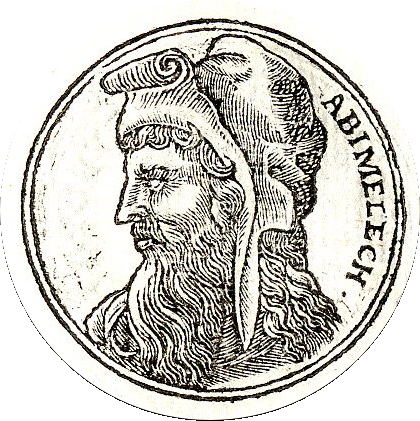
- Abimelech from Guillaume Rouillé's Promptuarii Iconum Insigniorum

King of Shechem
- Reign: 1129–1126 BC
- Predecessor: Gideon (Judge)
- Successor: Tola (Judge)
- Born: Shechem, Canaan
- Died: Thebez, Canaan
- Hebrew: אֲבִימֶלֶךְ
- Father: Gideon
- Mother: Shechemite Woman

Abimelech (/əˈbɪməˌlɛk/; אֲבִימֶלֶךְ ’Ǎḇīmeleḵ) or Abimelek was the king of Shechem and the tribal territory of Manasseh, and a son of biblical judge Gideon. His name can best be interpreted as "my father is king", claiming the inherited right to rule. He is introduced in Judges 8:31 as the son of Gideon and his Shechemite concubine, and the biblical account of his reign is described in chapter nine of the Book of Judges. According to the Bible, he was an unprincipled and ambitious ruler who often engaged in wars against his own subjects.

== Ascension to kingship ==
=== The killing of seventy brothers ===
According to the Book of Judges, Abimelech went to Shechem to meet with his uncles and grandfather of his mother's side, and claimed to them that he should be the sole ruler over them and Shechem and not his brothers. He asked them whether they'd prefer to be ruled by seventy rulers or just by the individual, and he affirmed them as equal brothers. Because of Abimelech's affirmation to them, the men inclined to follow him, and gave him seventy silver shekels from the Temple of Baal Berith. He and the men then traveled to Ophrah, Gideon's home, to kill Gideon's seventy sons, Abimelech's brothers; they were killed on the same stone, with only one escaping, Jotham.

=== Abimelech declared king ===
Since Abimelech was merely a son of Gideon's concubine, he made good of his claim to rule over Manasseh by killing his half-brothers. Jotham was the youngest brother and the only one to have escaped Abimelech's onslaught. Abimelech was later proclaimed king by the citizens of Beth-millo and Shechem. When Jotham was informed of this news, he went on top of Mount Gerizim and cursed the people of Shechem and Beth-millo for their proclamation, then fled to Beer to hide from Abimelech.

== Battles of Shechem ==
=== First Battle of Shechem ===
Gaal and his brothers arrived at Shechem only to plot a coup against Abimelech with the help of the men of Shechem. Before Gaal could begin his plot, Zebul – who was the governor of Shechem and an officer of Abimelech – heard Gaal's plan and was deeply angered. Zebul then sent messengers to inform Abimelech of Gaal's plot. Abimelech planned to ambush Gaal and his followers in front of the city gates through the night towards the morning. He divided his followers into four companies to hide and wait near Shechem. The ambush began as soon as Gaal stood in front of the gates and failed to respond because of the uncertainty of an actual ambush approaching. Zebul taunted Gaal into fighting Abimelech. Gaal soon fought Abimelech during the battle but failed and was forced to flee with his forces. Zebul chased Gaal out of Shechem while Abimelech proceeded to Arumah.

=== Second Battle of Shechem ===
The next day, the people of Shechem went out into the fields. After Gaal was driven away, Abimelech gathered three companies by dividing his followers to attack the people in the fields for turning against him and siding with Gaal. One company went to the gate and the other two attacked the people in the fields. Then, Abimelech went into the city and killed the rest and spread salt around so nothing would grow there for a long time. The remaining resistance went to the tower of El-Berith to hold their ground. Abimelech hastily gathered his followers to Mount Zalmon to explain his plan. He grabbed an ax to cut down the bough of a tree and ordered everyone to follow his example. The boughs were placed and set ablaze around the tower, killing the remaining resistance along with a thousand civilians.

== Battle of Thebez and the death of Abimelech ==
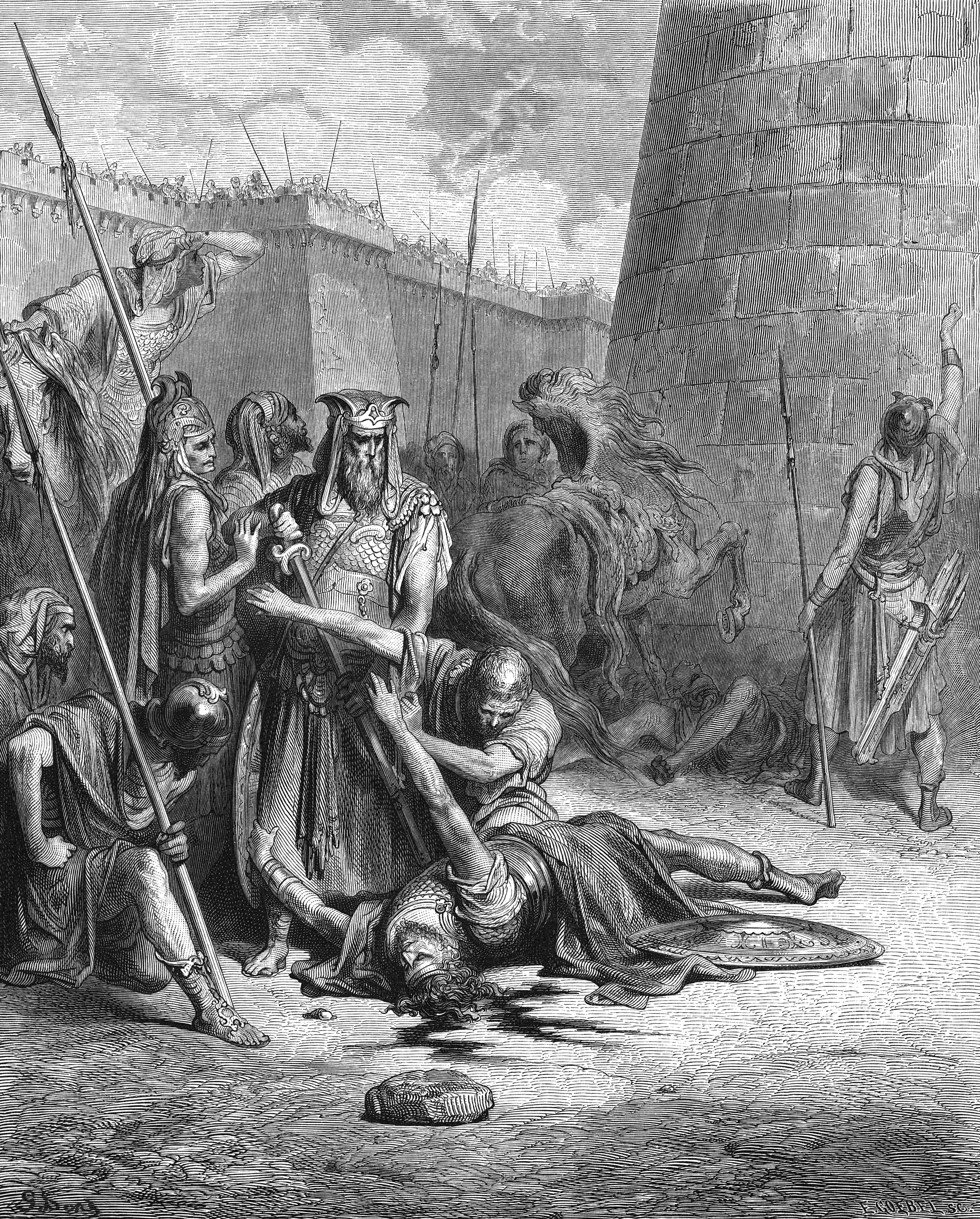
Gustave Doré, The Death of Abimelech

According to the biblical account, Abimelech and his forces then laid siege to the city of Thebez. By the time Abimelech had breached the wall, the people in the city had already fled and blockaded themselves in a heavily fortified tower. When Abimelech approached the tower to raze it, a woman hurled a runner stone down from the roof, which fell directly onto Abimelech's head. Realizing the wound was mortal, Abimelech ordered his armor-bearer to run him through with his sword, so nobody would know that he was killed by a woman.

== The Legends of the Jews ==
Louis Ginzberg's "The Legends of the Jews" records the following remarks on Abimelech: "..In the high priest's breastplate, Joseph was represented among the twelve tribes by Ephraim alone, not by Manasseh, too. To wipe out this slight upon his own tribe, Gideon made an ephod bearing the name of Manasseh. He consecrated it to God, but after his death homage was paid to it as an idol. In those days the Israelites were so addicted to the worship of Beelzebub that they constantly carried small images of this god with them in their pockets, and every now and then they were in the habit of bringing the image forth and kissing it fervently. Of such idolaters were the vain and light fellows who helped Abimelech, the son of Gideon by his concubine from Shechem, to assassinate the other sons of his father. But God is just. As Abimelech murdered his brothers upon a stone, so Abimelech himself met his death through a millstone. It was proper, then, that Jotham, in his parable, should compare Abimelech to a thorn-bush, while he characterized his predecessors, Othniel, Deborah, and Gideon, as an olive-tree, or a fig-tree, or a vine. This Jotham, the youngest of the sons of Gideon, was more than a teller of parables. He knew then that long afterward the Samaritans would claim sanctity for Mount Gerizim, on account of the blessing pronounced from it upon the tribe. For this reason he chose Gerizim from which to hurl his curse upon Shechem and it inhabitants.""Tan B 1 103. The parable of Jotham is said to refer to the prominent judges: Othniel [=Olive tree], Deborah [=fig tree], Gideon [=vine], and Elimelech [=bramble]. Tan also states that Abimelech reigned for three years, as a reward for the modesty of his father Gideon, who in a "tripartite" sentence refused the royal crown offered him by his people; see Jud. 8.23. Abimelech, in contrast to his father [Jud.8.27], was very greedy for riches, and his end therefore came speedily; Aggadat Bereshit 26, 54., see also ibid., 52-53 where Abimelech wickedness and greed was contrasted with the piety and liberality of his namesake Abimelech, the King of Getar. The ingratitude of the Israelites who permitted Abimelech to murder the children of their benefactor Gideon was counted unto them as though they had forsaken God; ingratitude is as grave a sin as idolatry; Yelammedenu in Yalkut II, 64."

== See also ==
- Kings of Israel and Judah

== Bibliography ==
- Auld, A. Graeme (1984). Joshua, Judges, and Ruth. Westminster John Knox Press. ISBN 978-0-66424576-4.
- Berlin, Adele; Brettler, Marc Zvi (2014). The Jewish Study Bible (2nd ed.). Oxford University Press. ISBN 978-0-19939387-9.
- Hancock, Rebecca S. (2013). Esther and the Politics of Negotiation: Public and Private Spaces and the Figure of the Female Royal Counselor. Fortress Press. ISBN 978-1-45146986-8.
- Sasson, Jack M. (2014). Judges 1–12: A New Translation with Introduction and Commentary. Yale University Press. ISBN 978-0-30019033-5.
- Schneider, Tammi J. (2000). Berit Olam: Studies In Hebrew Narrative And Poetry: Judges. Liturgical Press. ISBN 978-0-81465050-9.
- Szold, Henrietta; Radin, Paul (1998). The Legends of the Jews: From Moses to Esther (Reprint ed.). JHU Press. ISBN 9780801858956.

Abimelech of Manasseh Clan of Abiezer Cadet branch of the Tribe of Manasseh
Preceded by Gideon	King of Shechem	Succeeded by Tola
