= Charles William Meredith van de Velde =

Dutch painter

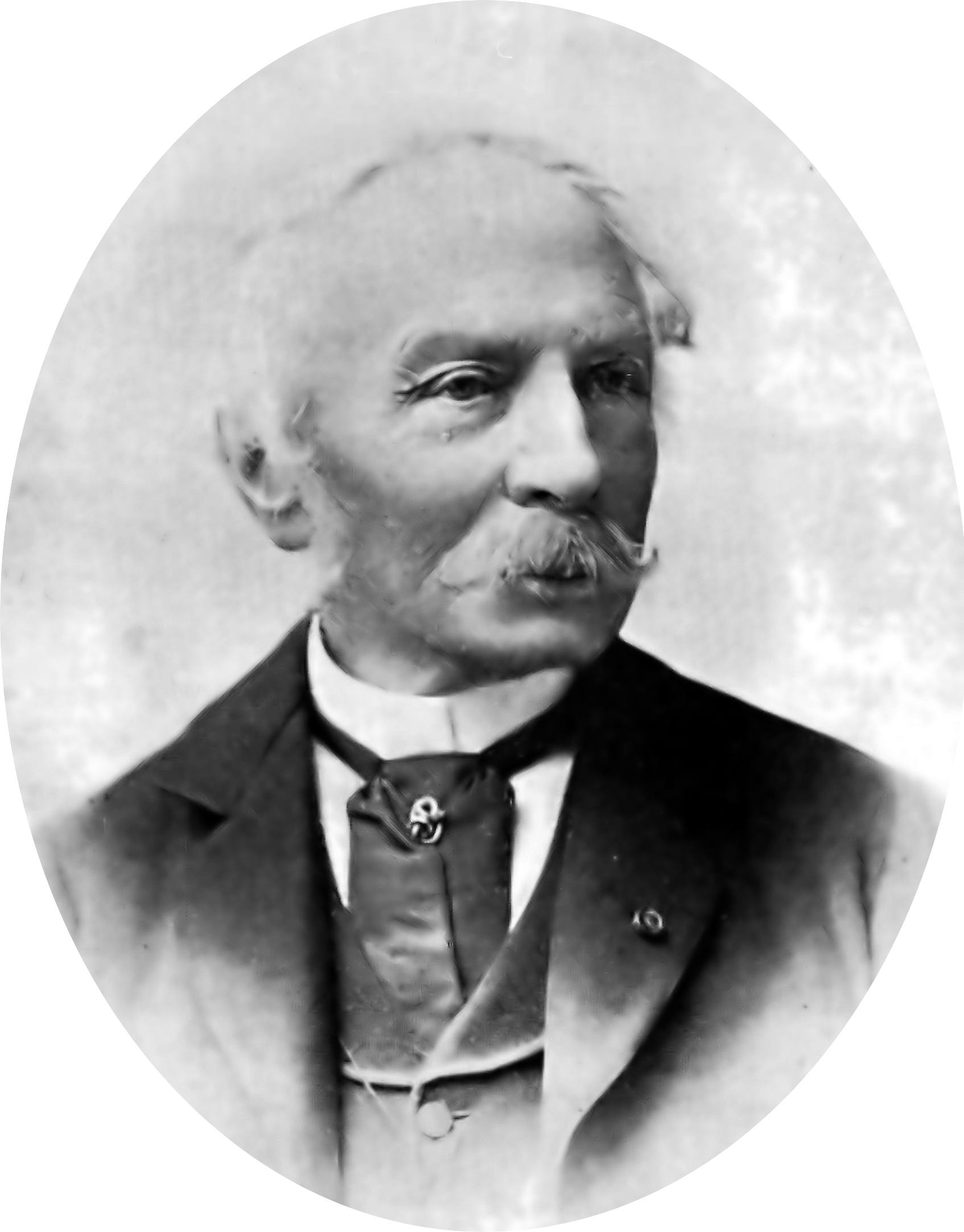
- Born: 4 December 1818
- Died: 20 March 1898 (aged 79)
- Occupations: Lieutenant-at-sea second class, painter

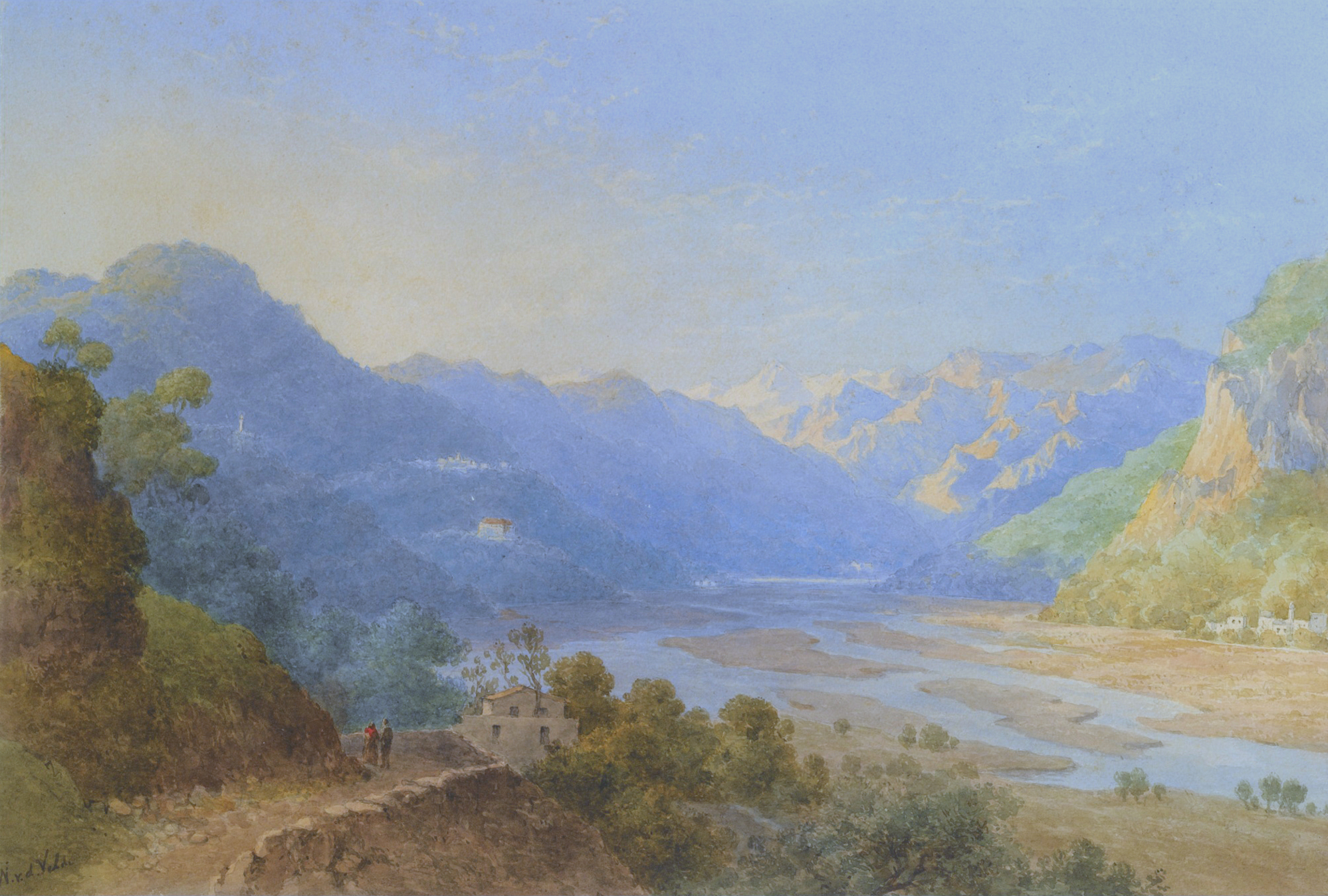
Travellers in a Mountainous Landscape with Snow Covered Peaks by van de Velde

Charles William Meredith van de Velde (4 December 1818 in Leeuwarden – 20 March 1898 in Menton) was a Dutch lieutenant-at-sea second class, painter, cartographer, honorary member of the Red Cross and missionary.

Van der Velde attended the Naval Academy in Medemblik and became Lieutenant-sea second class. From 1830 to 1841 he worked at the topographical office in modern-day Jakarta where he eventually became director. In 1844 he had to return to Europe for health reasons, where he carried out cartographic, geographic and ethnographic work and was also employed as a draftsman, and missionary nurse. In 1844, on his return to Europe, he visited Ceylon, the Transvaal and Cape of Good Hope, where he supported the work of missions and for his services provided to French ships, was awarded a Legion of Honour.

== Palestine ==
In 1851 Van de Velde visited Palestine, where he carried out various surveys, drawings, paintings and around one hundred watercolours for postcards. After his trip, he held lectures on Palestine in Geneva and Lausanne.

== Red Cross ==
On 13 March 1864, van de Velde was one of the first delegates from the newly formed International Committee of the Red Cross to act as an impartial intermediary in the Second Schleswig War. He assisted the wounded and captured Prussian and Austrian soldiers and helped establish the Red Cross as a relief organization in the 1863 conference resolutions.

On 31 July 1867, Van de Velde was made an honorary member of the main Committee of the Red Cross, which included Willem Jan Knoop and Henri Dunant.

== Bibliography ==
- Velde, van de, Charles William Meredith (1854). Narrative of a journey through Syria and Palestine in 1851 and 1852. Vol. 1. William Blackwood and son.
- Velde, van de, Charles William Meredith (1854). Narrative of a journey through Syria and Palestine in 1851 and 1852. Vol. 2. William Blackwood and son.
- Velde, van de, Charles William Meredith (1857), Paris, Vve Jules Renouard. Le Pays d'Israel. Collection de cent vues prises d'après nature dans la Syrie et la Palestine. One text volume and two plate volumes.

== Maps ==
- Map of the Holy Land / constructed by C.W.M. van de Velde ... ; engraved by Eberhardt and by Stichardt, 1858
- Map of the Holy Land / constructed by C.W.M. Van de Velde; 2nd edition, 1865
