= Idolatry in Judaism =

Idolatry in Judaism (Hebrew: עבודה זרה) is prohibited. Judaism holds that idolatry is not limited to the worship of an idol itself, but also worship involving any artistic representations of God. The prohibition is epitomized by the first two "words" of the decalogue: I am the Lord thy God, Thou shalt have no other gods before me, and Thou shalt not make unto thee any graven image or any image in the sky, on earth or in the sea. These prohibitions are re-emphasized repeatedly by the later prophets, suggesting the ongoing appeal of Canaanite religion and syncretic assimilation to the ancient Israelites.

In addition, it is forbidden to derive benefit (hana'ah) from anything dedicated to idolatry.

== Judaism's view of idolatry ==
Judaism had historically stood out from other religions in the ancient world because of its exclusive monotheism. According to Jewish theology, idolatry is the ultimate betrayal of God's relationship with humanity. It is also the ultimate metaphysical error. Idolatry was also reckoned as avodah zarah (lit. 'foreign worship'). Jewish identity in the ancient Greek and Roman civilisations was shaped by the rejection of idolatry. The strict avoidance of idolatry affected Jewish daily life in terms of cuisine, coinage, socialisations and participation in games. Jewish law's strict prohibition of idolatry meant that Jewish movements through areas containing images were inhibited. By the first century CE, Jews had responded to the idolatry of non-Jews through satire and polemics. Jewish writers used the works of their own scriptures as well as the works of Greek philosophers to denounce idolatry. While Judaism has never sought to impose the faith on non-Jews, it does require the elimination of idolatry from the world. According to Maimonides, Moses was ordered to compel all the world to accept the Noahide laws and end idolatry. The question of idolatry was a sensitive one, because idolatrous actions had brought destruction in the wilderness, according to the scriptures. Maimonides argues that the Torah's rules for ritual sacrifices are intended to help wean the Jewish People away from idolatry.

While Jews in general abhorred idolatry, some members of the Diaspora did engage in idolatrous actions. Such Jews often objectified God, visited and worshiped in pagan temples and abandoned their Jewish heritage. Some Jews differed with others on what defined an idolatrous practice. According to Artapanus and Pseudo-Aristeas some Jews were idolatrous on the cognitive level. Evidence from papyri and inscriptions also indicate that some Jews did not object to idolatry even while they clung on to their Jewish heritage.

The Mishnah and Talmud have defined idolatry. It includes worshiping an idol in the manner of its worshipers. This is called "customary worship". Another criterion is worshiping the idol with acts which are for worshiping God in the Temple. These include animal sacrifice, incense burning and sprinkling blood. Performing one of these acts means the performer is dubbed an idolater. The third criterion of idolatry is prostration. This includes bowing down with at least the head or knees on the ground. Acts such as kissing, embracing, and honoring are forbidden, but are not considered to come under idolatry. The performer of such an act does not receive capital punishment, unlike the idolater in Jewish law. Tractate Avodah Zarah of the Talmud governs Jewish interactions with idolaters. It places certain restrictions on business dealings with idolaters for the days in proximity to idolatrous festivals. It was forbidden to provide, or take, any benefit from idolatrous actions. These regulations had a strong impact on Jewish business dealings with Christians during the Middle Ages. Since Jews regarded Christians as idolaters because of Christian theological doctrines such as the Trinity, alongside the Christian usage of statues and icons, Jews would not do business dealings with Christians on Sundays. Business dealings with Muslims were not affected because Jews regarded the Muslims as pure monotheists, like themselves.

== Evolution away from idolatry in the Israelite religion ==
Judaism historically stood out from other faiths in the Iron Age world because of its strict monotheism. However, there is evidence indicating that before and probably during the early first millennium BCE, polytheism was ubiquitous in Yahwism, the religion that exalted Yahweh and would later become known as Judaism or Yahadut, after one of the tribes of Israel – יהודה, Yehudah.

To the early authors of the Tanakh, idolatry (אליל, elil) likely had different connotations than it has now, because they existed while the religion was still evolving into a monotheistic faith. For this reason, idolatry and its consequences are described differently between the various books of the Hebrew Bible, largely varying by the era in which they were written. For example, in the Book of Exodus, (which is believed to have been transcribed between the 6th and 5th centuries BCE from a more ancient oral tradition) idolatry is condemned not necessarily as a futile exercise in supplicating to nonexistent gods, but because it provokes the anger of God, who describes himself as jealous in the Ten Commandments. Within the quote typically translated as "you shall have no other gods before me", the preposition עַל is often translated as "before," but its original Hebrew/Aramaic meaning is closer to "upon," "over," or "above," which in this context may refer to rank. This suggests that its original intent may have been to establish the primacy of Yahweh among the gods and his role as the primary patron of the Israelites, rather than to declare Yahweh's status as the only authentic deity.

Genesis 35 includes a request from Jacob to his household asking them to "put away the foreign gods that are among them" in advance of a visit to Bethel, where he would build an altar to God, identified as "the God who appeared to you when you fled from your brother Esau".

Later authors characterized idolatry in very different terms: the Book of Isaiah is believed to have been composed and revised by different authors in different periods, with chapters 1–39 being composed by the historical prophet Isaiah in the 8th century BCE, chapters 40–55 attributed to "Deutero-Isaiah", an anonymous author writing during the Babylonian captivity of the 6th century BCE, and chapters 56–66 attributed to "Trito-Isaiah", writing after the return from exile. Isaiah 44:6 contains the first unambiguous statement of monotheism, "I am the first and I am the last; beside me there is no God." Isaiah 44:9–10 also contain the first clear declarations of the futility of idolatry and, accordingly, the nonexistence of the other Canaanite gods: "All who fashion idols are nothing, and the things they delight in do not profit." and "Who fashions a god or casts an idol that is profitable for nothing?" As Yahwism competed with the other cults of Canaan and became more focused on Yahweh in particular, and eventually to the exclusion of the older Canaanite gods, its conception of idolatry changed as well, paving the way for monotheism.

The people eventually known as Israelites emerged during the second millennium BCE as a distinct subculture of the Canaanite civilization, whose language was ancestral to Hebrew, and whose religion incorporated a pantheon of numerous deities. This civilization was synonymous with the later Phoenicians, who built cities in modern-day Israel and Lebanon, went on to colonize the coast of the Maghreb, and founded a thalassocratic empire ruled from Carthage. The ancient Yahwists are believed to have practiced a form of henotheism, in which Yahweh (identified with ʼĒl) was supreme, but other Canaanite deities could still be worshipped as secondary gods. Canaan had a number of deities, but Yahweh does not seem to have been among the earliest gods worshipped in Canaan. The theory for Yahweh's origin with the most scholarly recognition is that nomads from the southeast of Canaan, called Kenites or Midianites in the Tanakh, brought Yahweh to the southern reaches of Canaan, where they mingled with the Canaanite tribes that would become the Israelites. This is supported by an Egyptian inscription from the 13th century BCE with the phrase "land of Shasu of yhw," representing the earliest known use of the name YHWH, and identifying YHWH as the god of the region associated with Edom. This would help to explain the lack of reference to Yahweh in the pre-Iron Age archaeological record of mainstream Canaanite sites, which are primarily found on the coast of what is now Lebanon and northern Israel (e.g., Byblos, Baalbek). In this view, the Yahweh worship of the Israelites began as a result of cultural exchange or syncretic fusion between two distinct polytheistic cultures.

ʼĒl is believed to have been the central and ruling divinity of the ancient Canaanite pantheon, as its creator deity. It is from the name of this particular Canaanite deity (אֵל) that the general Hebrew term for God evolved – אֱלֹ, pronounced "el." Because the proper personal name YHWH (called the Tetragrammaton in its written form) was considered too holy to speak aloud, titles like Adonai or Elohim, which was originally a general term for any deity descended from ʼĒl, were used instead. Additionally, this is where many names and phrases in the Hebrew Bible come from, including Ezekiel ("God will strengthen"), Samuel ("God heard"), and Israel ("who struggles with God"). During the very early stages of Yahwism, it is believed that Yahweh and ʼĒl were considered to be separate deities, (with ʼĒl possibly being considered the father of all other Canaanite deities) and that the general meaning of Elohim was lost as it became a title associated with Yahweh in particular. The Canaanites worshipped ʼĒl as their supreme deity, while at some point the Hebrews branched off and began prioritizing Yahweh.

The Canaanites also worshipped deities mentioned in the Hebrew Bible (though often erroneously translated as general terms rather than the names of deities) and in contemporaneous apocryphal texts, such as Dagon, (whose temple Samson destroyed, according to the Book of Judges) Ba'al/Hadad, Moloch, and Asherah. Asherah was worshipped by numerous cultures in the ancient Near East, including Canaan, Ugarit, the Hittite Empire, Amurru, Akkad, and ancient Arabia; in each of these religions, her role was the queen consort of a central deity, if not the supreme deity. There is evidence that statues of Asherah were kept in early Yahwist temples, and there are some indications that the temple in Jerusalem was intended to be the sole temple to Yahweh, with other temples originally having been dedicated to other deities. The early Canaanites considered Asherah to be the wife or consort of ʼĒl, but as the ancient Israelites' religion evolved, she became the wife of Yahweh, or alternatively (according to other ancient sources) his mother. This is believed to have been a consequence of an ongoing trend of religious syncretism within Yahwism—Yahweh became conflated with ʼĒl, taking on all of his qualities, including his marriage to Asherah. Yahweh first supplanted ʼĒl as supreme deity, and later merged with him.

This trend of syncretic assimilation is theorized by Mark S. Smith to have continued for many generations, with Ba'al and Asherah eventually merging with Yahweh as well, and their qualities and stories being ascribed to Yahweh instead, such as Ba'al's identification as a storm god. He also proposes that beginning after the 9th century BCE, Yahweh (having already assimilated several ancient Canaanite deities) began to develop some idiosyncratic qualities, as a result of having been conflated with some Canaanite gods, while simultaneously being distinguished from and described in opposition to other remnants of the Canaanite faith. Some of the earliest injunctions and admonitions in the Hebrew Bible are commandments to abstain from certain ancient Canaanite practices, such as worship of Ba'al and Asherah, child sacrifice as associated with Moloch and Ba'al, worship of the sun and moon, and cults of "high places." This has been argued to mark the transition from monolatry to monotheism, since this is when the idea of idolatry began to emerge and encompass all forms of Canaanite worship except those associated with Yahweh.

The ancient Canaanite religion was still popular in the region, and coexisted with Yahwism and the early form of Judaism that evolved from it. However, the ancient Israelites eventually began to see the Canaanites as adherents of an entirely separate and idolatrous faith and compete with them. The oldest books of the Hebrew Bible reflect this competition, as in the Book of Hosea and in the Book of Nahum, whose authors lament the "apostasy" of the people of Israel and threaten them with the wrath of God if they do not give up their polytheistic cults. The transition from monolatry to monotheism and the concept of idolatry can be summarized as the following: 1) Ancient Canaanites worshipped a large variety of gods, though probably not including Yahweh; 2) Canaanites in the lands that would later be known as Israel, Samaria, and Judah began worshipping Yahweh; 3) The early Israelites prioritized Yahweh worship, treating other gods as secondary; 4) The Israelites gradually merged other deities into Yahweh, associating their traits and stories with him; 5) The deities that had previously been merged with Yahweh, and some vestigial traditions and rituals associated with their worship, were eventually seen as superstitions or elements of distinct, separate religions; 6) The authors of the most ancient books of the Hebrew Bible argued that Yahweh is the only god that Israelites should worship, and that all other worship angers Yahweh, but did not overtly deny the existence of the other Canaanite deities; 7) It's possible that at some point after the Babylonian captivity, the history and memory of Canaanite gods being worshipped alongside Yahweh in mainstream Yahwistic temples were forgotten; 8) Later Tanakh authors (beginning with the Deutero-Isaiah authors) used the term avodh zereh (עֲבוֹדה זֶרֶה) meaning foreign worship and argued that "fashioning a god or idol" was foolish and futile, as Yahweh is the only god that truly exists. The other forms of worship described in the more ancient books were deemed merely ancient superstitions or misguided foreign religions. Idolaters were no longer making Yahweh jealous by making offerings to foreign gods—rather, they were making offerings to imaginary gods that had no power to reward them with any kind of benefit. This rejection of the existence of foreign gods can be seen as marking the completion of Yahwism's transition into Second Temple Judaism.
