= Kenites =

Nomadic tribe in the ancient Levant

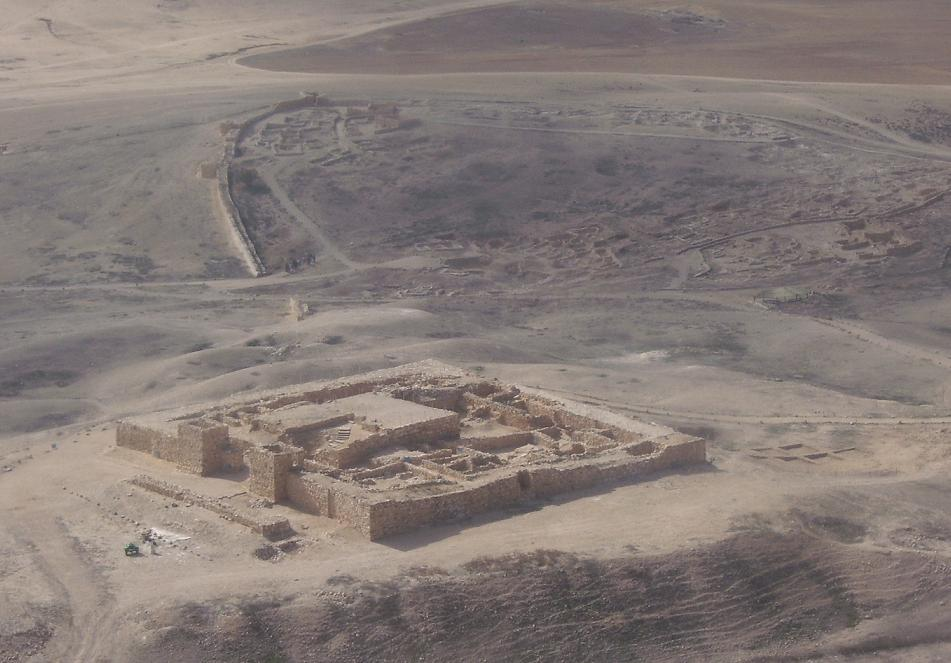
Tel Arad fortress above the town of Arad, the central hub of the Negev of the Kenites.

According to the Hebrew Bible, the Kenites/Qenites (/ˈkiːnaɪt/ or /ˈkɛnaɪt/; Hebrew: קֵינִי, romanized: Qēni) were a tribe in the ancient Levant. They settled in the towns and cities in the northeastern Negev in an area known as the "Negev of the Kenites" near Arad in modern day Israel, and played an important role in the history of ancient Israel. One of the most recognized Kenites is Jethro, Moses's father-in-law, who was a shepherd and a priest in the land of Midian (Judges 1:16). Certain groups of Kenites settled among the Israelite population, including the descendants of Moses's brother-in-law, although the Kenites descended from Rechab maintained a distinct, nomadic lifestyle for some time.

Other well-known Kenites were Heber, husband of Jael, the Biblical heroine who killed General Sisera, and Rechab, the ancestor of the Rechabites.

== Etymology ==
The word qēni (קֵינִי) was a patronymic derived from qayin (Hebrew: קַיִן). There are several competing etymologies.

According to the German Orientalist Wilhelm Gesenius, the name is derived from the name Cain, the same name as Cain, the son of Adam and Eve. However this may simply be the ancient Hebrew transliteration or phonetization of the Kenites' name in their own language.

Other scholars have linked the name to the term "smith". According to Archibald Henry Sayce, the name Kenite is identical to an Aramaic word meaning a smith, which in its turn is a cognate of Hebrew qayin "lance".

== Historical identity ==
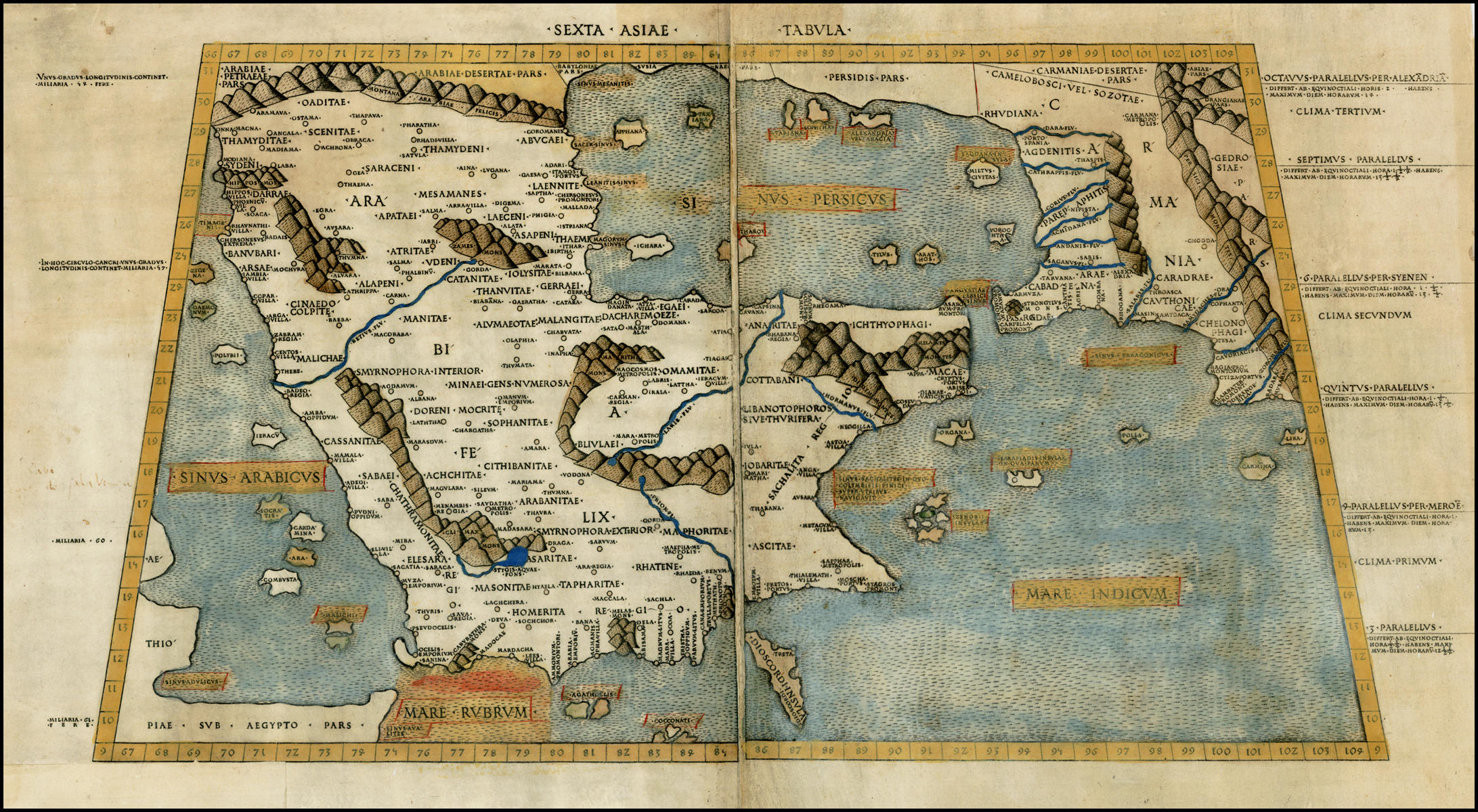
Map of Arabia based on Jacopo d'Angelo's translation of Ptolemy (1478). The tribe listed as "Cinaedocolpitae" (the Kinaidokolpitai) is located in the northwest of the map.

The Kenites are a clan mentioned in the Bible as having settled on the southern border of the Kingdom of Judah. In 1 Samuel 30:29, in the time of David, the Kenites settled among the tribe of Judah.

In Jeremiah 35:7-8 the Rechabites are described as tent-dwellers with an absolute prohibition against practicing agriculture; however, other Kenites are described elsewhere as city-dwellers (1 Samuel 30:29, 1 Chronicles 2:55).

Hippolytus of Rome in his Chronicon of 234 appears to identify the Kinaidokolpitai of central Arabia with the biblical Kenites.

In modern sources the Kenites are often depicted as technologically advanced nomadic blacksmiths who spread their culture and religion to Canaan. The suggestion that the Kenites were wandering smiths was first made by B. D. Stade in Beiträge zur Pentateuchkritik: Das Kainszeichen in 1894 and has since become widespread. This view of the Kenites originated in Germany in the mid-1800s, and it is not reflected in any ancient Hebrew, Greek, Latin, or Arabic sources.

In 1988, Meindert Dijkstra argued that an ancient inscription in a metal mine in the Sinai Peninsula contained a reference to "a chief of the Kenites" (rb bn qn).

== In the Bible ==
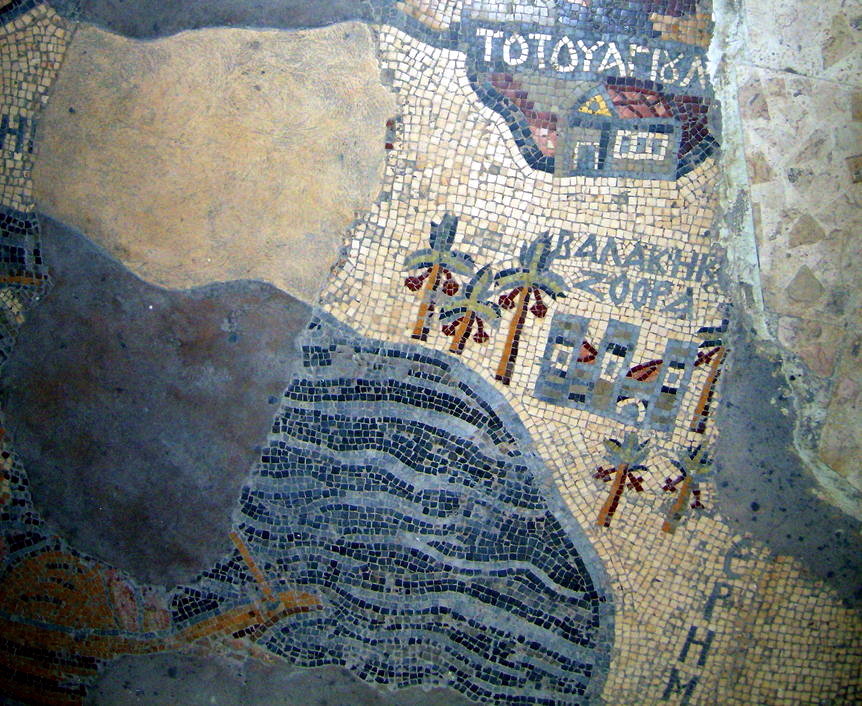
Zoar on the Madaba map

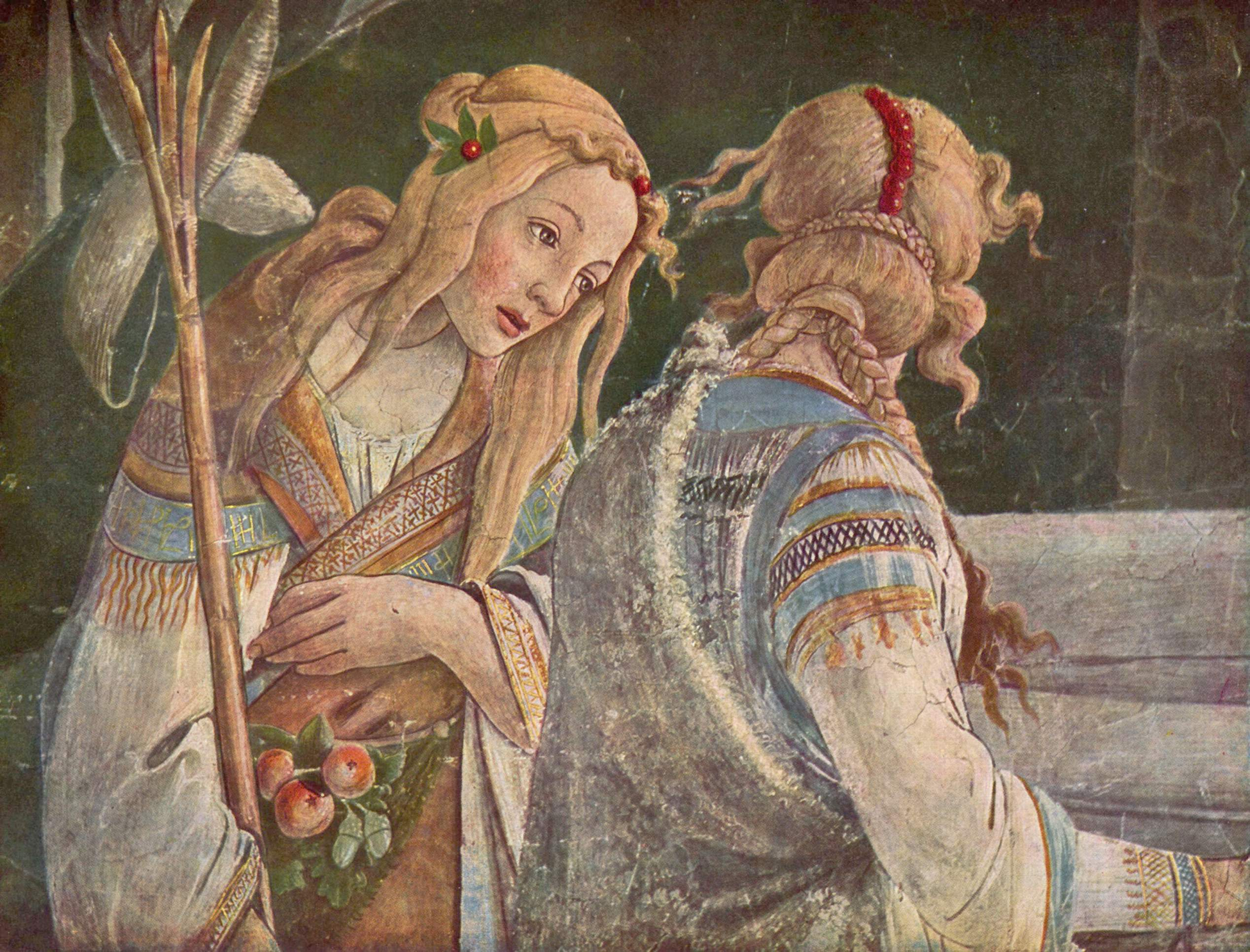
Zipporah and her sister, from a painting by Sandro Botticelli

=== Age of the Patriarchs ===
Genesis 15:18-21 mentions the Kenites as living in or around Canaan as early as the time of Abraham.

=== During the Exodus ===
According to some traditions, Moses's father-in-law, Hobab, was a Kenite (Judges 1:16), although according to Exodus his father-in-law was instead a priest of Midian named Reuel (2:16-18) or Jethro (3:1). At the Exodus, Jethro and his clan inhabited the vicinity of Mount Sinai and Mount Horeb. (Exodus 3:1)

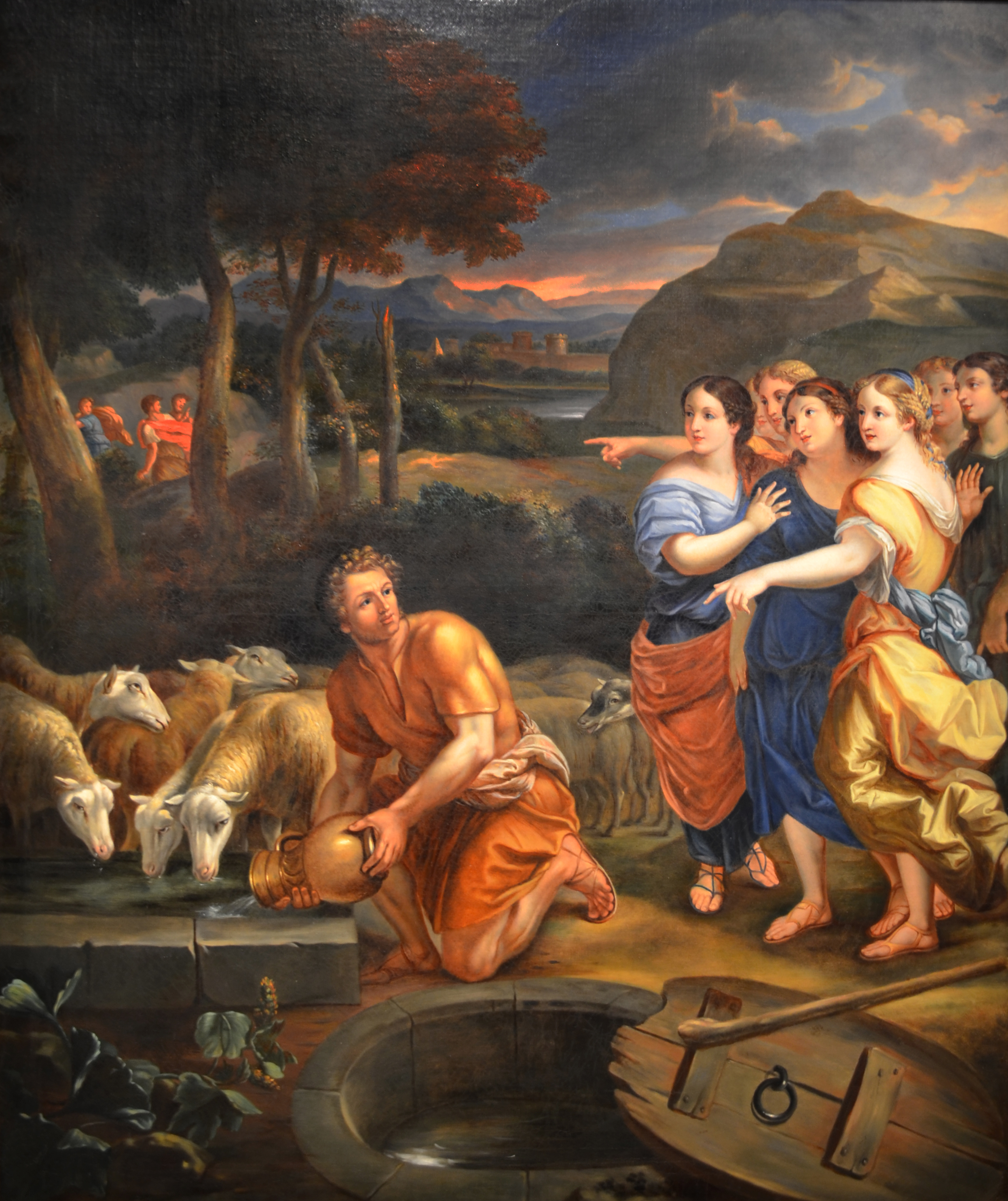
The Daughters of Jethro, Théophile Hamel, c. 1850

In Exodus 3:1 Jethro is said to have been a "priest in the land of Midian" and in Numbers 10:29, Hobab is the son of Reuel, although the text is not clear which is Moses's father-in-law. In Judges 3:1, Hobab the Kenite is Moses' father-in-law. The confusion of these names has led many scholars to believe that the terms "Kenite" and "Midianite" are intended (at least in parts of the Bible) to be used interchangeably, or that the Kenites formed a part of the Midianite tribal grouping.

The Kenites journeyed with the Israelites to Canaan (Judges 1:16); and their encampment, apart from the latter's, was noticed by Balaam.

The Kenites were closely allied with Moses, and are not mentioned to have participated in the first invasion of Canaan (Numbers 14:39–45, Deuteronomy 1:41–46) that was conducted against Moses's orders.

During the second invasion of Canaan (Numbers 21:1–4), the Kenites would have seen the area around the town of Arad, the region of Canaan that the next generation of Kenites would later choose as their place to settle after the conquest.

When the Israelites and Kenites were camped at the foot of Mount Peor, King Balak of Moab allied himself with the five Kings of Midian, but seeing that they did not have the strength to defeat the Israelites, the leaders of Moab and Midian gathered together and paid a large fee to Balaam to put a curse on the Israelite camp from the high place (a type of religious shrine) on Mount Peor (Numbers 22:1–21). Balaam was unable to curse Israel, but prophesied about the Kenites, saying that they would endure, but foretold that someday they would be led away captive as slaves to Assur, (Numbers 24:21–22), with the question of how long their future slavery would last being unanswered.

=== War between Israel and Midian ===
While the camp was still encamped on the west side of Mount Peor, the local Moabites attempted to include the Israelites in their worship of their god Baal of Peor. During the commotion and bloodshed, Moses's grandnephew Phinehas killed a Midianite princess, Cozbi, the daughter of King Zur, one of the five Kings of Midian (Numbers 25:14–18). Following this, Moses sent a strikeforce of 12,000 men (1000 from each Israelite tribe, the Kenites were not included) that succeed in killing the five kings Evi (אֱוִי), Rekem (רֶקֶם), Hur (חוּר), Reba (רֶבַע), and Zur (צַוָּר) the father of Cozbi, (Numbers 31:8, Joshua 13:21) and burned each of the Midianite cities and all of their encampments, taking their livestock (Numbers 31:1–12). The Kenites were not included in the invasion of Midian, it is unclear how the Kenites reacted to the fall of the Midianite kings that they had formerly been subject to.

=== During the Conquest of Canaan ===
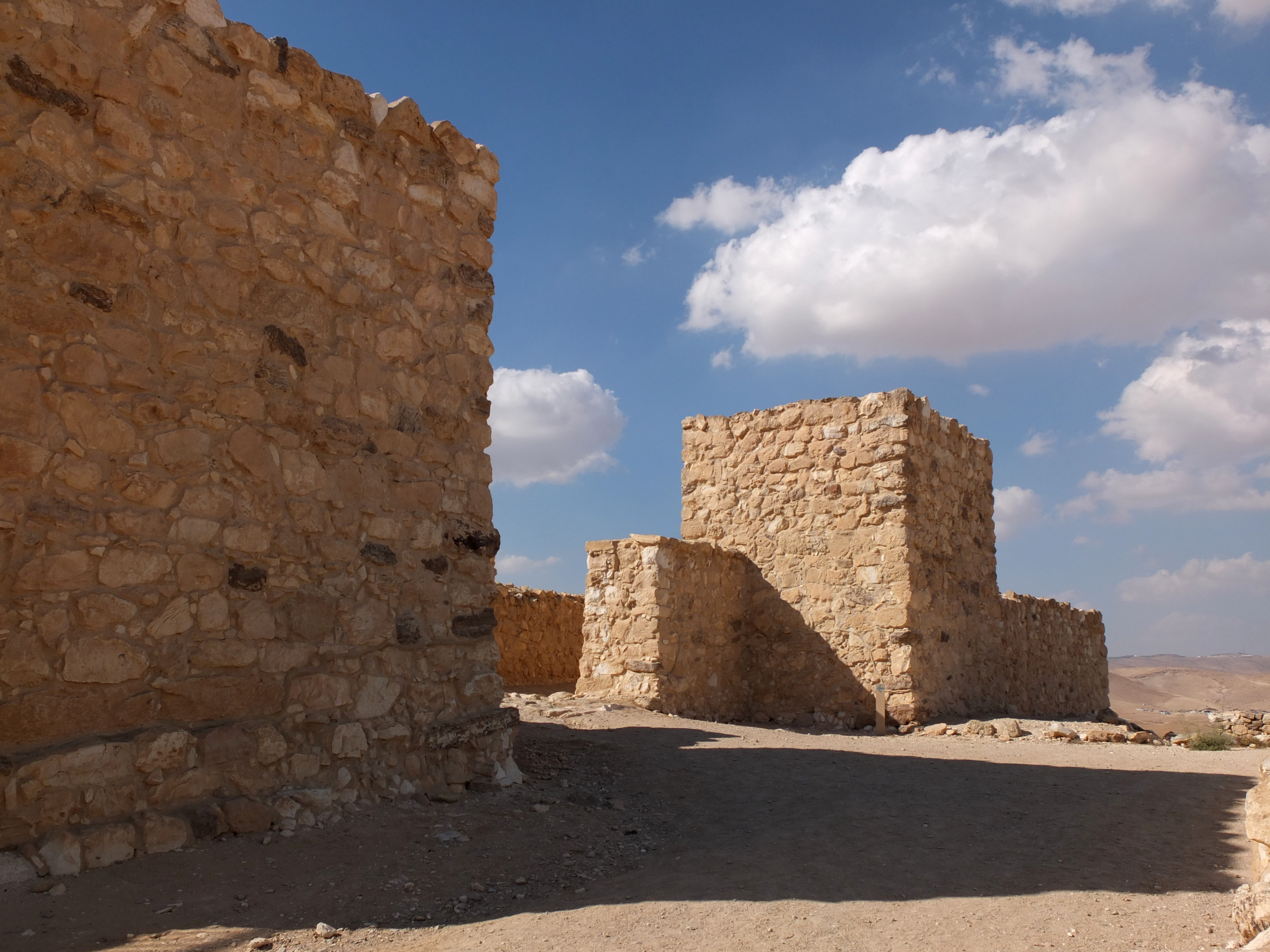
Tel Arad

After the death of Moses, Joshua led the Israelite invasion of Canaan; conquering a large portion of central Canaan. Upon Joshua's death, the Israelite tribes of Judah and Simeon took action to conquer southern Canaan, defeating the Canaanites and the Perizzites at the Battle of Bezek (now Ibziq) in Judges 1:5. After Judah's sieges of Jerusalem and Debir, Judges 1:16 says that Jethro's Kenite descendants "went up from the City of Palms, (which appears to be Zoar or Tamar in the upper Arabah), with the men of Judah to live among the people of the Desert of Judah in the Negev near Arad."

=== After settling in Canaan ===
Following the conquest, the Israelites began to assimilate into the larger Canaanite culture and started converting to the Canaanite religion (Judges 2:11–13, Judges 3:1–7), only returning to their national religion when confronted by an 8-year invasion and occupation by the North Mesopotamians (from Aram-Naharaim) under King Cushan-Rishathaim. (Non-biblical sources show the diplomatic tension between Egypt and Naharin (Mitanni) first as military rivals, under Thutmose III and Shaushtatar but after a long-negotiated marriage alliance under Thutmose IV and Artatama I they became close allies.)

After 8 years the Israelites made war against Naharaim. The Israelites rose up under the leadership of Othniel the son of Kenaz, (thus the nephew of Caleb, Judah's previous war-leader) who was a neighbor of the Kenites and lived in the same area (Judges 3:9–11). Although the text is brief, it is likely Othniel had reliable political support at-the-ready from his relatives the Calebites and Kenizzites, and probably from his Kenite neighbors as well, this likely gave him a large support base for the tribe of Judah to unite around.

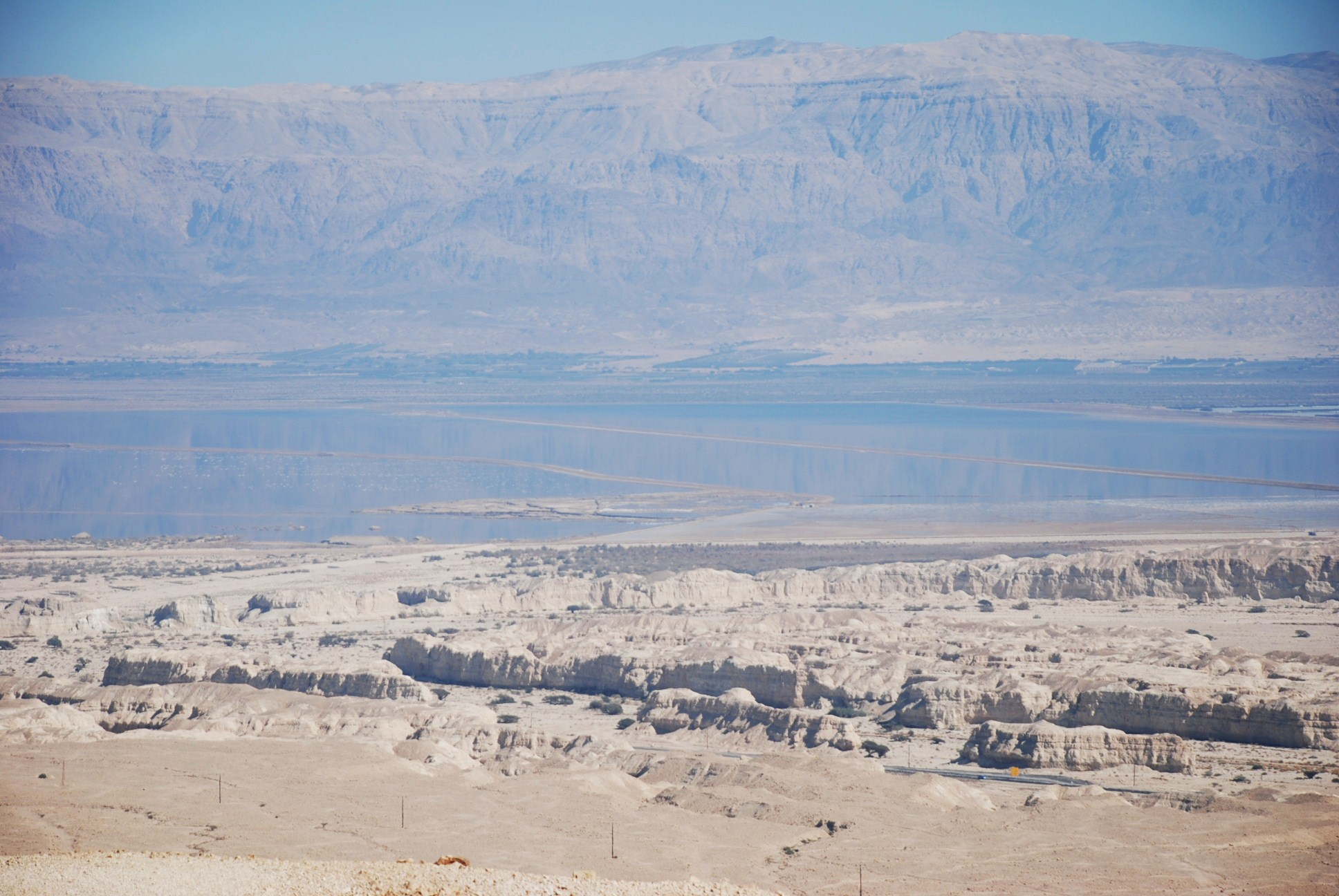
Proposed location of Zoara, As-Safi

Later, King Eglon of Moab allied with the Kingdom of Ammon and nation of Amalek, in order to invade the territory of Israel. (Judges 3:12–15) After defeating the Israelites, Moab and Amalek took the City of Palms (believed to be the later city of Zoar or Tamar), from the Kenites. [ 2 Chronicles 28:15 defines the City of Palms as Jericho.]

=== During the rise and fall of Hazor ===
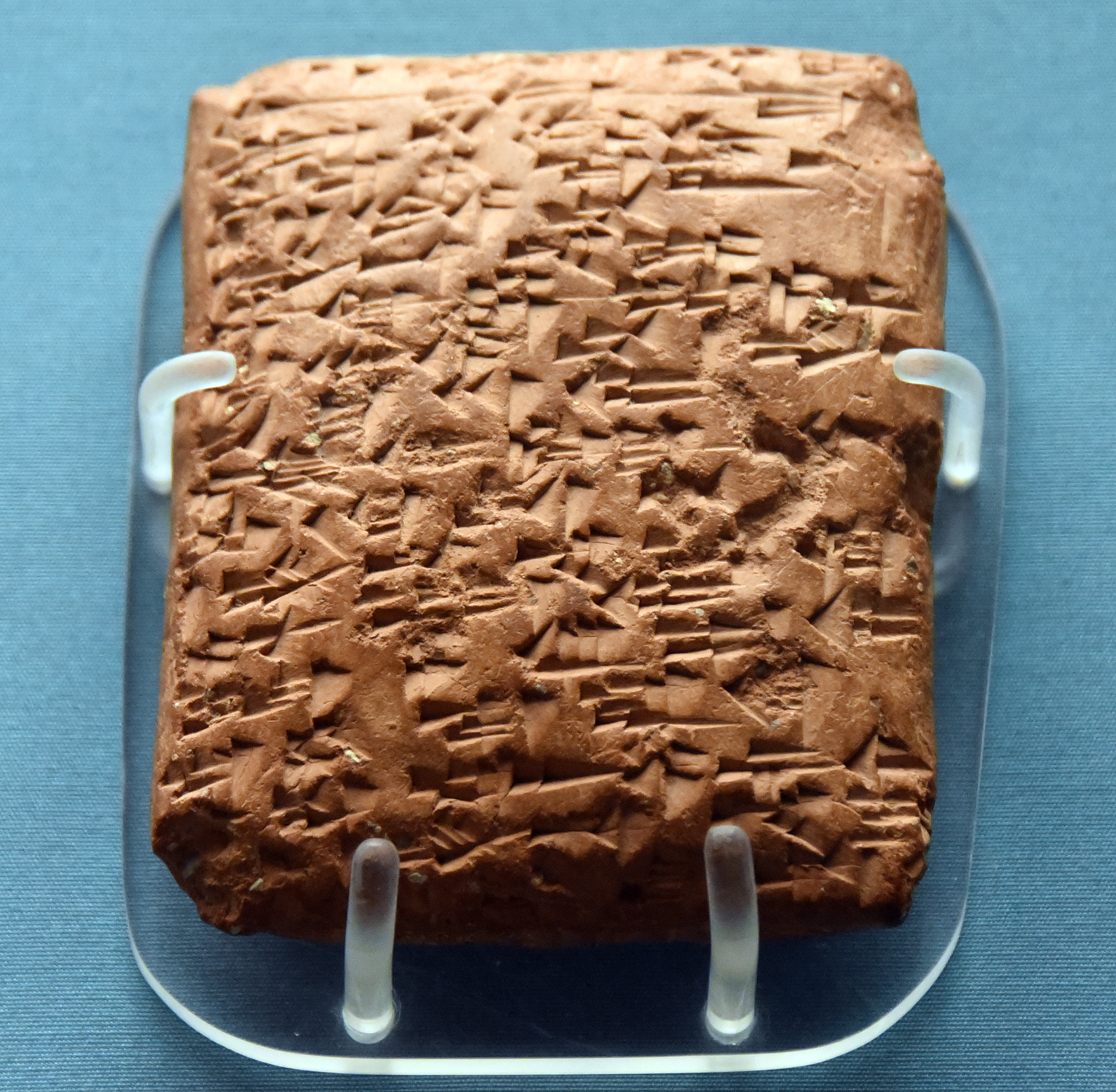
Amarna letter. A letter from Abdi-Tirshi (King of Hazor) to the Egyptian Pharaoh Amenhotep III or his son Akhenaten. Between c. 1360–1332 BC. The Amarna letters are unusual in Egyptological research, because they are written not in the language of ancient Egypt, but in cuneiform, the writing system of ancient Mesopotamia.

At this point, around 180 or 190 years after Joshua's invasion, the Canaanites in northern Canaan under King Jabin ruling from Hazor re-asserted their dominance over Canaan (Judges 4:1–3). The Israelite leader Shamgar appears to have been battling with the Philistines in south Canaan at the time, and was either caught off-guard, or unable to prevent the rising Canaanite military, economic, and political power. (Non-biblical sources depict the King of Hazor affirming loyalty to the Egyptian pharaoh, and joining the cities of Qatna and Mari to create a trade route that linked Egypt to Ekallatum)

During this period, Heber the Kenite and his wife Jael separated from their Kenite brethren in the south, and went to live in northern Canaan (Judges 4:11).

After two decades of North Canaanite dominance in the region, the prophetess Deborah, who was now leading Israel, commissioned Barak the son of Abinoam as her commander to lead the Israelites against the Canaanites. (Judges 4:4–10) King Jabin's general Sisera learned that Barak was massing troops on Mount Tabor, situated between Sisera's base at Harosheth Haggoyim (believed to now be Ahwat) and the Canaanite capital at Hazor, and set out northward to meet him with 900 chariots. The weather became unfavorable to Sisera's army, the sky became clouded (Judges 5:4–5), and the river that his chariots needed to cross was flooded. While Sisera attempted to ford his chariots through the torrential Kishon River at a river crossing close to the then-Canaanite city of Taanach (Now known as Ti'inik) near Megiddo (Judges 5:19–21), Barak's 10,000 men went down southwestward from Mount Tabor (Judges 4:14) to give battle on the plain and rivers. Sisera left his chariot behind and escaped the battle on foot, while Barak pursued the chariots that were fleeing back to the Canaanite base at Harosheth Haggoyim (Judges 4:15–16)

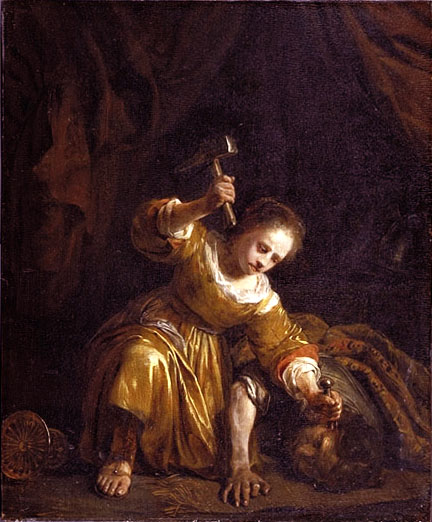
By Jan de Bray, 1659

As Sisera fled on foot near Kedesh-Naphtali, he was passing by the tent of Heber the Kenite, and Jael offered to shelter him. Accepting her offer, he asked her to stand in the doorway of the tent, and to deny his presence to anyone who was chasing him. However, once he was asleep, Jael hammered a tent peg into Sisera's head, and he died. (Judges 4:17–22, Judges 5:24–30)

From that point onwards, Israel grew stronger and continued to press Hazor harder, until King Jabin's defeat. (Judges 4:23–24)

=== In the early Israelite Monarchy ===
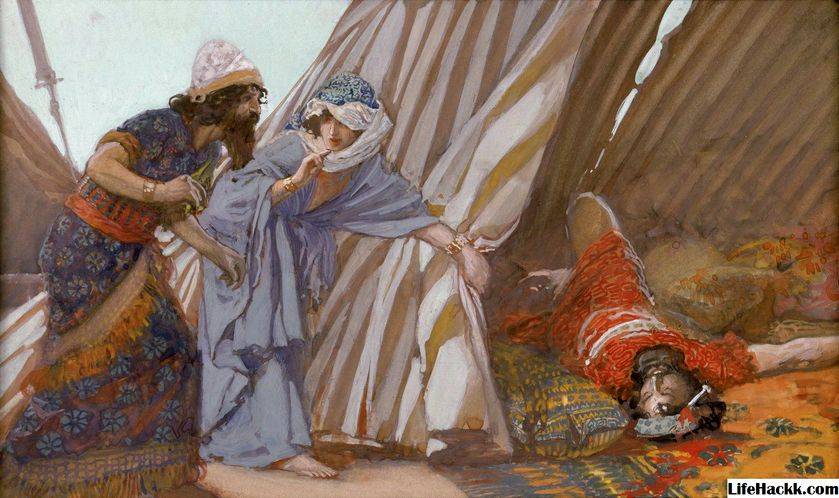
Jael shows Sisera lying dead to Barak, James Tissot, 1896–1902

In the time of King Saul there were Kenites living in Amalek territory. When King Saul of Israel went to war against Amalek, the kindness which the Kenites had shown to Israel in the wilderness was gratefully remembered. "Ye showed kindness to all the children of Israel, when they came up out of Egypt," said Saul to them (1 Samuel 15:6); and so not only were they spared by King Saul, but later in the war David also sent a share of the spoil that he took from the Amalekites to the civic elders of the cities of the Kenites. (1 Samuel 30:26–31)

In King Rehoboam's fifth year the Negev, including the Negev of the Kenites, was briefly occupied by the Egyptians during Pharaoh Shishak's (Shoshenq I) campaign into southern Palestine mentioned in 1 Kings 14:25–26 and 2 Chronicles 12:2–12. The fortifications of Arad and "Great" Arad are listed on Row VIII of the Bubastite Portal as falling to Shoshenq after Shaaraim and before Yeruham.

While the Kenite territory in the Negev had earlier been seen as a separate territory from the parts of the Negev held by Judah and the Simeonites, as the Israelites grew in power, the Negev would be mentioned in the later histories as a single region and integral part of the Kingdom of Judah.

In the northern Negev, the city of Arad served as a key administrative and military stronghold for the Kingdom of Judah. It protected the route from the Judaean Mountains to the Arabah and on to Moab and Edom. It underwent numerous renovations and extensions.

== Archeology ==
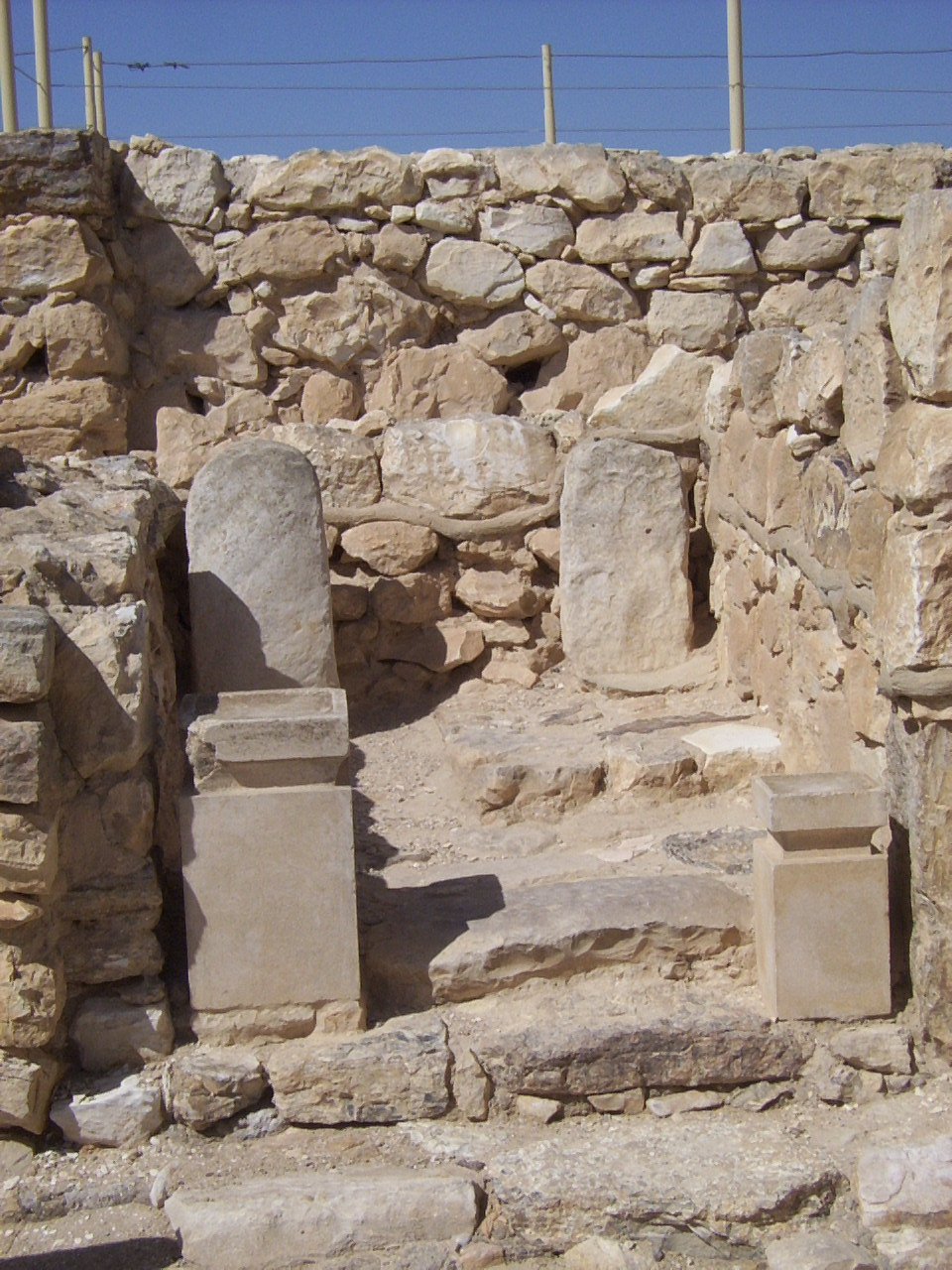
Holy of Holies of a temple at Arad, with two incense pillars and two stele, the larger one dedicated to Jehovah, and smaller one most likely to the goddess Asherah.

The Kenites have been proposed as a reason for the appearance of Midianite pottery imported into the Negev of the Kenites during the 1200s and 1100s BC. Petrographic studies carried out on some of the Timna wares led to the conclusion that they originated in the Hejaz, most probably in the site of Qurayya in Saudi Arabia.

J. Gunneweg analyzed pottery samples with the help of The Hebrew University and the University of Bonn in 1991. The Midianite pottery found in the Negev was linked to a kiln discovered at Qurayya, Saudi Arabia, through Neutron activation analysis.

Excavations at the site of Horvat Uza, and in an ostraca from Arad, seem to indicate the presence of Kenite groups in the Negev in monarchic Judah. Israeli historian Nadav Na'aman argues that the absence of anthropomorphic and other figurines at the site points to the Kenite settlers practicing aniconism.

The upper and lower areas of Tel Arad were excavated during 18 seasons by Ruth Amiran and Yohanan Aharoni between 1962 and 1984. An additional 8 seasons were done on the Iron Age water system.

The Tel Arad temple was uncovered by archaeologist Yohanan Aharoni during the first excavation season in 1962. The temple complex was destroyed by an earthquake around 800 BC. At the time of its destruction, the worship of Jehovah was joined by smaller altar. When the two altars were submitted for organic residue analysis, several cannabis derivates were detected on the smaller altar: THC, CBD, and CBN; when combined with discoveries at other sites, the use of woven hemp fabric has been linked to the worship of the goddess Asherah. In 2019, Margreet L. Steiner noted the architectural similarities between the temple at Arad and the temple found at Khirbat Ataruz.

== Critical scholarship ==
=== Kenite Hypothesis ===
According to the Kenite hypothesis proposed by the German writer Friedrich Wilhelm Ghillany, Yahweh was historically a Midian deity, and the association of Moses's father-in-law with Midian reflects the historical adoption of the Midianite cult by the Hebrews. Moses apparently identified Jethro's concept of a god, Yahweh, with the Israelites' god El Shaddai. The Kenite hypothesis supposes that the Hebrews adopted the cult of Yahweh from the Midianites via the Kenites. This view, first proposed by Friedrich Wilhelm Ghillany in 1862, afterward independently by the Dutch scholar of religion Cornelis Tiele in 1872, and more fully by the German critical scholar Bernhard Stade, has been more completely worked out by the German theologian Karl Budde; it is accepted by the German Semitic scholar Hermann Guthe, Gerrit Wildeboer, H. P. Smith, and George Aaron Barton. Another theory is that a confederation of regional tribes were connected to monotheistic ritual at Sinai.

=== Links to the mythology of Cain ===
Some biblical scholars postulated that the Kenites were descendants of the mythical Cain. The German orientalist Wilhelm Gesenius asserted that the name is derived from the name Cain (קַיִן Qayin).

The German orientalist Walter Beltz alternatively proposed that the story of Cain and Abel was not originally about the murder of a brother, but a myth about the murder of a god's child. In his reading of Genesis 4:1, Eve conceived Cain by Adam, and her second son Abel by another man, this being Yahweh. Eve is thus compared to the Sacred Queen of antiquity, the Mother goddess. Consequently, Yahweh pays heed to Abel's offerings, but not to Cain's. After Cain kills Abel, Yahweh condemns Cain, the murderer of his son, to the cruelest punishment imaginable among humans: banishment.

Beltz believed this to be the foundational myth of the Kenites, a clan settled on the southern border of Judah that eventually resettled among the tribes of Judah. It seemed clear to him that the purpose of this myth was to explain the difference between the nomadic and sedentary populations of Judah, with those living from their livestock (pastoralists, not raising crops) under the special protection of Yahweh.

Ronald Hendel believes the Israelites linked the Kenites to Cain to give them a "shameful, violent ancestral origin".

=== Kenites as metalworkers ===
According to the critical interpretation of the Biblical data, the Kenites were a clan settled on the southern border of Judah, originally characterized by a semi-nomadic lifestyle and involved in the copper industry in the Aravah region.

In the 1899 Hastings' Dictionary of the Bible, Archibald Sayce suggested that the Kenites were a tribe of smiths. Based on the biblical references, proposed etymological linkage of the name 'Kenite' to blacksmithing and other evidence, various scholars have associated the Kenites with coppersmithery and metalwork.

== See also ==
- The Kinaidokolpitai, identified as being the Kenites in the 100s and 200s AD.
- The Midianites, Possible super-group to the Kenites
- The Kenizzites, an ally of the Kenites in southern Canaan.
- The Calebites, a clan with mixed Judah and Kenizzite heritage, on friendly terms with the Kenites.
- The Ghassanids, the tribe to the south of the Kenites and the later Kinaidokolpitaites.
- Judah, a large Israelite tribe allied with the Kenites in southern Canaan, later the Kingdom of Judah.
- The Simeonites, an Israelite tribe allied with Judah, the Kenites lived in tents to their south and to their east.
