= Gérard Nissim Amzallag =

French biologist

- Born: 1962
- Occupation: Biologist

Gérard Nissim Amzallag (Hebrew: ז'ראר ניסים אמזלג) is a French-Israeli biologist, born in Morocco in 1962. He is an associate researcher at Ben Gurion University. He holds a doctorate in biblical studies. His work on the origins of Yahwism was controversially received, describing Yahweh's proposed origin as the Canaanite god of metallurgy. He has written on the origins of biblical archeology locations such as Edom, and analyses of the Psalms. His work on Yahweh and the Origins of Judaism has been cited by Daniel E. Fleming and Yigal Levin.

It was also cited by detractors in 2010, "A Chalcolithic Error." Thornton et al named the academic as author of methodological and referential shortcomings, and "errata" too numerous to exhaust. The discussion (sive conclusion) rounds up:

Crucible and furnace smelting methods are not... as different as the author suggests, and we have provided... evidence for the indigenous development of furnace technology from earlier crucible smelting technologies. Contrary to Amzallag's vision of advanced furnace smelting originating in the southern Levant, we have demonstrated (it was a) conservative area as far as smelting is concerned.

This criticism didn't stop his output, however. In 2023, he published Yahweh and the Origins of Ancient Israel, moving forward based on previous musings on the metallurgical aspects of Yahweh. The author's multidisciplinary view is of a mainly volcanic and smithing Kenite hypothesis of Yahweh.

== Publications ==
- La raison malmenée, CNRS Éditions, Paris, 2002
- L'Homme végétal, Albin Michel, Paris, 2003
- Amzallag, Gérard Nissim (2010). La réforme du vrai: enquête sur les sources de la modernité. Paris: C. L. Mayer. ISBN 978-2-84377-156-9.
- Amzallag, Nissim (2009). "Yahweh, the Canaanite God of Metallurgy?". Journal for the Study of the Old Testament. 33 (4): 387–404. doi:10.1177/0309089209105686. ISSN 0309-0892. S2CID 171053999.
- La forge de Dieu, Le Cerf, 2020, 299 pages, EAN 9782204140508
- Amzallag, Gérard Nissim (2023). Yahweh and the origins of ancient Israel: insights from the archaeological record. New York: Cambridge University press. ISBN 978-1-009-31477-0.
- Amzalag, Nisim (2021). Psalm 29: a Canaanite hymn to YHWH in the Psalter. Études bibliques. Leuven Paris Bristol, CT: Peeters. ISBN 978-90-429-4592-0.

== External ==
- Essays https://www.thetorah.com/author/nissim-amzallag
