= Kenite hypothesis =

Biblical source criticism theory

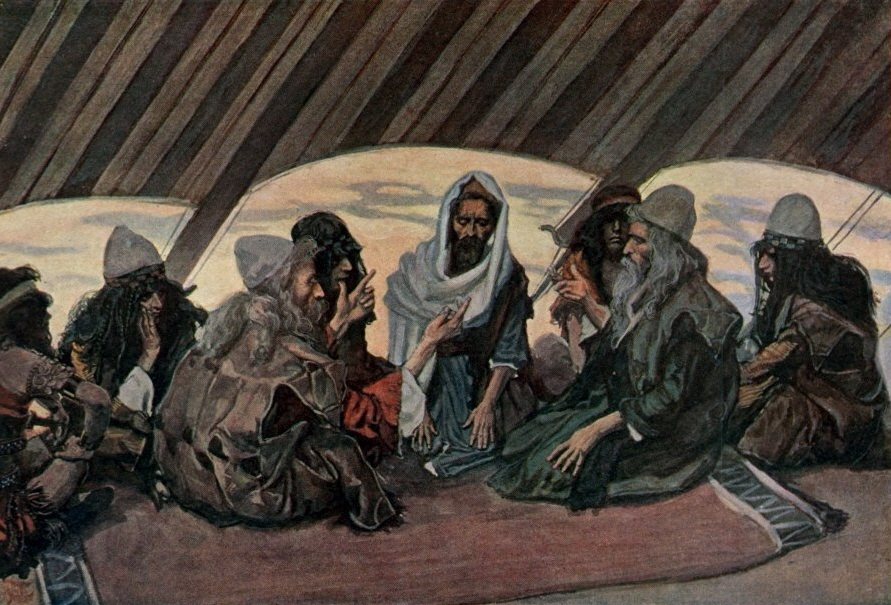
James Tissot's c. 1900 watercolor painting Jethro and Moses. Jethro was the most well known Midianite.

The Kenite hypothesis, or Midianite–Kenite hypothesis, is a hypothesis about the origins of the cult of Yahweh. As a form of Biblical source criticism, it posits that Yahweh was originally a Kenite (i.e., Midianite) god whose cult made its way northward to the proto-Israelites.

The hypothesis first came into prominence in the late nineteenth century. It is based on four key points: an interpretation of the biblical texts dealing with the Midianite connections of Moses; allusions in ancient poetic compositions to the original residence of Yahweh; ancient Egyptian topographical texts of the fourteenth to the twelfth centuries BCE; and the presupposition of Cain (or Cainan) as the eponymous progenitor of the Kenite tribe of Midian. The hypothesis thus interrogates the ethnic origins of Judah and posits that the geographic origins of Yahweh, and by extension Yahwism, do not lie in the Biblical Canaan as conventionally understood but rather lie farther south, in the region the Tanakh calls "Midian" on the eastern shore of the Gulf of Aqaba on the Red Sea. This land was inhabited by a peoples including the Kenites.

== History ==
Friedrich Wilhelm Ghillany in 1862 was the first to propose that Yahweh had originally made his home in what was historically known as the kingdom of Edom (the area immediately south of the Dead Sea), citing numerous passages where the deity is described as coming from southern lands. A decade later, a similar theory was independently espoused by Cornelis Petrus Tiele, and more fully by Bernhard Stade (1887). The hypothesis in the form it currently takes was more completely worked out by Karl Budde; and later was accepted by H. Guthe, Gerrit Wildeboer, Henry Preserved Smith, and George Aaron Barton.

The theory was widely accepted at first, particularly among German and Anglophone scholars. Eduard Meyer, Bernhard Stade, Karl Budde, Hugo Gressmann, George Aaron Barton, Thomas Kelly Cheyne, and Henry Preserved Smith each endorsed it. By the 20th century the theory had become controversial. Detractors included Theophile James Meek, Frederick Winnett, Martin Buber and Roland de Vaux, besides Gorden (1907), Konig (1912), Kittel (1917), Volz (1947), and Procksch (1950).

Biblical scholar Joseph Blenkinsopp concluded in 2008 that "[the Kenite] hypothesis provides the best explanation currently available of the relevant literary and archaeological data". By contrast, Juan Manuel Tebes, in a 2021 publication focusing on archaeological evidence from the Southern Levant and Northern Arabia, presents the "Midianite" influence on Canaan as a drawn-out process of cultural transmission taking place during the 10th to 6th centuries BCE.

== Basic model ==
The Kenite hypothesis rests on four bases: an interpretation of the Book of Exodus dealing with the Midianite connections of Moses; allusions in ancient poetic compositions to the original residence of Yahweh; Ancient Egyptian topographical texts from the 14th - 12th centuries BCE; and the tradition that recognized Cain as the eponymous ancestor of the Kenites.

Moses's meeting Jethro and the events following comprise the first textual support of the Kenite theory. Moses, son of Levitical parents, sojourns in the land of Midian and marries the daughter of Jethro. The narrative states that Jethro is a priest—possibly the priest—of Midian. At the "mountain of God"—a place sacred to the Midianites which may be Mount Horeb—Moses received a revelation from a deity previously known to him only notionally, if at all. Given the pre-existing sacrality of the mountain, this was presumably a deity worshipped by Midianites. The deity revealed its name to Moses as "Yahweh". Later in the Exodus narrative Moses, returns to the sacred mountain in Midian, this time with the Israelites. Jethro tells Moses that he has heard about Yahweh's murderous feats in Egypt. Jethro blesses Yahweh, proclaiming him like no other.

The passage can be interpreted in two ways. Either Jethro acknowledges Yahweh as superior to his own unidentified gods, or Jethro reaffirms the Midianite devotion to Yahweh and celebrates Yahweh's might. The general interpretation is the former, that Jethro, a non-Jew, recognized the true god in Yahweh, the god of Israel, and paid him homage. Proponents of the Kenite hypothesis see the passage in light of the latter interpretation, that Jethro rejoices that the god he and his people already worshipped, i.e., Yahweh, has proved himself mightier than Egypt’s gods. Thus, according to the Kenite hypothesis, the passage shows the incorporation of the Israelite leaders into the worship of Yahweh rather than Jethro's endorsement of Moses's Yahwism.

Early Yahwistic poetry is the next base of support for the Kenite hypothesis. On five separate occasions, Yahweh is given explicit residency in the lands south of the biblical Kingdom of Judah. These passages are Deuteronomy 33:2, Judges 5:4, Habakkuk 3:3 and 3:7, and Isaiah 63:1. Each passage describes Yahweh as having come forth from the lands of Midian and Edom, sometimes in specific places such as Bozrah, Mount Seir, and Mount Paran, and sometimes in generic terms where the deity is described as coming from Teman, a word literally meaning "south." Mount Seir, in particular, became a synonym for the Edomites both inside and outside the Hebrew Bible. The Amarna letters mention a "people of Shēri", and a 13th-century BCE topographical list made by Rameses II in West Amara mentions the "Shasu of Seir" and "Shasu of Yhw [Yahweh]". The texts of the "Blessing of Moses" and the "Song of Deborah" seem to quote each other, depending on which was written first, and while both say Yahweh "shone forth" from Mount Paran, the "Blessing of Moses" is unique in that it specifically mentions that Yahweh actually came from Mount Sinai. Proponents of the Kenite hypothesis explain this by citing evidence of textual corruption in the passage.

The Genesis creation narrative may include an allusion to a traditional belief that the Kenites were present in the mythical early history of Israel in the story of Cain, son of Adam and Eve, and his descendants (Gen. 4:1-24). In this view, the name of the Kenite tribe is held to derive from Cain's name. The Kenites, like Cain, are said to be nomadic. The Kenites are described as metalworkers, a science which the Book of Genesis states was invented by the descendants of Cain. Yahweh had expelled Cain to the wilderness for murdering his brother Abel. Cain has a brother, Seth, and Genesis states that people of the generation of Seth's began to call Yahweh by name for the first time. Contradicting this is the burning bush episode in the Book of Exodus, when Yahweh tells Moses that his name was not known to previous generations.

Proponents of the Kenite hypothesis claim this inconsistency demonstrates a preserved implicit tradition that the cult of Yahweh—explicitly shown as having been established through Moses—had a pre-Mosaic history in Midian. Proponents find further indirect support in the positive portrayal of Kenite in Exodus and other books of the Hebrew Bible. Kenites and some groups closely associated with them appear to have been known as fervid devotees of their god Yahweh, even during times when Yahweh's own chosen people, the Israelites, had largely abandoned his worship. As such, a Kenite "Yahwistic primitivism" may be relics of the aboriginal, pre-Israelite Yahwism associated with the Kenites and related groups.

== Volcano and fire associations ==
Under this interpretation, scholars such as Gérard Nissim Amzallag have posited that Yahweh was originally portrayed as a fire deity, associated with volcanic activity and metallurgy, and has his origins possibly in Midian. There are volcano and smelting theophanies, such as the presence of YHWH being described as melting mountains and intense radiance and fire like a furnace. The description of the story on Mount Sinai, with smoke rising, quaking earth and fire reaching the heavens mimics volcano phenomenon. The hypothesis posits that Israelites inherited YHWH from their historical interactions with the Kenites, in the regions south of Judah.

== Criticism ==
Several assertions of Kenite hypothesis have been disputed by scholars.

There is little-to-no evidence of significant interaction between the southern and central Levant during the timeframe when the Israelite religion would have crystallized; in fact, the only cultural diffusion discernible during this time period came from ancient Egypt, and even then there is no evidence that the actual cultic practices of Palestine or Midian changed at all. As summarized by Tebes (2021), "[d]uring this period, there is no evidence of contacts between the local semi-pastoral societies with the Israelite (or proto-Israelite) population settling down in the central highlands of Palestine, not to mention the transmission of religious ideas." Furthermore, a Midianite–Kenite origin for the Yahweh cult has obvious implications for ethnic origins, specifically the origins of Judah, and raises the further question of how this cult came to be adopted by the early Israelite settlers in the central Palestinian highlands. The theory postulated that the Judahites were part of an Arabian trade league of numerous clans that ended up migrating north to Palestine; however in the 250 years that have passed since this explanation was offered, a number of genetic and archeological studies have concluded that the people that would become the Israelites originated in Canaan.

Other critics disagree with the attribution of the Kenites to Cain. A. H. Sayce, for instance, points out the Hebrew form of the singular "Kenite" (Hebrew: קֵינִי Qeiniy), is identical or strikingly similar to Aramaic words meaning "smith", an etymology which forgoes the implied connection of metallurgy to Cain and his descendants and instead attaches it directly and unambiguously to the craft. The definition of the term Qinim as "metalsmiths" or "people of Qayin" are equally coherent.

Others disagree with the theory's reliance on a supposed historical basis for the narratives of Moses. Most scholars, while retaining the possibility that a Moses-like figure existed in the 13th century BCE, agree that Moses, as portrayed by the Tanakh, is a legendary figure. There is also the issue of the timeframe of the narratives' composition. The general consensus, despite the collapse of the Documentary hypothesis, is that the Book of Exodus was compiled around 600 BCE and finalized by 400 BCE, 800–1000 years after Moses would have existed and the Exodus would have occurred. However, this does not preclude the idea that Moses and the Exodus were pre-existing motifs in Israelite thought — the narratives were certainly based on extensive oral tradition, the age of which cannot reasonably be determined with any veracity. But even still, this was not uniform. The northern prophets Amos and Hosea draw on the Exodus in their preachings, meanwhile of the southern prophets contemporary to them, Micah and Isaiah, only Micah mentions the Exodus, only doing so briefly. However, the southern Israelites weren't completely ignorant of the apparently ancient Exodus narrative, as they are featured at length in Psalm 78 and Psalm 114, and Moses is mentioned by name in Psalm 77, Psalm 90, Psalm 99, and Psalm 105, as well as by Jeremiah. Even still, this is a strong indication that the Exodus narrative was vastly more developed in the setting of the northern kingdom than the southern kingdom, which raises the question of how a people could have realistically allowed knowledge of such a central and holy piece of their own history to be divided by political borders. The story of the Exodus may, therefore, have originated only a few centuries earlier, perhaps in the 9th or 10th centuries BCE, and taken different forms in Israel and Judah. Combined with the strong consensus among scholars that the Exodus narrative is largely legendary, it spells problems for the largest beam of support for the Kenite hypothesis.

For these reasons, among others, many scholars outright reject the Kenite hypothesis.

== Bibliography ==
- Cross, Frank Moore (1973). Canaanite Myth and Hebrew Epic: Essays in the History of the Religion of Israel. Harvard University Press. ISBN 0-674-09176-0.
- Day, John (2002). Yahweh and the Gods and Goddesses of Canaan. Journal for the Study of the Old Testament: Supplement Series. Vol. 265. Sheffield Academic Press. ISBN 978-0-567-53783-6.
- Fleming, Daniel E. (2020). Yahweh before Israel: Glimpses of History in a Divine Name. Cambridge University Press. ISBN 978-1-108-83507-7.
- Kitz, Anne Marie (2019). "The Verb *yahway". Journal of Biblical Literature. 138 (1): 39–62. doi:10.15699/jbl.1381.2019.508716. ISSN 0021-9231.
- Lewis, Theodore J. (2020). The Origin and Character of God. Oxford University Press. ISBN 978-0-19-007254-4.
- Miller, Patrick D. (2000). The Religion of Ancient Israel. Westminster John Knox Press. ISBN 978-0-664-22145-4.
- Miller II, Robert D. (2021). Yahweh: Origin of a Desert God. Forschungen zur Religion und Literatur des Alten und Neuen Testaments. Vol. 284. Vandenhoeck & Ruprecht. ISBN 978-3-647-54086-3.
- Na'aman, Nadav (2011). "The Exodus Story: Between Historical Memory and Historiographical Composition". Journal of Ancient Near Eastern Religions. 11: 39–69. doi:10.1163/156921211X579579.
- Stone, Robert E. II (2000). "I Am Who I Am". In Freedman, David Noel; Myers, Allen C. (eds.). Eerdmans Dictionary of the Bible. Eerdmans. ISBN 9789053565032.
- Pfitzmann, Fabian (2020). Un YHWH venant du Sud?: De la réception vétérotestamentaire des traditions méridionales et du lien entre Madian, le Néguev et l'exode (Ex-Nb; Jg 5; Ps 68; Ha 3; Dt 33). Orientalische Religionen in Der Antike (in French). Vol. 39. Mohr Siebeck. ISBN 978-3-16-159122-8.
