= Yahweh =

Ancient Semitic deity in the Levant

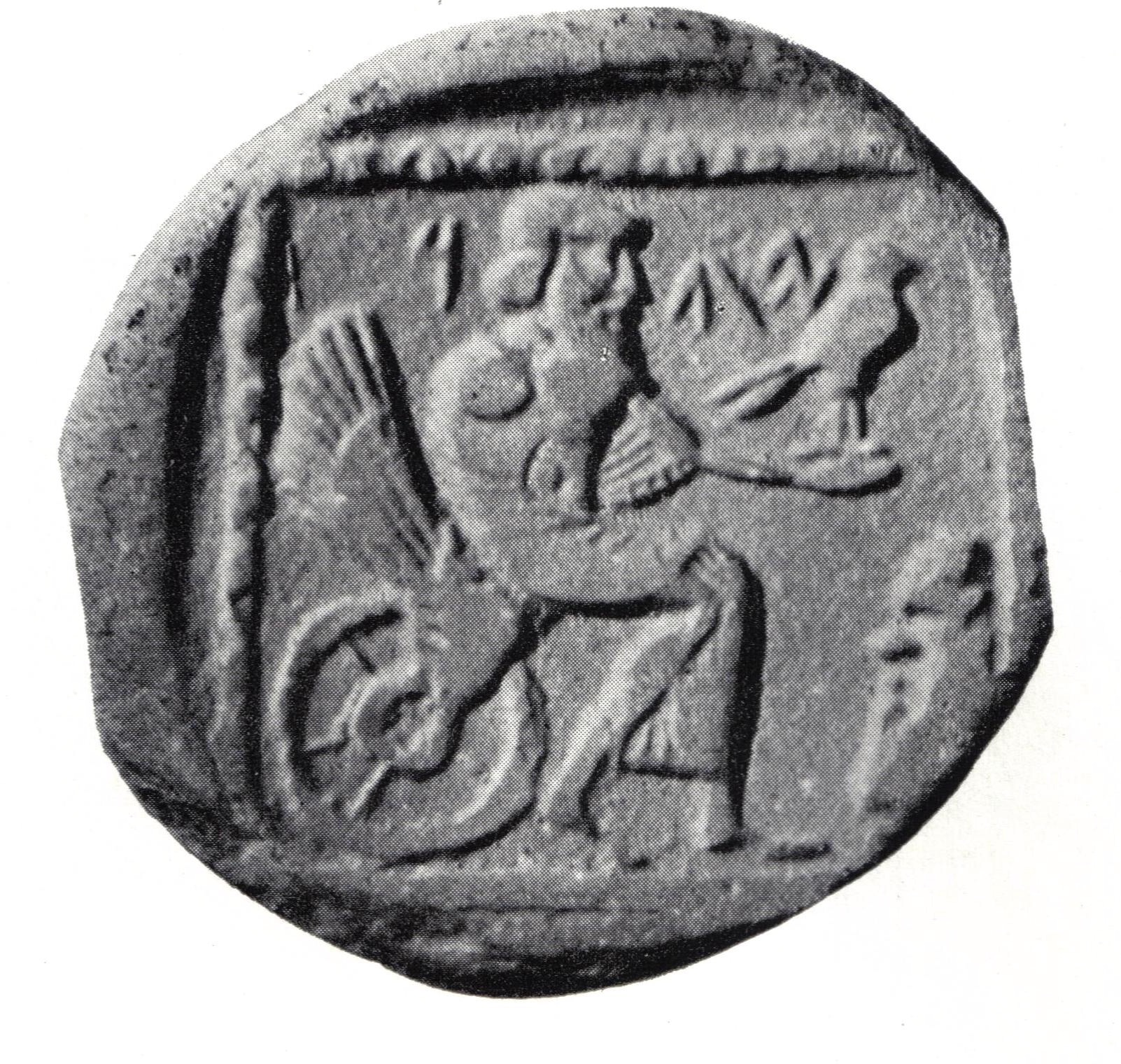
- The God on the Winged Wheel coin has been proposed as a possible depiction of Yahweh.
- Paleo-Hebrew: 𐤉𐤄𐤅𐤄
- Venerated in: Kingdom of Israel; Kingdom of Judah
- Major cult center: Jerusalem
- Abode: Edom; Sinai
- Symbol: Winged sun Winged wheel
- Adherents: Yahwists
- Texts: Hebrew Bible (Judaism, Christianity); Samaritan Torah (Samaritanism)
- Region: Ancient Canaan; Ancient Israel and Judah
- Ethnic group: Canaanites; Israelites
- Parents: El (tentative, period dependent)
- Consorts: Asherah (tentative, period dependent), Anat (tentative; Elephantine, period dependent)

Yahweh (Note: /ˈjɑːhweɪ/, or often /ˈjɑːweɪ/ in English; 𐤉𐤄𐤅𐤄 in Paleo-Hebrew; reconstructed in block script: *יַהְוֶה *Yahwe, [jahˈwe]) was an ancient Semitic deity in the southeastern ancient Levant that became the national god of the Iron Age kingdoms of Israel-Samaria and Judah. The precise geographical origin of Yahweh-worship is a matter of debate; most scholars favor a southern origin hypothesis. The worship of the deity goes back to at least the early Iron Age and possibly the late Bronze Age.

Many scholars think that the Israelites probably engaged in polytheistic practices, because the Israelite religion was a derivative of the Canaanite religion and included a variety of deities from it, including El, Asherah, and Baal. Yahweh likely became conflated with El in later centuries, taking his place as the head of the pantheon in the Israelite religion. El's consort Asherah became associated with Yahweh, and El-linked epithets, such as ʾĒl Šadday (אֵל שַׁדַּי), came to be applied to him alone. Characteristics of other deities, such as Asherah and Baal, were also selectively absorbed in conceptions of Yahweh.

According to a pious interpretation, Jews began to substitute other Hebrew words—primarily ăḏōnāy (אֲדֹנָי, lit. 'My Lords')—in place of the name Yahweh during the Second Temple period. By the time of the Jewish–Roman wars following the Roman siege of Jerusalem and the concomitant destruction of the Second Temple in 70 CE, the original pronunciation of the name of the deity was forgotten entirely.

Additionally, Yahweh is invoked in the Imperial Aramaic-language Papyrus Amherst 63 from ancient Egypt, and also in Jewish or Jewish-influenced ancient Greek-language Greek Magical Papyri in Roman Egypt dated to the 1st to 5th centuries CE.

== Name ==
The deity's name was written in Paleo-Hebrew as 𐤉𐤄𐤅𐤄 (יהוה in block script), transliterated as YHWH; modern scholarship has reached consensus to transcribe this as "Yahweh". The shortened forms Yeho-, Yahu-, Yah- and Yo- appear in personal names (e.g. Joel, Isaiah, Joshua) and in phrases such as "Hallelujah!" Over time, the sacrality of the name, as well as the Commandment against "taking the name 'in vain' ", led to increasingly strict Jewish prohibitions on speaking or writing the term. Rabbinic sources suggest that, by the Second Temple period, the name of their god was officially pronounced only once a year by the High Priest on the Day of Atonement. After the destruction of Jerusalem in 70 CE, the original pronunciation of the name was forgotten entirely.

The four-letter form of the name is commonly called the Tetragrammaton.

== History ==
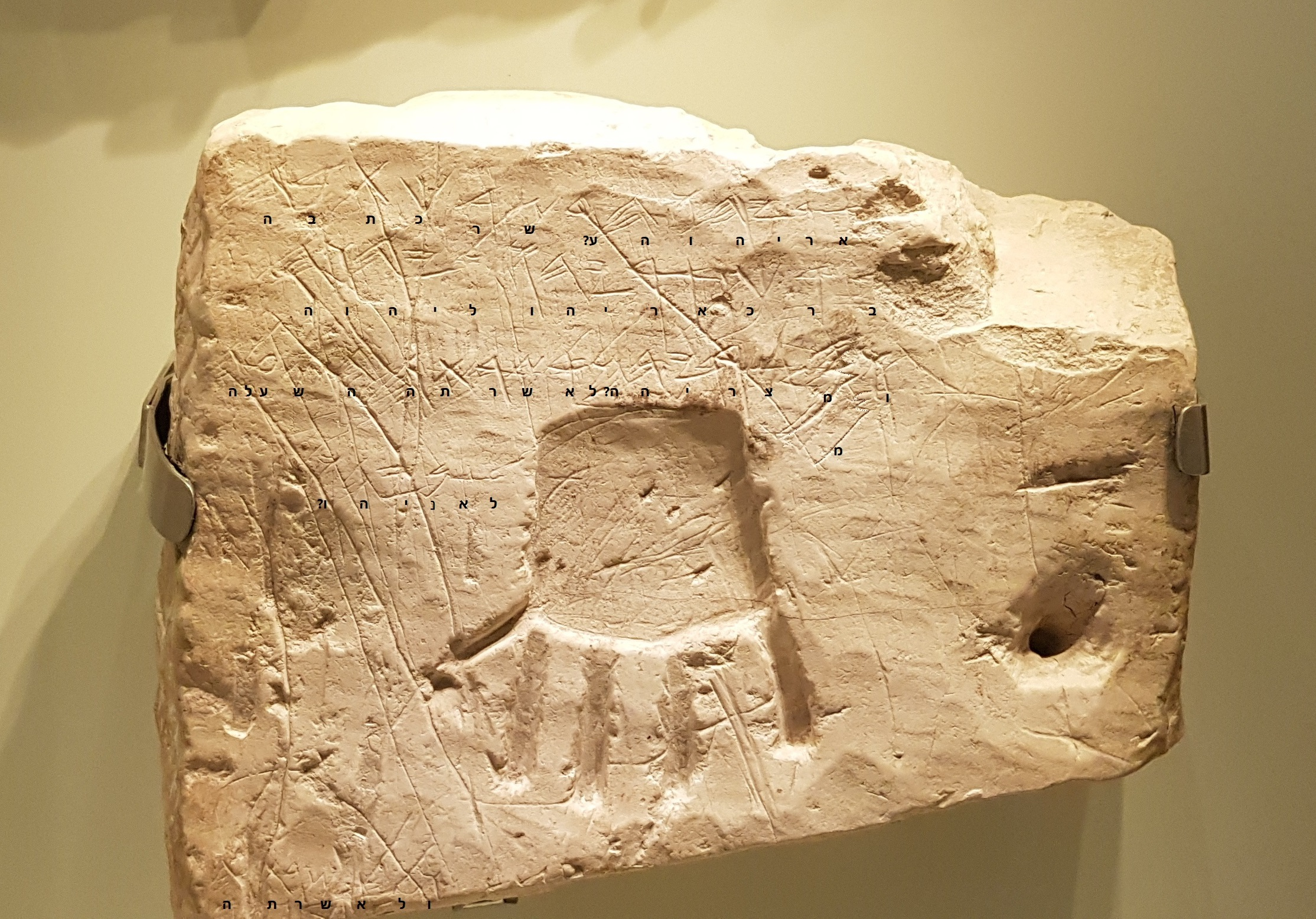
Uriyahu inscription, Khirbet el-Qom, 8th c. BCE, "Blessed is/be Uriyahu by Yahweh"

=== Periods ===
Philip King and Lawrence Stager place the history of Yahweh into the following periods:

- Late Bronze: 1550–1200 BCE
- Iron Age I: 1200–1000 BCE
- Iron Age II: 1000–586 BCE
- Neo-Babylonian: 586–539 BCE
- Persian: 539–332 BCE

Other academic terms often used include First Temple period, from the construction of the Temple in 957 BCE to its destruction in 586 BCE, exilic for the period of the Exile from 586 to 539 BCE (identical with Neo-Babylonian above), post-Exilic for later periods and Second Temple period from the reconstruction of the Temple in 515 BCE until its destruction in 70 CE.

=== Late Bronze Age (1550–1200 BCE) ===
There is almost no agreement on the deity's origins.

Yahweh is not attested other than among the Israelites, and there is no consensus on its etymology, with ehyeh ašer ehyeh ('I Am that I Am'), the explanation presented in Exodus 3:14, appearing to be a late theological gloss invented at a time when the original meaning had been forgotten, although some scholars dispute this. Theodor Lewis connects the name to the Amorite element yahwi- (ia-wi), found in personal names in Mari texts, meaning 'brings to life' / 'causes to exist' (e.g., yahwi-dagan = "Dagon causes to exist"), commonly denoted as the semantic equivalent of the Akkadian ibašši-DN; though Frank Moore Cross emphasized that the Amorite verbal form is of interest only in attempting to reconstruct the verbal root of the name "Yahweh", and that attempts to take yahwi- as a divine epithet should be "vigorously" argued against. In addition, J. Philip Hyatt believes it is more likely that yahwi- refers to a god creating and sustaining the life of a newborn child rather than the universe. This conception of God was more popular among ancient Near Easterners but eventually, the Israelites removed the association of yahwi- to any human ancestor and combined it with other elements (e.g., Yahweh ṣəḇāʾōṯ). Hillel Ben-Sasson states there is insufficient evidence for Amorites using yahwi- for gods, but he argues that it mirrors other theophoric names and that yahwi-, or more accurately yawi, derives from the root hwy in pa'al, which means "he will be".

One scholarly theory is that "Yahweh" originated in a shortened form of ˀel ḏū yahwī ṣabaˀôt, 'El who creates the hosts', which Cross considered to be one of the cultic names of El. However, this phrase is nowhere attested either inside or outside the Bible, and the two gods are in any case quite dissimilar, with El being elderly and paternal and lacking Yahweh's association with the storm and battles. Even if the above issues are resolved, Yahweh is generally agreed to have a non-causative etymology because otherwise, YHWH would be translated as YHYH. It also raises the question of why the Israelites would want to shorten the epithet. One possible reason includes the co-existence of religious modernism and conservatism being the norm in all religions.

Scholar Gérard Nissim Amzallag, from the Ben-Gurion University, has posited that Yahweh was originally portrayed as a fire deity, associated with volcanic activity and metallurgy. Amzallag explains that Gods of metallurgy in the past (Bronze Age) were revered not only as the Gods of weapons but also Gods of creation.

The oldest plausible occurrence of Yahweh's name is in the Egyptian demonym tꜣ šꜣsw Yhwꜣ, 'YHWA [in] the Land of the Shasu' (Egyptian: 𓇌𓉔𓍯𓄿 Yhwꜣ) in an inscription at Soleb from the time of Amenhotep III (1390–1352 BCE), the Shasu being nomads from Midian and Edom in northern Arabia. Although it is still uncertain whether a relationship exists between the toponym yhwꜣ and theonym YHWH, the dominant view is that Yahweh was from the southern region associated with Seir, Edom, Paran and Teman. There is considerable although not universal support for this view, but it raises the question of how Yahweh made his way to the north. An answer many scholars consider plausible is the Kenite hypothesis, which holds that traders brought Yahweh to Israel along the caravan routes between Egypt and Canaan. This ties together various points of data, such as the absence of Yahweh from Canaan, his links with Edom and Midian in the biblical stories, and the Kenite or Midianite ties of Moses, but its major weaknesses are that the majority of Israelites were firmly rooted in Palestine, while the historical role of Moses is problematic. It follows that if the Kenite hypothesis is to be maintained, then it must be assumed that the Israelites encountered Yahweh (and the Midianites/Kenites) inside Israel and through their association with the earliest political leaders of Israel. Christian Frevel argues that inscriptions allegedly suggesting Yahweh's southern origins (e.g., "YHWH of Teman") may simply denote his presence there at later times, and that Teman can refer to any southern territory, including Judah.

Alternatively, some scholars argue that YHWH worship was rooted in the indigenous culture of the Kingdom of Israel and was promoted in the Kingdom of Judah by the Omrides. Frevel suggests that Hazael's conquests in the Kingdom of Israel forced the two kingdoms to cooperate, which spread YHWH worship among Judean commoners. Previously, YHWH was viewed as the patron god of the Judean state.

=== Early Iron Age (1200–1000 BCE) ===
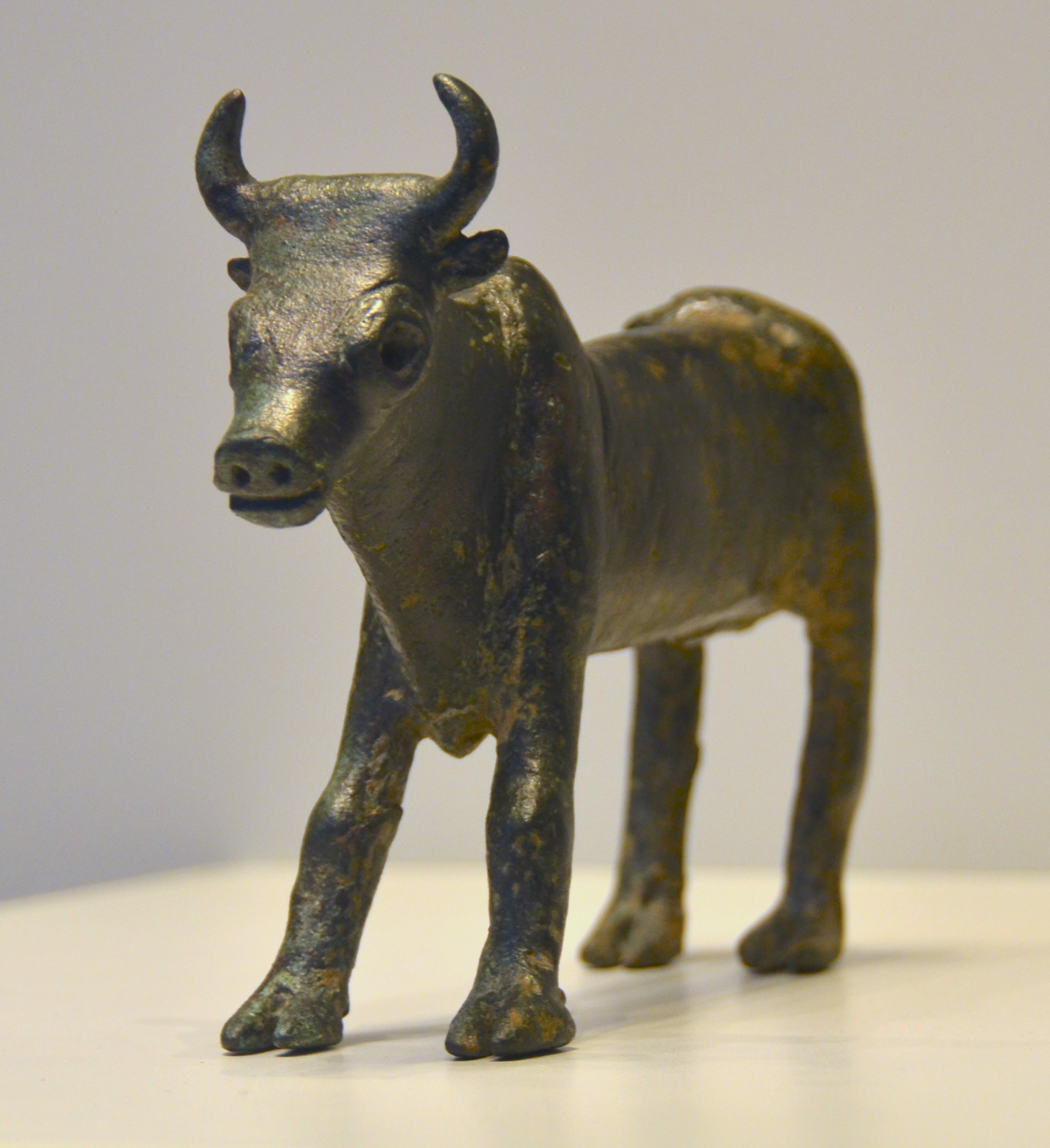
Early Iron Age bull figurine from Bull Site at Dhahrat et-Tawileh (modern West Bank, ancient Ephraim), representing El, Baal or Yahweh

In the Early Iron Age, the modern consensus is that there was no distinction in language or material culture between Canaanites and Israelites. Scholars accordingly define Israelite culture as a subset of Canaanite culture.

According to Jo Ann Hackett, Yahweh has characteristics of a storm god typical of ancient Near Eastern myths earliest in the Biblical literature, marching out from Edom or the Sinai desert with the heavenly host of stars and planets that make up his army to do battle with the enemies of his people Israel:

Yahweh, when you went out of Seir,
when you marched out of the field of Edom,
the earth trembled, the sky also dropped.
Yes, the clouds dropped water.
The mountains quaked at Yahweh's presence,
even Sinai at the presence of Yahweh, the God of Israel.
...
From the sky the stars fought.
From their courses, they fought against Sisera.

— Book of Judges 5:4–5, 20, WEB World English Bible, the Song of Deborah

Alternatively, parts of the storm god imagery could derive from Baal.

From the perspective of the Kenite hypothesis, it has also been suggested that the Edomite deity Qōs might have been one and the same as Yahweh, rather than a separate deity, with its name a title of the latter. Aside from their common territorial origins, various common characteristics between the Yahwist cult and the Edomite cult of Qōs hint at a shared connection. Doeg the Edomite, for example, is depicted as having no problem in worshiping Yahweh and is shown to be at home in Jewish sanctuaries.

Unlike the chief god of the Ammonites (Milcom) and the Moabites (Chemosh), the Tanakh refrains from explicitly naming the Edomite Qōs. Some scholars have explained this notable omission by assuming that the level of similarity between Yahweh and Qōs would have made rejection of the latter difficult. Other scholars hold that Yahweh and Qōs were different deities from their origins, and suggest that the tensions between Judeans and Edomites during the Second Temple period may lie behind the omission of Qōs in the Bible.

=== Late Iron Age (1000–586 BCE) ===
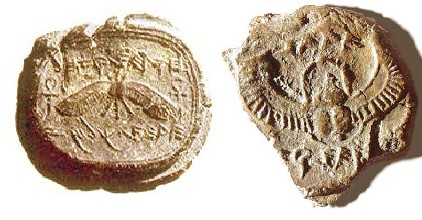
Seal of Hezekiah, 727 to 698. The winged disk is thought to represent Yahweh.

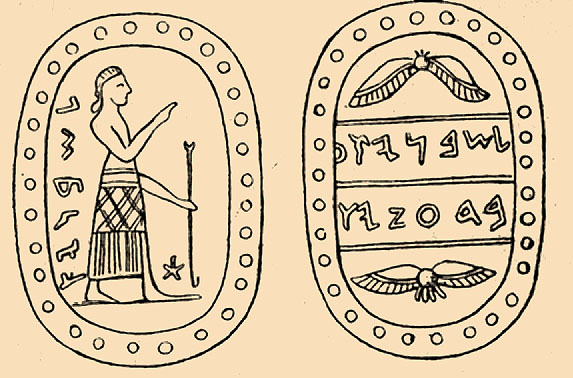
Winged disk seal reproduced in the Jewish Encyclopedia, 1906

Michael D. Coogan wrote "Many biblical writers frequently used polytheistic concepts, depicting Yahweh as the head of a large pantheon whose members advised him and celebrated his accomplishments. This pantheon functioned, as in Mesopotamian and Greek religion, as a kind of divine council or assembly, under the rule of the high god."

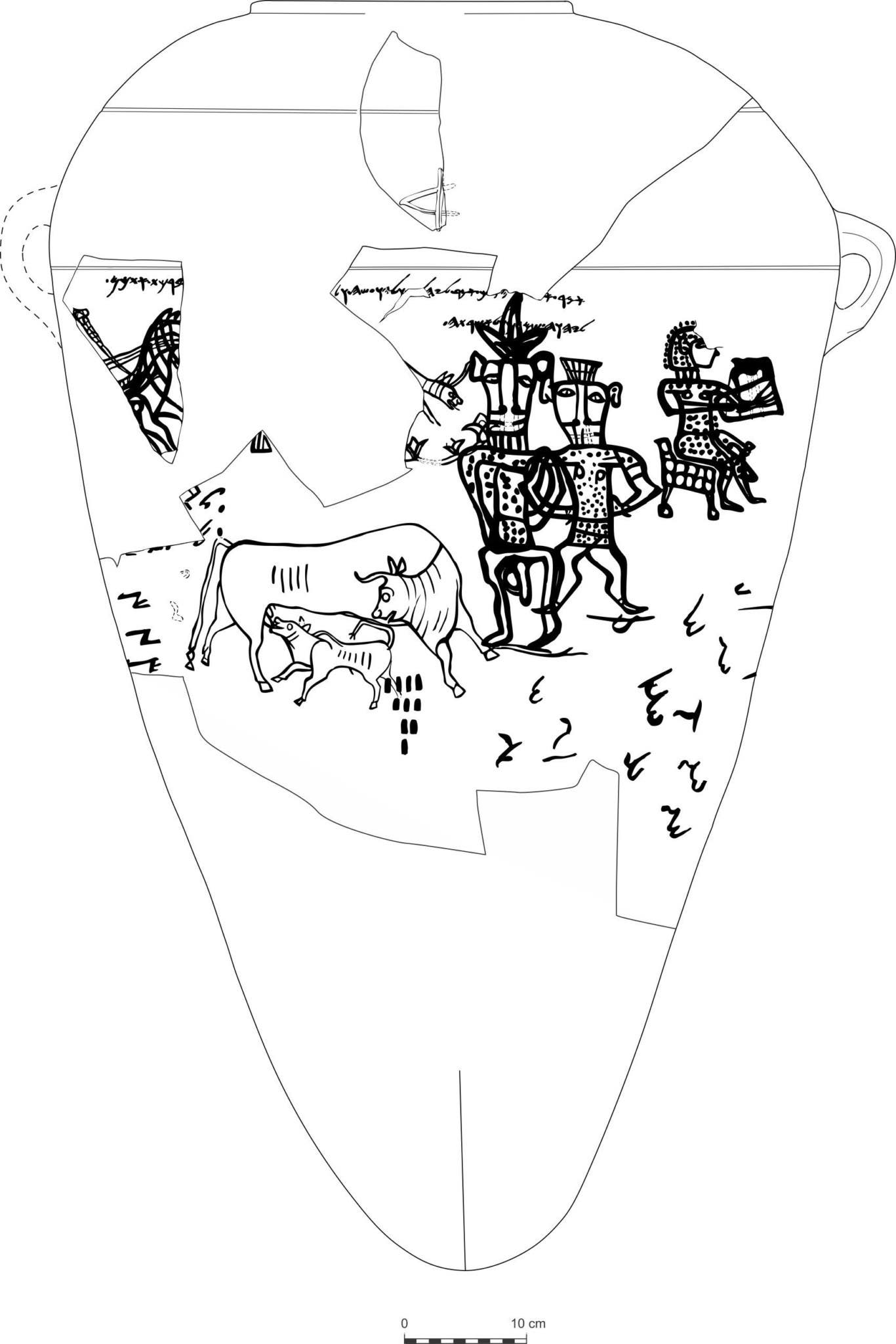
Painting on a jar found at Kuntillet Ajrud, under the inscription "Yahweh of Samaria and his Asherah" (c. 800 BCE)

The late Iron Age saw the emergence of nation states associated with specific national gods: Chemosh was the god of the Moabites, Milcom the god of the Ammonites, Qōs the god of the Edomites, and Yahweh the god of the Israelites. In each kingdom the king was also the head of the national religion and thus the viceroy on Earth of the national god. Yahweh filled the role of national god in both the Kingdom of Israel, which emerged in the 10th century BCE, and in Kingdom of Judah, which may have emerged a century later (no "God of Judah" is mentioned anywhere in the Bible).

Accordingly, some scholarly reconstructions have proposed there were different tiers of deities in the original pantheon: El and Asherah on top; followed by their children, the divine assembly; then followed by traders and craftsman deities; and finally minor deities or messenger gods. It has been argued that Yahweh was originally described as one of the sons of El in Deuteronomy 32:8–9, and that this was removed by a later emendation to the text:

When the Most High gave the nations their inheritance,
when he divided up humankind,
he set the boundaries of the peoples,
according to the number of the heavenly assembly.
For the Lord's allotment is his people,
Jacob is his special possession.

— Book of Deuteronomy 32:8–9, New English Translation, Song of Moses

However, at some point the second tier collapsed, whereupon Yahweh became conflated with El, even though El was the original head of the pantheon. During the reign of Ahab, and particularly following his marriage to Jezebel, Baal may have briefly replaced Yahweh as the national god of Israel (but not Judah).

In the 9th century BCE, there are indications of rejection of Baal worship associated with the prophets Elijah and Elisha. The Yahweh-religion thus began to separate itself from its Canaanite heritage; this process continued over the period from 800 to 500 BCE with legal and prophetic condemnations of the asherim, sun worship and worship on the high places, along with practices pertaining to the dead and other aspects of the old religion. Features of Baal, El, and Asherah were absorbed into Yahweh, and epithets such as El Shaddai came to be applied to Yahweh alone.

In this atmosphere a struggle emerged between those who believed that Yahweh alone should be worshipped, and those who worshipped him within a larger group of gods; the Yahweh-alone party, the party of the prophets and Deuteronomists, ultimately triumphed, and their victory lies behind the biblical narrative of an Israel vacillating between periods of "following other gods" and periods of fidelity to Yahweh.

Some scholars argue that early supporters of a monolatrist Yahwism faction appear in the 9th–8th centuries BCE, during the time of Elijah and Hosea. By ascending to the role of the "Lord of the Land" (adon), he also absorbs the functions of earlier deities, such as Baal and El. However, this depiction of Yahweh still had only marginal impact under Josiah, and did not become lasting until the exilic and post-exilic period. (Note: Monolatrists believing Yahweh was the only god worthy of Israelite worship, as opposed to monotheists believing that Yahweh was the only god in existence—a noticeable departure from the traditional beliefs of the Israelites nonetheless.) Only in the post-exilic and prophetic writings, and under influence of Zoroastrianism, Yahweh becomes a distant and more merciful supreme deity. It is also only then that Elohim, a term previously referring to the Canaanite High God, becomes an alternative designation for Yahweh. According to some scholars this reconsideration of the former pantheon derives from the monotheistic concept of Persian beliefs at the time, as generally agreed upon by scholars.

Some scholars date the start of widespread monotheism to the 8th century BCE, and view it as a response to Neo-Assyrian aggression. In an inscription discovered in Ein Gedi and dated around 700 BCE, Yahweh appears described as the lord of "the nations", while in other contemporary texts discovered in Khirbet Beit Lei (near Lachish) he is mentioned as the ruler of Jerusalem and probably also of Judah.

=== Babylonian exile ===
According to some scholars, in the national crisis of the Babylonian exile, Yahweh is described as the sole deity, and is argued to have absorbed attributes of previous gods and goddesses. According to John Day, the remaining deities then became subordinate angels. The notion of Yahweh as a supreme deity is described in the Second Isaiah, datable to the 6th century BCE. The author's praise for Yahweh is motivated by restoring Israel's confidence into their own historical gods against the deities of their Babylonian enemies. The claim for monotheism is directed against the deities of Nebuchadnezzar II, who founded his reign on Marduk and Nabu. The transition was a gradual one and was not totally accomplished during the First Temple period. At Elephantine, some Jews appear to have worshipped Yahweh and Anath as distinct from Asherah and El during the 5th century BCE.

=== Hellenistic influence ===
According to some scholars due to Hellenistic influence, Yahwistic beliefs became more exclusive. These beliefs rejected the idea of lesser deities and emanations of deities in favor of Yahweh as an abstract single god. During the Hellenistic period, the scriptures were translated into Greek by the Jews of the Egyptian diaspora. Greek translations of the Hebrew scriptures render both the names Yahweh and adonai as kyrios (κύριος), meaning 'Lord'. Jewish tradition celebrated Yahweh's name at least once a year at the temple by the High Priests at the Day of Atonement. However, after the destruction of the Second Temple, Yahweh's name ceased to be used.

The Secret Book of John reinterpreted the Genesis story under Hellenistic influence and proposes that Eve copulated with Yaldabaoth and gave birth to two sons: Cain and Abel, identified with Yahweh and Elohim respectively. The former is said to be righteous and the latter unjust. By murdering his brother, and corrupted by his father, he brings envy and death into the world.

== Worship ==
=== Festivals and sacrifice ===
The centre of Yahweh's worship lay in three great annual festivals coinciding with major events in rural life: Passover with the birthing of lambs, Shavuot with the cereal harvest, and Sukkot with the fruit harvest. These probably pre-dated the arrival of the Yahweh religion, but they became linked to events in the national mythos of Israel: Passover with the exodus from Egypt, Shavuot with the law-giving at Mount Sinai, and Sukkot with the wilderness wanderings. The festivals thus celebrated Yahweh's salvation of Israel and Israel's status as his holy people, although the earlier agricultural meaning was not entirely lost. His worship presumably involved sacrifice, but many scholars have concluded that the rituals detailed in Leviticus 1–16, with their stress on purity and atonement, were introduced only after the Babylonian exile, and that in reality any head of a family was able to offer sacrifice as occasion demanded. A number of scholars have also drawn the conclusion that infant sacrifice, whether to the underworld deity Molech or to Yahweh himself, was a part of Israelite/Judahite religion until the reforms of King Josiah in the late 7th century BCE. Sacrifice was presumably complemented by the singing or recital of psalms, but again the details are scant. Prayer played little role in official worship.

=== Temples ===
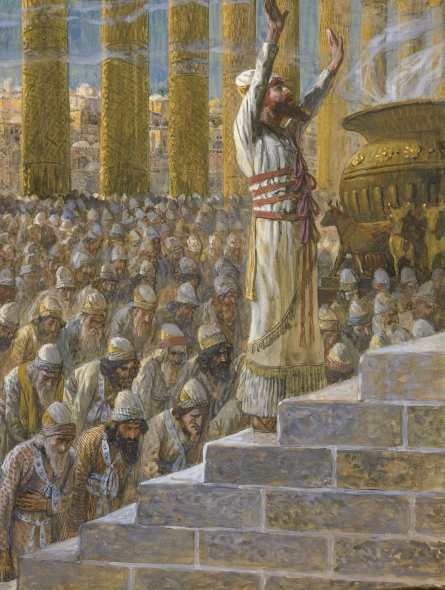
Solomon dedicates the Temple at Jerusalem (painting by James Tissot or follower, c. 1896–1902).

The Hebrew Bible gives the impression that the Jerusalem temple was always meant to be the central or even sole temple of Yahweh, but this was not the case. The earliest known Israelite place of worship is a 12th-century BCE open-air altar in the hills of Samaria featuring a bronze bull reminiscent of Canaanite Bull-El (El in the form of a bull) and the archaeological remains of further temples have been found at Dan on Israel's northern border, at Arad in the Negev and Beersheba, both in the territory of Judah. Shiloh, Bethel, Gilgal, Mizpah, Ramah and Dan were also major sites for festivals, sacrifices, the making of vows, private rituals, and the adjudication of legal disputes.

=== Portrayal ===
Many scholars argue that prohibition of depictions of Yahweh are a late idea and entered around the age of the Deuteronomy texts. There is no universally accepted explanation for such aniconism, and a number of scholars have argued that Yahweh was in fact represented prior to the reforms of Hezekiah and Josiah late in the monarchic period: to quote one study, "[a]n early aniconism, de facto or otherwise, is purely a projection of the post-exilic imagination". Joseph Blenkinsopp considered the aniconic nature of the Persian religion of Zoroastrianism as a proposed source. Other scholars like Theodore. J. Lewis, argue that there is no certain evidence of any anthropomorphic representation of Yahweh during the pre-exilic period.

Some scholars have argued that Yahweh had a corporeal body, however they vary in its specificity. Benjamin D. Sommer states that in Mesopotamian, Egyptian and Canaanite religions, gods were not limited to an individual state, but a single deity could possess numerous distinct forms. He introduces and argues for a monotheistic "fluidity model", where Yahweh was seen as having multiple bodies, and could fragment, manifesting in various localized contexts simultaneously. Mark S. Smith instead proposes a spatial typology, involving divine bodies of Yahweh that vary by size and scale. One is of human-scale with a physical body manifested on earth, common in Genesis narratives. Another is a radiant superhuman-sized form, experienced during mountain related interactions, such as in Exodus. Lastly, a more ambiguous celestial body located within the heavens in visions like Ezekiel.

Esther J. Hamori, discusses the human anthropomorphisms and theophanies of Yahweh in the context of the ancient near-east and philosophical approaches. For Hamori, the physical embodiment of a tangible entity with a concrete form is a recurring feature in the Hebrew Bible.

Richard Elliott Friedman identified differences in the conceptions of the God under source criticism. In the J, E, and D sources, Yahweh appears more personal, moving around on earth, taking visible forms, engaging in discussion, and smelling offerings. While P sources may have attempted to make the God more cosmic, distant and transcendent.

Francesca Stavrakopoulou takes an anatomical and direct comparative approach, arguing Yahweh was conceived as "a human-shaped deity who walks and talks and weeps and laughs, who eats, sleeps, feels, and breathes, and who is undeniably male". By contrast, R. W. L. Moberly in a response to Stavrakopoulou, outlined that many anthropomorphic terms and descriptions used in her argumentation, are better understood as being metaphorical rather than taken literally.

It has been viewed that when ancient Jews had the obligation to see the face of Yahweh three times per year; quite probably it literally meant to see the deity.

== Greco-Roman syncretism ==
Yahweh is frequently invoked in Greco-Roman magical texts dating between the 2nd century BCE and the 5th century CE, most notably in the Greek Magical Papyri, under the names Iao, Adonai, Sabaoth, and Eloai. In these texts, he is often mentioned alongside traditional Greco-Roman deities and Egyptian deities. The archangels Michael, Gabriel, Raphael, and Ouriel and Jewish cultural heroes such as Abraham, Jacob, and Moses are also invoked frequently. The frequent occurrence of Yahweh's name was likely due to Greek and Roman folk magicians seeking to make their spells more powerful through the invocation of a prestigious foreign deity.

A coin issued by Pompey to celebrate his successful conquest of Judaea showed a kneeling, bearded figure grasping a branch (a common Roman symbol of submission) subtitled Bacchivs Ivdaevs, which may be translated as either "The Jewish Bacchus" or "Bacchus the Judaean". The figure has been interpreted as depicting Yahweh as a local variety of Bacchus, that is, Dionysus. However, as coins minted with such iconography ordinarily depicted subjected persons, and not the gods of a subjected people, some have assumed the coin simply depicts the surrender of a Judean who was called "Bacchius", sometimes identified as the Hasmonean king Aristobulus II, who was overthrown by Pompey's campaign.

In any event, Tacitus, John the Lydian, Cornelius Labeo, and Marcus Terentius Varro similarly identify Yahweh with Bacchus–Dionysus. Jews themselves frequently used symbols that were also associated with Dionysus such as kylixes, amphorae, leaves of ivy, and clusters of grapes, a similarity Plutarch used to argue that Jews worshipped a hypostasized form of Bacchus–Dionysus. In his Quaestiones Convivales, Plutarch further notes that the Jews hail their god with cries of "Euoi" and "Sabi", phrases associated with the worship of Dionysus. According to Sean M. McDonough, Greek speakers may have confused Aramaic words such as Sabbath, Alleluia, or even possibly some variant of the name Yahweh itself, for more familiar terms associated with Dionysus.

Other Roman writers, such as Juvenal, Petronius, and Florus, identified Yahweh with the god Caelus.

== See also ==
- Assemblies of Yahweh
- Historicity of the Bible
- Jehovah
- Names of God in Christianity
- Names of God in Judaism
- Sacred Name Movement
- Theophany
- Tutelary deity
