= Friedrich Wilhelm Ghillany =

German historian and theologian (1807–1876)

Friedrich Wilhelm Ghillany (18 April 1807 in Erlangen – 26 June 1876) was a German Lutheran theologian, historian, librarian and publicist.

His rationalist outlook, influenced by Georg Friedrich Daumer, forced him to retire from his post as vicar at St. Aegidius parish in Nuremberg. He became city librarian in Nuremberg in 1841. His early publications are pamphlets against Lutheran bigotry, specifically agitating against the Old Lutheran president of the Lutheran assembly in Munich, Friedrich von Roth. In 1855, Ghillany moved to Munich, but he did not succeed in finding employment as a civil servant or diplomat, and he went on to publish multi-volume works on European history. He also continued to publish on religious topics, but now under a pseudonym.

== Bibliography ==
- Die Menschenopfer der alten Hebraeer (1842) on the question of reflexes of prehistoric human sacrifice in the text of the Hebrew Bible.
- Geschichte des Seefahrers Martin Behaim (Leipzig 1853)
- Diplomatisches Handbuch. Sammlung der wichtigsten europäischen Friedensschlüsse (Nördlingen 1855–68, 3 vols.)
- Nürnberg, historisch und geographisch (Munich 1863)
- Europäische Chronik, von 1492 bis Ende April 1877 (Leipzig 1865–78, 5 vols.)

pseudonymously, as von der Alm:

- Theologische Briefe an die Gebildeten der deutschen Nation" (1863, 3 vols.)
- Die Urteile heidnischer und jüdischer Schriftsteller der vier ersten christlichen Jahrhunderte über Jesus (1864); excerpted as Jesus von Nazareth (1870) under the pseudonym Eugen Braun.
