= Hermann Guthe (theologian) =

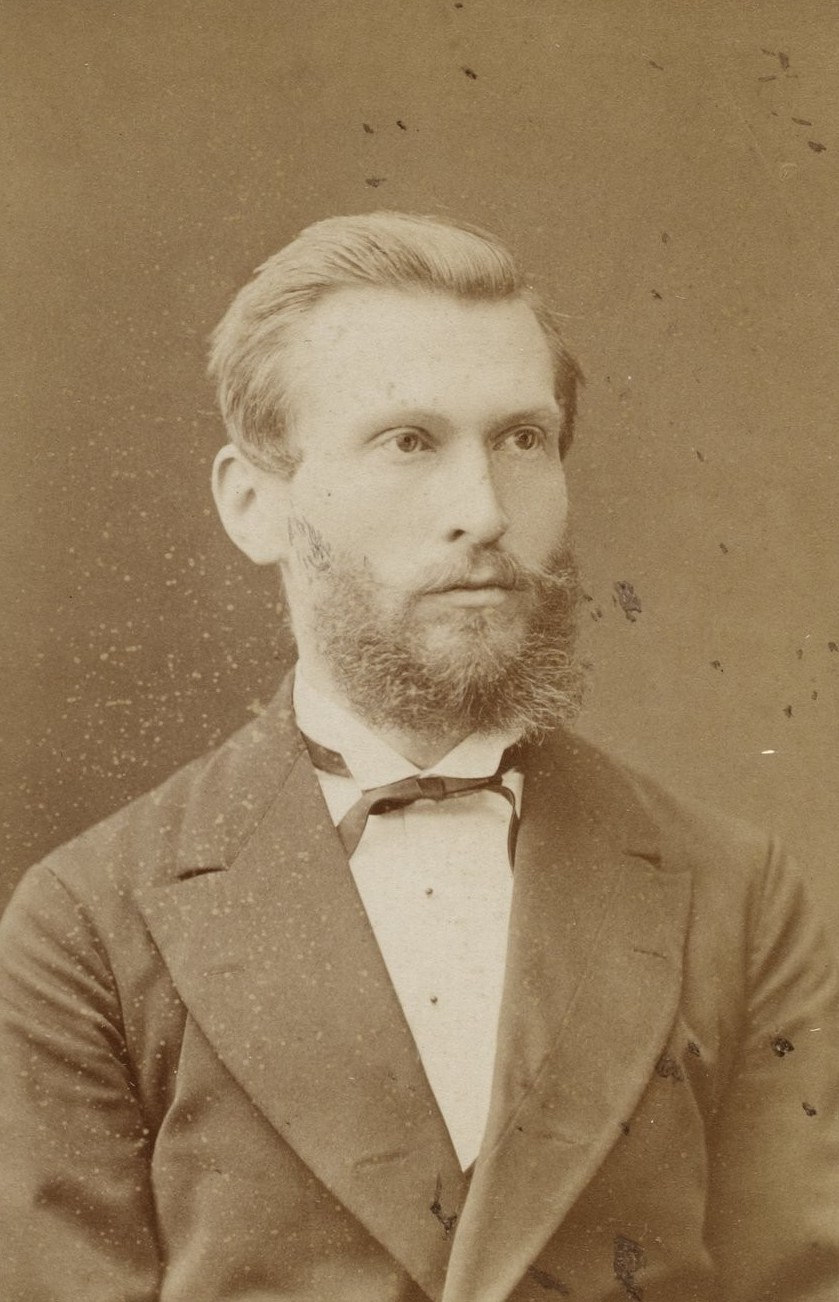

Hermann Guthe (10 May 1849 - 11 August 1936) was a German Semitic scholar.

He was educated at Göttingen and Erlangen, and afterwards worked for several years as a private tutor. In 1884 he became a professor of Old Testament exegesis at Leipzig University.

From 1877 to 1896 he edited the Zeitschrift, and from 1897 to 1906 the Mitteilungen and Nachrichten, of the German Palästina-Verein, full name: Deutscher Verein zur Erforschung Palästinas ("German Association for the Study of Palestine"), which he co-founded in 1877.

In 1881 and 1894 he traveled in Palestine. On the first trip he participated in an excavation on the southeast hill of Jerusalem, and in 1894 and 1912, he was in Palestine in order to determine research opportunities on behalf of the association.

== Published works ==
He wrote on some of the minor prophets in Emil Friedrich Kautzsch's translation of the Old Testament and a metrical version of Amos (1907) with Eduard Sievers. His published work was in the fields of philology and religion and of archæology and topography, the more important titles being:

- Ausgrabungen bei Jerusalem (1883) – Excavations in Jerusalem.
- Palæstina in Bild und Wort (1883–84), with Georg Ebers
- Das Zukunftsbild Jesaias (1885).
- Palæstina (1908).
- Bibel-Atlas (1911).
- Geschichte des Volkes Israel (third edition, 1912).

He was also a contributor to the 1903 Encyclopaedia Biblica.

== References and external links ==
- Friedrich Wilhelm Bautz: Guthe, Hermann. In: Biographisch-Bibliographisches Kirchenlexikon (BBKL). Band 2, Bautz, Hamm 1990, ISBN 3-88309-032-8, Sp. 404–405.
