= Yahwism =

Religion of ancient Israel and Judah

Yahwism Israelite religion
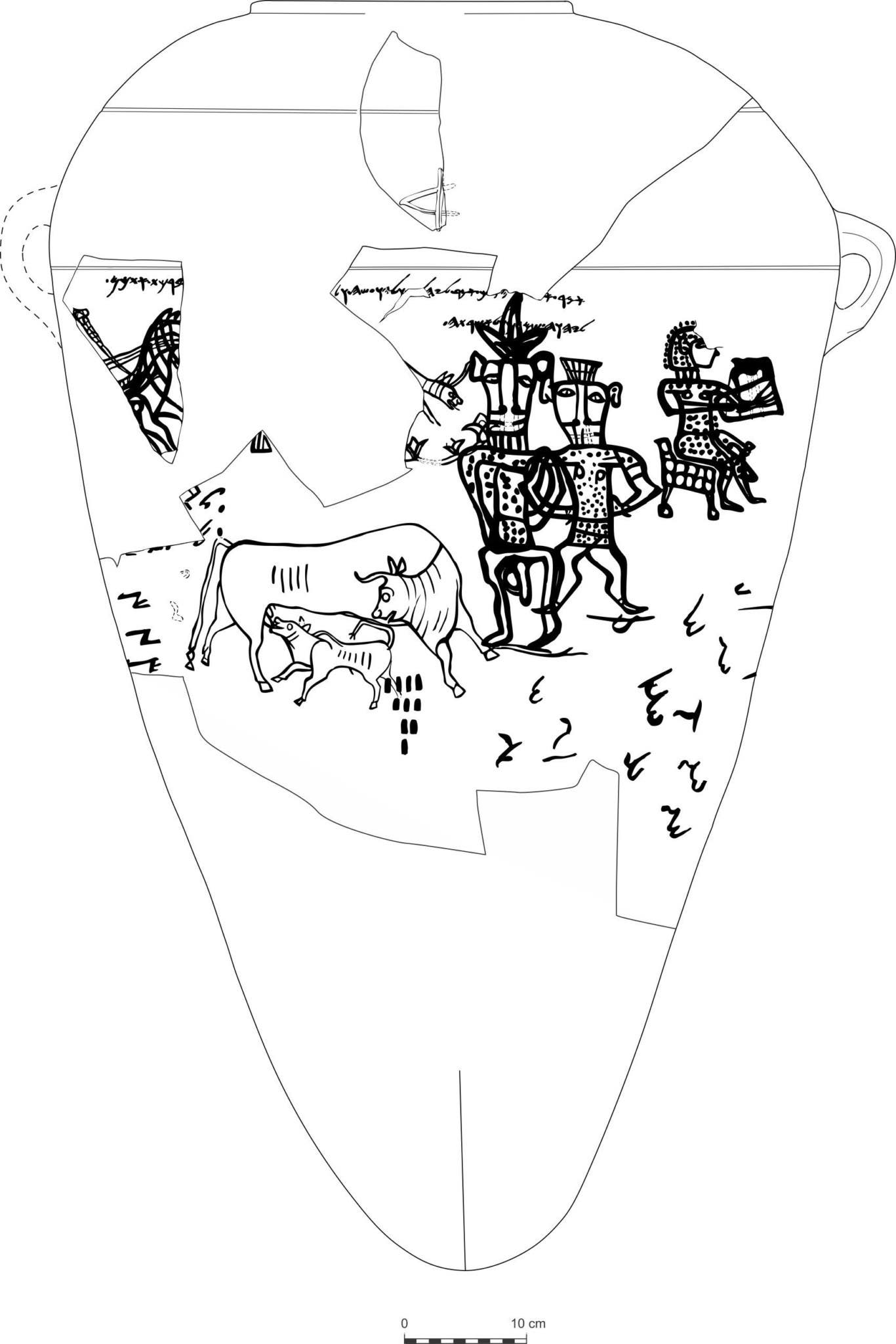
- Sherd of a pithos found at Kuntillet Ajrud, bearing the inscription Yahweh and his Asherah
- Classification: Ancient Semitic religion
- Region: Ancient Canaan; Ancient Israel and Judah
- Territory: Kingdom of Judah; Kingdom of Israel
- Origin: c. 12th – 9th century BCE
- Separated from: Canaanite religion
- Separations: Judaism; Samaritanism

Yahwism, also known as the Israelite religion, was an ancient religion practiced by the people of ancient Israel and Judah. Israelite religion was closely related to Canaanite religion (Note: "Thus, Israelite religion in the settlement period appears strongly rooted in the local Canaanite tradition.") and not originally monotheistic at its core. (Note: "Recent critical accounts provide a more detailed socio-historical context for monotheism’s development and have fewer difficulties in explaining pre-exilic religious practice. They do not assume that Israelite religion began with a monotheistic heritage as its core, but instead hold that the early Israelites had similar beliefs to their neighbors in late second millennium Palestine, such as the belief in a small, functional, and differentiated pantheon.") It takes its name from Yahweh, a national god of the kingdoms of Judah and Israel. Ancient Israel and Judah had a shared religious tradition of the cultic worship of Yahweh. Archaeological evidence indicates that some Israelites worshipped other gods including Baal, Mot, Shamash, and Yarikh; (Note: "Both the texts of the HB/OT and the extrabiblical evidence show a strong coincidence for the veneration of El, Baʿal, Mot, Šalim, the moon god Yariḥ, MLK/Milku, and Asherah as YHWH’s consort alongside the national god.") some of these are named in Biblical texts. There is also evidence that Yahweh was associated with a female consort, the goddess Asherah, though some scholars disagree. Yahwistic practice included festivals, ritual sacrifices, vow-making, private rituals, and the religious adjudication of legal disputes.

Yahwistic practices were associated with a number of sites in Israel, Judah, and Samaria, including the Temple in Jerusalem. The temple, while not the sole or central place of worship dedicated to Yahweh, was an important symbol for the Israelite king, who was thought to lead the national religion as the worldly viceroy of the national god.

Yahwism evolved amidst the political turbulence of the 7th and 6th centuries BCE, between the destruction of Samaria in 722 and the fall of Jerusalem in 587. By the end of the Babylonian exile, Yahweh was proclaimed the creator deity and the sole deity worthy of worship by the Israelites. With the establishment of Yehud Medinata in the 4th century BCE, Yahwism coalesced into what is known as Second Temple Judaism, from which the Abrahamic religions of Judaism, Samaritanism, Christianity and Islam would later emerge.

== History ==
=== Records and developments ===
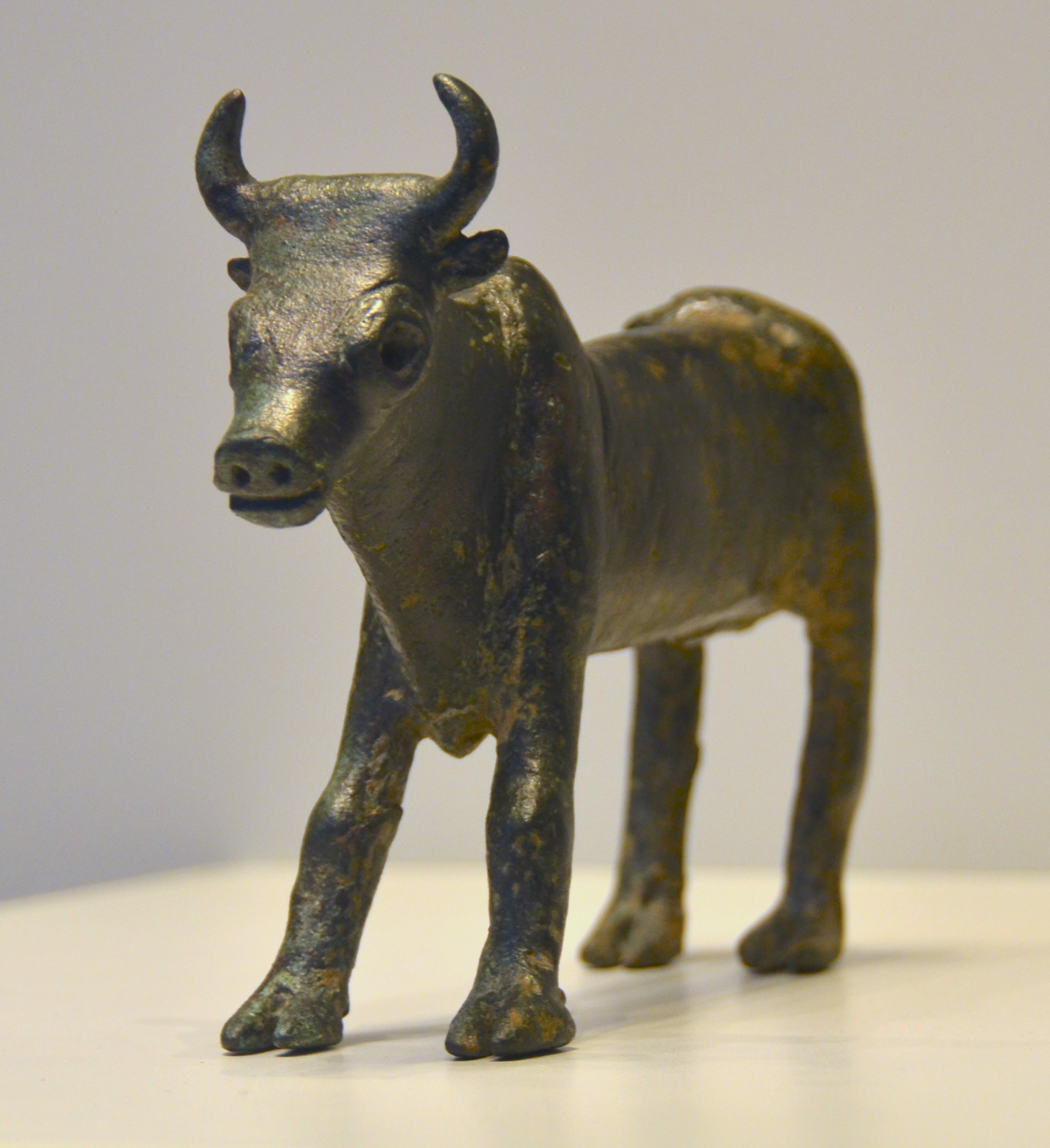
A bronze bull statuette discovered at the 12th-century BCE "Bull Site" in Samaria

The central element of ancient Israel's religion through most of the monarchic period was the worship of a god named Yahweh. Yahweh was the Israelite successor to a god called "El",, the head of the Canaanite pantheon, whose name forms the basis of the name "Israel" (Hebrew: יִשְׂרָאֵל),. None of the Hebrew patriarchs, tribes of Israel, Judges, or early monarchs have a Yahwistic theophoric name. It is uncertain how, where, or why Yahweh appeared in the Levant; even his name is a point of confusion. The exact date of his first appearance is also ambiguous: the term Israel first enters historical records in the 13th century BCE with the Egyptian Merneptah Stele, though the worship of Yahweh is circumstantially attested to as early as the 12th century BCE. The Gezer calendar, commonly dated to the 10th century BCE, is believed to contain the partially damaged signature of the scribe who wrote it; usually reconstructed as Abijah, which references Yahweh. The earliest reference to Yahweh in the Levant which is universally agreed upon is the 9th century BCE Mesha Stele. Based on this evidence, some scholars posit that Yahweh worship was rooted in the Kingdom of Israel and preserved by the Omride dynasty.

However, the Shasu, who were organized pastoral nomadic tribes in the Southern Levant active from the Jezreel Valley to Ashkelon and in the Transjordan and in the Sinai, worshipped yhwꜣ. Two Egyptian texts, from 14th and 13th century BCE, refer to tꜣ šꜣśw yhwꜣ, i.e. "The Land of the Shasu yhwꜣ". Some scholars have equated yhwꜣ (also rendered as yhw or Yahu) to Yahweh, though there is ongoing contention.

Some scholars maintain that there were Edomites and Midianites worshipping Yahweh as their god by as early as the 14th century BC, centuries before the cult of Yahweh is thought to have originated in Israel. Donald B. Redford has argued that the earliest Israelites, semi-nomadic highlanders in central Canaan mentioned on the Merneptah Stele at the end of the 13th century BCE, are to be identified as a Shasu enclave since later Biblical tradition portrays Yahweh "coming forth from Seʿir". the Shasu, originally from Moab and northern Edom/Seʿir, went on to form one central element in the amalgam that would constitute the "Israel" which later established the Kingdom of Israel. Per his analysis of the Amarna letters, Anson Rainey concluded that the description of the Shasu best fits that of the early Israelites. If this identification is correct, these Israelites/Shasu would have settled in the uplands in small villages with buildings similar to contemporary Canaanite structures towards the end of the 13th century BCE.

Objections exist to this proposed link between the Israelites and the Shasu, given that a group of people in relief at Karnak, which has been suggested as depicting the victory over the Israelites, are not described or depicted as Shasu. (Note: However, Yurco's interpretation of these relief also has been contested. See Merneptah Stele § Karnak reliefs for further information.)Frank J. Yurco and others would distinguish the Shasu in Merneptah's Karnak reliefs from the people of Israel since they wear different clothing and hairstyles and are determined differently by Egyptian scribes. The Shasu are usually depicted hieroglyphically with a determinative indicating a land, not a people, unlike Israelites at the time. Similarly, Lawrence Stager also objected to identifying Merneptah's Shasu with Israelites, since the Shasu are shown dressed differently from the Israelites, who appear as Canaanites. (Note: If the Egyptian scribe was not clear on the nature of the entity he called "Israel," knowing only that it was "different" from the surrounding modalities, then we can imagine something other than a sociocultural Israel. It is possible that Israel represented a confederation of united, but sociologically distinct, modalities that were joined either culturally or politically via treaties and the like. This interpretation of the evidence would allow for the unity implied by the endonymic evidence and also give our scribe some latitude in his use of the determinative.) Though scholars point out that Egyptian scribes tended to bundle up "rather disparate groups of people within a single artificially unifying rubric," and the usefulness of the determinatives has been called into question since in Egyptian writings, including the Merneptah Stele, determinatives are used arbitrarily. The Egyptologist Thomas Schneider connected references to "Yah", believed to be a short form of Yahweh, with the writings in the Shasu-sequence at Soleb and Amarah-West. In an Egyptian Book of the Dead from between Late-13th century BCE to 12th century BCE, Schneider identifies a Northwest Semitic theophoric name ʾadōnī-rō‘ē-yāh, meaning "My lord is the shepherd of Yah", which would be the first documented occurrence of the god Yahweh in a theophoric form.

Regardless of the origins, many scholars believe that the shared worship of Yahweh played a role in the emergence of Israel in the Late Bronze Age (circa 1200 BCE).

The earliest known Israelite place of worship is a 12th-century BCE open-air altar in the hills of Samaria featuring a bronze bull reminiscent of the Canaanite El-bull. Early Israel was a society of rural villages, but in time urban centers grew up and society became more structured and complex. The Hebrew Bible gives the impression that the Jerusalem Temple was always meant to be the central (or even sole) temple of Yahweh, but this was not the case; archaeological remains of other temples have been found at Dan on Israel's northern border; Arad; Beersheba; and Motza in the southern region of Judah. Bethel, Dan, Gilgal, Mizpah, Ramah, and Shiloh were also major sites for festivals, sacrifices, vow-making, private rituals, and the adjudication of legal disputes.

During an era of religious syncretism, it became accepted among the Israelite people to consider the Canaanite god El as the same as Yahweh. El was soon thought to have always been the same deity as Yahweh, as evidenced by Exodus 6:2–3. Additionally, onomastic evidence indicates that some ancient Israelite families in the pre-exilic period seem to have syncretized the other Canaanite deities with Yahweh, a phenomenon which some scholars have described as "an inclusive sort of monolatry". Some scholars posit that different populations of Israelite across separate locales held differing beliefs about El, and likely viewed El as a regional god not intertwined with the monarchic nation-state. El-worshippers thus maintained smaller sacred places to the god rather than temples.

Scholars date the first monotheistic expressions of Yahwism from the 7th and 6th centuries BCE.; arguments that Yahwistic monolatry dates from the premonarchical period have not gained wide acceptance.

=== Transition to Judaism and Samaritanism ===
It is unclear when the Israelites came to worship only one god, and it is probably that monolatry—the worship of one god without denying the existence of others—co-existed with polytheism; the insistence of the Book of Deuteronomy (usually dated 7th century BCE) on worshiping Yahweh alone suggests monolatry may have begun at that time. Some scholars date the start of widespread monotheism to the 8th century BCE, and view it as a response to Neo-Assyrian aggression. Few passages in the Hebrew Bible assert that there is only one god and deny the existence of others; these passages all date to the exilic and post-exilic periods. It is unclear whether the condemnations of the worship of other gods found throughout the Hebrew Bible have any relevance for the period before the Babylonian exile.

In 539 BCE, Babylon fell to the Persians, ending the Babylonian exile. According to Ezra 2, 42,360 of the exiled Israelites returned to Jerusalem. As descendants of the original exiles, they had never lived in Judah; nevertheless, in the view of the authors of the Biblical literature, they, and not those who had remained in the land, were "Israel". Judah, now called Yehud, was a Persian province, and the returnees, with their Persian connections in Babylon, secured positions of authority. Though they represented the descendants of the old "Yahweh-alone" movement, the religion they came to institute was significantly different from monarchic Yahwism. Differences included new concepts of priesthood; a new focus on written law and thus on scripture; and a concern with preserving purity by prohibiting intermarriage outside the community of this new "Israel". This new faith later evolved into Second Temple Judaism. The competing religion of Samaritanism also emerged from the "Yahweh-alone" movement.

Yonatan Adler has argued that Yahwism very likely remained the main religion in Persian-era Yehud and Ptolemaic-era Judea, with Judaism as a distinct religion only arising in the Hasmonean period (2nd–1st centuries BCE).

== Beliefs and practices ==
=== Pantheon ===
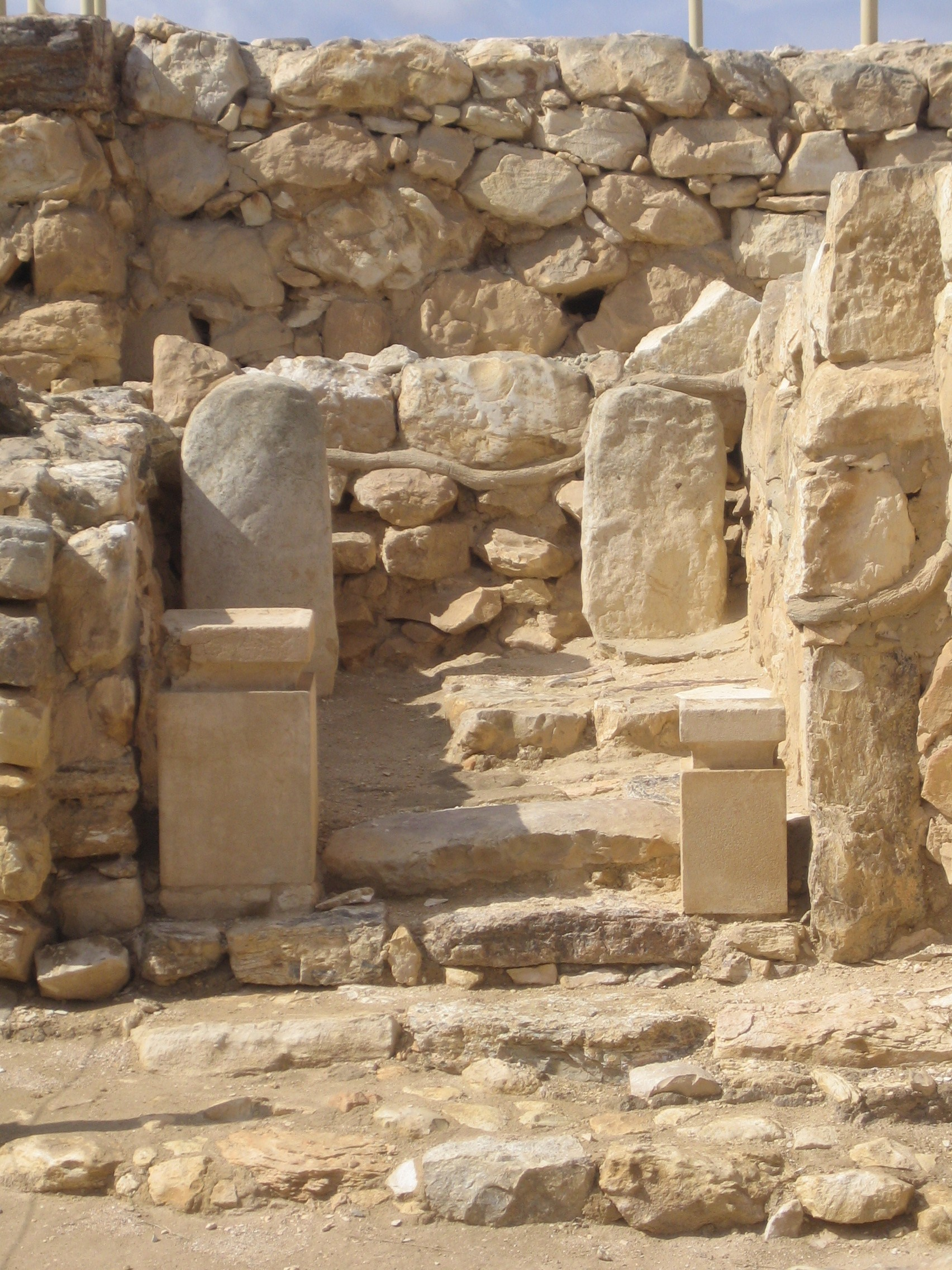
The Holy of Holies in a ruined temple at Tel Arad, with two incense pillars and two stele, one to Yahweh, and one most likely to Asherah. The temple was destroyed or abandoned during the late Iron Age.

A common view among modern scholars is that the majority of ancient Israelites before the exile were polytheistic although some scholars would argue that sole worship of Yahweh as the only true god was widespread.

According to Mark S. Smith, Israel's supreme god was first El by dint of it being the original one, which was by Yahweh, whose name appears as an element on personal seals from the late 9th to the 6th centuries BCE. Alongside El, then Yahweh, was their consort Asherah (replaced by the goddess "Anat-Yahu" in the temple of the 5th century Jewish settlement Elephantine in Egypt), and various biblical passages indicate that statues of the goddess were kept in Yahweh's temples in Bethel, Jerusalem, and Samaria.

Many scholars argue the Israelites worshipped various gods and goddesses such as Astarte, Baal, Mot, Shamash, and Yarikh, all of whom had their priests and prophets and numbered royalty among their devotees. A goddess called the "Queen of Heaven" was also worshiped: she was probably a fusion of Astarte and the Mesopotamian goddess Ishtar, although the phrase is possibly a title of Asherah.

A third tier may also have existed, made up of specialist deities such as the god of snakebite-cures – his name is unknown, as the biblical text identifies him only as Nehushtan, a pun based on the shape of his representation and the metal of which it was made – and below these again was a fourth and final group of minor divine beings such as the mal'ak, the messengers of the higher gods, who in later times became the angels of Christianity, Judaism and Islam, and other heavenly beings such as cherubim.

Data was found to support scholar speculation of widespread worship of Baal and Yahweh coexistence, especially in the north, from the period of Judges until 722 BCE, though support "severely ruptured" after the efforts of King Ahab and his queen Jezebel to elevate Baal to the status of national god in the 9th century BCE, and afterwards the cult of Baal did continue for some time.

==== Hellenistic worship among exiles ====
In Ptoleomaic Egypt (3rd–1st centuries BCE) and other parts of the Hellenic empire, some self-identified Judeans appear to have adopted Hellenistic religious beliefs. Naming conventions of Ptolemaic Judean exiles in the 3rd century BCE appear to show reverence for Greek gods, including personal names referencing Aphrodite, Apollo, Artemis, Demeter, Zeus, and others. Inscriptions of Judean names, tentatively dated to the 2nd–1st century BCE, also appeared in a temple to the god Pan near Edfu. At Oropos in Greece, an inscription dated to the early 3rd century BCE was found in which a Judean proclaimed a vision from the gods Amphiaraus and Hygieia.

=== Religious practice ===
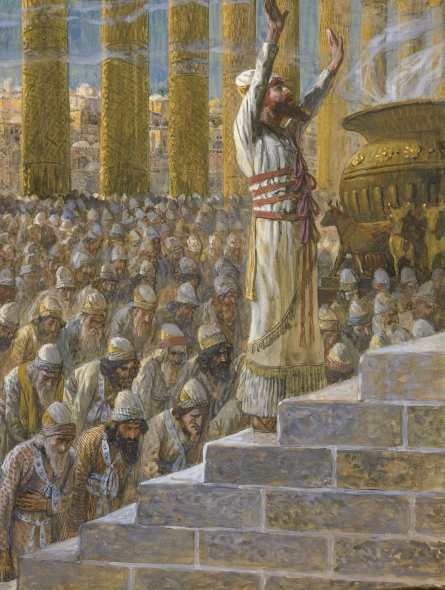
Solomon dedicates the Temple at Jerusalem (painting by James Tissot or follower, c. 1896–1902).

The practices of Yahwism were largely characteristic of other Semitic religions of the time, including festivals, sacrifices, vow-making, private rituals, and the adjudication of legal disputes. The center of Yahweh-worship lay in three great annual festivals coinciding with major events in rural life: Passover with the birthing of lambs, Shavuot with the cereal harvest, and Sukkot with the fruit harvest. They became linked to events in the national mythos of Israel: Passover with the exodus from Egypt, Shavuot with the law-giving at Sinai, and Sukkot with the wilderness wanderings. The festivals thus celebrated Yahweh's salvation of Israel and Israel's status as his holy people, although the earlier agricultural meaning was not entirely lost.

Animal sacrifices played a big role in Yahwism, with the subsequent burning and the sprinkling of their blood, a practice described in the Bible as a daily Temple ritual for the Jewish people. Sacrifice was presumably complemented by the singing or recital of psalms, but the details are scant. The rituals detailed in Leviticus 1–16, with their stress on purity and atonement, were followed only after the Babylonian exile and the Yahwism/Judaism transition. In reality, any head of a family could offer sacrifice as occasion demanded. Prayer itself did not have a statutory role in temple ritual, but was employed on other occasions.

Places of worship referred to as high places (Hebrew: במה bamah and plural במות bamot or bamoth) were found in many towns and villages in ancient Israel as places of sacrifice. From the Hebrew Bible and from existing remains a good idea may be formed of the appearance of such a place of worship. It was often on a hill above the town, as at Ramah (1 Samuel 9:12–14); there was a stele (matzevah), the seat of the deity, and an Asherah pole (named after the goddess Asherah), which marked the place as sacred and was itself an object of worship; there was a stone altar (מִזְבֵּחַ mīzbēaḥ "slaughter place"), often of considerable size and hewn out of the solid rock or built of unhewn stones (Exodus 20:21), on which offerings were burnt; a cistern for water, and perhaps low stone tables for dressing the sacrifices; sometimes also a hall (לִשְׁכָּה līškā) for the sacrificial feasts. Ancient Israelite religion was centered on these sites; at festival seasons, or to make or fulfil a vow, an Israelite might journey to more famous sanctuaries at a distance from home, but ordinarily offerings were made at the bamah of his own town. In Ptolemaic Egypt, Judean exiles established "houses of prayer" (Greek: proseukhai); although scholars have speculated that these sites may have served as temples, the precise function and design of these buildings is not fully known.

Talismans and the mysterious teraphim were also probably used. It is also possible Yahwism employed ecstatic cultic rituals (compare the biblical tale of David dancing naked before the Ark of the Covenant) at times when they became popular, and possibly child sacrifice.

Unlike the Jewish practice of kashrut, according to Adler, no evidence outside the Pentateuch before "the middle of the second century BCE provide[s] ... indications that Judeans might have possessed any restrictions on their diet. For example, archaeologists have discovered catfish bones (a non-kosher fish) in Jerusalem dating to the Persian period, indicating Jerusalemites did not broadly adhere to kashrut restrictions at this time. By contrast, Avraham Faust notes the absence of pig bones indicating an ethnic marker of the Israelites during the Iron Age II (before the 5th century BCE).

== See also ==
- Canaanite religion
- Henotheism
- Jewish views on religious pluralism
- Kenite hypothesis
- Origins of Judaism
- Two House theology
- Elephantine papyri and ostraca
