= Asherah pole =

Canaanite sacred tree or pole honouring goddess

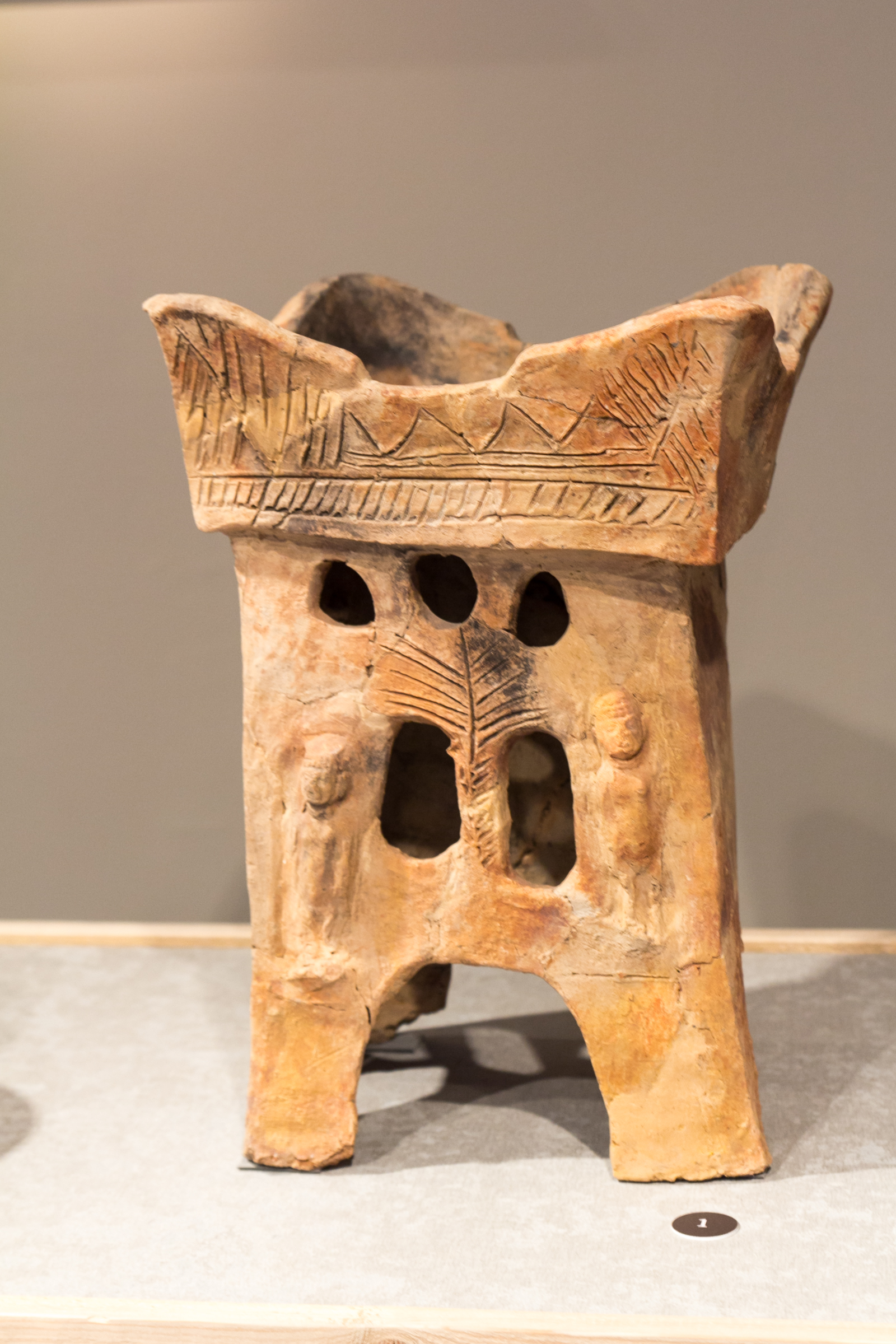
Tel Rehov exhibition at the Eretz Israel Museum, Tel Aviv: a rectangular altar designed in the form of a city gate. A tree incised on the facade and flanked by two female figures is thought to represent Asherah.

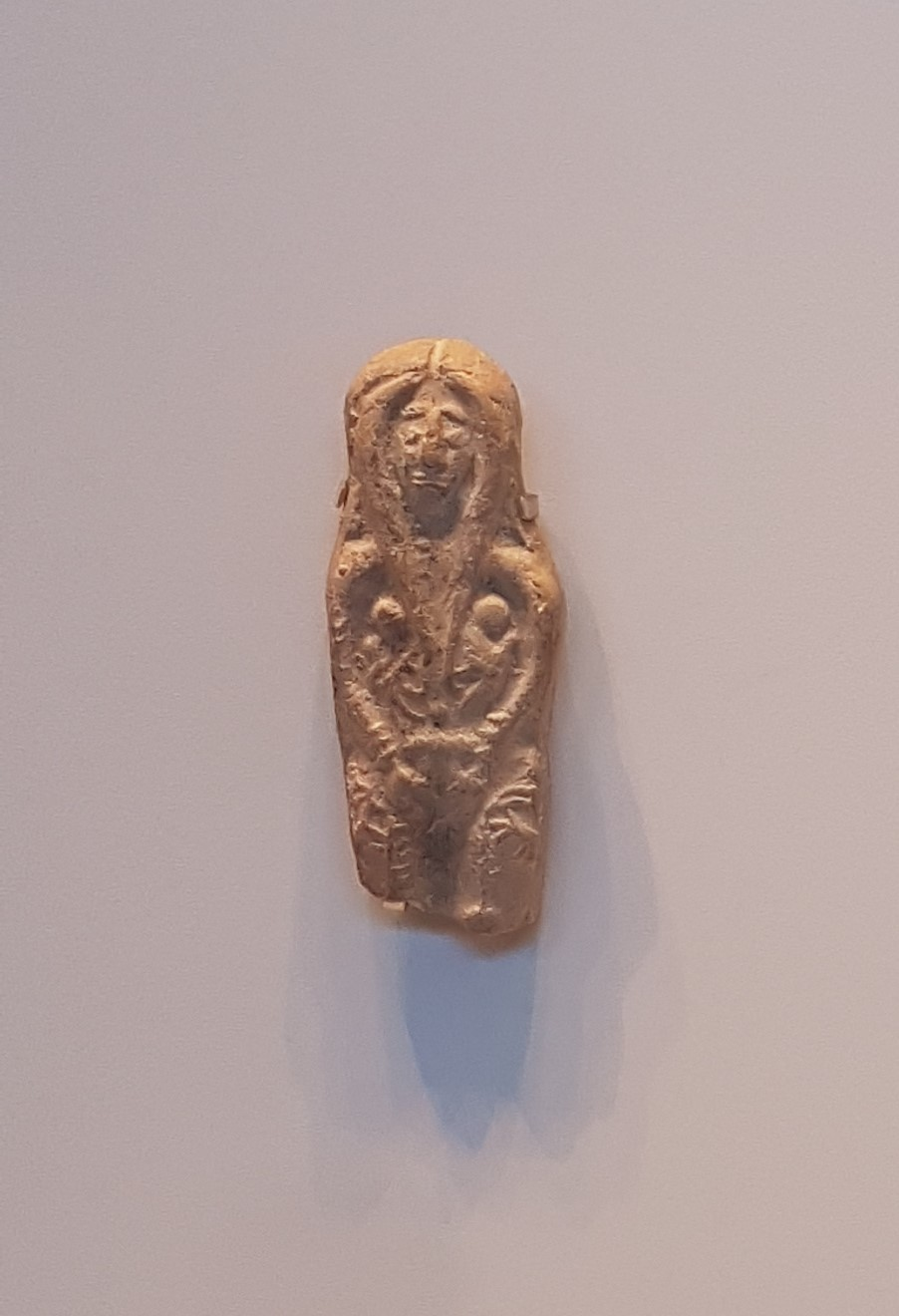
Photograph

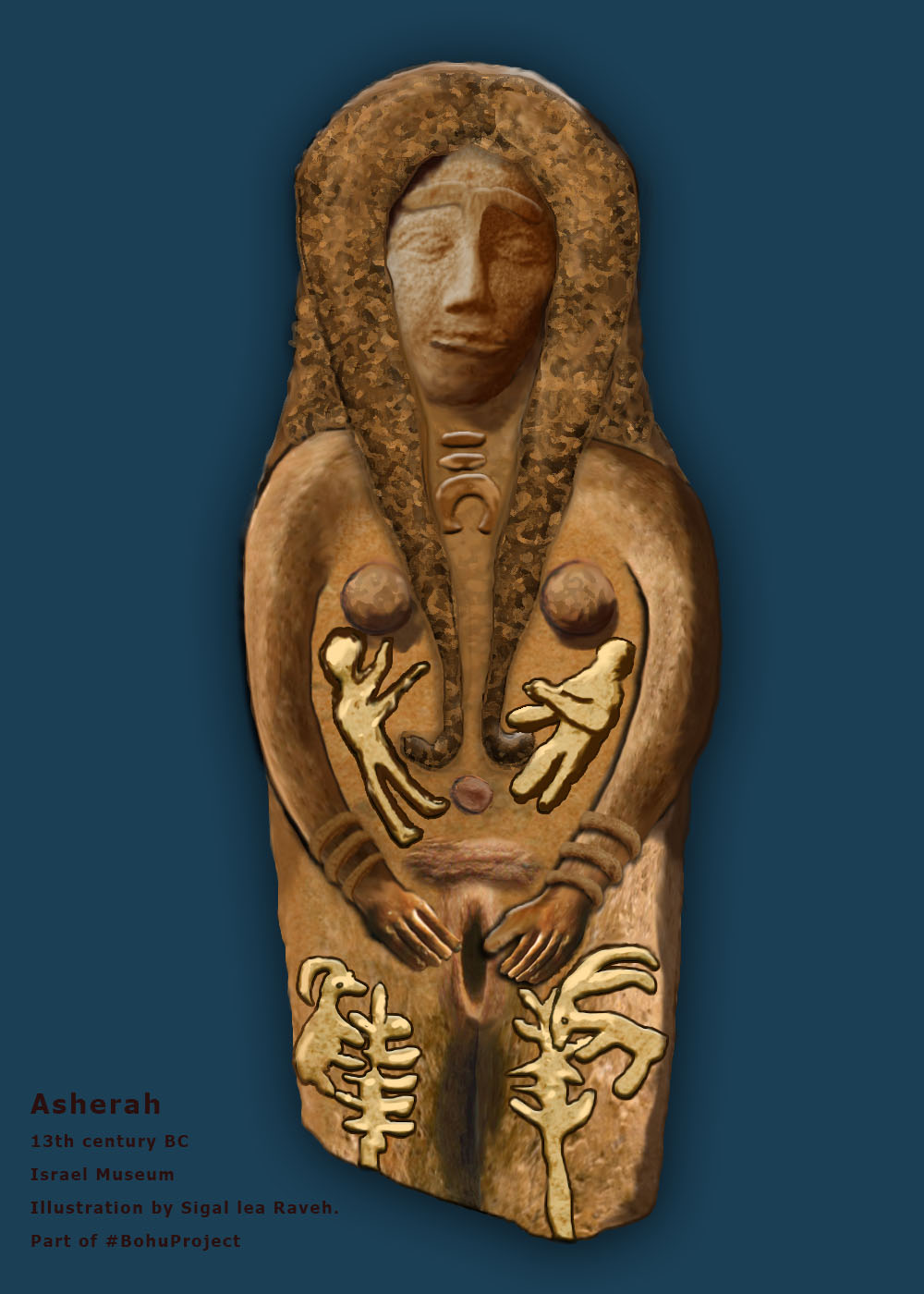
Diagram

13th-century BC statuette depicting the goddess Asherah nursing the twins Shahar and Shalim. Her symbols, the sacred tree and the ibex, appear on her thighs. The figurine may have been held by women in childbirth.

An Asherah pole is a sacred tree or pole that stood near Canaanite religious locations to honor the goddess Asherah. The relation of the literary references to an asherah and archaeological finds of Judaean pillar-figurines has engendered a literature of debate.

The asherim (the Hebrew plural form) were also cult objects related to the worship of Asherah, the consort of either Ba'al or, as inscriptions from Kuntillet ‘Ajrud and Khirbet el-Qom attest, Yahweh, and thus objects of contention among competing cults. Most English translations of the Hebrew Bible translate asherim (Biblical Hebrew: אֲשֵׁרִים, romanized: ăšērim or אֲשֵׁרוֹת ăšēroṯ) to "Asherah poles".

== References from the Hebrew Bible ==
Asherim are mentioned in the Hebrew Bible in the books of Exodus, Deuteronomy, Judges, the Books of Kings, the second Book of Chronicles, and the books of Isaiah, Jeremiah, and Micah. The term often appears as merely אשרה, (Asherah) referred to as "groves" in the King James Version, which follows the Septuagint rendering Koine Greek: ἄλσος, romanized: álsos, pl. ἄλση alsē, and the Vulgate lucus, and "poles" in the New Revised Standard Version; no word that may be translated as "poles" appears in the text. Scholars have indicated that the plural use of the term provides ample evidence that reference is being made to objects of worship rather than a transcendent figure.

The Hebrew Bible suggests that the poles were made of wood. In the sixth chapter of the Book of Judges, God is recorded as instructing the shophet Gideon to cut down an Asherah pole that was next to an altar to Baal. The wood was to be used for a burnt offering.

Deuteronomy 16:21 states that Yahweh hated Asherim: "You shall not set up a sacred post—any kind of pole beside the altar of your God יהוה (the Tetragrammaton) that you may make—or erect a stone pillar; for such your God יהוה detests." That Asherim were not always living trees is shown in 1 Kings 14:23: "They too built for themselves shrines, pillars, and sacred posts on every high hill and under every leafy tree[.]" However, the record indicates that the Israelites often departed from this ideal. For example, King Manasseh of Judah placed an Asherah pole in Solomon's Temple (2 Kings 21:7). King Josiah's reforms in the late 7th century BC included the destruction of many Asherah poles (2 Kings 23:14).

Exodus 34:13 states: "Break down their altars, smash their sacred stones and cut down their Asherim [Asherah poles]."

== Asherah poles in biblical archaeology ==
Biblical archaeologists have suggested that until the 6th century BC the Israelite peoples had household shrines, or at least figurines, of Asherah, which are strikingly common in the archaeological remains.

Joan E. Taylor suggests the temple menorah’s iconography can be traced to representations of a sacred tree, possibly “based on the form of an asherah, perhaps one associated in particular with Bethel.” However, Rachel Hachlili finds this hypothesis unlikely.

Raphael Patai identified the pillar figurines with Asherah in The Hebrew Goddess.

== Purpose ==
So far, the purpose of Asherah poles is unknown.

Due to their role in Iron Age Yahwism, some suggest they were embodiments of Yahweh himself. Evidence for this includes pro-Yahwist kings like Jehu not destroying Asherah poles, despite violently suppressing non-Yahwist cults. In addition, the Yahwist inscription of Kuntillet ʿAjrud in the Sinai Peninsula pairs Yahweh with Asherah. Scholars believe Asherah is merely a cultic object or temple, but others argue that it is a generic name for any consort of Yahweh.

Ronald Hendel argues a middle ground is possible, where the Asherah pole is a symbol of the eponymous goddess, but is believed to be the mediator between the worshipper and Yahweh, where she becomes the "effective bestower of blessing".

Stéphanie Anthonioz says that early references to Asherah poles in the Hebrew Bible (i.e. Deuteronomy 16:21–22) were built on the awareness that Yahweh had a consort, from the perspective of many Israelites. With the exception of Deuteronomists, many Near Easterners believed symbols and cult images, like the Asherah pole, were reflections of the divine and the divine themselves in their anthropomorphized forms.

== Origin ==
Agrarian and hunter-gatherer societies had a need to keep track of the seasons for survival purposes, to predict when to move, or plant and harvest. The earliest systems for tracking seasonal change was a simple pole or tall, narrow rock installed at the highest open hill or open plain, with a semi-circle of similar poles or stones to track the shadow of the sun throughout the year to determine solar solstices. These structures eventually took on additional meanings and became places of social gatherings and events, to include religious worship and sacrifice throughout the millennia. In some locales this led to what became later known as Asherah.

== See also ==
- Baetyl, type of sacred standing stone
- High place, raised place of worship
- Ceremonial pole
- Sacred trees and groves in Germanic paganism and mythology
- Matzevah, sacred pillar (Hebrew Bible) or Jewish headstone
- Kanrodai, sacred pillar in Japanese religions
- Xoanon
- Menhir, orthostat, or standing stone: upright stone, typically from the Bronze Age
- Stele, stone or wooden slab erected as a monument
- Trees in mythology
- Maqam
- Boaz and Jachin
- Judean pillar figures

== Sources ==
- Day, John (September 1986). "Asherah in the Hebrew Bible and Northwest Semitic Literature". Journal of Biblical Literature. 105 (3): 385–408. doi:10.2307/3260509. JSTOR 3260509.
