= Qetesh =

Ancient Egyptian goddess

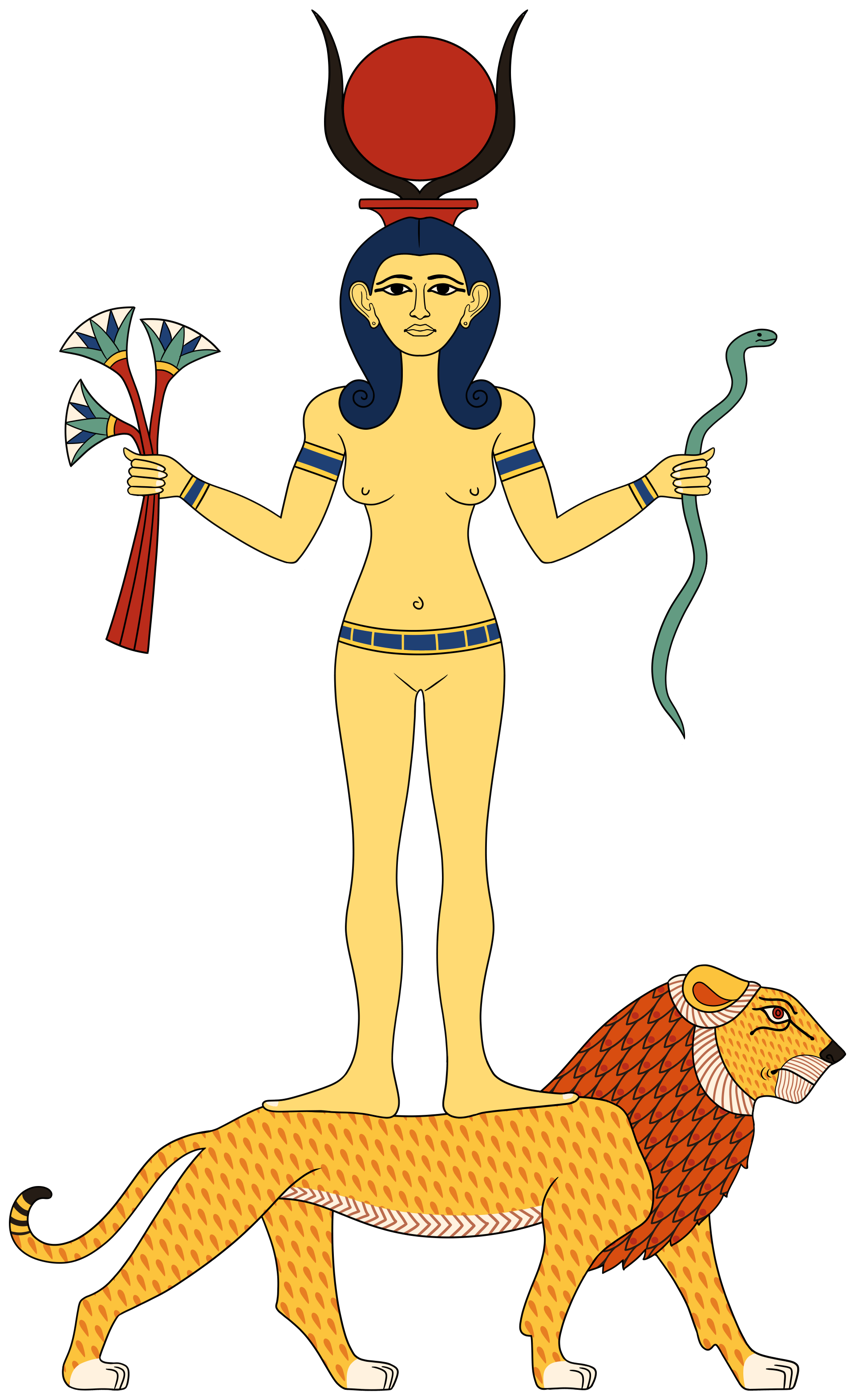
- A digital collage showing an image of Qetesh together with hieroglyphs taken from a separate Egyptian relief (the 'Triple Goddess stone')
Name in hieroglyphs
qd d Aa12 I12
- Symbol: Lion, snake, a bouquet of papyrus or Egyptian lotus, Hathor wig
- Parents: Ptah or Ra

Qetesh (also Qodesh, Qadesh, Qedesh, Qetesh, Kadesh, Kedesh, Kadeš or Qades /ˈkɑːdɛʃ/) was a goddess who was incorporated into the ancient Egyptian religion in the late Bronze Age. The Egyptians likely developed her name based on the Semitic root Q-D-Š, meaning 'holy' or 'blessed,' attested as a title of El and possibly Athirat and a further independent deity in texts from Ugarit.

Due to lack of clear references to Qetesh as a distinct deity in Ugaritic and other Syro-Palestinian sources, she is considered an Egyptian deity influenced by religion and iconography of Canaan by many modern researchers, rather than merely a Canaanite deity adopted by the Egyptians (examples of which include Reshef and Anat).

== Character ==
In Egyptian religion, the functions of Qetesh are hard to determine due to lack of direct references. Still, her epithets (especially the default one, "lady of heaven") might point at an astral character, and a lack of presence in the royal cult might mean that she was regarded as a protective goddess mostly by commoners. In contrast with previous theories and sources, those that are currently known and considered reliable do not associate her with fertility or sex, and those that presented her as a "sacred harlot" are regarded as obsolete in modern scholarship due to lack of evidence.

Her epithets include "Mistress of All the Gods", "Lady of the Stars of Heaven", "Beloved of Ptah", "Great of magic, mistress of the stars", and "Eye of Ra, without her equal". A connection with Ptah or Ra, evident in her epithets, is also known from Egyptian texts about Anat and Astarte.

== Iconography ==
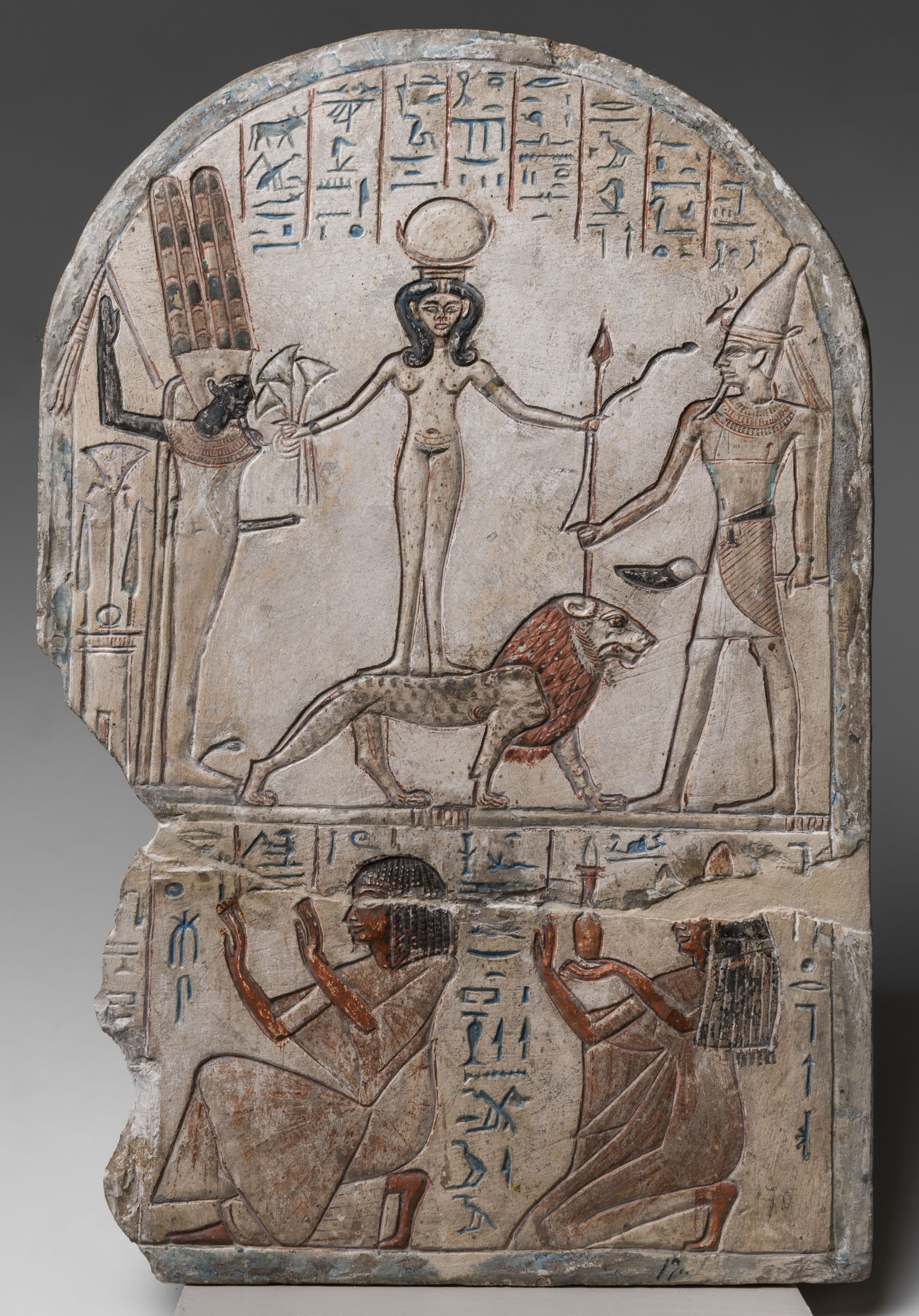
Stele of Qetesh / Kadesh, Dynasty XIX (1292–1186 BC), Museo Egizio

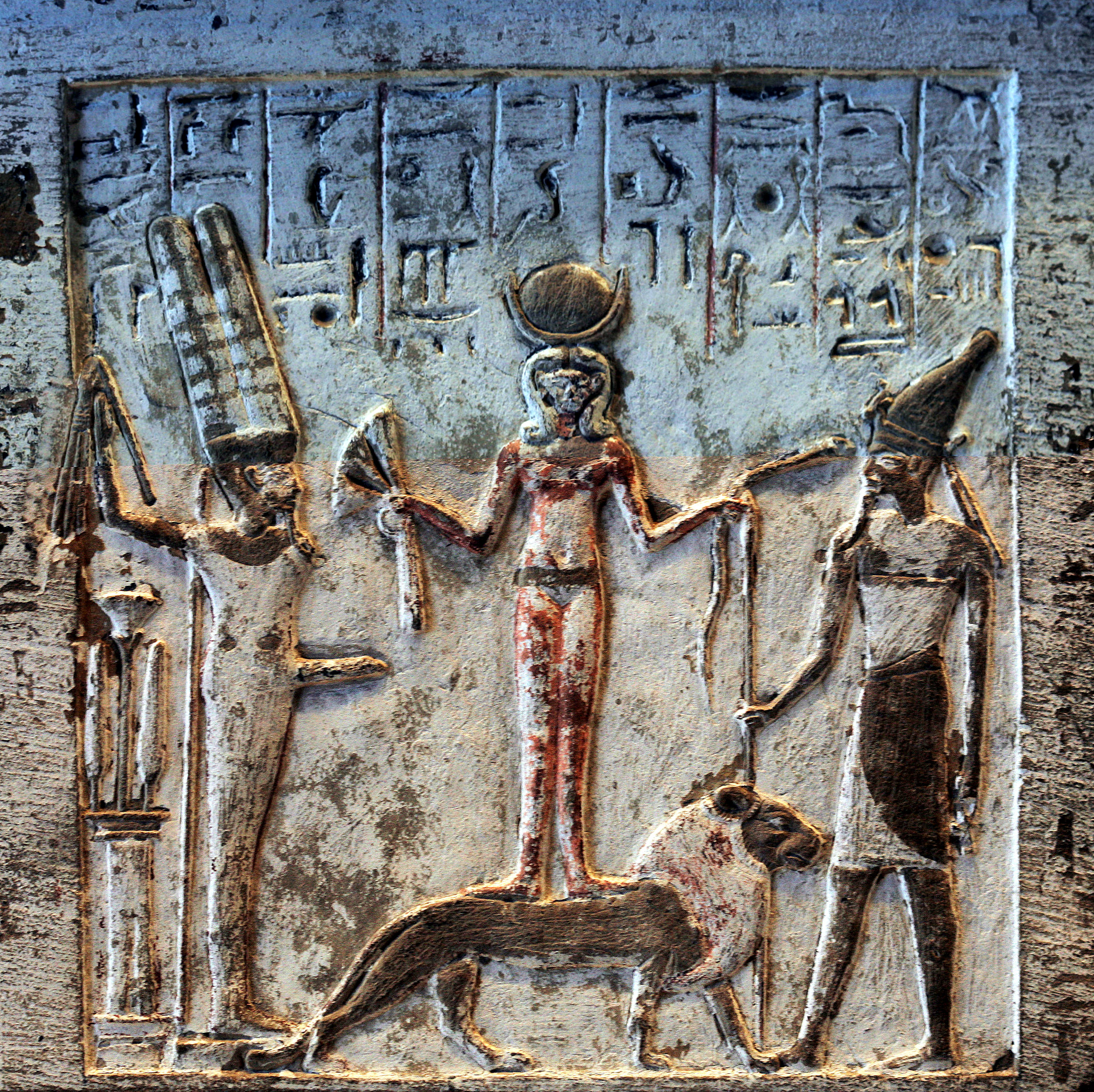
Qetesh wearing the headdress of Hathor and standing on a lion; she holds a lotus flower and a snake and is flanked by Min on the left and Resheph on the right (Louvre).

On a stele representing the deity, Qetesh is depicted as a frontal nude (an uncommon motif in Egyptian art, though not exclusively associated with her), wearing a Hathor wig and standing on a lion, between Min and the Canaanite warrior god Resheph. She holds a snake in one hand and a bouquet of lotus or papyrus flowers in the other.

== Origin ==
Early researchers attempted to prove Qetesh was simply a form of a known Canaanite deity, rather than a fully independent goddess. William F. Albright proposed in 1939 that she was a form of the "lady of Byblos", while René Dussard suggested a connection to "Asherat" (e.g., the biblical Asherah) in 1941. Subsequent studies tried to find further evidence for the equivalence of Qetesh and Asherah, despite their dissimilar functions and symbols.

The arguments presenting Qetesh and Asherah as the same goddess rely on the erroneous notion that Asherah, Astarte, and Anat were the only three prominent goddesses in Canaanite religion and formed a trinity. However, while Ashtart/Astarte and Anat were closely associated with each other in Ugarit, in Egyptian sources, and elsewhere, there is no evidence for conflation of Athirat and Ashtart, nor is Athirat associated closely with Ashtart and Anat in Ugaritic texts.

The concept of Athirat, Anat, and Ashtart as a trinity and the only prominent goddesses in the entire region, popularized by authors like Tikva Frymer-Kensky, is modern. It ignores the significant role of other female deities, such as Shapshu, in known texts, as well as the fact that El appears to be the deity most closely linked to Athirat in primary sources. One of the authors relying on the Anat-Ashtart-Athirat trinity theory is Saul M. Olyan, author of Asherah and the Cult of Yahweh in Israel, who calls the Qudshu-Astarte-Anat plaque "a triple-fusion hypostasis" and considers Qudshu to be an epithet of Athirat by a process of elimination, for Astarte and Anat appear after Qudshu in the inscription.

Modern Egyptologists, such as Christiane Zivie-Coche, do not consider Qetesh to be a hypostasis of Anat or Astarte, but a goddess developed in Egypt, possibly without a clear forerunner among Canaanite or Syrian goddesses, though given a Semitic language name and associated mostly with foreign deities.

== In popular culture ==
Qetesh is the name given to the Goa'uld that once possessed Vala Mal Doran, a recurring and then regular character in Seasons 9 and 10, respectively, of the science fiction television series Stargate SG-1.

Qetesh is also the name used in The Sarah Jane Adventures episode Goodbye, Sarah Jane Smith, and is confirmed to be the humanoid species (also known as "soul-stealers") of Ruby White (the episode's villain), who feeds off excitement and heightened emotion and has stomachs that live outside their bodies.

== See also ==
- Queen of Heaven
- Shala, a Mesopotamian goddess also depicted as nude and associated with the sky
