= Gebirah =

Biblical title given to a queen mother

In the Hebrew Bible, Gebirah (/ɡəbɪərˈɑː/ gə-beer-Ah; Hebrew: גְּבִירָה, romanized: gəḇirā, lit. 'lady') is a title ascribed to queen mothers of Israel and Judah.

== Description ==
The title means "[Great] Lady," with the word being the feminine counterpart to gəḇir (גְּבִיר "virile man, lord, hero"). However, given that this title is most often attributed to a queen mother, the two have become synonymous and therefore gəḇirā is most often translated as such. When romanised, "gebirah" can be used as both a common noun ("a gebirah", "the gebirah") or a proper noun ("the Gebirah"), as with most royal titles. Although not present in the Masoretic Text, the plural form gəḇiroṯ (גְּבִירוֹת) is commonly used by academics to avoid the intra-word switching of "gebirahs".

Some scholars believe the gebirah held great power as counsel of the king. In 1 Kings 2:20, Solomon said to his mother Bathsheba, seated on a throne at his right, "Make your request, Mother, for I will not refuse you". Recognition of a queen mother with such privilege gave her the highest position of authority for a woman in Israel or Judah. The only time a woman held any higher office or title was when Athaliah usurped the throne of Judah.

To further complicate matters, the words גְּבֶרֶת gəḇereṯ, גְּבִרְת gəḇirət, and גְבָרֶת gəḇāreṯ, meaning 'lady', 'mistress', or 'queen', occur nine times in the Masoretic Text. In comparison, gəḇirā occurs only six times. Scholars generally take one of two stances with gəḇereṯ: either classing it as an acceptable variation of the word gəḇirā within the ketiv (featuring a common qere), or opting for a distinct separation of the two words, despite their converged meanings.

== In Christianity ==
Catholic author William G. Most sees the gebirah as a type of the Blessed Virgin Mary. The concept is cited in the Catholic Church as scriptural basis for her title "Queen of Heaven" (Ecclesiastical Latin: Regina Cæli), stemming from her other title Mother of God and subordinate to Jesus’ own position as Christ the King.

== See also ==
- Asherah
- Queen of Heaven
- Queen of heaven (antiquity)
- Queen mother
- Rulers of Israel and Judah
- Tawananna
