= High place =

1st-millennium BCE Canaanite shrine

High places (Hebrew: במות, romanized: bamoṯ, singular במה bamā) are simple hilltop installations with instruments of religion: platforms, altars, standing stones, and cairns are common. Along with open courtyard shrines and sacred trees or groves, they were some of the most often-seen public places of piety in the ancient Near East. They appear in the early Bronze Age at the latest, however they were suppressed and in many cases destroyed as part of centralization of the cult.

== Hebrew Bible ==
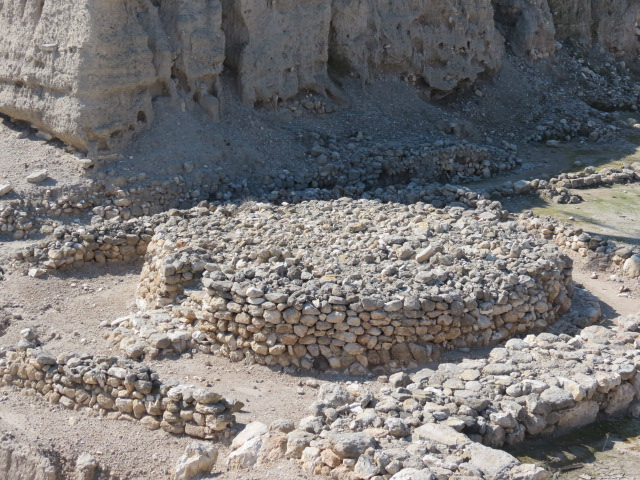
The bamah of Megiddo

From the Hebrew Bible and from existing remains a good idea may be formed of the appearance of such a place of worship. It was often on the hill above the town, as at Ramah (1 Samuel 9:12–14); there was a stele (matzevah), the seat of the deity, and a Asherah pole (named after the goddess Asherah), which marked the place as sacred and was itself an object of worship; there was a stone altar (מִזְבֵּחַ mizbeḥ "slaughter place"), often of considerable size and hewn out of the solid rock or built of unhewn stones (Exodus 20:21), on which offerings were burnt; a cistern for water, and perhaps low stone tables for dressing the victims; sometimes also a hall (לִשְׁכָּה lishkah) for the sacrificial feasts.

Ancient Israelite religion was centred on these sites; at festival seasons, or to make or fulfil a vow, an Israelite might journey to more famous sanctuaries at a distance from home, but ordinarily offerings were made at the bamah of his own town. The building of the Temple at Jerusalem, which under the Law of Moses had an exclusive right to offer sacrifices (Deuteronomy 12), did not stop the bamot sacrifices until Kings Hezekiah and Josiah proscribed them.

According to the Encyclopædia Britannica Eleventh Edition, it was believed at the time (1911) that the development of the religious significance of the word took place not in Land of Israel but among the Canaanites, from whom the Israelites, in taking possession of the holy places of the land, also adopted the name. The Hebrew Bible claims that the Canaanites and Israelites were entirely distinct peoples, that their ancestor Abraham hailed from Ur rather than from Canaan, and that the Israelites migrated to the land inhabited by native Canaanites and conquered it by force. The prevailing academic opinion today is that the Israelites were a mixture of peoples predominantly indigenous to Canaan, although an Egyptian matrix of peoples may also have played a role in their ethnogenesis (giving birth to the saga of The Exodus), with an ethnic composition similar to that in Ammon, Edom and Moab, and including Habiru and Shasu.

The culture of ancient Israelite sites was extremely similar to that of other Canaanite sites, with the most significant difference being the worship of Yahweh, so in spite of late Biblical references to Ur, it is probable that the Israelite federation evolved in situ in Canaan, rather than by conquest of a foreign nation, and inherited the cultural concept of high places from indigenous ancestors. While Canaanites associated high places with ʼĒl, early Israelites used them for worship of Yahweh in an equivalent sense due to the conflation of Yahweh with ʼĒl. This can be seen in the frequent Biblical references to Yahweh with terms such as El, El Shaddai, Elohim, and Elyon, instead of YHWH, which was considered too holy to speak aloud. These El-based terms are likely derived from the original personal name of ʼĒl and from ancient Canaanite titles meaning "son of God," "angel of God," or "God most high." Consequently, high places can be seen as an indigenous development of both the Israelites and the Canaanites, but by the time of the composition of the Hebrew Bible's oldest texts, high places were considered avodh zereh, foreign worship associated with the Canaanite pantheon.

The prophets of the 8th century BCE assail the popular religion as corrupt and licentious and as fostering the monstrous delusion that immoral men can buy the favour of God by worship, but they make no distinction in this respect between the high places of Israel and the temple in Jerusalem. (cf. Amos 5:21 sqq.; Hosea 4:1–19; Isaiah to sqq.) Hosea stigmatizes the whole cultus as pure heathenism—Canaanite Baal-worship adopted by apostate Israel. The fundamental law in Deuteronomy 12:1–32 prohibits sacrifice at every place except the temple in Jerusalem; in accordance with this law Josiah, in 621 BCE, destroyed and desecrated the altars (bamoth) throughout his kingdom (where Yahweh had been worshipped since times before a permanent singular Temple at Jerusalem was erected) and forcibly removed their priests to Jerusalem, where they occupied an inferior rank in the temple ministry.

In the prophets of the 7th and 6th centuries BCE, the word bamot connotes "seat of heathenish or idolatrous worship"; and the historians of the period apply the term in this opprobrious sense not only to places sacred to other gods but to the old holy places of Yahweh in the cities and villages of Judah, which, in their view, had been illegitimate since the building of Solomon's Temple, and therefore not valid centers for the worship of Yahweh; even the most pious kings of Judah are censured in the Books of Kings for tolerating their existence. The reaction that followed the death of Josiah (608 BCE) restored the old altars of Yahweh; they survived the destruction of the temple in 586 BCE, and it is probable that after its restoration (520–516 BCE) they only slowly disappeared, in consequence partly of the natural predominance of Jerusalem in the little territory of Judaea, partly of the gradual establishment of the supremacy of the written law over custom and tradition in the Persian period.

The rule of the Law of Moses that sacrifice can be offered to Yahweh only at the Temple in Jerusalem was never fully established in fact. The Jewish military colonists in Elephantine in the 5th century BCE had their altar of Yahweh beside the highway; the Jews in Egypt in the Ptolemaic period had, besides many local sanctuaries, one greater temple at Leontopolis, with a priesthood whose claim to "valid orders" was much better than that of the High Priests in Jerusalem, and the legitimacy of whose worship is admitted even by the Palestinian rabbis.

== Gallery ==
R A Stewart Macalister in Gezer.

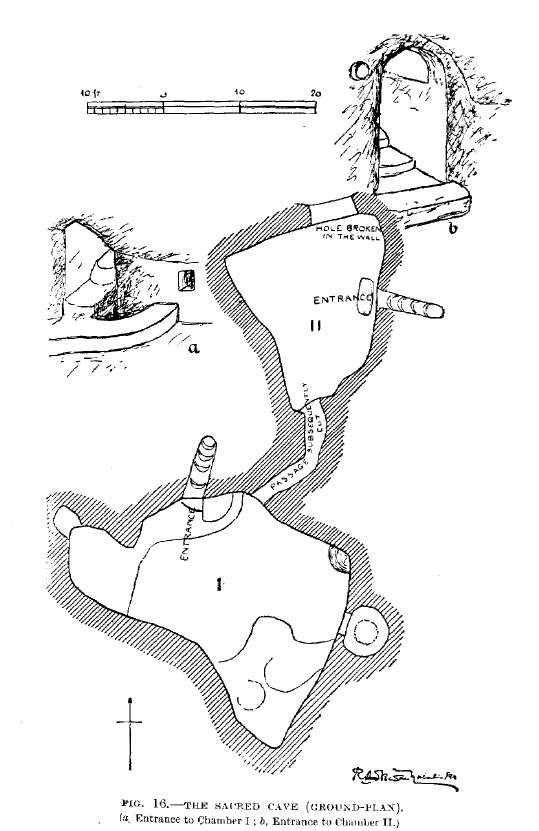

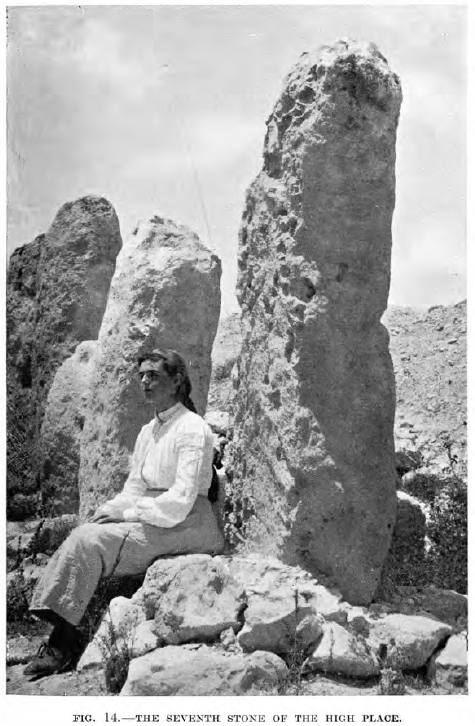

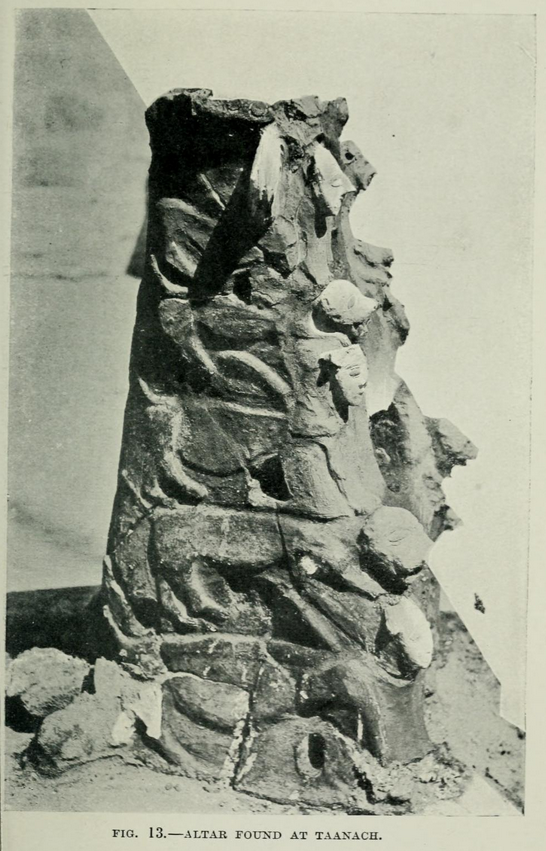

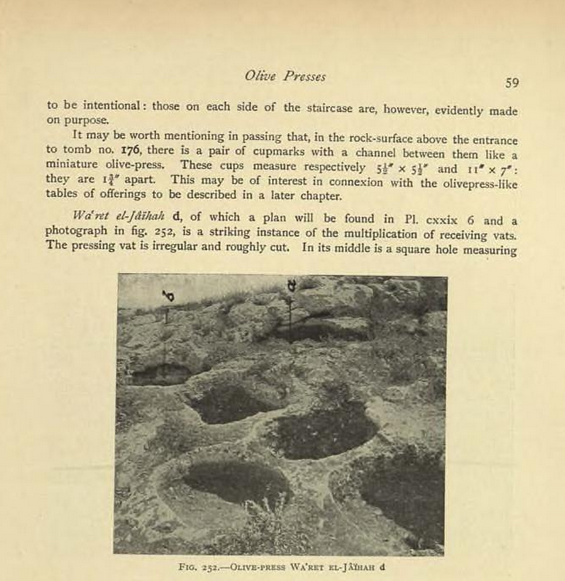

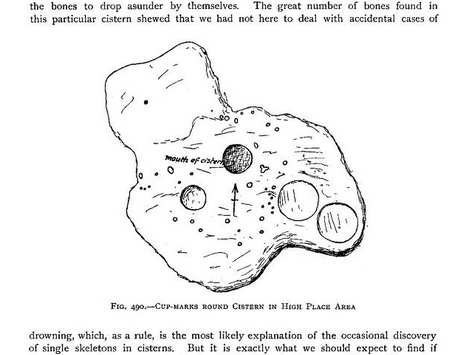

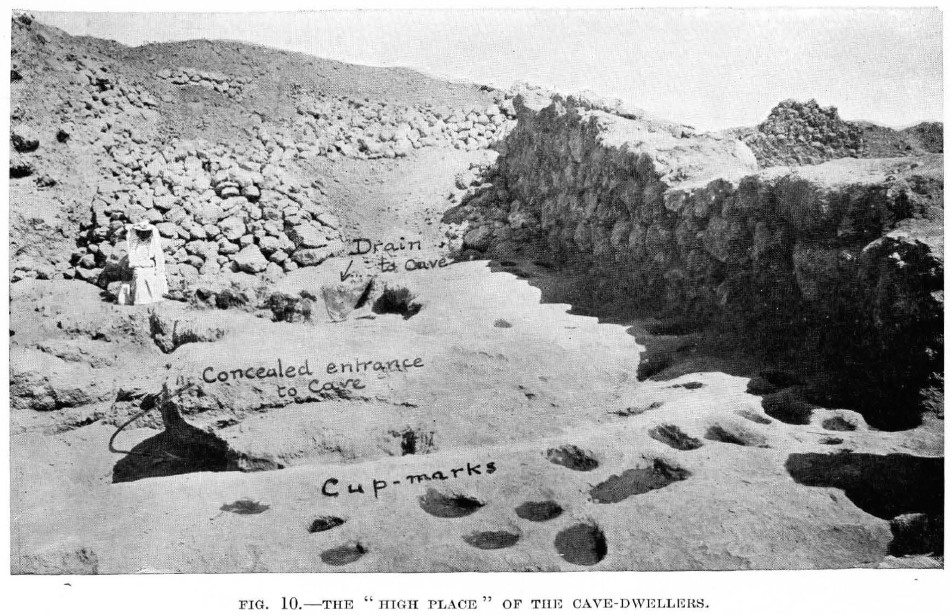

== Modern Judaism ==
In Jewish synagogues, the "High Place" (bimah; see also bema) is the elevated platform from which the Torah is read. It traditionally had its origin from the platform erected in the Temple in Jerusalem at which the king would read the Torah during the Hakhel ceremony every seven years at the Feast of Tabernacles (Deuteronomy 31:10–13). The bimah is located in the center of Orthodox synagogues, and in the front of Reform and Conservative synagogues.

The word bimah is almost certainly derived from the Ancient Greek word for a raised platform, bema (βῆμα), with the resemblance to the Biblical word bamah being coincidental.

== Eastern Orthodoxy and Eastern Catholicism ==
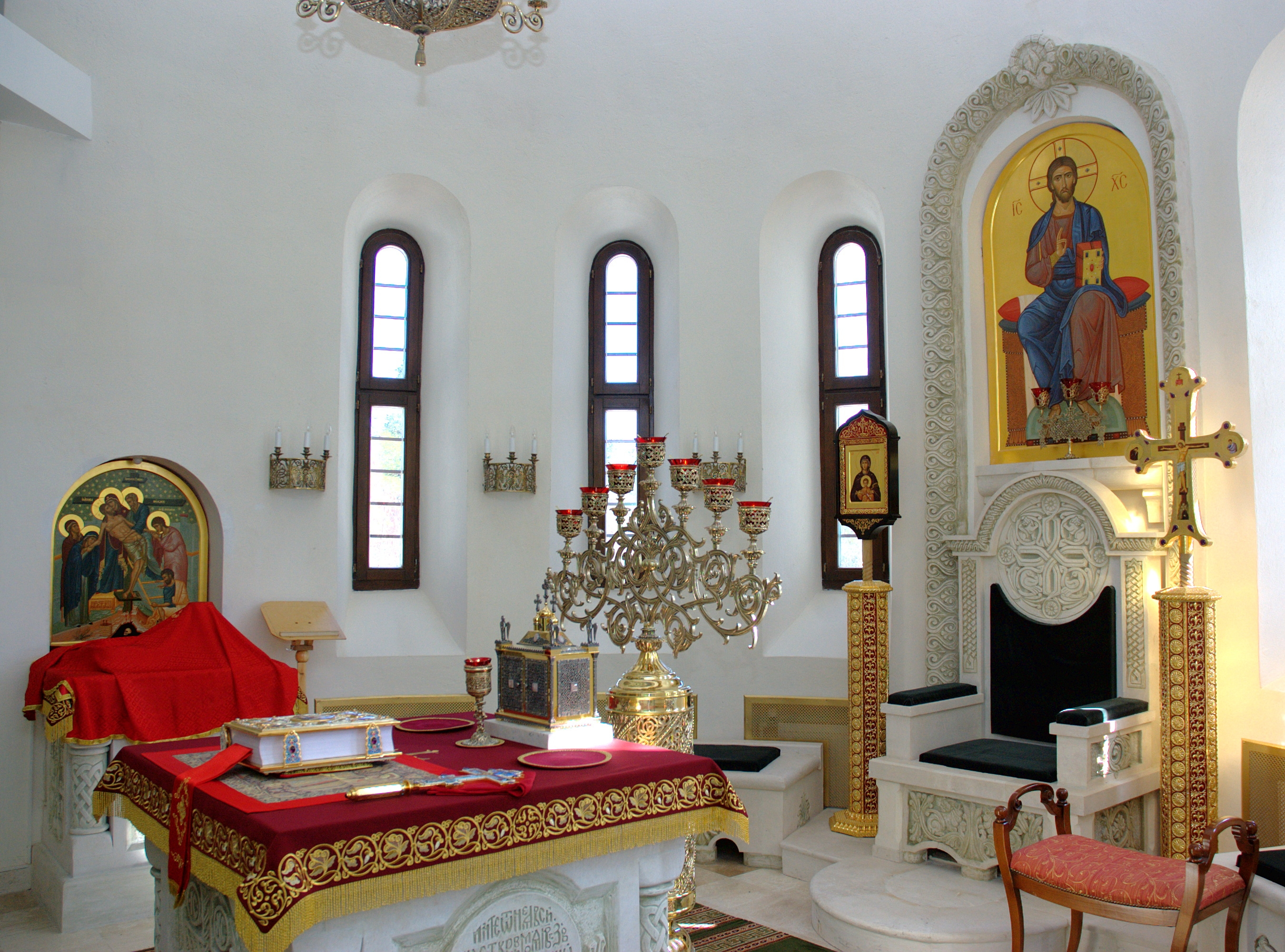
The Holy Place (Sanctuary) in the church of the Saint Vladimir Skete Valaam monastery. To the left is the Holy Table (altar) with the Gospel Book on the High Place. To the right is the Cathedra (Bishop's Throne).

In the Eastern Orthodox Church and Eastern Catholic Churches the High Place is the name used for the location of the cathedra (episcopal throne), set in the center of the apse of a church's sanctuary, behind the Holy Table (altar). In larger churches there may be a literal elevation, but there is often not room for this in smaller churches. The cathedra is surrounded on both sides by the synthronos, a set of other seats or benches for the use of the priests. Every Orthodox church and Eastern Catholic church has such a High Place even if it is not a cathedral.

The term High Place also refers to the central portion of the Holy Table, where the antimension and Gospel Book are normally kept. The only other objects that are permitted to occupy this place on the altar are the chalice and discos (paten) for the celebration of the Divine Liturgy. On the various Feasts of the Cross, a tray covered by an aër (liturgical veil) holding a Cross and branches of basil is placed on the High Place of the Holy Table until it is taken in procession to the center of the nave. On Good Friday, the Epitaphion is set on the Holy Table until it is taken to the "tomb" in the center of the nave for veneration by the faithful. During the Paschal Vigil, this Epitaphion is taken through the Holy Doors and placed again on the High Place of the Holy Table, where it will remain until the Ascension.

== See also ==
- Bema and bimah, elevated platform
- Minoan peak sanctuaries
- Heiau, Hawaiian temples
- Marae, Polynesian sacred spaces
