= The Hebrew Goddess =

1967 book by Raphael Patai

- Title page for The Hebrew Goddess (1967)
- Author: Raphael Patai
- Language: English
- Genre: Non-fiction
- Publisher: Wayne State University Press
- Publication date: 1967
- ISBN: 0-8143-2271-9

The Hebrew Goddess is a 1967 book by Jewish historian and anthropologist Raphael Patai, in which the author argues that historically, the Jewish religion had elements of polytheism, especially the worship of goddesses and a cult of the mother goddess.

== Earlier themes ==
Raphael Patai's first exploration of this theme was in his 1947 book, Man and Temple in Ancient Jewish Myth and Ritual (New York: Nelson), where he cites textual evidence that was not repeated in his later works.

== Thesis ==
The Hebrew Goddess supports the theory through the interpretation of archaeological and textual sources as evidence for veneration of feminine beings. Hebrew goddesses identified in the book include Asherah, Anath, Astarte, Ashima, the cherubim in Solomon's Temple, the Matronit (Shekhina), and the personified "Shabbat Bride".

The later editions of the book were expanded to include recent archaeological discoveries and the rituals of unification (Yichudim), which are to unite God with his Shekinah.

The identification of the pillar figurines with Asherah in this book was the first time they had been identified as such.

== Reception ==
A review of the third edition was published in Comparative Civilizations Review.

While considered groundbreaking during publication, Patai's identification of the Burney Relief as a depiction of Lilith is considered dated. Patai's assertions can be traced back to the scholarship of Henry Frankfort (1936), who, in turn, cites Emil Kraeling, which has since been debunked by the scholarship of Cyril J. Gadd.

== Editions ==
- Patai, Raphael (1967). The Hebrew Goddess. Wayne State University Press. ISBN 0-8143-2271-9.

A third, enlarged edition, was published in 1990 by Wayne State University Press.
