= Asherah =

Ancient Semitic goddess

- Lady Asherah (of the) Sea or Day
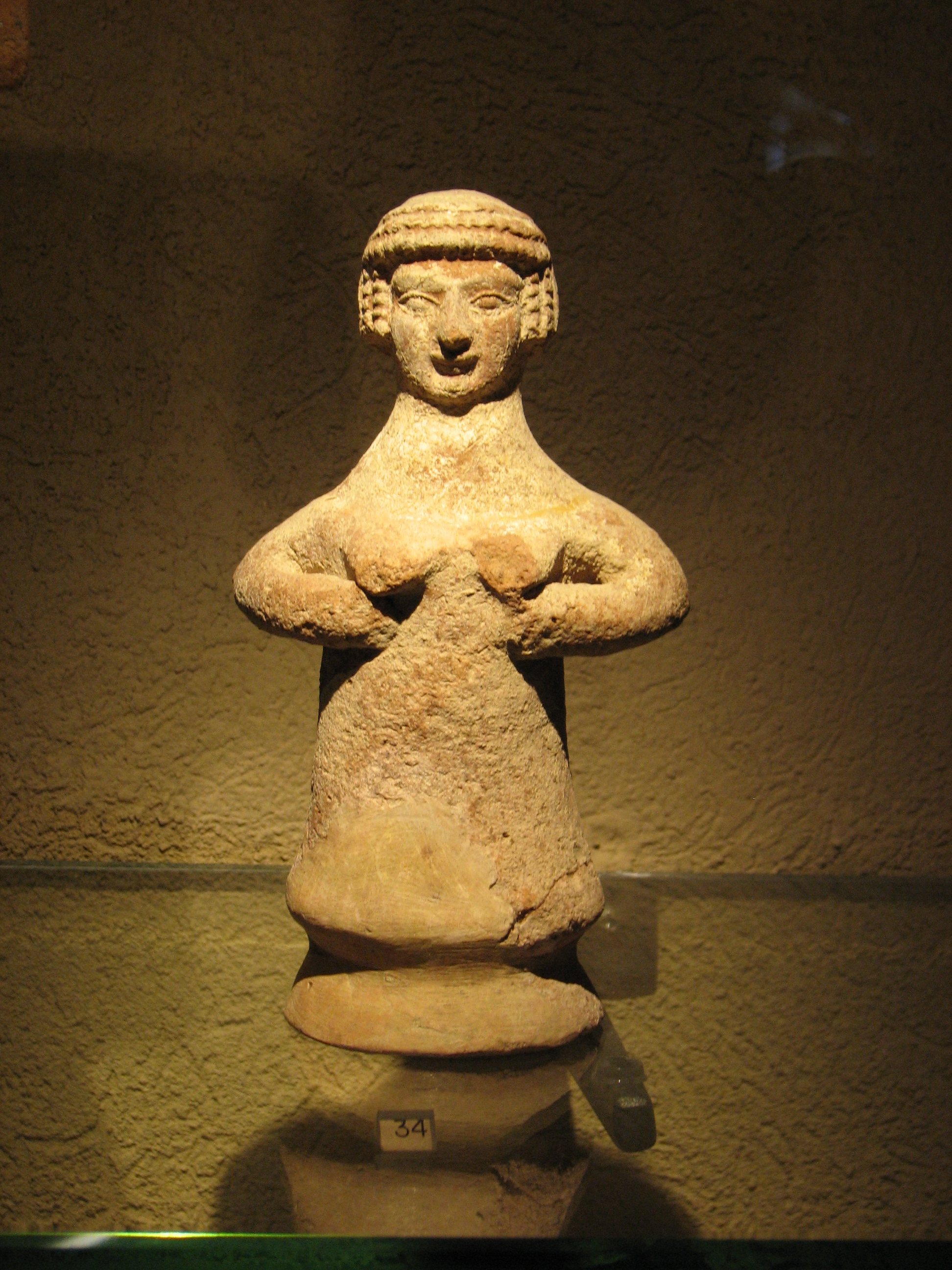
- Late Iron Age Figurine of Asherah, Hecht Museum, Israel
- Other names: Athirat, Rabat Athirat Yam
- Venerated in: Ancient Semitic religion
- Major cult center: Levant (particularly Canaan, Phoenicia, and Ugarit)
- Abode: Sea
- Symbol: Asherah pole, tree, sacred grove, lioness, snake

Genealogy
- Consort: El (Ugaritic religion); Amurru (Amorite religion); Elkunirsa (Hittite religion); Yahweh? (Israelite religion); Wadd? (Minaean religion); 'Amm? (Qatabanian religion)
- Children: 70 sons (Ugaritic religion); 77 or 88 sons (Hittite religion)

Asherah (/ˈæʃərə/; Hebrew: אֲשֵׁרָה, romanized: ʾĂšērā; Ugaritic: 𐎀𐎘𐎗𐎚, romanized: ʾAṯiratu; Akkadian: 𒀀𒅆𒋥, romanized: Aširat; Qatabanian: 𐩱𐩻𐩧𐩩, romanized: ʾṯrt) was a goddess in ancient Semitic religions. She also appears in Hittite writings as Ašerdu(š) or Ašertu(š) (Hittite: 𒀀𒊺𒅕𒌈, romanized: a-še-er-tu_{4}), and as Athirat in Ugarit as the consort of ʾEl. Asherah was a major goddess in ancient Northwest Semitic cultures, often associated with fertility, motherhood, and sacred trees. Asherah was the goddess of the sea while "her husband El" was the god of 'heaven.'

Asherah was sometimes called Elat, the feminine equivalent of El, and held titles such as "holy" (qdš), "lady" (rbt), or "progenitress of the gods" (qnyt ỉlm). Asherah's iconography frequently depicted her with pronounced sexual features, often combined with tree motifs like date palms, highlighting her role as a fertility goddess. Some artifacts, such as the Revadim Asherah figurines, illustrate her suckling children or displaying sexual imagery, emphasizing her maternal and generative symbolism. Her worship may also be reflected in asherah poles, cultic objects frequently mentioned in the Hebrew Bible, though scholars debate whether these represent the goddess herself or sacred symbols.

Asherah's influence extended across regions including Israel and Judah, Philistia, Egypt, and Arabia, appearing under different names and roles. In the ancient Levant, she may have been considered a consort of Yahweh, as suggested by inscriptions at Kuntillet Ajrud and Khirbet el-Qom, though interpretations vary, and some scholars argue these references describe cultic objects rather than the goddess. Similarities with other goddesses, such as Shapshu, Hathor, and Qetesh, suggest her image and attributes influenced surrounding cultures. Asherah was also linked to sacred fertility rites, which may have included women of status in ritual activities, though the association with temple prostitution is now debated. Over time, monotheistic reforms suppressed her worship, and in later texts, references to Asherah were increasingly translated as groves or sacred trees rather than directly as a goddess.

== Name ==
=== Etymology ===
Some have sought a common-noun meaning of her name, especially in Ugaritic appellation rabat athirat yam, only found in the Baal Cycle. But an Ugaritic homophone's meaning does not equate to an etymon, especially if the name is older than Ugaritic. There is no hypothesis for rabat athirat yam without significant issues, and if Asherah were a word from Ugarit, it would be pronounced differently.

The common Northwest Semitic root ʾṯr (cf Arabic: أثر) means "trace, way".

=== Grammar ===
Biblical Hebrew: הָאֲשֵׁרֽוֹת, romanized: ʾAšēroṯ, with the feminine grammatical gender plural form -oṯ, is found three times in the Hebrew Bible: in Judges 3:7 and 2 Chronicles 19:3 and 2 Chronicles 33:3. Archaic suffixes like –atu/a/i became Northwest Semitic -aṯ or -ā, the latter often written -ah in transcription. Terminally alternate spellings like Asherat and Asherah reflect contextual rather than existential variation.

A masculine plural form Asherim appears in Ezekiel 27:6, but refers to boxwood (Buxus sempervirens) as a variant form of תְּאַשּׁוּר təʾaššur "cypress of Lebanon" (Cedrus libani).

=== Title ===
Her name is sometimes 'lt "Elat", the feminine equivalent of El. Her titles often include qdš "holy" and baʽlat, or rbt "lady", and qnyt ỉlm, "progenitress of the gods".

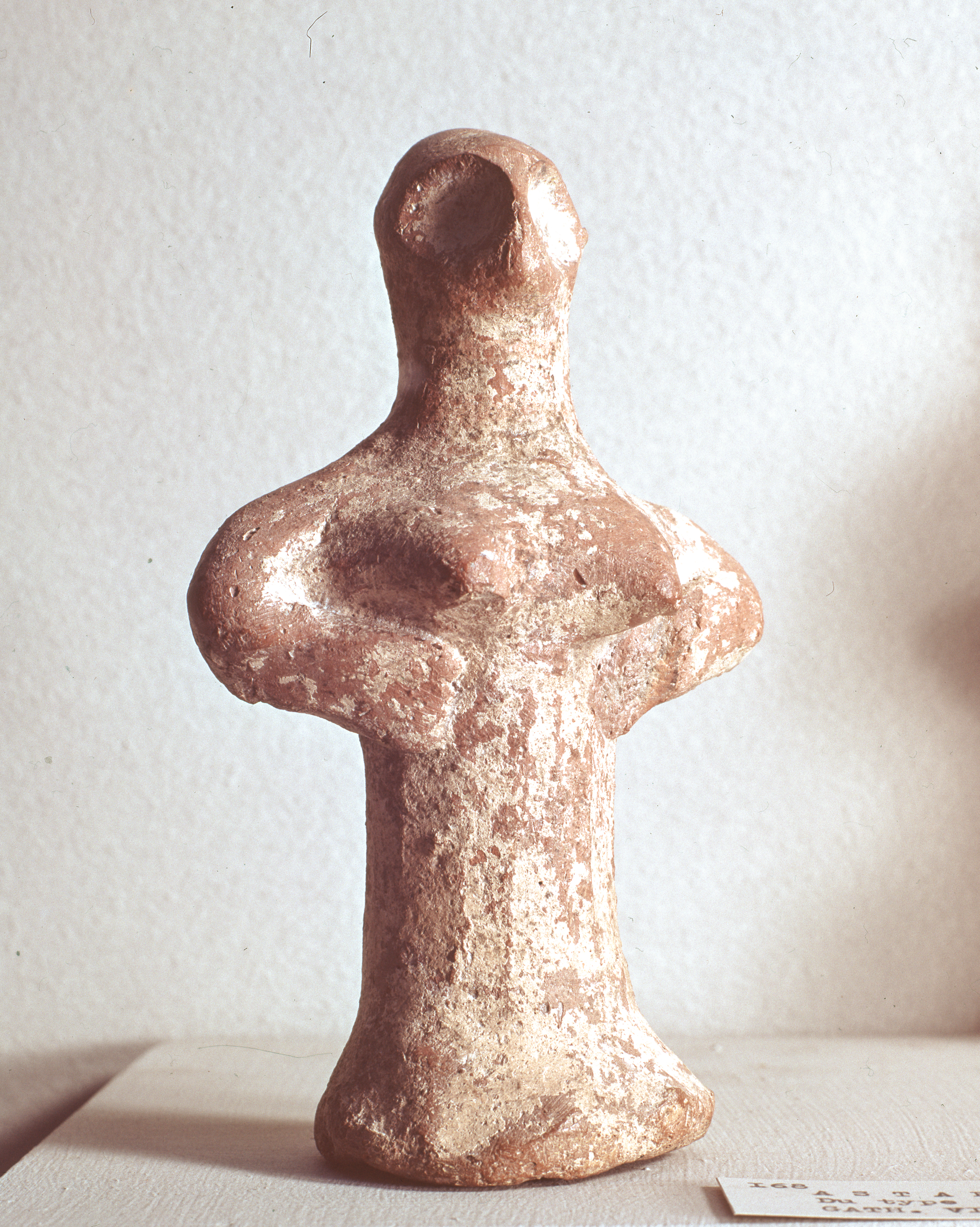
Flat lighting and en face presentation can lessen the visual effect of the Judean pillar figure's directly protruding breasts.

== Interpretation ==
Asherah was a significant divinity in the Northwest Semitic cultures. However, particularly in the Hebrew Bible, asherah came to be identified with cultic wooden objects referred to as asherah poles. In this context, there is controversy about whether inscriptions referring to Asherah indicate the deity, the asherah pole, or both (de Vaux). Winter says the goddess and her symbol should not be distinguished.

Some scholars have proposed an early link between Asherah and Eve based upon the coincidence of their common title as "the mother of all living" in Genesis 3:20 through the identification with Ḫepat of Aleppo. Ḫepat, whose name is Northwest Semitic in origin, was the partner of storm gods in several West Asian cultures speaking unrelated languages, including the West Semitic deity Hadad in Aleppo and Ebla, Teššub in Hurrian religion, and Tarḫunz of the Luwians of Anatolia. Olyan states that the original Hebrew name for Eve, חַוָּה Ḥawwā, is cognate to ḥawwat, an attested epithet of Tanit in the first millennium BCE, (Note: 4 See KAT 89.1, rbt hwt "It, *rabbat hawwat 'ilat, "The Lady Hawwah, Elat,'" who is likely Asherah/Elat/Tannit. Elat is a well-known epithet of Asherah both in the Bronze and Iron Ages. "The Lady" (rbt) is used frequently of Tannit in the Punic world. For another Punic attestation of hwt, see M. Lidzbarski, Ephemeris fuer semitische Epigraphik (GieBen: Topelmann, 1915) 3:285.) though other scholars dispute a connection between Tanit and Asherah and between Asherah and Eve. A Phoenician deity Ḥawwat is attested in the Punic Tabella Defixionis.

There is further speculation that the Shekhinah as a feminine aspect of Yahweh may be a cultural memory or devolution of Asherah. Another such aspect may be seen in the feminine personification of Wisdom in the Book of Proverbs.

== Iconography ==
A variety of symbols have been associated with Asherah. The most common by far is a tree, an equivalence seen as early as the Neolithic.

Cultic objects dedicated to Asherah frequently depict trees, and the terms asherim and asheroth, regularly invoked by the Hebrew Bible in the context of Asherah worship, are traditionally understood to refer to asherah poles. An especially common Asherah tree in visual art is the date palm, a reliable producer of nutrition throughout the year. Some expect living trees, but Olyan sees a stylized, non-living palm or pole. The remains of a juniper discovered in a 7500 year old gravesite in Eilat has been considered an Asherah tree by some.

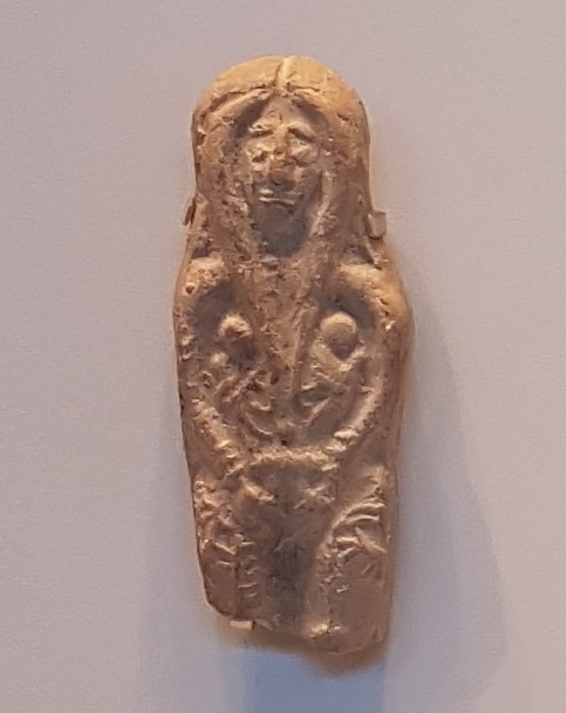
The Revadim Asherah

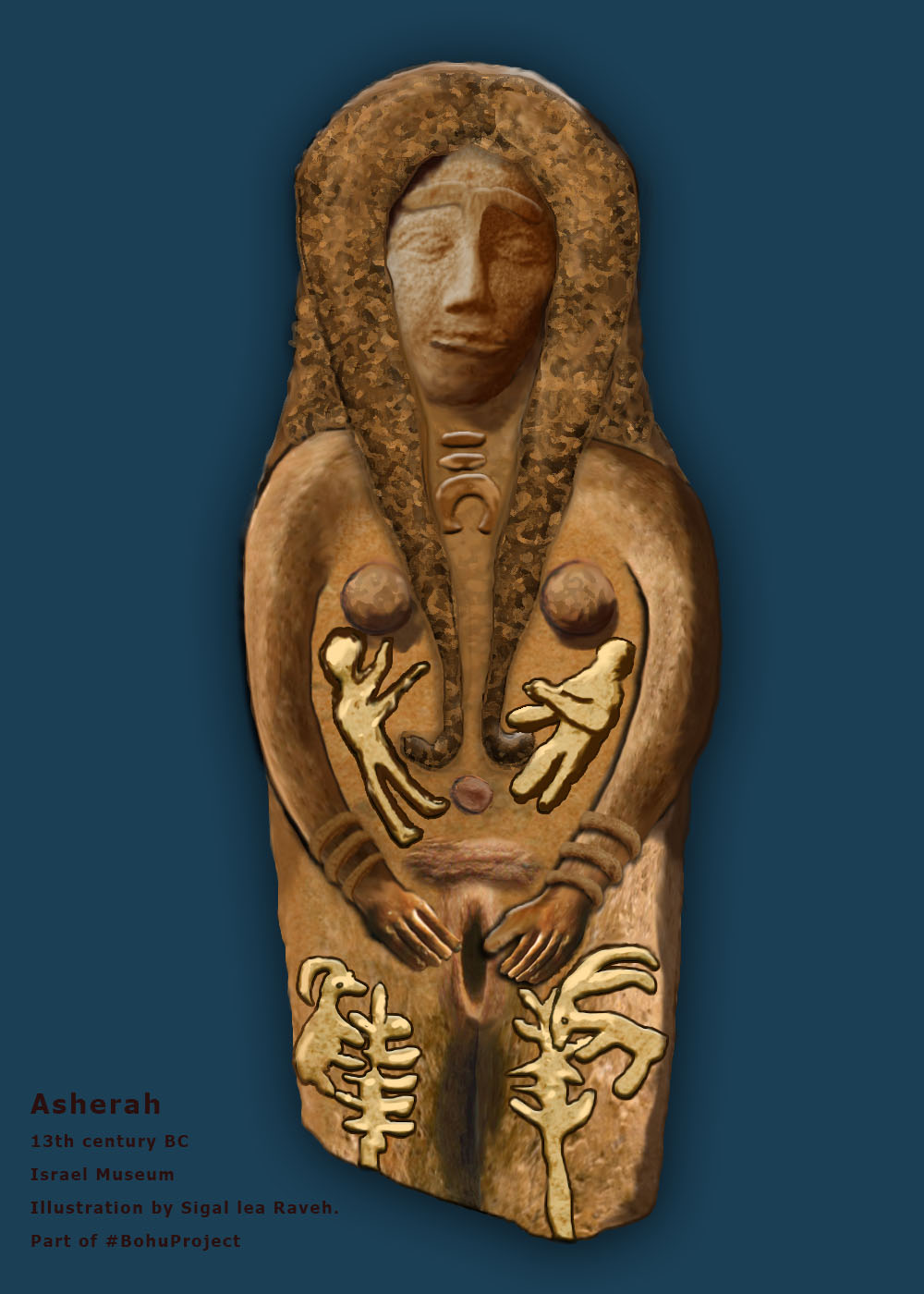
Illustration

Asherah's association with fertility was not limited to her association with trees; she was often depicted with pronounced sexual features. Images of Asherah, often called 'Astarte figurines', are representative of Asherah as a tree in that they have bodies which resemble tree trunks, while also further extenuating the goddess' connection to fertility in line with her status as a "mother goddess". The "Judean pillar figures" universally depict Asherah with protruding breasts. Likewise, the so-called Revadim Asherah displays images of Asherah suckling two smaller human figures, as well as using both of her hands to expose her vagina fully. Many times, Asherah's pubis area was marked by a concentration of dots, indicating pubic hair, though this figure is sometimes polysemically understood as a grape cluster. The womb was also sometimes used as a nutrix symbol, as animals are often shown feeding directly (if abstractly) from the pubic triangle.

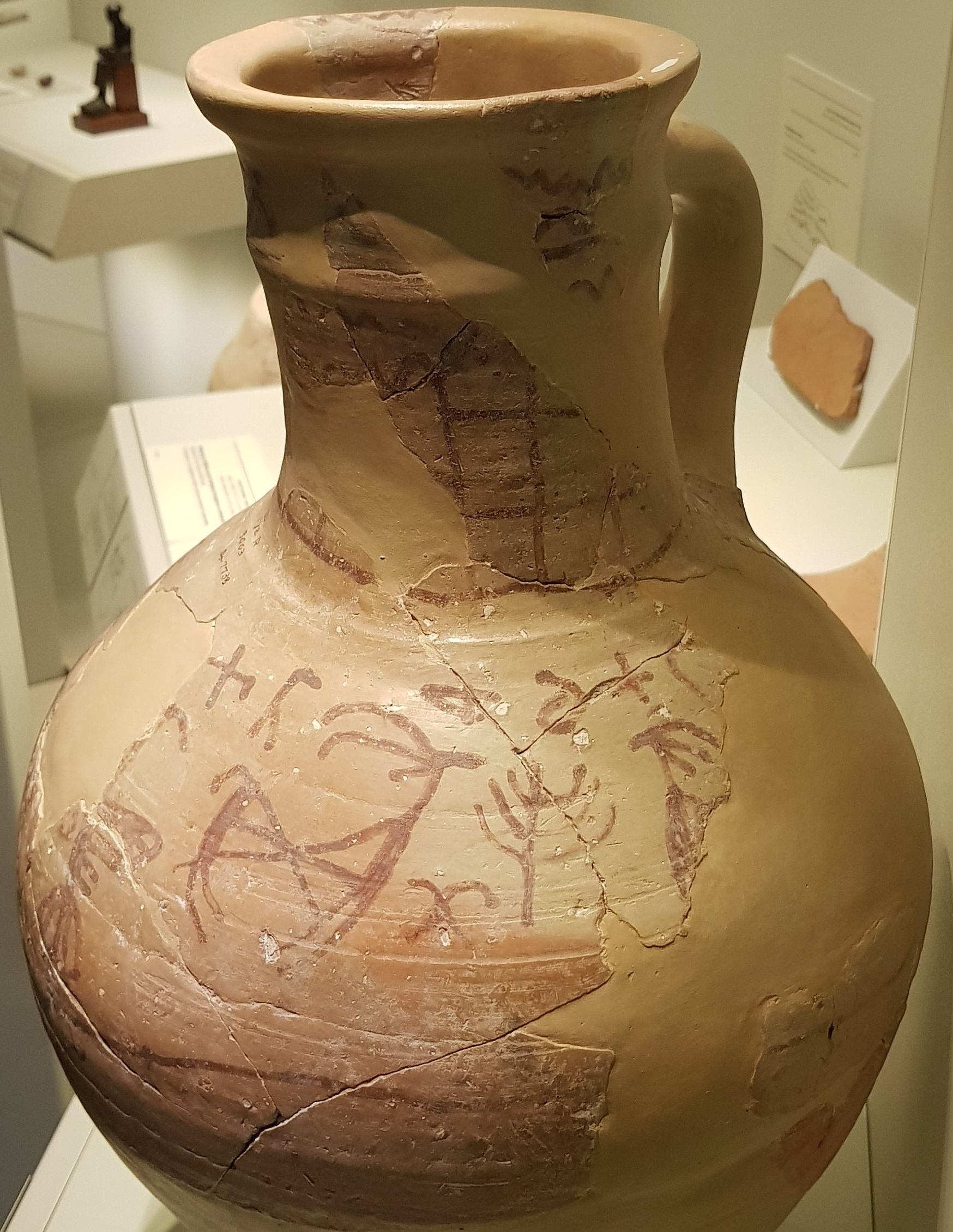
"The dedicatory inscription on the Lachish ewer [shows] the word Elat positioned immediately over the tree, indicating the... tree as a representation of the goddess Elat."

Remarking on the Lachish ewer, Hestrin noted that in a group of other pottery vessels found in situ, the usual depiction of the sacred tree flanked by Nubian ibexes or birds is in one goblet replaced by a pubic triangle flanked by ibexes. The interchange between the tree and the pubic triangle prove, according to Hestrin, that the tree symbolizes the fertility goddess Asherah. Hestrin draws parallels between this and representations of Hathor as the sycamore goddess in Egypt, and suggests that during the period of the New Kingdom of Egypt's rule in the Levant, the Hathor cult penetrated the region so extensively that she became identified with Asherah. Other motifs on the ewer, such as a lion, Persian fallow deer and Nubian ibexes seem to have a close relationship with her iconography.

Asherah may also have been associated with the ancient pan-Near Eastern "Master of Animals" motif, which depicted a person or deity standing betwixt two confronted animals. According to Beaulieu, depictions of a divine "mistress of asiatic lions" Potnia Theron motif are "almost undoubtedly depictions of the goddess Asherah." The lioness was a ubiquitous symbol for goddesses in the ancient Middle East, similar to the dove and the tree. Lionesses figure prominently in Asherah's iconography, including in post-Late Bronze Age collapse finds: in Ti'inik, an object known as the Ta'anakh cult stand was found, dating to the 10th century BCE. The Ta'anakh cult stand imagery also includes a tree motif. An earlier arrowhead from the 11th century BCE bears the inscription "Servant of the Lion Lady".

The symbols around Asherah are so many (eight-pointed star, caprids, and lunisolar, arboreal, florid, and serpentine imagery) that a listing would approach meaninglessness as it neared exhaustiveness. Frevel's dissertation ends with the pronouncement that "there is no genuine Asherah iconography".

== By region ==
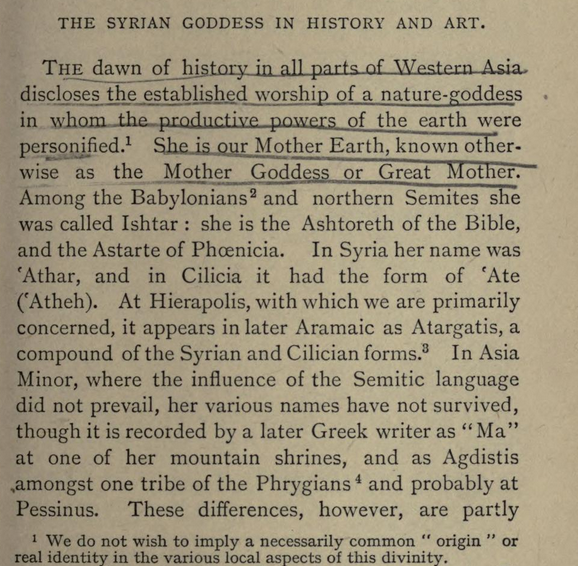
Earlier scholars were less reluctant to draw connections among the numerous similarly-named great goddesses. Langdon says ʔ-th-r-t is "surely the same" as Babylonian Ašratu, West Semitic Aširtu, and Ašerat in Ras Shamra.

=== Sumer ===
An Amorite goddess named Ashratum is known to have been worshipped in Sumer. Her Amorite provenance is further supported by her status as the wife of Mardu/Amurrum, the supreme deity of the Amorites.

A limestone slab inscribed with a dedication made by Hammurabi to Ashratum is known from Sippar. In it, he complements her as "lord of the mountain" (bel shadī), and presages similar use with words like voluptuousness, joy, tender, patient, mercy to commemorate setting up a "protective genius" (font?) for her in her temple.

Though it is accepted that Ashratum's name is cognate to that of Ugaritic Athirat, the goddess occupies different positions within the pantheons of the two religions, despite having in both the status of consort to the supreme deity.

=== Akkad ===
In Akkadian texts, Asherah appears as Aširatu; though her exact role in the pantheon is unclear; in the Sumerian votive inscription of Hammurabi, she is referred as the daughter-in-law of Anu, the sky god. In contrast, ʿAshtart is believed to be linked to the Mesopotamian goddess Ishtar who is sometimes portrayed as the daughter of Anu.

In the first of two Amorite-Akkadian bilingual tablets from the 2nd millennium BCE and published in 2022, Asherah appears in the Amorite left column as ašeratum, while the corresponding Akkadian divine name in the right column is Belet-ili, the Akkadian name of the mother goddess Ninhursag.

Points of reference in Akkadian epigraphy are collocated and heterographic in the Amarna Letters 60 and 61's Asheratic personal name. Within these Amarna letters is found a king of the Amorites by the 14th century BCE name of Abdi-Ashirta "servant of Asherah".

* EA 60 ii	um-ma ^{I}ÌR-^{d}aš-ra-tum
* EA 61 ii	[um-]ma ^{I}ÌR-a-ši-ir-te ÌR-[-ka_{4}

Each is on line ii within the letter's opening or greeting sentiment. Some may transcribe Aširatu or Ašratu.

=== Hittites ===
Among the Hittites this goddess appears as Ašertu(š) or Ašerdu(š) in the myth of Elkunirša ("El, the Creator of Earth") her husband, in which she tried to sleep with the storm god.

=== Ugarit ===
In Ugaritic texts, Asherah appears as Ugaritic: 𐎀𐎘𐎗𐎚, romanized: ʾṯrt, anglicised ʾAṯirat or Athirat. She is called ʾElat, 𐎛𐎍𐎚 ʾilt "goddess", the feminine form of ʾEl (compare Allāt); she is also called Qodeš, "holiness" (𐎖𐎄𐎌 qdš. There is reference to a šr. 'ṯtrt. Gibson says sources from before 1200 BCE almost always credit Athirat with her full title rbt ʾṯrt ym (or rbt ʾṯrt). (Note: Ugaritic 𐎗𐎁𐎚 𐎀𐎘𐎗𐎚 𐎊𐎎, rbt ʾṯrt ym) However, Rahmouni's indexing of Ugaritic epithets states the phrase occurs in only the Baal Cycle. Apparently of Akkadian origin, rabat means "lady" (literally "female great one"). She appears to champion her son, Yam, god of the sea, in his struggle against Baʾal. (Yam's ascription as god of the sea may mislead; Yam is the deified sea itself rather than a deity who holds dominion over it.) So some say Athirat's title can be translated as "Lady ʾAṯirat of the Sea", alternatively, "she who walks on the sea", or even "the Great Lady-who-tramples-Yam". This invites relation to a Chaoskampf in which neither she nor Yam is otherwise implicated. Park suggested in 2010 that the name Athirat might be derived from a passive participle form, referring to the "one followed by (the gods)", that is, "progenitress or originatress", which would correspond to Asherah's image as the "mother of the gods" in Ugaritic literature. This solution was a response to and variation of B. Margalit's of her following in Yahweh's literal footsteps, a less generous estimation nonetheless supported by DULAT's use of the Ugaritian word in an ordinary sense. Binger finds some of these risibly imaginative, and unhappily falls back on the still-problematic interpretation that Ym may also mean day, so "Lady Asherah of the day", or, more simply, "Lady Day". The common Semitic root ywm (for reconstructed Proto-Semitic *yawm-), from which derives (Hebrew: יוֹם), meaning "day", appears in several instances in the Masoretic Text with the second-root letter (-w-) having been dropped, and in a select few cases, replaced with an A-class vowel of the niqqud for Tiberian Hebrew, resulting in the word becoming y(a)m. Such occurrences, as well as the fact that the plural "days" can be read as both yomim and yāmim (Hebrew: יָמִים), give credence to this alternate translation.

Another primary epithet of Athirat was 𐎖𐎐𐎊𐎚 𐎛𐎍 qnyt ʾlm, which may be translated as "the creator of the deities". In those texts, Athirat is the consort of ʾEl; there is one reference to the seventy sons of Athirat, presumably the same as the seventy sons of ʾEl.

==== Equation with Shapshu ====
The Ugaritic texts reveal significant parallels between the goddesses Athirat and Shapshu, suggesting a possible identification. Both are referred to as "The Lady" (rbt), a title signifying supreme authority in the pantheon, and they are described as mothers of the gods, key figures in creation, and central to maintaining cosmic order. Athirat's epithet rbt ˀaṯrt ym has traditionally been interpreted as "Lady Athirat of the Sea". Recent analyses propose that ym might mean "day" instead of "sea". This reading aligns with Athirat's name (ˀaṯrt), meaning "the one who goes", reflecting the sun's journey across the sky.

Another significant reason for this conflation would be a passage found in Ugaritic inscription KTU 1.23 which describes the myth known as The Gracious and Most Beautiful Gods. In this text, the twins Shahar "Dawn" and Shalim "Dusk", are described as the offspring of El through two women he meets at the seashore. The brothers are both nursed by "The Lady", likely Asherah, and in other Ugaritic texts, the two are associated with the sun goddess Shapshu.

=== Israel and Judah ===
There is significant debate on whether Asherah was worshipped in ancient Israelite religion. Some scholars argue that Asherah was venerated as Yahweh's consort, while others oppose this arguing that the relevant Hebrew epigraphic evidence actually refers to some cultic place or object rather than a goddess.

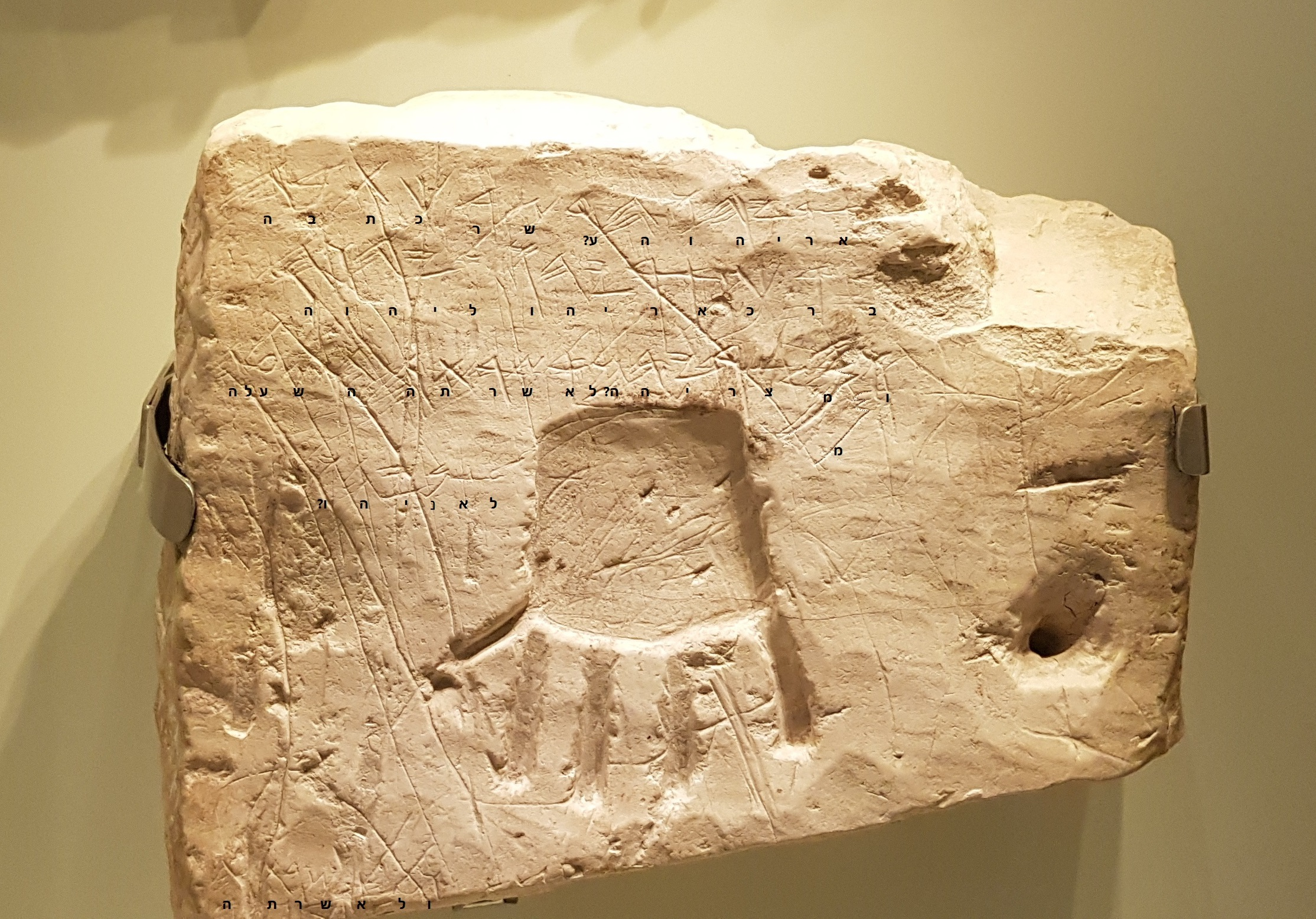
Khirbet el-Qom's hand is a symbol of Asherah as a protector, but there is no scholarly hypothesis on why it appears upside-down.

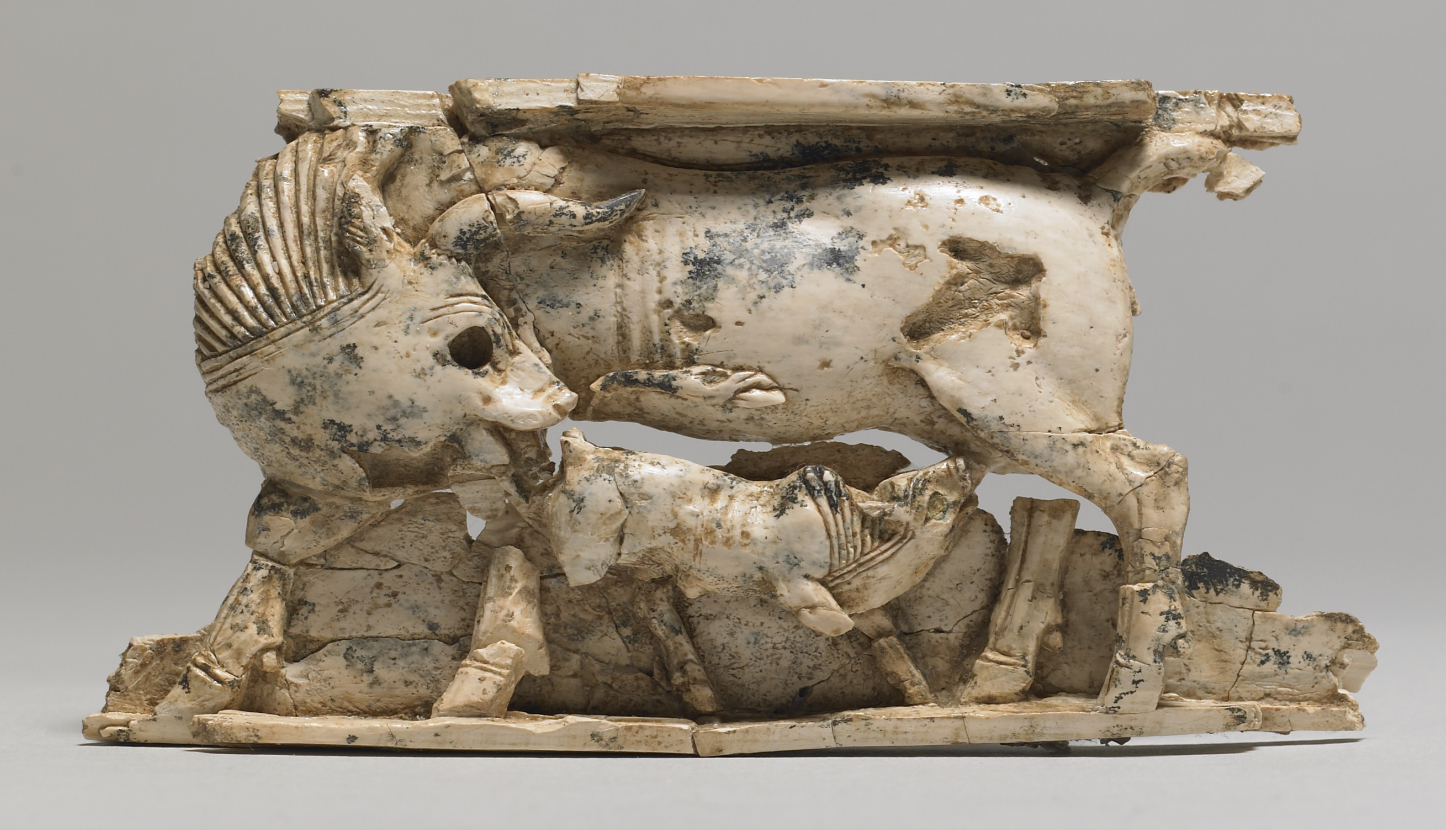
Kuntillet Ajrud's jar has this common motif in illustration. Another alluring symbol of the Goddess, the suckling bovine.

==== Inscriptions ====
Possible evidence for her worship includes an iconography and inscriptions at two locations in use circa the 9th century. The first was in a cave at Khirbet el-Qom.

The second was at Kuntillet Ajrud. In the latter, a jar shows bovid-anthropomorphic figures and several inscriptions that refer to "Yahweh of Samaria and his Asherah" and "Yahweh of Teman and his Asherah". However, a number of scholars hold that the "asherah" mentioned in the inscriptions refers to some kind of cultic object or symbol, rather than a goddess. Some scholars have argued that since cognate forms of "asherah" are used with the meaning of "sanctuary" in Phoenician and Aramaic inscriptions from the same period, this may also be the meaning of the term in the two Hebrew inscriptions. Others argue that the term "asherah" may refer to a sacred tree used for the worship of Yahweh as this is the meaning that the Hebrew term has in the Hebrew Bible and in the Mishnah.

In one potsherd there appear a large and small bovine. This "oral fixation" motif has diverse examples, see figs 413–419 in Winter. In fact, already Flinders Petrie in the 1930s was referring to Davies on the memorable stereotype. It's such a common motif in Syrian and Phoenician ivories that the Arslan Tash horde had at least four.

==== Sacred prostitution ====
Early scholarship emphasized somewhat mutually-negating possibilities of holy prostitution, hieros gamos, and orgiastic rites. It has been suggested by several scholars that there is a relationship between the position of the gəḇirā in the royal court and the worship of Asherah in 1 Kings 15:13, 18:19, and 2 Kings 10:13.

The Hebrew Bible frequently and graphically associates goddess worship with prostitution (זְנוּת zənuṯ "whoredom") in material written after the reforms of King Josiah. Jeremiah and Ezekiel blame goddess worship for making Yahweh "jealous", and cite his jealousy as the reason he allowed the destruction of Jerusalem in 587 BCE. Although their nature remains uncertain, sexual rites typically revolved around women of power and influence, such as Maacah. The Hebrew term qadishtu, formerly translated as "temple prostitutes", literally means "priestesses" or "consecrated women", from the Semitic root qdš, meaning "holy". However, sacred prostitution is no longer a broad presumption. Some argue that sex acts within the temple were limited to yearly sacred fertility rites aimed at assuring an abundant harvest.

==== In the Hebrew Bible ====
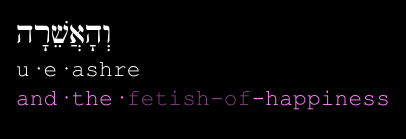
Earlier obfuscations like this translation of her name as a "fetish of happiness" long made Asherah difficult to see.

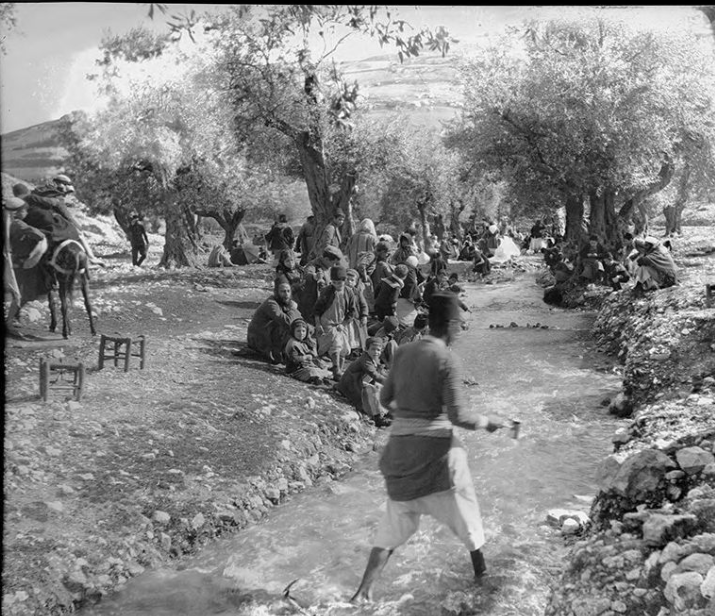
1900, grove at brook Kidron, Jerusalem, Gertrude Bell

There are references to the worship of numerous deities throughout the Books of Kings: Solomon builds temples to many deities and Josiah is reported as removing cultic items of Asherah in the temple Solomon built for Yahweh. Josiah's grandfather Manasseh had erected a statue of Asherah or perhaps an asherah pole (2 Kings 21:7).

The noun ʾăšērâ appears forty times in the Hebrew Bible, although in most cases this refers to some cultic object. The word is translated in Septuagint as Greek: ἄλσος (grove; plural: ἄλση) in every instance apart from Isaiah 17:8; 27:9 and 2 Chronicles 15:16; 24:18, with Greek: δένδρα (trees) being used for the former, and, peculiarly, Ἀστάρτη (Astarte) for the latter. The Vulgate in Latin provided lucus or nemus, a grove or a wood. From the Vulgate, the King James translation of the Bible uses grove or groves instead of Asherah's name. Non-scholarly English language readers of the Bible would not have read her name for more than 400 years afterward. The association of Asherah with trees in the Hebrew Bible is very strong. For example, she is found under trees (1 Kings 14:23; 2 Kings 17:10) and is made of wood by human beings (1 Kings 14:15, 2 Kings 16:3–4). The farther from the time of Josiah's reforms, the broader the perception of an Asherah became. Trees described in later Jewish texts as being an asherah or part of an asherah include grapevines, pomegranates, walnuts, myrtles, and willows. Eventually, monotheistic leaders would suppress the tree due to its association with Asherah.

Deuteronomy 12:3 has Yahweh commanding the destruction of asherah poles so as to maintain purity of his worship. Jezebel brought hundreds of prophets for Baal and Asherah with her into the Israelite court.

William Dever's book Did God Have a Wife? discusses Judean female pillar figurines, the queen of heaven name, and the cakes. Dever also points to the temple at Tel Arad, the famous archaeological site with cannabinoids and massebot. Dever notes: "The only goddess whose name is well attested in the Hebrew Bible (or in ancient Israel generally) is Asherah."

=== Philistine records ===
Various partial inscriptions found on destroyed seventh century BCE jars in Ekron contain words like šmn "oil", dbl "fig cake", qdš "holy", l'šrt "to Asherah", and lmqm "for the shrine". This has been taken as evidence that Asherah was worshipped in Philistia. However, Frank Moore Cross argues that the "asherah" mentioned in the Ekron inscription refers to a shrine, not to the goddess.

=== In Egyptian sources ===
Attempts to identify Asherah within the pantheon of ancient Egypt have been met with both limited acceptance and controversy.

Beginning during the Eighteenth Dynasty of Egypt, a Semitic goddess named Qetesh ("holiness", sometimes reconstructed as Qudshu) appears prominently. That dynasty follows expulsion of occupying foreigners from an intermediary period. René Dussard suggested a connection to Asherah in 1941. Subsequent studies tried to find further evidence for equivalence of Qetesh and Asherah, although Wiggins does not. His hesitance did not dissuade subsequent scholars from equating Asherah with Qetesh.

=== Arabia ===
As ʾAṯirat (Qatabanian: 𐩱𐩻𐩧𐩩 ʾṯrt), the goddess is attested in several Pre-Islamic inscriptions from south Arabia dating from the mid-first millennium BCE to the mid-first millennium CE. As she is sometimes mentioned alongside the moon-gods Wadd and ʿAmm, she might have been considered a consort of either of them or both.

One of the Tema stones (CIS II 113) discovered by Charles Huber in 1883 in the ancient oasis of Tema, northwestern Arabia, and now located at the Louvre, believed to date to the time of Nabonidus's retirement there in 549 BCE, bears an inscription in Aramaic that mentions Ṣelem of Maḥram (צלם זי מחרמ), Šingalāʾ (שנגלא), and ʾAšîrāʾ (אשירא) as the deities of Tema. It is unclear whether the name would be an Aramaic vocalisation of the Ugaritic ʾAṯirat or a later borrowing of the Hebrew ʾĂšērāh or similar form. In any event, Watkins says the root of both names is a Proto-Semitic *ʾṯrt. Pritchard excerpts the mention wšnglʔ wʔšyrʔ ʔlhy tymʔ and differs on the root's meaning.

The Arabic root ʾṯr (as in أثر ʾaṯar, "trace") is similar in meaning to the Hebrew ʾāšar, indicating "to tread", used as a basis to explain Asherah's epithet "of the sea" as "she who treads the ym (sea)."

Asherah survived late in remote South Arabia as seen in some common era Qatabanian and Maʕinian inscriptions.

== See also ==
=== Deities ===
- Al-Lat
- Ashima
- Ašratum
- Ashtar-Chemosh
- ʿAṯtar
- Hathor
- Inanna (Ishtar)
- Ishara
- Ishtarat
- Išartu
- Qetesh (Qudshu)
- Queen of Heaven (antiquity)
- Shapshu

=== Other ===
- Lilith
- Kuntillet ʿAjrud – inscriptions
- Nehushtan
- Revadim Asherah – Bronze age figures
- Judean pillar figure – Iron age figures
- Semitic neopaganism
- Shekhinah
- Tel Arad
- Asherah pole
- Xoanon
- Fig-cake (fruit)
- Ashteroth Karnaim

== Bibliography ==
- Ahituv, Shmuel (2014). "Notes on the Kuntillet 'Ajrud Inscriptions". In Eshel, Esther; Levin, Yigal (eds.). "See, I will bring a scroll recounting what befell me" (Ps 40:8): Epigraphy and Daily Life from the Bible to the Talmud. Vandenhoeck & Ruprecht. pp. 29–38. ISBN 978-3-647-55062-6.
- Ahlström, Gösta W. (1963), Engnell, Ivan; Furumark, Arne; Nordström, Carl-Otto (eds.), Aspects of Syncretism in Israelite Religion, Horae Soederblominae 5, translated by Sharpe, Eric J., Lund, SE: C.W.K. Gleerup, p. 68
- Albright, W. F. (1968), Yahweh and the gods of Canaan: a historical analysis of two contrasting faiths, London: University of London, Athlone Press, pp. 105–106, ISBN 9780931464010
- Albright, William Foxwell (1969). The Proto-Sinaitic Inscriptions and Their Decipherment. Harvard University Press. ISBN 0-608-18593-0.
- Barker, Margaret (2012), The Mother of the Lord Volume 1: The Lady in the Temple, T & T Clark, ISBN 9780567528155
- Beaulieu, Stéphane (1 January 2007). "Eve's Ritual: the Judahite Sacred Marriage Rite". Concordia University.
- Binger, Tilde (1997), Asherah: Goddesses in Ugarit, Israel and the Old Testament (1st ed.), Sheffield: Sheffield Academic Press, pp. 42–93, ISBN 9780567119766
- Cornelius, Sakkie (2004). "A Preliminary Typology for the Female Plaque Figurines and Their Value for the Religion of Ancient Palestine and Jordan" (PDF). Journal of Northwest Semitic Languages 30/1: 21–39. Archived from the original (PDF) on 8 December 2023.
- Dever, William G. (2005), Did God Have A Wife?: Archaeology And Folk Religion In Ancient Israel, Wm. B. Eerdmans Publishing, ISBN 9780802828521
- Emerton, J. A. (1982). "New Light on Israelite Religion: The Implications of the Inscriptions from Kuntillet ʿAjrud". Zeitschrift für die Alttestamentliche Wissenschaft. 94: 2–20. doi:10.1515/zatw.1982.94.1.2. S2CID 170614720.
- Goldwasser, Orly (2006), "Canaanites Reading Hieroglyphs. Horus is Hathor? - The Invention of the Alphabet in Sinai", Egypt and the Levant, 16: 121–160
- Hadley, Judith M. (2000), The Cult of Asherah in Ancient Israel and Judah: The Evidence for a Hebrew Goddess, University of Cambridge Oriental publications, 57, Cambridge University Press, ISBN 9780521662352
- Keel, Othmar (1998). Goddesses and Trees, New Moon and Yahweh. Sheffield: Burns & Oates. ISBN 978-1-85075-915-7.
- Kien, Jenny (2000), Reinstating the Divine Woman in Judaism, Universal Publishers, ISBN 9781581127638, OCLC 45500083
- Locatell, Christian; McKinny, Chris; Shai, Itzhaq (30 September 2022). "Tree of Life Motif, Late Bronze Canaanite Cult, and a Recently Discovered Krater from Tel Burna". Journal of the American Oriental Society. 142 (3). doi:10.7817/jaos.142.3.2022.ar024. ISSN 2169-2289. (Access only by subscription or article purchase.)
- Long, Asphodel P. (1993), In a Chariot Drawn by Lions: The Search for the Female in Deity, Crossing Press, ISBN 9780895945754.
- Margalit, Baruch (1989), "Some Observations On the Inscription and Drawing From Khirbet El-Qôm", Vetus Testamentum, XXXIX (3): 371–378, doi:10.1163/156853389X00534, ISSN 0042-4935
- Myer, Allen C. (2000), "Asherah", Eerdmans Dictionary of the Bible, Amsterdam University Press
- Olyan, Saul M. (1988). Asherah and the Cult of Yahweh in Israel. Atlanta, Georgia: Atlanta, Ga. : Scholars Press. ISBN 978-1-55540-253-2.
- Ornan, Tallay (2005). The Triumph of the Symbol: Pictorial Representation of Deities in Mesopotamia and the Biblical Image Ban. Saint-Paul. ISBN 978-3-525-53007-8.
- Park, Sung Jin (2010). "Short Notes on the Etymology of Asherah". Ugarit Forschungen. 42: 527–534.
- Park, Sung Jin (2011). "The Cultic Identity of Asherah in Deuteronomistic Ideology of Israel". Zeitschrift für die Alttestamentliche Wissenschaft. 123 (4): 553–564. doi:10.1515/zaw.2011.036. ISSN 0044-2526. S2CID 170589596.
- Patai, Raphael (1990), The Hebrew Goddess, Jewish folklore and anthropology, Wayne State University Press, ISBN 9780814322710, OCLC 20692501.
- Rahmouni, Aicha (2008), Divine Epithets in the Ugaritic Alphabetic Texts, translated by Ford, J. N., Leiden, NE: Brill, ISBN 9789004157699
- Reed, William Laforest (1949), The Asherah in the Old Testament, Texas Christian University Press, OCLC 491761457.
- Sass, Benjamin (2014). "On Epigraphic Hebrew ʾŠR and *ʾŠRH, and on Biblical Asherah". Transeuphratène. J. Elayi – J.-M. Durand (eds.). Bible et Proche-Orient. Mélanges André Lemaire. 3 vol. (Transeuphratène 44-46; Pendé: Gabalda, 2014). 46: 47–66 (with Pls. 4–5 on 189–190). ISSN 0996-5904.
- Stuckey, Johanna H. (1 January 2002). "The Great Goddesses of the Levant". Journal for the Study of Egyptian Antiquities.
- Taylor, Joan E. (1995), "The Asherah, the Menorah and the Sacred Tree", Journal for the Study of the Old Testament, 20 (66), University of Sheffield, Dept. of Biblical Studies: 29–54, doi:10.1177/030908929502006602, ISSN 0309-0892, OCLC 88542166, S2CID 170422840
- Wiggins, Steve A. (1993), A Reassessment of 'Asherah': A Study according to the Textual Sources of the First Two Millennia B.C.E, Alter Orient und Altes Testament, Bd. 235., Verlag Butzon & Bercker, ISBN 9783788714796
- Wiggins, Steve A. (2007). A Reassessment of Asherah: With Further Considerations of the Goddess. Gorgias Ugaritic Studies. Vol. 2 (2nd ed.). Piscataway, NJ: Gorgias Press. ISBN 978-1-59333-717-9. OCLC 171049273.
- Winter, Urs (1983). Frau und Göttin (in German). Freiburg, Schweiz Göttingen: Vandenhoeck & Ruprecht. ISBN 3-525-53673-9.
- Wyatt, N. (1999). "Asherah". In van der Toorn, K.; Becking, Bob; Horst, Pieter Willem van der (eds.). Dictionary of Deities and Demons in the Bible (2nd ed.). Grand Rapids, Michigan: Wm. B. Eerdmans Publishing. pp. 99–105. ISBN 978-0-8028-2491-2.
- Wyatt, N. (2003), Religious Texts from Ugarit (2nd ed.), London: Sheffield Academic Press
