= Elkunirša =

Hittite god of a Canaanite origin

Elkunirša (in Hittite: ^{D}el-ku-ni-ir-ša or ^{D}el-ku-ni-ir-ša-aš) is a Hittite god of a Canaanite origin. The god is known from a myth in Hittite, believed to be originated from Canaan, as well as one ritual tablet.

== Myth of Elkunirša ==
Elkunirša's myth was discovered only in Hittite, but scholars are certain its origin is Canaanite. It is known from a tablet (CTH 342.1) found at Hattusa. The Canaanite origin is learned by the names of the deities in the myth. Elkunirša is a Hittite version of El qône ereṣ, known from ʾAzatiwada inscription, Genesis 14:19 and other Canaanite and Aramaic instances. Ašertu is ʾAšerah. Two other divine names appear in ideograms, one – ^{D}U – belongs to the weather god, here identified as Baʿal, and the other – ^{D}IŠTAR – is identified here as ʿAnat or ʿAštart. The myth also bears Canaanite stylistic features. There is also a reference to the land Amurru and a-na-[...] (probably the land Ḫana or the city ʿAnat).

The text was unearthed in several fragments, probably all belonging to one tablet, and their order was restored by scholars.

The surviving part of the myth opens with a figure delivering Ašertu's threatens to Baʿal, that if he doesn't sleep with her, she will hurt him. Baʿal goes to the source of the Euphrates, to Elkunirša's tent. Elkunirša asks him why he came, and he reported him that Ašertu, his wife, sent young women who delivered him her proposition to sleep with him, that he declined her, and that she threatened him. Elkunirša replied: "Go threaten(?) her [...] and humble her". Baʿal went to Ašertu and told her: "I have killed your seventy-seven [children]. (Your) eighty-eight I have killed." Ašertu became sad, appointed mourning women, and lamented for seven years. Then, fragmented, mentioned "ate and drank" (maybe a part of a wake feast), and then, a missing part whose length is undetermined.

After the missing part, the threats towards Baʿal are repeated, now in third-person – Ašertu described to Elkunirša what she intends to do to Baʿal, and then she says she will sleep with him (with Elkunirša). Elkunirša tells her to do as she wishes. Then, it is said that ʿAnat/ʿAštart heard the conversation, she "became a cup in Elkunirša's hand, became an owl and perched on his wall (or shoulder)." it is possible that the Hittite translator confused the two meanings of the West Semitic word kôs: a cup and a species of owls. Elkunirša and his wife went to sleep together, and ʿAnat/ʿAštart flew like a bird over the desert, and warned Baʿal not to drink wine with Ašertu. The tablet is damaged here again, but it can be learned from the damaged part that Baʿal is found in the underworld and ʿAnat/ʿAštart with the underworld deities try to cure Baʿal's wounds, probably resulted by Ašertu who succeeded in her plot.

After another missing part of the text, it seems Baʿal undergoes an exorcism, in which exorcists from Amurru and the land Ḫana or the city ʿAnat take part. The text is too damaged to understand the nature of the ritual. The rest of the myth did not survive.

The plot of the myth finds parallels in the plot of the Egyptian Tale of Two Brothers and the biblical tale of Joseph and Potiphar's wife.

== Ritual text ==
The god ^{D}ku-ni-ir-ša, variant of Elkunirša, is mentioned in a damaged context in a Hittite ritual text.
