= Matzevah =

Sacred pillar (in the Bible) or Jewish headstone

A masseba, matzeva or mazzebah (Biblical Hebrew: מַצֵּבָה, romanized: maṣṣēḇā, lit. 'pillar, stele, baetyl', (Note: Biblical Hebrew pronunciation: [ˌmatsˀeːˈbɑː] Modern Hebrew ˌmatsɛˈva) plural maṣṣēḇoṯ) is a term used in the Hebrew Bible for a baetyl, a type of sacred column or standing stone. In the Septuagint, it is translated as Koine Greek: στήλη, romanized: stēlē (stele).

Archaeologists have adopted the term for these stones in Canaan and the pre-Islamic Arab Nabataean Kingdom. In the context of Jewish funerary practices, the term matzevah, pl. matzevot, is used for grave markers or tombstones.

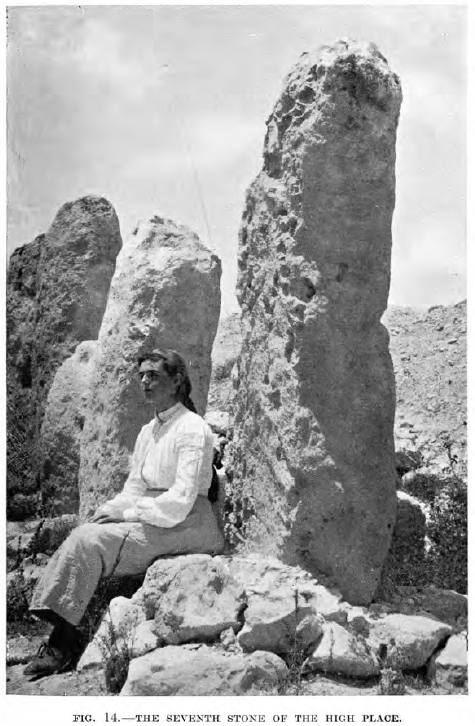
R. A. Stewart Macalister excavated a circle of ten or more massebot at Gezer

== Etymology ==
The Hebrew word is derived from a Semitic root meaning 'to stand', which led to the meaning "pillar".

In transcription, many spellings are possible.

== Biblical narrative ==
Use of the term can be found in Genesis 28:18, 28:22, 31:13, 31:45, 35:14, 35:20, Exodus 24:4, Deuteronomy 16:22 and Hosea 3:4.

=== Jacob ===
The Patriarch Jacob set up four massebot in the Hebrew Bible:

- In Bethel, the origin of the term baetyl. In Genesis 28, "Jacob then made a vow, saying, “If God remains with me, protecting me on this journey that I am making, and giving me bread to eat and clothing to wear, and I return safe to my father’s house— Yahweh shall be my God. And this stone, which I have set up as a pillar, shall be God’s abode; and of all that You give me, I will set aside a tithe for You.”
- In Mizpah in Benjamin.
- In Bethel a second time. In Genesis 31:13, Yahweh says to Jacob, "I am the God of Bethel, where you anointed a pillar and where you made a vow to Me."
- At Rachel's grave: "Over her grave Jacob set up a pillar; it is the pillar at Rachel’s grave to this day." (Genesis 35:20) It could also stand as a witness: upon confronting Jacob in Gilead: "And Laban said to Jacob, "Here is this mound and here the pillar which I have set up between you and me: this mound shall be witness and this pillar shall be witness that I am not to cross to you past this mound, and that you are not to cross to me past this mound and this pillar, with hostile intent." (Genesis 31:52)

=== Other ===
Moses is mentioned as erecting an altar and 12 massebot, "according [representing?] to the twelve tribes of Israel", before ascending the mountain for 40 days and nights to meet with God. He also commands the people to set up "large stones" and cover them in plaster upon entering Israel to write the religious law upon.

Joshua set up a "large stone" to commemorate a covenant at Shechem. Though it is not called a massebah in text, its function is identical to massebot set up to commemorate treaties and events.

Abimelech was crowned king near a massebah in Shechem, and Joash may have also been crowned near a massebah. Rehoboam erected massebot for the purposes of worship (indicated by their condemnation).

Leviticus 26:1 may indicate a prohibition on the use of massebot as representations of God. The specific prohibition includes it in a list, prohibiting the creation of idols, graven images, erecting standing "images" (massebot), or any other image of stone with the intention of bowing before it. Exodus 23:24 indicates that gentiles also erected massebot, which is likely the reason for this prohibition, alongside consolidation of authorized ritual spaces to center on the Jerusalem Temple. Deuteronomy 16:21-22 supports this by banning the creation of a particular kind of sacred grove/"asherah" near the creation of altars (given the use of the word asherah, it is referencing a pagan practice) and then bans erecting massebot, likely as a continuation of the previous passage. However, Isaiah 19:19 mentions the future erection of massebot in a positive context outside of altars, shrines, or temples, indicating this was not a total ban in massebot.

== Archeology ==
Massebot have been found inside shrines dating to the 8th century BCE, indicating an aniconic usage of these as representations of the divine. In Canaanite/Israelite contexts, they are usually undecorated, whereas similar standing stones in West Asia are not.

== See also ==
- Asherah pole, Canaanite object honouring Asherah
- Bema and high place
- Ceremonial pole
- Lingam, abstract representation of the Hindu god Shiva
- Menhir, orthostat, or standing stone: upright stone, typically from the Bronze Age
