= Ishtarat =

Semitic goddess, variant of Ishtar

Ishtarat was a Semitic deity worshipped in the city of Mari, Syria. Her temple was found in 1952.

Ishtarat was most probably a variant of Ishtar, who was worshipped beside Ishtarat in Mari.
