= Punic Tabella Defixionis =

7th or 6th century Punic language curse tablet

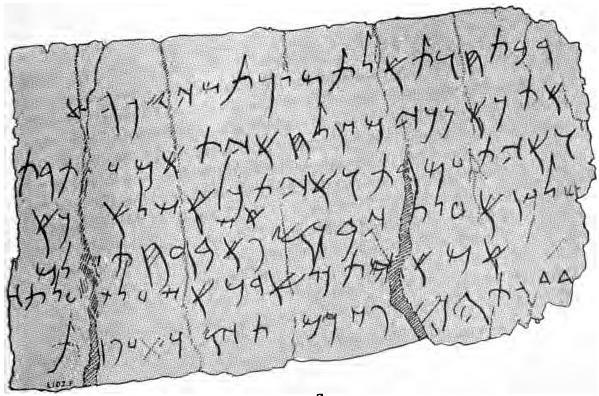
The Punic Tabella Defixionis

The Punic Tabella Defixionis is a 7th or 6th century Punic language curse tablet, inscribed on a lead scroll, found in Carthage by Paul Gauckler in 1899. It is currently held at the Carthage National Museum. It is known as KAI 89.

It is unique as the only fully legible Tabella Defixionis (Latin for curse tablet) known in the Punic-Phoenician language.

The inscription reads:

R[B?]T ḤWT ʾLT M[LK?]T Š[Y?]SK H[ʾ]
Gr[ea]t(?) Ḥawwat, goddess, q[ue]en(?), ne[cc]esary(?) is thi[s],

ʾTK ʾNKY MṢLḤ ʾYT ʾMʿ[Š]TRT
that ּwith you are I, Matzliah, Amoa[sh]tart,

WʾYT ʿMRT WʾYT KL ʾŠ Lʾ Kʾ
and (not with you is) ʿMRT, and everything that belongs to her, for

ʿLŠʾ ʿLTY B[K]SP ^{ʾŠ} ʾBRḤT [ʾ?]/[Š?]L[M]
she rejoiced against me in the [m]oney I'd lost [fo]re[ver](?)/[wh]ol[ly](?),

ʾM ʾYT KL ʾDM ʾŠ [Š?]L[K?]/[ʾ?]L[Ṣ?] ʿLTY
that any and every man who is [t]o y[ou](?)/[com]pe[lled](?) to me

[B]BRḤT HKSP Z KM TYSK ʾʿPRT
[in] stealing the money, will consume lead!
