= Kuntillet Ajrud =

Archaeological site in the Sinai Peninsula

- كونتيلة عجرود (Arabic) חורבת תימן (Hebrew)
- Location within Sinai
- 30°11′10″N 34°25′41″E
- Periods: Iron Age
- Cultures: Israelite
- Region: Sinai

Site notes
- Material: Stone
- Excavation dates: 1975–76
- Archaeologists: Ze'ev Meshel

Kuntillet ʿAjrud (Arabic: كونتيلة عجرود) or Horvat Teman (Hebrew: חורבת תימן) is a late 9th/early 8th centuries BCE site in the northeast part of the Sinai Peninsula. It is frequently described as a shrine, though this is not certain. The Kuntillet Ajrud inscriptions discovered in the excavations are significant in biblical archaeology.

Kuntillet Ajrud is in the north Sinai; carbon-14 dating indicates occupation from 801–770 BCE, and the eponymous texts may have been written c. 800 BCE. As a perennial water source in this arid region, it constituted an important station on an ancient trade route connecting the Gulf of Aqaba (an inlet of the Red Sea) and the Mediterranean. It was located only 50 kilometers from the major oasis of Kadesh Barnea. Additionally, despite its proximity to the Kingdom of Judah, it has an association with the northern Kingdom of Israel (Samaria): "elements of the material culture such as the pottery, the 'northern' orthography in certain inscriptions, and reference to YHWH of Samaria suggest that Kuntillet ʿAjrud was an Israelite outpost, or at the very least, had a strong Israelite presence".

== Investigation ==
The site then known as "Contellet Garaiyeh", was identified in 1869 by Edward Henry Palmer as "Gypsaria" on the Tabula Peutingeriana: "Our own route, however, from Contellet Garaiyeh to the ruins in Lussan, was, as may be seen from the map, within a mile or so of the distance between Gypsaria and Lysa; and our discovery at the first-mentioned place of the remains of an ancient fort, renders its identity with the third station on the list more than probable."

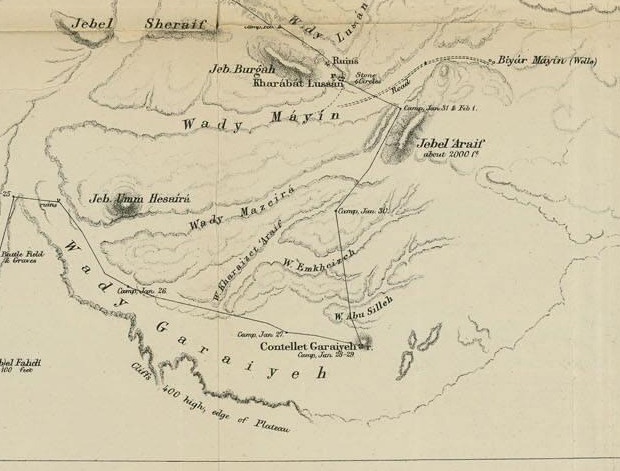
Kuntillet Ajrud, then "Contellet Garaiyeh", in 1871

== Function of the site and its affiliation ==
Kuntillet ʿAjrud provided one of the few water sources along the Darb el-Ghazza (the Gaza Road, in Arabic), which stretched from the site of ancient Eilat and/or Ezion-Geber (Tell el-Kheleifeh), past Kuntillet ʿAjrud and Kadesh Barnea (Tell el-Qudeirat), and up to Gaza. Neither Kuntillet ʿAjrud nor Kadesh-Barnea lie on the most direct Darb el-Ghazza route, but they both provided convenient water sources, so they would have served as a caravanserai, or a state-sponsored military fortress. The latter seems corroborated by the four inscriptions with the military title "Commander of the Fortress" (śr ʿr) that were found at the site, three of them on storage jars and one on the plastered walls of the fortress.

Ze'ev Meshel's original official publication on the site, especially the chapter on the art authored by Pirhiya Beck, suggested it had a religious function. Its revised Hebrew edition nonetheless eliminates the reference to a religious site and replaces Beck's article with a chapter by Talley Ornan who interpreted the art within the context of the palace and state. Meshel's initial claim that it was a religious site was based on the inscriptions and drawings with religious themes, as well as an unusual amount of linen that was found at the site, supposedly related to the wardrobe of priests. Nadav Na'aman and Nurit Lissovsky even conjectured that a prominent sacred tree (or a sacred grove) grew in the vicinity of the site. As pointed out by Hadley and Schniedewind, the site has no temple, shrine, or cultic objects. Smoak and Schniedewind warn that inscriptions and drawings with religious themes do not necessitate a religious interpretation for the site as a whole, as religion was part of the daily life of soldiers, scribes, and merchants that used the site. The presence of linen has ceased to be unique since the discovery of similar textiles at Kadesh Barnea, a phenomenon that Susan Ackerman ascribes to the arid climate. Talley Ornan has shown that all the Kuntillet ʿAjrud drawings have direct parallels in neo-Assyrian palace reliefs, not cultic shrines. "The image of the king on the entrance pilaster of Building A define it as a royal edifice" that might have "included a cultic architectural unit".

The fortress is usually assumed to be Israelian based on the personal names that use the distinctively Israelian -yaw theophoric as well as the references to "Yahweh of Samaria". Although the location of the site within the central Sinai would normally point to a Judean hegemony, the pottery excavated at the site also points strongly to the Israelian heritage of its occupants. Moreover, as Smoak and Schniedewind indicate, the Phoenician script of the inscriptions, with Hebrew spelling and morphology, testifies that the Israelian script retained its connection with the Phoenician coast longer than the Judean script. In their opinion, the site gives evidence of Israelian religion during the Iron IIB period (ca. 840–721 BCE), which underscores the importance of not conflating Israelian and Judean religion.

== Inscription ==
The site was excavated in 1975/76 by Tel Aviv University archaeologist Ze'ev Meshel, and the excavation report was published in 2012. The fortress-like main building is divided into two rooms, one large and the other small, both with low benches. Both rooms contained various paintings and inscriptions on the walls and on two large water-jars (pithoi), one found in each room.

The vigorously debated paintings on the pithoi show various animals, stylised trees, and human figures, some of which may represent gods. They appear to have been done over a fairly considerable period and by several different artists, and do not form coherent scenes. The iconography is entirely Syrian/Phoenician and lacks any connection to the Egyptian models commonly found in Iron Age IIB Israel art.

After the first impressions of complete uniqueness of the finds ("unlike anything known so far in the Levant"), scholars moved largely in the direction of recognizing their expected embeddedness in the Near Eastern context. Thus Talley Ornan has shown that all the Kuntillet ʿAjrud drawings have direct parallels in neo-Assyrian palace reliefs, while Smoak and Schniedewind have found correlates of all the inscriptions in widespread and very well-attested early Iron Age scribal curricula of Mesopotamian type. Both Ornan and Schniedewind stress the transient role of drawings and inscriptions, respectively. Ornan saw the "transient pottery drawings" as preliminary sketches in preparation for wall paintings, while Schniedewind considered the inscriptions as typical scribal exercises that were part of the scribal training of soldiers located in the fortress. An equal lowering of sensational enthusiasm is also observed in relation to the two most commented figures from the pithos A. Mordechai Gilula's original theory that tied the two images to the inscription and suggested that they represent Yahweh and the goddess Asherah was gradually almost abandoned – the seven scholars who have presented the most detailed analyses of the Kuntillet ʿAjrud iconography: Beck, Keel and Uehlinger, Hadley, Schmidt, Ornan, and Lewis all argued that the two standing figures on the pithos A are Bes or Bes-like.

== See also ==
- Khirbet el-Qom
- Asherah
- Yahweh
