= Ta'anach =

Ta'anach can refer to:

- Ti'inik, a Palestinian village in the West Bank, site of the ancient city of Ta'anach
- Ta'anakh cult stand, a 10th century artifact found at the same site
- Ta'anakh, the name of an Israeli regional council that extends into the West Bank
