= Kuntillet Ajrud inscriptions =

Religious inscriptions from the Sinai peninsula, Egypt

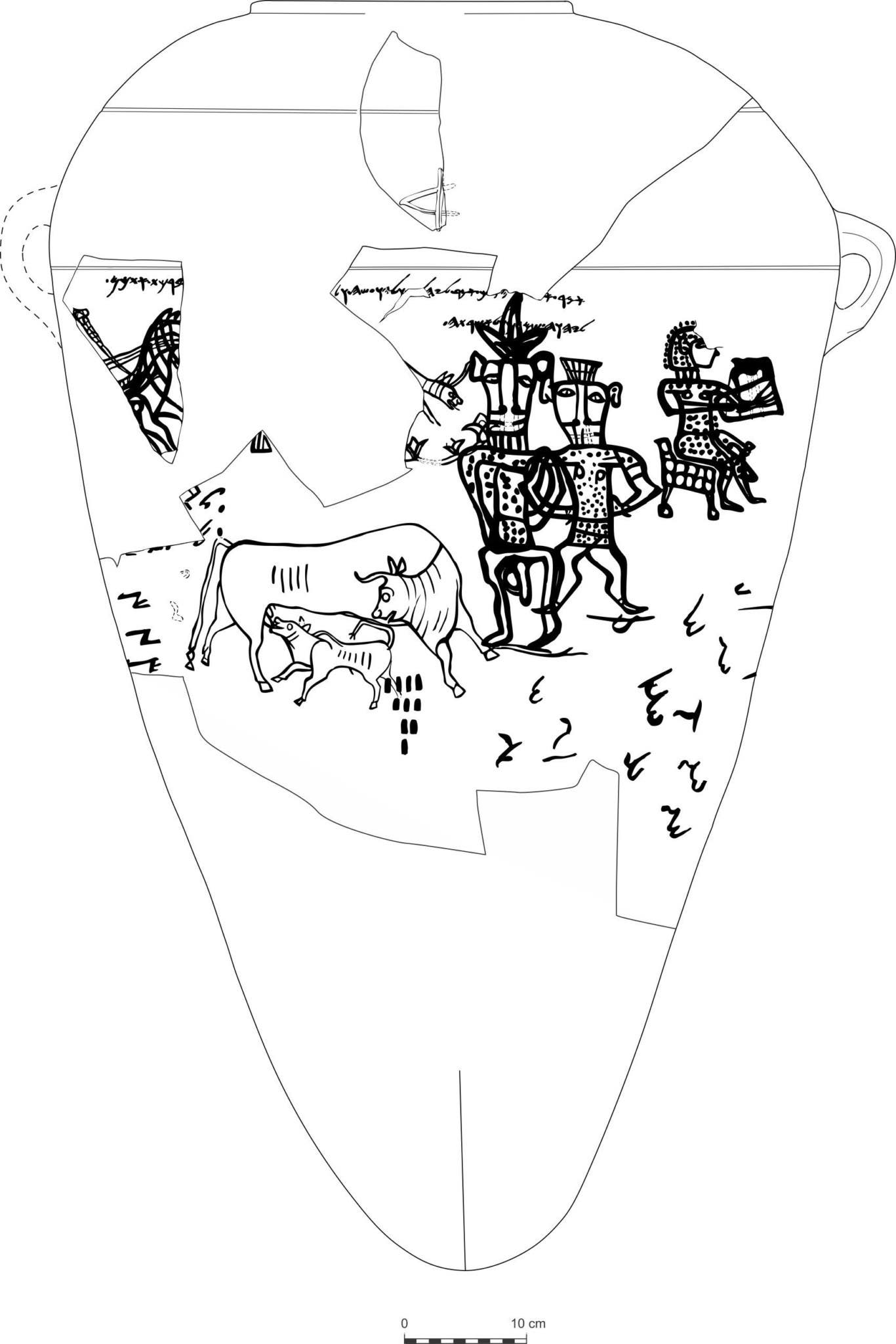
Pithos A shows five figures. There are a cow and a calf. A seated musician or weaver is to one side, above: the phrase "Yahweh of Samaria and his Asherah."

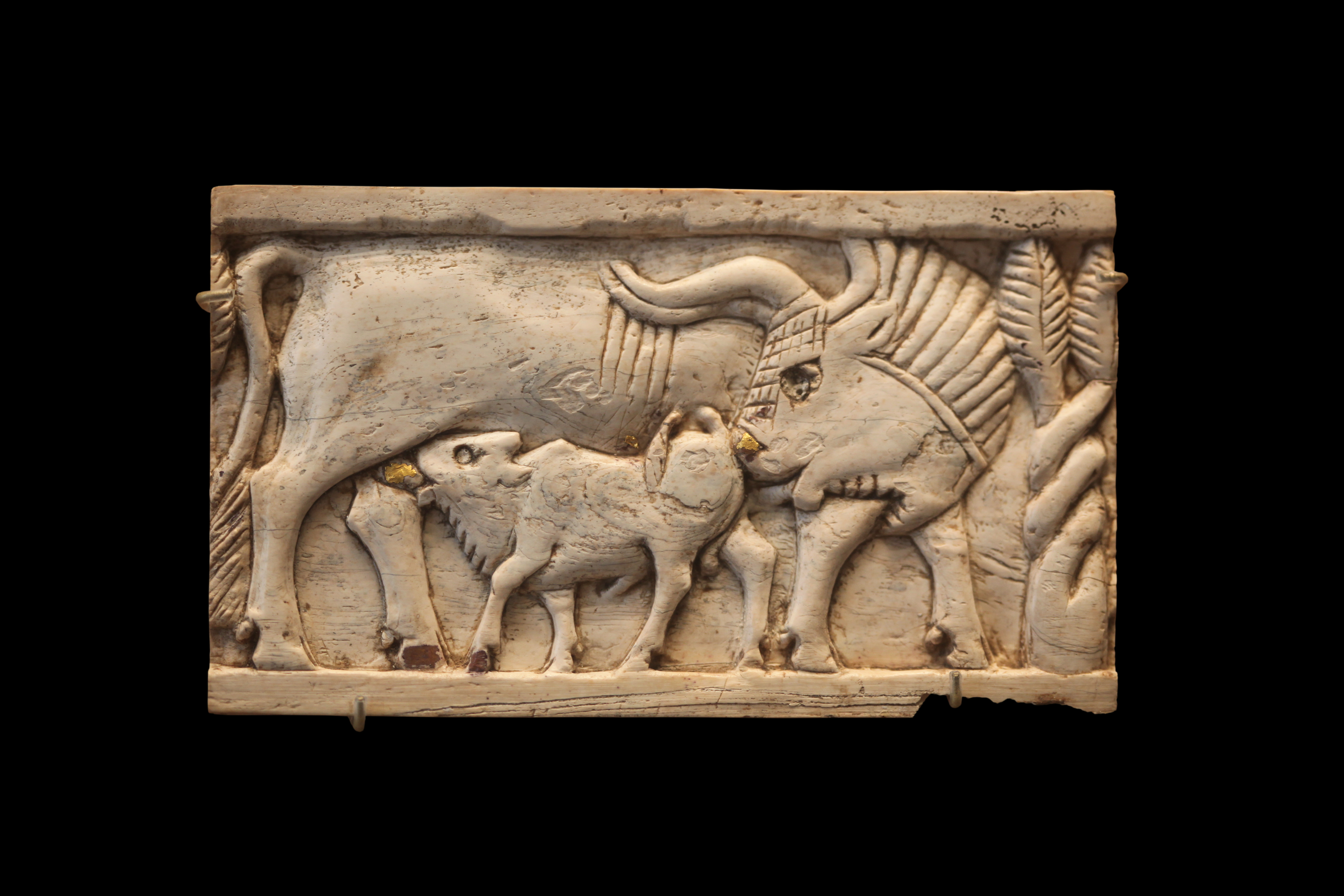
This image was "one of the most popular motifs of the first millennium in Western Asia," but originated earlier still.

The Kuntillet Ajrud inscriptions are a group of ancient Hebrew inscriptions found at the site of Kuntillet Ajrud, in the Sinai Peninsula. They are written on pottery, stone, and plaster; most were written at the site where they were found, while some were sent there on jars, likely from the Jerusalem area. They are dated to the late 9th century BCE. Some of the inscriptions were written on pithoi (large storage jars) that also feature paintings.

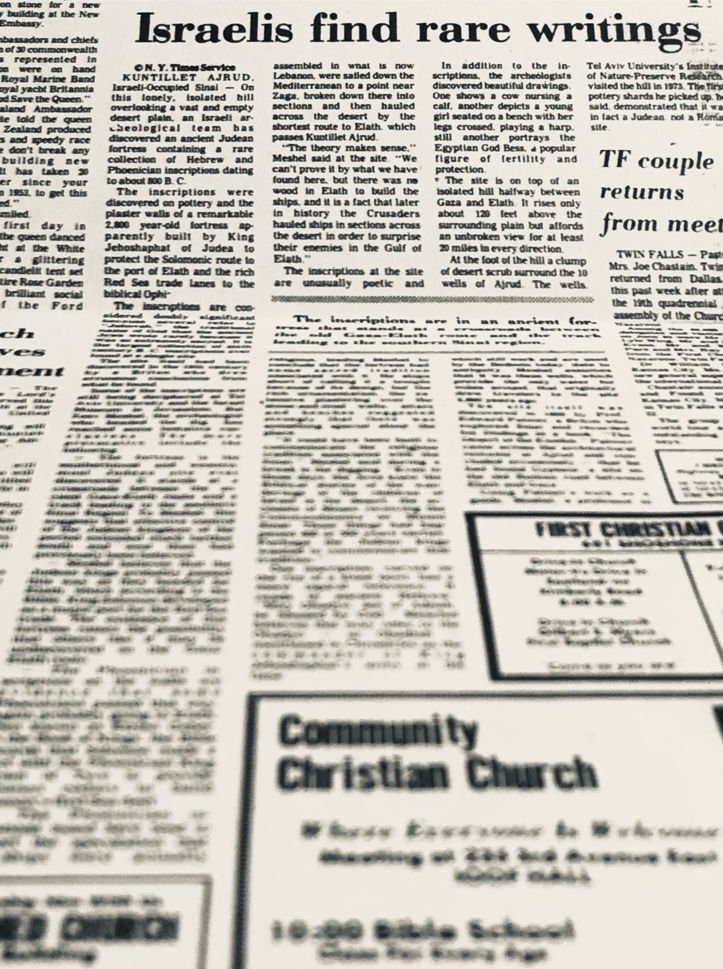
July 9, 1976 "The inscriptions at the site are unusually poetic and religious."

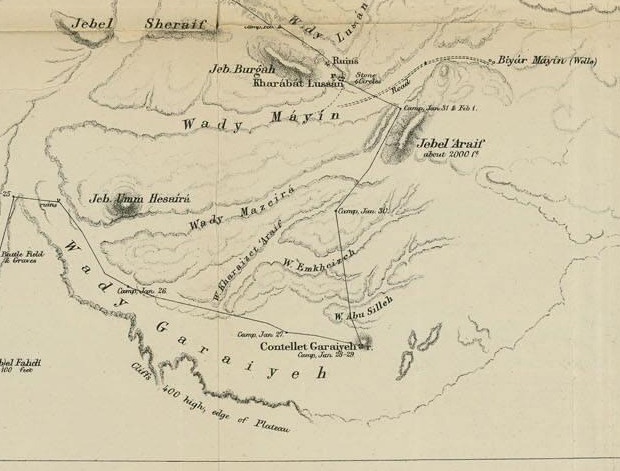
Alternate spellings include Contellet Garaiyeh, here, as well as Kuntilet Quraiyah, Al Kuntillah, simply Kuntilla.

The inscriptions are significant for the study of the history of ancient Israelite religion, as are the paintings found at the site, some of which are located near the inscriptions and may be related to them. The "shocking" and "exceedingly controversial" inscriptions have relevance and interest to the fields of Ancient Near East and Biblical studies. The central figures of Pithos A have been identified as either representations of Yahweh and Asherah, the Egyptian dwarf-god Bes or Bes-like deities, or even as demonic ritual dancers. The figures appear bipedal and wearing hats or crowns.

== Discovery ==
The finds were discovered during excavations in 1975–1976, during the Israeli occupation of the Sinai Peninsula, but were not published in first edition until 2012.

== Description ==
The most famous inscriptions are found on two pithoi, especially Pithos A, obverse pictured. The central figures are human-bovine and have writing above their heads. The lyre player (or weaver), seated and about the same size as the standing figures, bears the same polka dot pattern. The suckling motif (𓃖) with the quadrupedal animals is also quite central, but less mysterious.

Wall inscriptions were written in black and red ink on plaster. At least one piece is a multi-color work. Contributing to difficulty, the "incriptions (sic) reveal odd data at different angles" or photos may mislead.

The reverse of pithos A has a line of ambiguous mammals including most clearly a boar. The remaining below, drawn more confidently, are all goddess symbols: a pair of caprids flanking a sacred tree, on bottom a lion. The central figure:

"It is mainly a tree trunk with branches and shoots coming out from it, eight in flower and eight in bud. Pirhiya Beck notes that the tree may be compared with Phoenician examples which show lotus and bud. Its overall form, however, is curious. The flowers are not quite lotuses. The trunk seems like that of a palm tree, but at the top of the trunk is a feature that looks rather like a large almond nut, with the pits of its shell clearly shown. Interestingly, three main branches come from each side of the trunk, and the other two flowering shoots and two minor budding shoots (or shoots with small almond nuts) come from the ’almond’ motif. Like the menorah, then, this representation of an asherah has three branches coming from each side of a central trunk. As we have seen, in the drawings of the Lachish ewer, the trees shown also have three branches coming from a central trunk and look very like menorot. In the Ta’anach stands, the tree is an upright trunk with several furled fronds coming out from the two sides; in one case six and in the other eight.

Pithos B has figures in a jubilating attitude and other elements. There are a couple half-complete drawings of an archer and plenty of animals, also often incomplete due to artist's or history's caprice.

Dwarfing the other pieces of art is a partial wall painting on (again) white plaster, with black and red paint like the rest, adding yellow. It's a seated figure, with neither breasts nor beard; perhaps a younger male god or prince. A lotus is near or touching his mouth, like the lotus touching the male's face on jar A.

== Inscriptions ==
Series 1 are carved into the tops of stone bowls, one of them quite massive and if made offsite an ordeal to carry. The short carvings on them are translated as mostly light fare like blessings and personal names. Series 2 of inscriptions are carved into pottery before firing. 3 and 4 below are jars and wall plaster.

=== Pithos A ===
Large letters deeply wet-carved into a shoulder of it read 𐤒𐤓, qof-resh or QR. The abundance of text on the same surface as a variety of visual art is unusual and complementary, adding to alphabetic and cultural development understanding.

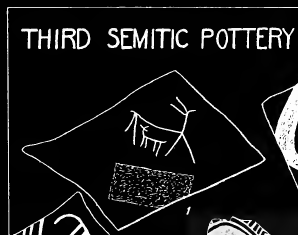

There is a common two-bovine motif. Many have written on a connection to abundance, fertility, goddesses. Meshel says the udders are poorly drawn; others point out it is a bull. The suckling motif is ubiquitous in the ancient world, seen in Syrian ivory, Egyptian hieroglyph, Semitic pottery, and more.

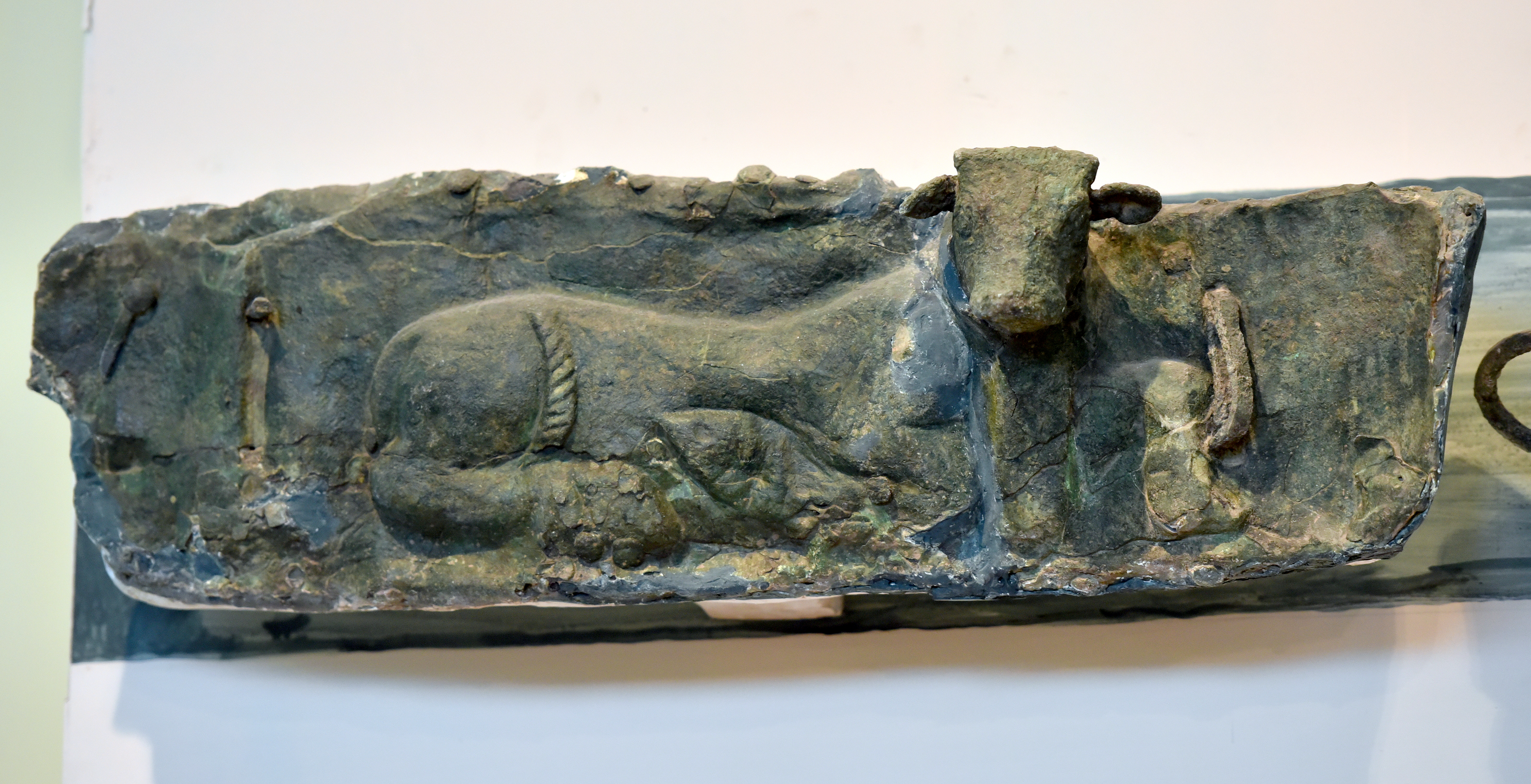
An early interspecies variant from temple of Ninhursag

The seated figure is called a musician or weaver, though she's holding her instrument wrong in either case. The central figures have been identified as either representations of Yahweh and Asherah, the Egyptian dwarf-god Bes or Bes-like deities, or even as demonic ritual dancers. They appear bull-faced or leonine, bipedal, and wearing hats or crowns.

The bipedal figures here and on jar B are shown with energetic polka dots, which Meshel says must be symbolic, ie not clothing. In fact dots are a common motif in Sinai and elsewhere.

==== Meshel 3.1 ====
(1.) ʾmr ʾšyw hm[l]k ʾmr lyhlyw wlywʿšh wl [ ... ] brkt ʾtkm lyhwh šmrn wlʾšrth

"Says ʾAšiyaw the king: Say to Yahēliyaw, and to Yawʾāsah, and to blessed are you all to Yahweh of Samaria and to his Asherah".

=== Pithos B ===
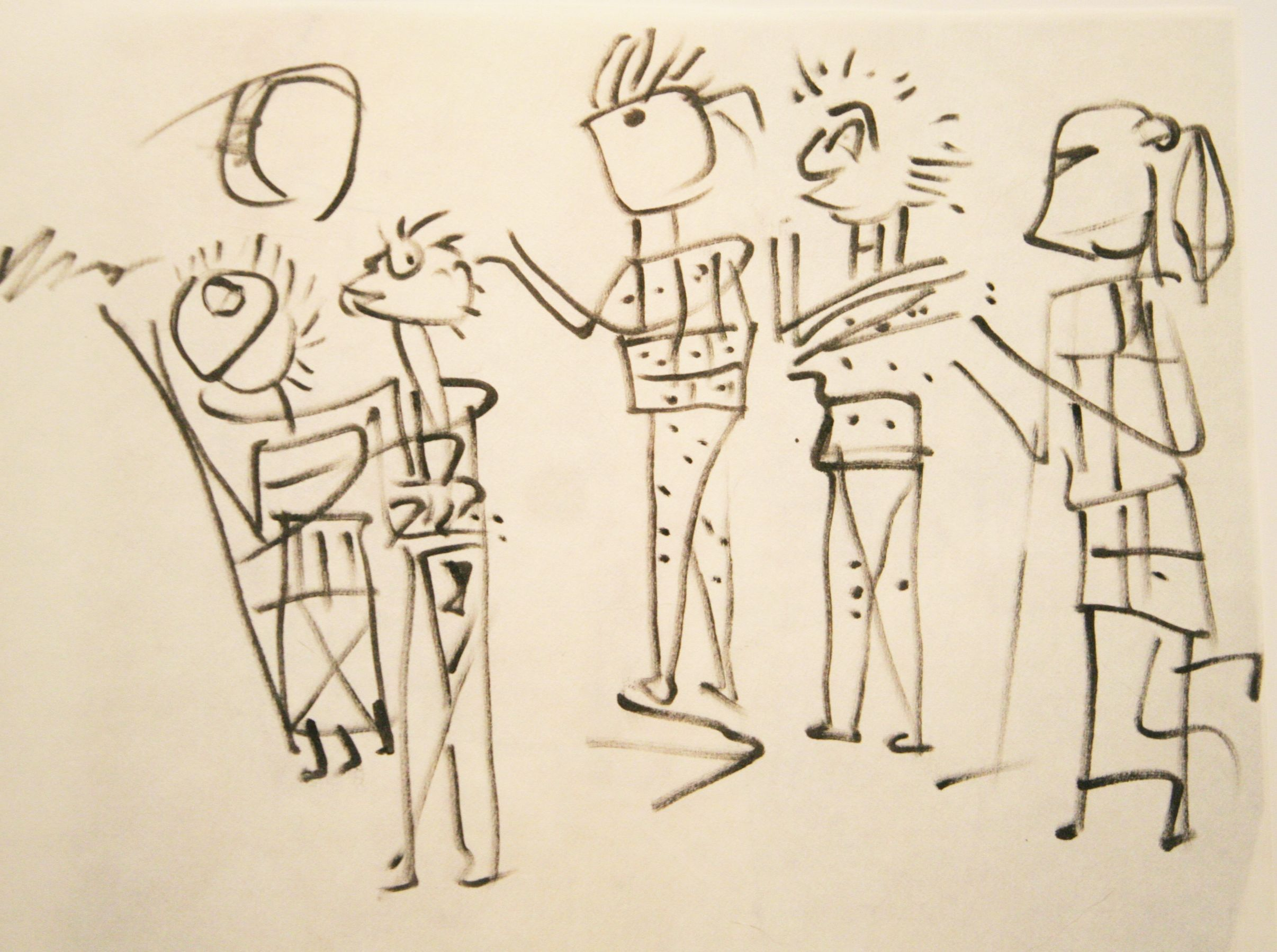
After figs mnopq, the matchstick-armed jubilant are in slightly rectilinear style.

The second jar follows A's unbroken single line of text with many short lines. You can see interpretation of "carriage returns" or breaks within words.

==== Meshel 3.6 ====
(1) ʾmr	(1) Says
(2) ʾmryw ʾ-	(2) ʾAmaryaw: "ʾ-
(3) mrl ʾdny	(3) MRL, my lord,
(4) hšlm ʾt	(4) is all well with you?
(5) brktk ly-	(5) I bless you to Ya-
(6) hwh tmn	(6) hweh of Teman
(7) wlʾšrth yb-	(7) and to his Asherah. May he bl-
(8) rk wyšmrk	(8) ess you and protect you,
(9) wyhy ʿm ʾdn-	(9) and may he be with my lo-
(10) y ʾrk ḥym	(10) rd as a long life
(11) bšlm ʾmr hʾ	(11) in peace." says he.

Lemaire says there's an epistolary character to the text, not just from brk, but a common NW Semitic salutation: ʾmr X ʾmr Y, "Message of X, say to Y," Wearne says ʾmr, from a word for command or speak, is "that which was promised," a votive, not synonymous with ndr an offering; also skeptical about the "wooden" and "redundant" welfare inquiry.

==== Meshel 3.9 ====
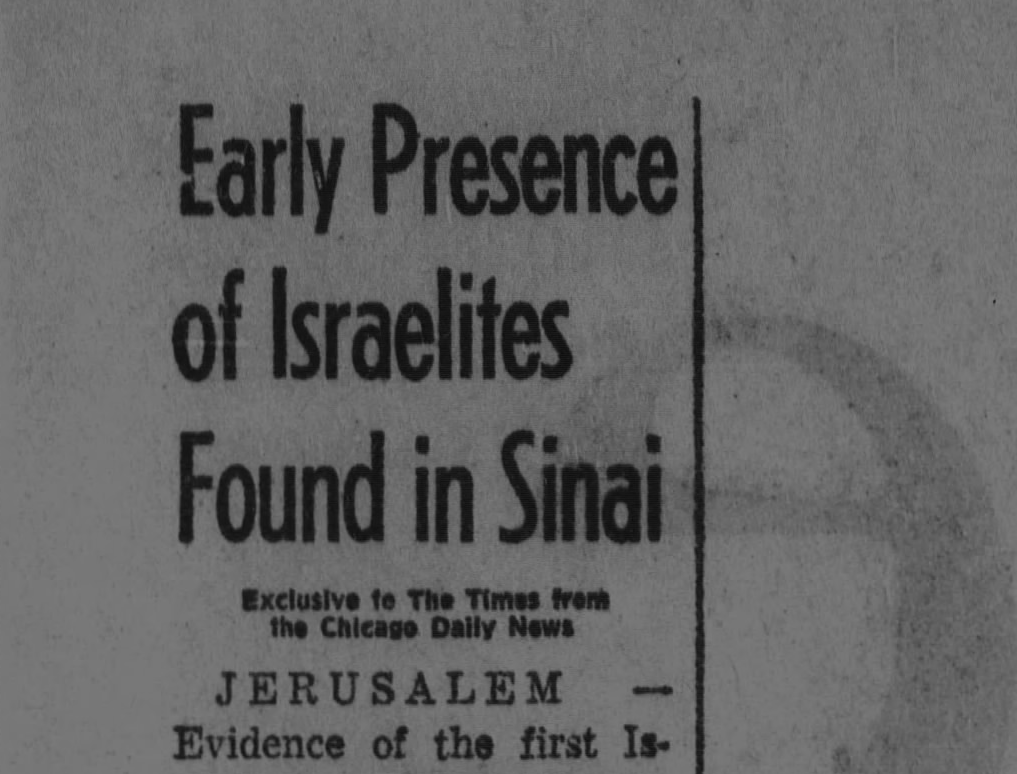

(1) ...lyhwh htmn wlʾšrth
(2) ...kl ʾšr yšʾl mʾš ḥnn h wʾm pth wntn lh yhw[h]
(3) klbbh

(1) ...to Yahweh of the Teman, and to his Asherah,
(2) ...all which he asks from a man he will give generously. And if he entices, Yahwe(h) shall give to him
(3) his wish(es).

==== Pithos C ====
Inscription 3.16, in red. Figs 5.47a,b.

1 ʾšʾ bn...	Asa, son of...
2 htlh...	
3 gd...	Gad
4 d...	

Jar C is a not a whole item, like A and B, it's just a chunk with the container's handle and the beginnings of a few lines. Meshel sees a personal name Asa on line 1 and perhaps "lamb" on line 2.

=== Meshel plaster fragments ===
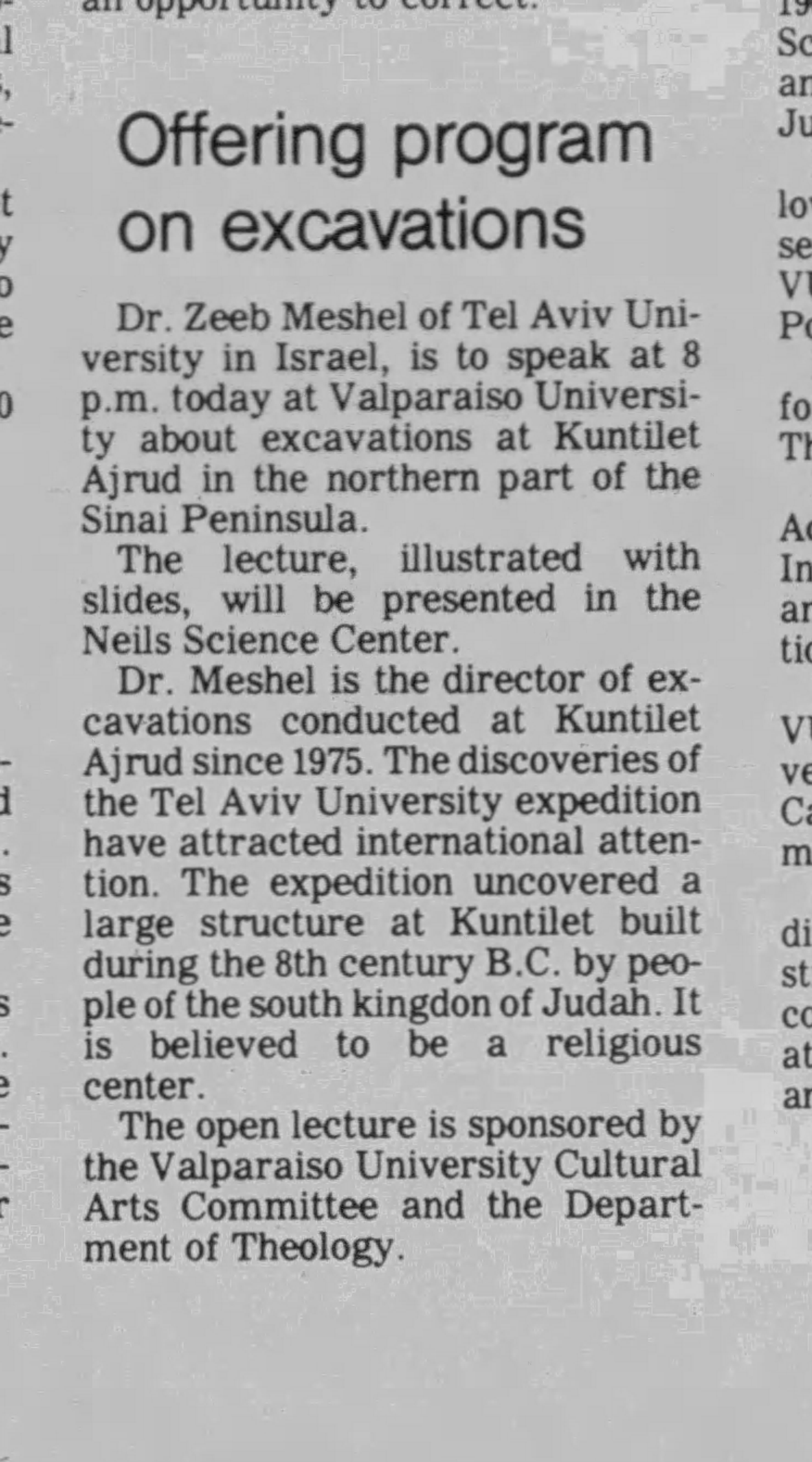

Series 4 of inscriptions were written on white plaster that crumbled due to excavation.

==== Meshel 4.1.1 ====
"Teman" is spelled tymn, as opposed to above tmn. The inclusion of this yodh may indicate diphthongization. However, Frevel has argued against indiscriminate interpretations about "Teman" in references to tmn, tymn, htmn.

1	...ʾrk ymm wyšbʿw [...] ytnw l[y]hwh tymn wlʾšrth	[...may] he lengthen [their] days, and may they be satisfied [...] may they be given to [Ya]hweh of Teman and to his Asherah.
2	...hyṭb yhwh hty[mn...]	...the favored of Yahweh of the Te[man...]

==== Meshel № 4.2 ====
4.2 involves less reconstructional guesswork than the lacuna-heavy 4.1 series as it's in two pieces rather than many. However, it's one of the more debated pieces, with a few translations available.

(1) wbzrḥ ʾl br...
(2) wymsn hrm...
(3) wydkn gbnm...
(4) wšdš ʾly...
(5) lbrk bʿl bym mlḥ[mh...]
(6) lšm ʾl bym mlḥ[mh...]

(1) And when El shone forth in...
(2) and mountains melted...
(3) and peaks were crushed...
(4) (unknown)
(5) to bless Baal on the day of bat[tle...]
(6) to the name of El on the day of bat[tle...]

There has been some scholarly debate on the translation of line 4; some have suggested that the inscription actually reads the more familiar qdš ("holy") rather than wšdš, while others have argued for qdš referring to a placename like Kadesh-Barnea.

==== Meshel 4.3 ====
1	(...)
2	[...ʾ]hly y[šrʾl? ...]
3	lydth · whʾ...
4	[ʿ]ny wʿsq bn ʾbyn ʾ[š] dl...
5	lbšm ywn md(?)w [ng]ʾl bd[m...]
6	nd ḥlp wym [y]bš ʿ(?)d...
7	[ḥ]rn bšnt d[br(?)] r[ʿ]b w[ḥ]rb šḥt qyn š[q]r wmrmh...

English translation in dispute. Meshel doesn't attempt a full translation of the partially "nonsensical" sequence, but guesses Cain or Kenites for qyn (line 7, bold), which can also mean create or acquire or family, as in KTU 1.3 or Genesis 4.1 or the Khirbet el-Qom ostraca. He wasn't the first to mention the Kenites "nesting" in Sinai.

Subseries 4.4 and 4.5 are quite fragmentary, really a collection of one- or two-letter chunks, on one item the letters b... hnb abutting part of a drawing of a human head. The figure appears beardless, with an olive-shaped eye seen in facial profile.

==== Meshel 4.6 ====
===== 4.6.1 =====
2	m[...]m. lʕm šmm
3	ʔmr.[...]ʔtl
4	ʔmryšʔl

Square script transcription uses terminal m ("מ[...]ם. לעם שממ") inconsistently; inscription uses 𐤌 with no sofit alternate.

=== KA series ===
As compiled in the Handbuch der althebräischen Epigraphik by Renz, many of the Kuntillet Ajrud inscriptions featured in the book appear to be fragmented copies of the inscriptions already published by Meshel, as the contents and wording of the inscriptions are otherwise identical.

==== KA 9:2 ====
1	עירא
2	עדה
3	לשר ער

==== KA 9:5 ====
1	חליו

==== KA 9:6 ====
1	[..]ברך:ימם:וישבעו[..]
2	[..]ה יטב:יהוה [..]

KA 9:6 appears to represent a fragmented Meshel 4.1.1.

==== "Fragmente" ====
a	יתנו:ל[..]
b	אשרת[..]

This fragment, like KA 9:6, also appears to belong to the Meshel 4.1.1 inscription.

==== KA 9:7 ====
1	[..]ובזרח:אל:וימסן הרם [..]
2	[..]ברך:בעל:בים:מלח[..]
3	[..]לשם:אל:בים:מלח[..]

KA 9:7 represents a fragmented Meshel 4.2.

==== KA 9:8 ====
1	אמר:א[..] ה [..]ד:אמר:ליהל[..]וליועשה:ו[..] ברכת:אתכם
2	ליהוה: שמרן: ולאשרתה

KA 9:8 represents a fragmented Meshel 3.1.

==== KA 9:9 ====
Pithos 2:

1	אמריו א
2	מר ל: אדני
3	השלם: א[ת]
4	ברכתך לי
5	הו[ה...]
6	ולאשרתה: יב
7	רך: וישמרך
8	ויהי: עם: אדג
9	י[...]
10	כ[...]
11	טיכלמנספעצקר
12	עפצקרשת
13	השערם שערם:
14	כלמנספעצקרש

KA 9:9 reproduces Meshel 3.6 in its entirety. The nonsense after the tiny lines 9–10, however, are abecedaries. The preceding are on the left side of the large streak down the side of the jar, the abecedaries on the right of the same stark line. This is on the reverse of the jar with the smaller figures with their hands up.

==== KA 9:10 ====
Pithos 2: weitere zeichen

1	כל אשר ישאל מאש חנן [אתה..] ונתן לה יהו כלבבה
2	ליהוה: התמן: ולאשרתה

KA 9:10 appears to largely reproduce Meshel 3.9, though the order of the lines is reversed, with Meshel 3.9's first line comprising the second line of KA 9:10, and vice versa.

== First paper ==
"The workers became so enthusiastic with their finds and so wrapped up in their whole endeavor that it became almost impossible to tear them away from their work. As the magnitude of their discoveries became apparent, they nearly had to be dragged away from their trenches when it was time for food or rest."

— The Name of God in the Wilderness of Zin 1976

Being an arid area, much was preserved. The first treks found cloth, rope, and wood. There were even tools made from the wood of a tree that only grows naturally in Southern Sinai. "Archaeology professor talks at N.D.". The South Bend Tribune. 7 December 1978.

In his 1976 publication, Meshel described Kuntillet Ajrud, noting its distinctiveness compared to other sites. A key indicator of its exceptional nature was the abundance of pottery found at the location—they found more than they could carry almost immediately. Meshel, along with Carol Meyers, attributed this site's significance to its strategic position near major thoroughfares connecting important ancient locales. The site yielded five categories of inscriptions and artifacts:

1. Pottery fragments bearing single letters, inscribed prior to firing.
2. Pottery with inscriptions incised post-firing — "They are not ostraca."
3. Stone vessels featuring incised inscriptions.
4. Wall plaster inscriptions, four examples.
5. Inscriptions found on complete storage jars, two.

The paper says that the Kuntillet findings débuted (Nov 30 1975) at the home of the President of Israel. But the first edition was still decades in the future. This publishing delay led to complaints.

== Interpretation ==
The references to Samaria, capital of the Kingdom of Israel (Samaria), and to Teman suggest that Yahweh had a temple in Samaria, while raising questions about the relationship between Yahweh and Qos, the national god of Edom. Such questions had previously been raised due to the Tanakh's apparent reluctance to name the deity. Personal name Qošyaw may even equate the two. More important than the minor god has been discussion over the consort relationship of the two main figures, which has been voluminous.

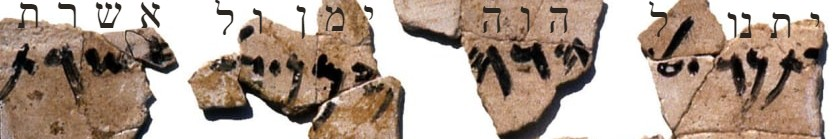
Kuntillet Ajrud

=== Grammar ===
The final h on the construction yhwh šmrn w'šrth is "his" in "Yahweh and his Asherah." This is well-attested earlier but unusual in Biblical use with personal or divine names, raising the possibility that "Asherah" refers to some cultic object rather than a deity. Erhard Blum argues that since the Hebrew phrase corresponds to the regular construction of two nomina regentia with one genitive, it should be translated as "and the ashera of Yahweh." Zevit suggests *’Ašerātā as a "double feminization." Reuven Chaim Klein argues that w'šrth means "and His temple/shrine/site," following an obscure usage of the Hebrew root ʿšr and its Aramaic cognate ʿtr. Handbuch describes the endings of the words as reflecting inconsistent use of sofit plene among defective spelling, or the reverse.

Josef Tropper's onomastic tetragrammaton reconstructions show that YHWH ends with -a or -ú, depending on its position in names. He thinks the final -a in Hebrew might signify an absolutive case ending, marked by 'he' as a mater lectionis, notwithstanding common wisdom that makes a suffix impossible. Adding an 'h' would then turn the preexisting 'h' to a 't' in ’šrth when this applied to ’šrh." This closes the line of argumentation of this investigation which started with syllabically attested Jewish personal names of the Late Babylonian period with formation element ia-a-wa^{6}: the Israelite divine name “Yahwe” is of a nominal nature (qatl-pattern). Its ending-less basic form is *yahw (> yahû). Alongside this existed a name-form with a preserved case ending -a, namely *yahwa, on which Tetragrammaton-writing is based. Thus Tropper loses the "his," and we have simply "...Yahweh and Asherah" written in the blessings. Yoel Elitzur proposed a further simplifying framework where the era's orthography used expanded or contracted spelling not following different grammatical rules under different influence systems, but more or less when the scriptors felt like it.

==== Alphabetic development ====
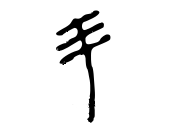

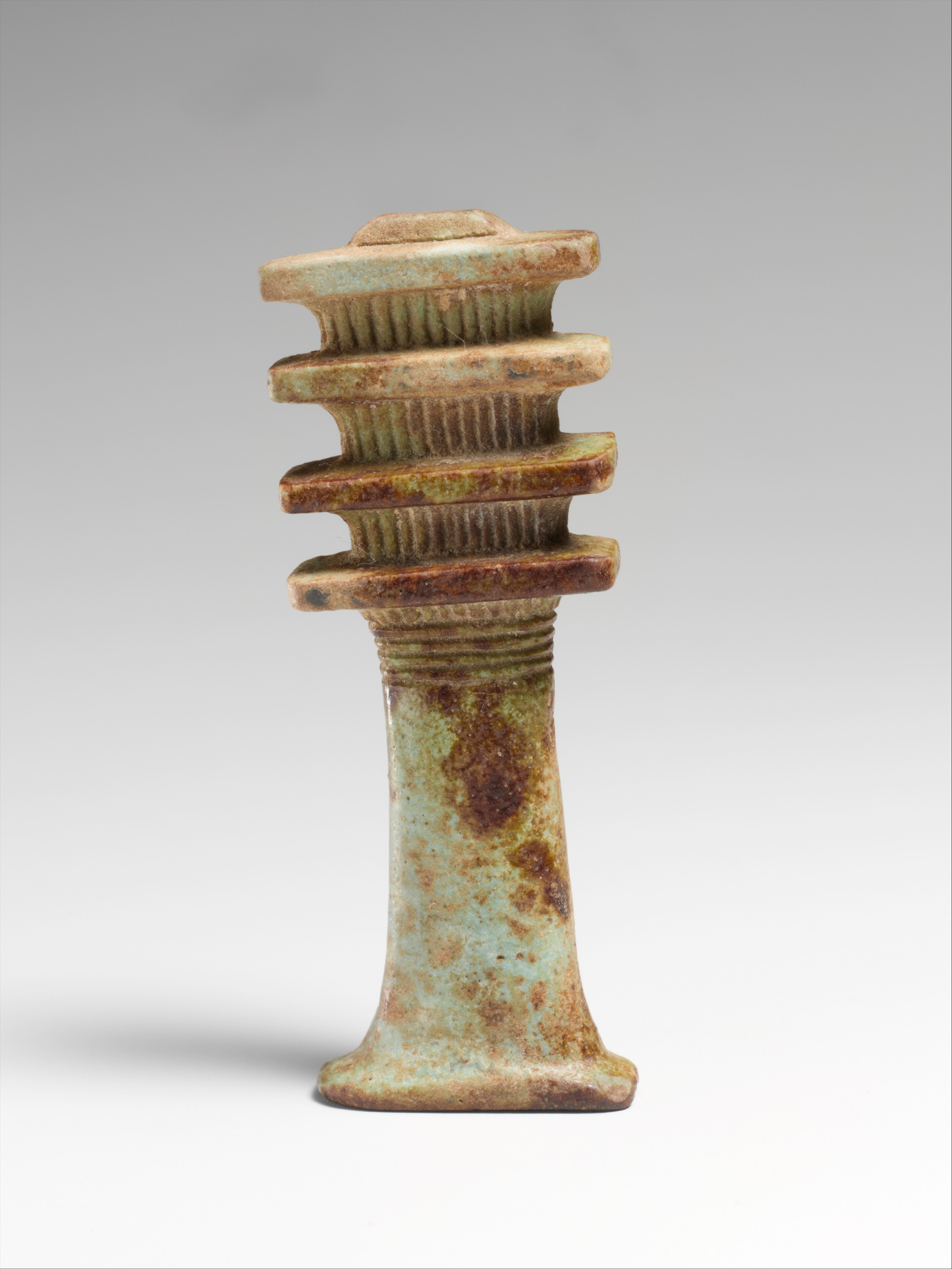
Djed ivory

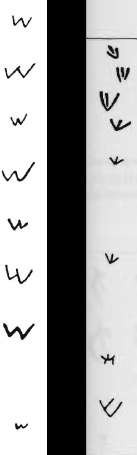
Various forms of the Paleo-Hebrew letter šin (𐤔).

Phoenician, proto-Sinaitic, Kuntillet Ajrud.

The inscriptions are good examples of a script mid-development. Part shows an ayin without a dot hugging a yod, together constituting what could be confused for an ayin alone in an earlier, more ocular form. At least some of the shins (𐤔 not ש) and sameks (𐤎, a support pillar shown in djed style) reflect the Paleo-Hebrew conception of the letters.

The inscriptions testify to the high literacy level among their writers, and even the "doodles" speak of calligraphic sophistication. Making comparison to the ancient and canonical Song of Deborah, Ahituv 2014 elevates them to the "oldest known Hebrew poem" caught quoting a theophany that predates its scriptor.

=== Teman and Samaria ===
The localized Yahweh, "of" Samaria and Teman is unseen in the canon but follows familiar patterns, Ahituv 2014 finds this expected. Nadav Na'aman also follows Meshel's interpretation of Samaria and Teman, a few scholars differ.

=== Location ===
The Kuntillet area was on the Gaza Road, a major informal highway, nearer Kadesh Barnea and Elath – (gulf of) Aqaba to the south. Nearby names on the map include Jebel al Qunna, Esh Sha'Ira, J. El Yahamum, Har Timna, Har Uziyahu, Har Argaman, Har Tsenefim, Har Dela'at, J. El 'Aneiqa.

=== Context ===
The location was in use only for a short period. Evidence of everyday activities included loom weights and faunal remains; perhaps less everyday activities were indicated by linen-wool mixed fabrics "normally prohibited to all but religious officials." Plaster surfaces were everywhere. There were ovens and container forms (jars, bowls, lamps, flasks) most undecorated and imported. There were no sickle blades (low cereal activity) but there was a high ratio of imported fish. It appears the location was provisioned entirely from outside. However, the surrounding area's pottery style isn't seen at the site, implying uneasy relations with the closest neighbours. In other words, it seemed visitors were from far, not near, and brought wealth.

The main room in building A contained benches, like the space where the Deir Alla inscription was found, among other parallels between the two. Meshel said in the book's title it was a religious site. Some said the sacred art indicated a temple. Some said the lack of evidence of cultic activity meant it had been a mere caravanserei, like an Iron Age truck stop. (That is, they found no carbonic traces of burned sacrifice, which is considered the sine qua non of old Northwest Semitic cultic activity.)

Lissovsky pointed out that sacred trees (typically) leave nothing to archaeology. Meshel imagines the nearby tree grove increased the sanctity of the area, a bamah or "high place" may have been in Building B, and four massebot-like cultic stones that were found in Building A might reveal a cultic nature of the site.

==== Selected species ====
Diverse remains show that people brought goods from distant locations.

Species	Common name	Origin
Glycymeris inscubria		Mediterranean Sea
Stramonita haemastoma	Florida dog winkle	Mediterranean Sea
Lambis truncata sebae	Seba's spider conch	Red Sea
Monetaria moneta		Red Sea
Lates niloticus	Nile Perch	Nile River Basin

==== Bench room ====
Meshel called in narrow and elongated building A the "bench room." It featured stone benches occupying most of its space. Among them some were plain stone, some plastered white, and some had decorated plaster. A straight strip of unfurnished floor afforded central perambulation. A pair of facing benches have footrests.

The pithoi were found among over 1,000 Judean pillar figurines, in spaces with graphic walls. One of the wall pieces is significantly larger than the other art at the site:

"Pirhiya Beck, in her lengthy analysis of Horvat Teman's finds, described this wall painting on plaster in some detail. The surviving fragments preserve the profile of a human head facing right with an eye and ear(?) all drawn in red outline, the eyeball and hair rendered in black, and a red object with black markings which Beck identified as a lotus blossom, concealing the mouth of the human figure. Additional plaster fragments show the figure dressed in a yellow garment with a red neckline border and a double collar-band drawn in red and encasing rows of black dots. Also discernable is a chair with a garment depicted in elaborate arrays of color (yellow, black, and red), part of the chair’s frame, pomegranates, and an unidentifiable plant. Beck pointed out that the size of the scene is impressive measuring some 32 cm in height, by far the largest mural at the site. She also speculated that these fragments are remnants of a larger scene that may have included several human figures participating in some type of ceremony with various plants in the background.12... Two installations located along the northern wall of building A’s courtyard can be interpreted as additional evidence for the observance of sacred ritual within the court yard..."

Pieces of these walls were picked up from the floor to reconstruct the plaster fragments above; only one was still in situ in the strict sense clinging to the wall on which it was written, 4.3 above.

=== Dating ===
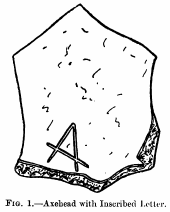
In his 19th century look at the same site, Palmer said that Syrian-Palestinian potters habitually used the most ancient trade-marks, and mentioned an aleph sherd like Meshel found a few of. Above, Ras Macalister found similar in Gezer.

Lily Singer-Avitz defends a date around the late 8th century; that is rather near the fall of Samaria in 722 BCE. William M. Schniedewind argues that the oldest inscriptions may date as early as the late-10th century. Meshel et al (1995) had suggested circa 801, finding carbon dating to support some primary evidence that pointed that way. Through the decades, Meshel's dating estimates as site archaeologist have remained consistent. The author proposes it was a wayside shrine lying between important destinations like Elat, Ezion-Geber, Kadesh Barnea. Meshel has always emphasized the nature of the site as religious, without defining or adopting decisive descriptors like sanctuary. The question of if it was an "official religious site" may be subtle, as writers tend to argue it was indeed both and mention separately as an "official site" and a religious site.

== Phallus misstep ==
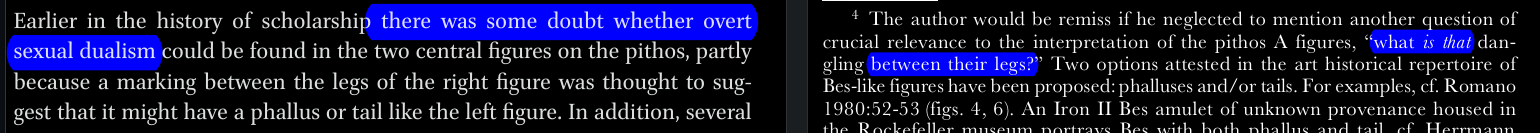
Scholarly confusion

Until 2023, illustrations added a penis and testes to the smaller and breasted biped on pithos A. When publicity called this matching pair to note, citizens asked if this were a depiction of a gay god. Reporter Nir Hasson interviewed the author of the editio princeps:

"One day archaeologist Uzi Avner called me and told me that he was looking at the exhibits at the Israel Museum and that he thinks the smaller figure has nothing between its legs. We rushed to the museum and they opened the display case for us. We had the Israel Museum restorer with us, who promised me that he had gentle hands, and with a light brush he cleaned it and it turned out that there was nothing [there]. Since then we have been careful to draw the picture with one figure with and one without. This made it easier for those claiming that they were male and female."

— Ze'ev Meshel, archaeologist

== See also ==
- Lachish ewer
- Kuntillet Ajrud
- Khirbet el-Qom – similar and roughly contemporary inscriptions
- Deir Alla Inscription
- Maqam (shrine)

== Bibliography ==
=== Meshel ===
"Sinai" 2000 precedes but is understood to comprise part I of a greater work, the 2012 editio princeps being its Volume II. "Zin" 1976 is available online and still primary for contextual understanding of the site.

- Meshel, Ze'ev; Meyers, Carol (1976). "The Name of God in the Wilderness of Zin". The Biblical Archaeologist. 39 (1). The American Schools of Oriental Research: 6–10. doi:10.2307/3209411. ISSN 0006-0895. JSTOR 3209411. S2CID 132002593.
- Gunneweg, Jan; Perlman, Isadore; Meshel, Zeev (1985). "The Origin of the Pottery of Kuntillet 'Ajrud". Israel Exploration Journal. 35 (4). Israel Exploration Society: 270–283. ISSN 0021-2059. JSTOR 27926000.
- Meshel, Zeev; Carmi, Israel; Segal, Dror (1995). "14C Dating of an Israelite Biblical Site at Kuntillet Ajrud (Horvat Teman)". Radiocarbon. 37 (2). Cambridge University Press: 205–212. Bibcode:1995Radcb..37..205M. doi:10.1017/S0033822200030654. ISSN 0033-8222.
- Meshel, Zeev (2000). Sinai. Oxford: British Archaeological Reports Limited. ISBN 978-1-84171-077-8.
- Meshel, Z.; Ben-Ami, D.; Aḥituv, S.; Freud, L.; Sandhaus, D.; Kuper-Blau, T. (2012). "Chapter 5: The Inscriptions". Kuntillet ʻAjrud (Ḥorvat Teman): An Iron Age II Religious Site on the Judah-Sinai Border. Hazor. Israel Exploration Society. ISBN 978-965-221-088-3.

=== Further scholarship ===
- Ahituv, Shmuel (2014). "Notes on the Kuntillet 'Ajrud Inscriptions". In Eshel, Esther; Levin, Yigal (eds.). "See, I will bring a scroll recounting what befell me" (Ps 40:8): Epigraphy and Daily Life from the Bible to the Talmud. Vandenhoeck & Ruprecht. pp. 29–38. ISBN 978-3-647-55062-6.
- Blum, Erhard (2021). "Kuntillet 'Ajrud 4.1: New Reconstructions and Readings". Eretz-Israel: Archaeological, Historical and Geographical Studies. 34: 10*–20*. ISSN 0071-108X. JSTOR 27165955.
- Choi, G. (2016). "The Samarian Syncretic Yahwism and the Religious Center of Kuntillet ʿAjrud". In Ganor, Saar; Kreimerman, Igor; Streit, Katharina; Mumcuoglu, Madeleine (eds.). From Shaʿar Hagolan to Shaaraim: Essays in Honor of Prof. Yosef Garfinkel. Israel Exploration Society. ISBN 978-965-221-111-8.
- Krause, Joachim J. (2017). "Kuntillet ʿAjrud Inscription 4.3: A Note on the Alleged Exodus Tradition". Vetus Testamentum. 67 (3). Brill: 485–490. doi:10.1163/15685330-12341286. ISSN 0042-4935. JSTOR 26566694.
- Lewis, Theodore J. (2022). "A Holy Warrior at Kuntillet ʿAjrud? Kuntillet ʿAjrud Plaster Inscription 4.2". In Rollston, Christopher A.; Garfein, Susanna; Walls, Neal H. (eds.). Biblical and Ancient Near Eastern Studies in Honor of P. Kyle McCarter Jr. SBL Press. ISBN 978-1-62837-405-6.
- Mastin, B. A. (2009). "The Inscriptions Written on Plaster at Kuntillet 'Ajrud". Vetus Testamentum. 59 (1). Brill: 99–115. doi:10.1163/156853308X377842. ISSN 0042-4935. JSTOR 20699919.
- Na'aman, Nadav; Lissovsky, Nurit (2008). "Kuntillet 'Ajrud, Sacred Trees and the Asherah". Tel Aviv: Journal of the Institute of Archaeology of Tel Aviv University. 35 (2): 186–208. doi:10.1179/tav.2008.2008.2.186. ISSN 0334-4355. S2CID 161714525.
- Na’aman, Nadav (2017). "In Search of the Temples of YHWH of Samaria and YHWH of Teman". Journal of Ancient Near Eastern Religions. 17 (1): 76–95. doi:10.1163/15692124-12341287. ISSN 1569-2116. S2CID 164931990.
- Puech, Émile (2014). "Les inscriptions hébraïques de Kuntillet 'Ajrud (Sinaï)". Revue Biblique. 121 (2): 161–194. doi:10.2143/RBI.121.2.3157150. ISSN 2466-8583. JSTOR 44092490.
- Renz, Johannes; Röllig, Wolfgang (2016). Handbuch der althebräischen Epigraphik (in German). Darmstadt: WBG (Wissenschaftliche Buchgesellschaft). ISBN 978-3-534-26789-7.
- Stuckey, Johanna H. (2002). "The Great Goddesses of the Levant". Journal for the Study of Egyptian Antiquities. 29: 28–57.
- Taylor, Joan E. (1995). "The Asherah, the Menorah and the Sacred Tree". Journal for the Study of the Old Testament. 20 (66). SAGE Publications: 29–54. doi:10.1177/030908929502006602. ISSN 0309-0892. S2CID 170422840.
- Thomas, Ryan (2016-12-15). "The Identity of the Standing Figures on Pithos A from Kuntillet ʿAjrud: A Reassessment". Journal of Ancient Near Eastern Religions. 16 (2): 121–191. doi:10.1163/15692124-12341282. ISSN 1569-2116.
- Wearne, Gareth James (2015). The plaster texts from Kuntillet ʻAjrud and Deir ʻAlla : an inductive approach to the emergence of northwest Semitic literary texts in the first millennium B.C.E. (Thesis). Macquarie University. doi:10.25949/19435436.V1.
- Wearne, Gareth J. (2023). "Votive Offerings, Graffiti, or Scribal Exercises?: A Note on the grmlqr[t] Inscription from Sarepta and the "Blessings" from Kuntillet ʿAjrud". Vetus Testamentum. 73 (1): 139–154. doi:10.1163/15685330-bja10080. ISSN 0042-4935.
- Zevit, Ziony (1984). "The Khirbet el-Qôm Inscription Mentioning a Goddess". Bulletin of the American Schools of Oriental Research (255). American Schools of Oriental Research: 39–47. doi:10.2307/1357074. ISSN 0003-097X. JSTOR 1357074. S2CID 163562992.
