= Minoan Snake Tube =

Artifact from the Minoan civilization

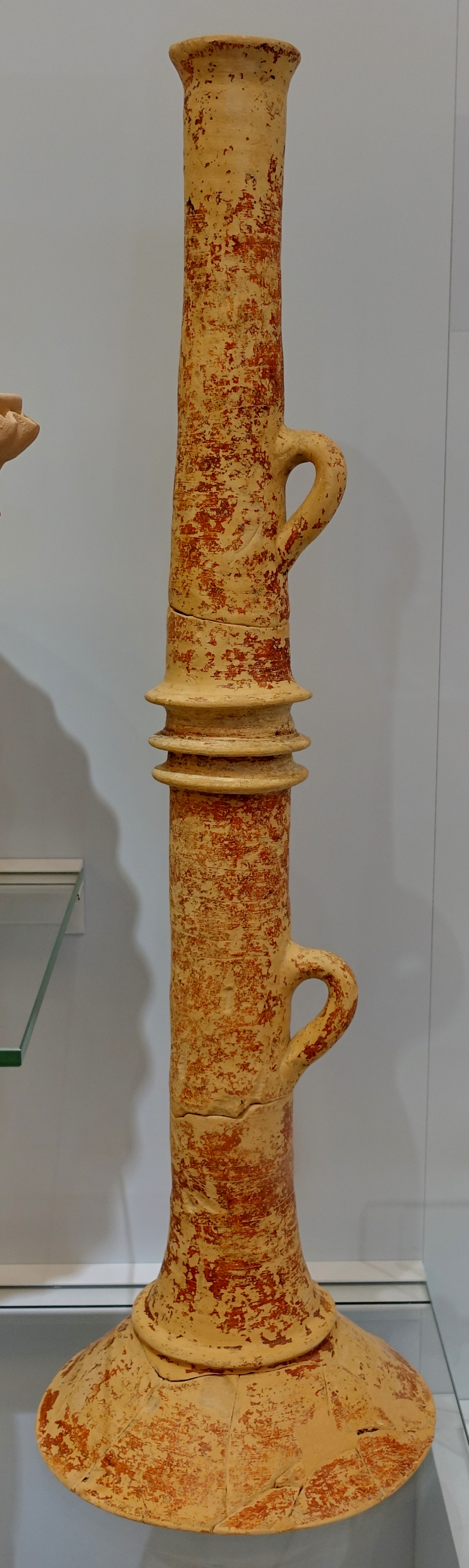
Neopalatial tube from Kato Symi.

Minoan snake tubes are cylindrical ceramic tubes with a closed, splayed out bottom. Sir Arthur Evans interpreted them as "snake tubes", that is vessels for carrying or housing snakes used in Minoan religion. They are now usually interpreted as "offering stands", on which kalathoi, or offering bowls, were placed in shrines. They are described as varying in material and construction despite sharing a common purpose. In the context of domestic shrines snake tubes are believed to have sat on top of or adjacent to a cult bench. In between the tubes would have been a goddess figurine and plaque which featured animal depictions.

Generally the tubes feature rings on the bottom and tops varying in number by location. All the tubes have open tops. The most distinguishable feature of snake tubes are their serpentine like handles. Despite their name not all Minoan snake tubes feature snakes. Minoan snake tubes were originally named by archaeologist Arthur Evans. Evans discovered the snake tubes in 1901 and hypothesized that early Minoans worshipped a snake god or goddess based on only two tubes he had discovered. This theory has however received pushback from contemporary archaeologists who have discovered more tubes without the snakes. Later discoveries found the tubes in close proximity to statues of goddesses believed to have been worshipped by early Minoans. Dating snake tubes can be inexact but scholars estimate them to have been created around 1700 BC. Modern scholars, such as Geraldine Gesell, argue that snake tubes played an important role in the construction and function of early Minoan domestic shrines.

== Minoan religion ==
Due to a lack of evidence, archaeologists have been left with many unanswered questions on Minoan religion. Understanding ritual practice in Minoan Crete has been made particularly difficult due to a lack of monumental temples. Despite this, archaeologists have noted a large amount of ritual evidence in the form of natural sanctuaries and votives. Identifying gods and goddesses have proven rather difficult for scholars. Experts argue that the central figure in Minoan religion was a nature goddess. Scholars again find difficulty in determining if there were a variety of goddesses. This is because figurines in the archaeological record are relatively plain and vary little in design. Whilst, references to goddesses are most frequently found, there is evidence of male figures depicted as gods in Minoan culture. However, scholars debate the importance of gods in Minoan worship.

=== Shrines and sanctuaries ===
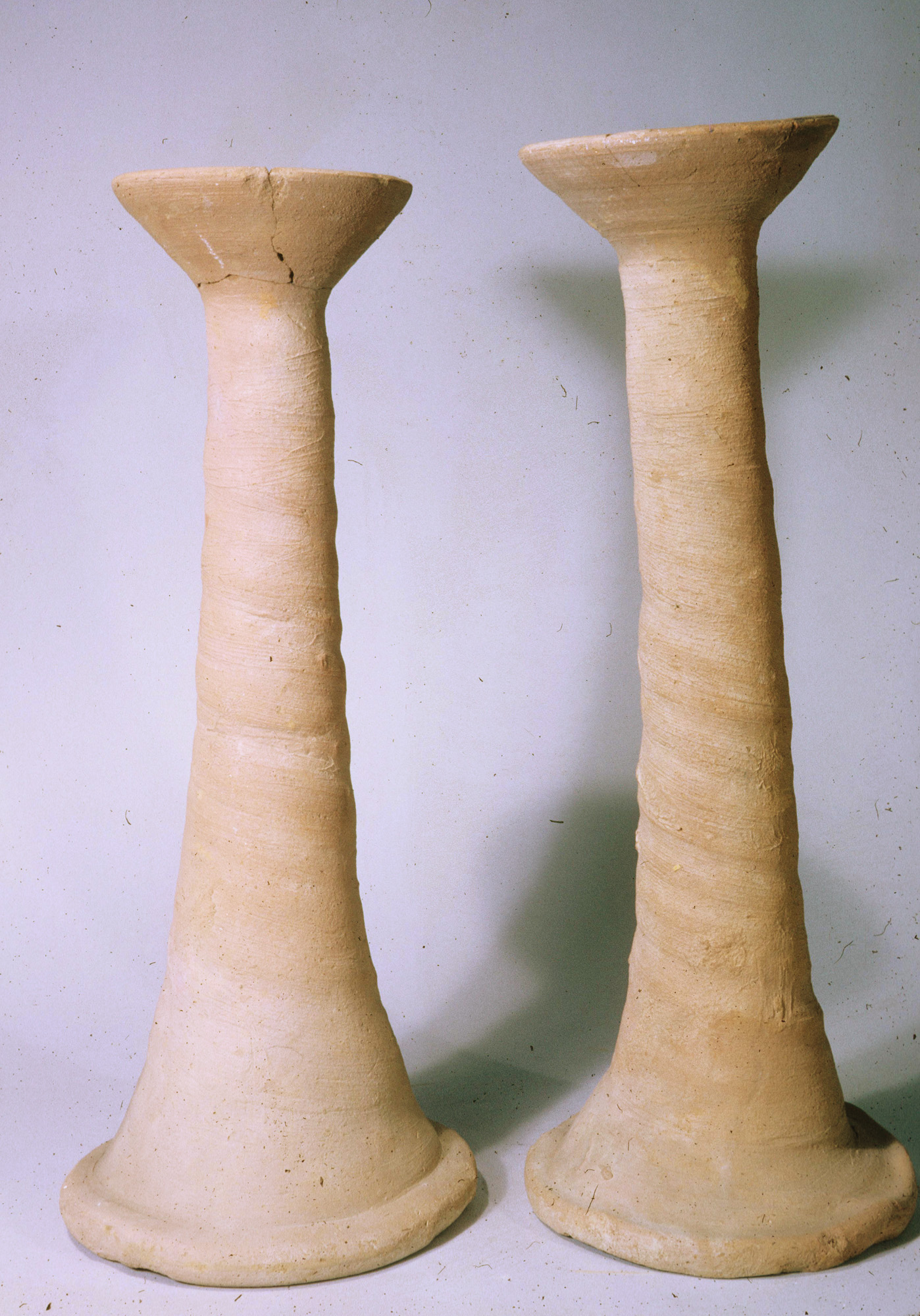
Ancient Egyptian offering stand, approx 2000 BC

Minoans on Crete may have carried out rituals in number of locations. Scholars have been able to confirm evidence of worship on mountain and hill top peak sanctuaries. Although it should be noted, there is evidence of Minoan snake tubes being used at peak sanctuaries. The snake tubes most commonly appear in what archaeologists describe as domestic shrines. These shrines have been found in several archaeological sites throughout Crete. The shrines share some common characteristics such as snake tubes, a bench, and figurines with upraised arms believed to be a depiction of a Minoan goddess. Although some scholars raise questions as to why there are so few of these domestic shrines in Minoan settlements. Scholars argue that if this religion was common to Minoans that the majority of living spaces would have a shrine or evidence of personal worship.

=== Ritual ===
Scholars of ancient Minoan religion develop their theories from evidence in archeological finds such as signet rings, seals, paintings, and pottery vessels. Objects such as the Hagia Triada Sarcophagus depict Minoan burial rituals. Minoan seals depict a variety of religious motifs and possible rituals. Discoveries from the palace at Knossos have led some to infer that Minoans often participating in ritual feasting and drinking. Additionally, pottery vessels from these excavations may have been used in animal sacrifices or other forms of ritual pouring. This suggests a more public aspect of Minoan religion and may support theories of public shrines. Further evidence of public shrines come from snake tubes found at Kommos.

== Materials and design ==
=== Materials ===
There seems to be no standardized construction for the snake tubes across the island. The tubes have varied in both size and types of clay used to construct the objects. Some excavation sites at Kavousi even have multiple sets of snake tubes consisting of different clays. Archeologists analyzing the site argue that different types of clay would correspond to a matching set of a goddess figurines and plaques. This would indicate that the colors or materials would have been associated with specific goddesses within the religion.

=== Designs ===
While it is true the original snake tubes, found by Sir Arthur Evans, had snake like handles; Minoan snake tubes have been found stylized in number of different ways. The tube itself is features a solid and splayed out bottom decorated with rings, and an open top. Evidence suggests that the tubes could have been painted, one such example would be from an excavation in Kavousi. These tubes were painted black and featured designs of octopus tentacles. Scholars from these excavations argue that the color of tubes could be linked to certain idols or goddesses. Other tubes include common symbols in minoan religion such as horns of consecration.

=== Animal iconography ===
More recent excavations have revealed that snake tubes feature multiple other animal imagery symbolic to Minoan religion. These images would have been painted onto the tubes themselves. Excavations from Kavousi discovered snake tubes featuring the following: Snakes, birds, a bull's head, an agrimi, and horns of consecration. The use of symbolic animals, such as a bull and a bird appear in different mediums of art throughout Minoan Crete. The bull was associated with horns of consecration, and is significant as it was probably a sacrificial animal. Scholars argue that the bird symbolizes a goddess similar to how snake illustrations may operate.

== Dating snake tubes ==
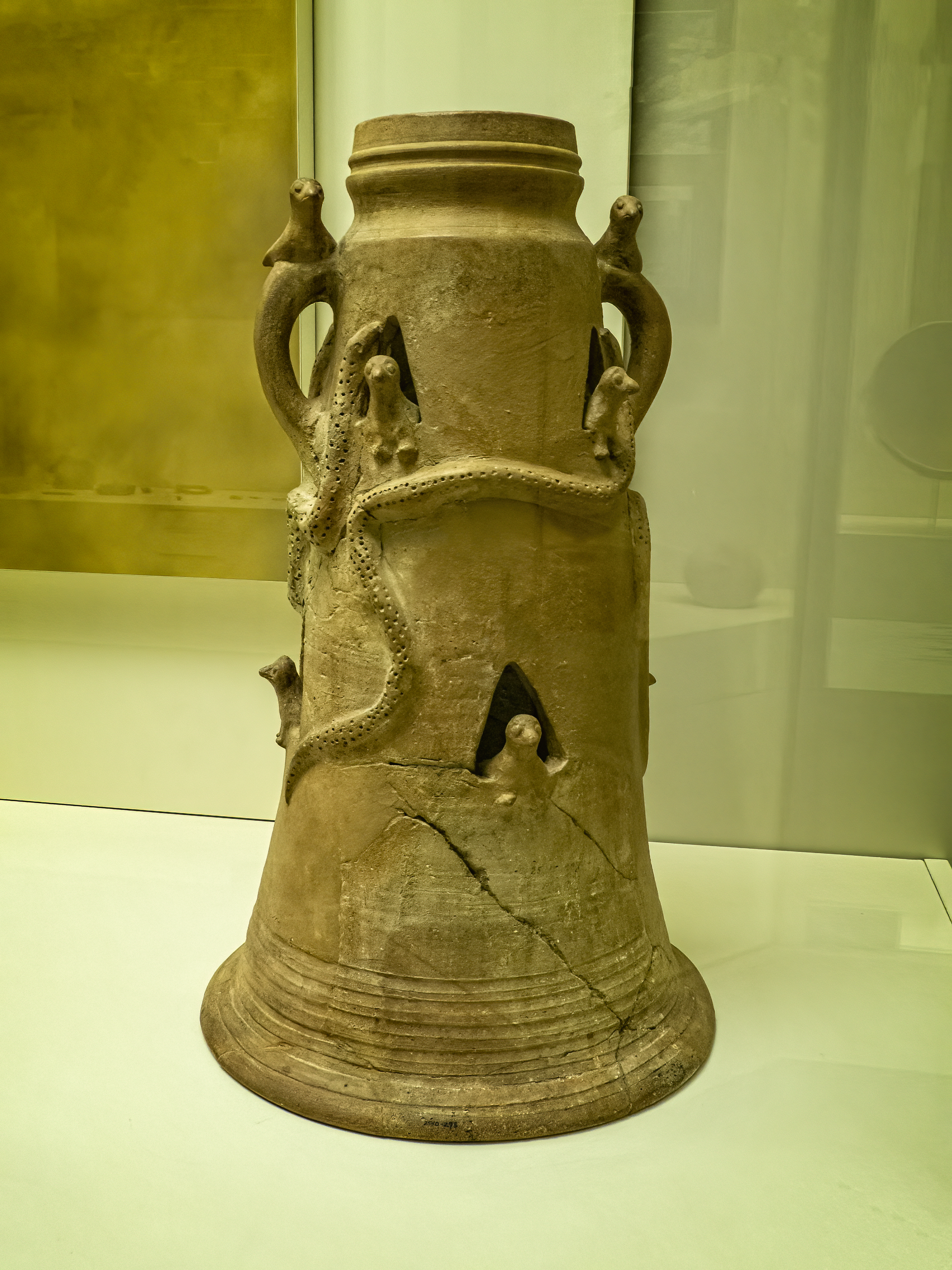
Levantine offering-stand, Beth Shean, c. 1150-1000 BC

Minoan civilization archaeologists generally use Minoan chronology to provide context on estimated dates. This system was first created by Arthur Evans and has since evolved. Three broad categories are typically used Early Minoan (EM), Middle Minoan (MM), and Late Minoan(LM). These three then have further subdivisions. When it comes to Minoan snake tubes, the earliest tubes that can be definitely dated appear to be constructed during the MM period, or 2200-1600 BCE. The majority of snake tubes discovered thus far appear to originate from the LM III period, or 1400-1050 BCE. During these excavation archeologists oftentimes find a significant difference between the date of the objects and the structures they were found in. This could mean that Minoans repurposed buildings frequently or perhaps used them as continuous places of worship.

== Archaeological sites ==
Minoan snake tubes have been found in a number of locations throughout Crete. They were originally discovered at an excavation in Prinias. Sir Arthur Evans also discovered the tubes at Crete's most famous archeological site, Knossos. Other excavations have discovered tubes at sites in Gournia, Koumassa, Kavousi, Gazi, Kannia, Myrtos, Haghida Triada, Kommos Kharpi, Katsamba, and Kephala Khondrou. The variety of sites that snake tubes have been discovered at suggests that the objects were important to shrine construction and ritual practice as opposed to theories that describe them as decorative pieces.

== Possible Uses of Minoan Snake Tubes ==
There are several arguments for how Minoan Snake Tubes were used. When Arthur Evans originally named snake tubes he did so believing they were connected to snake worship. He noted that the opening in tube may have been used as place to contain snakes used in rituals. Other early archeologists believed that the tubes were early models of a Minoan goddess. Others have suggested that the snake tubes were served as libation vessels allowing for ritual drinking and pouring. One scholar suggests that they may simply be flower pots.

== See also ==
- Taanach cult stand
