= Albert Glock =

American archaeologist

Albert E. Glock (September 14, 1925 – January 19, 1992) was an American archaeologist working in Palestine, where he was murdered.

Glock was born in Gifford, Idaho. His parents were deeply religious Lutherans of German ancestry living in Illinois. Albert Glock studied at several universities, graduating in 1950 at Concordia Seminary and receiving master's degree from the Lutheran School of Theology at Chicago in 1963. In 1951 he married Lois Sohn, and he served as pastor in Normal, Illinois, for several years. He enrolled at the University of Michigan to pursue his studies under the biblical scholar George E. Mendenhall, who believed the Biblical account of an Israelite invasion of Canaan was incorrect, and that what actually must lie behind the biblical version was a kind of theocratic peasants' revolt from within Canaan.

Glock, as a Lutheran missionary, came to Israel in 1962 to work on excavations of Taanach, an ancient Canaanite city in south of Jezreel Valley in Israel. Raised to believe that every word of the Bible was 'inerrant', he is described by Sari Nusseibeh as settling down, at Birzeit, to swap a religious crusade for Palestinian nationalism. He had spent 17 years in Jerusalem and the West Bank, first as a director of the Albright Institute for Archaeology and then as head of the archaeology department of Birzeit University, where he helped to found the Archaeology Institute. He was particularly dedicated to a lifelong project of excavating Ti'inik.

On January 19, 1992 Glock was shot, on the eve of his retirement, which he hoped to spend in Beit Hanina, when going to work in the West Bank. Neither reason for the murder nor who did it was reliably identified. Some of his family and most Palestinians thought Israel was responsible, while Israel blamed it on Arab hit men. Witnesses said the getaway car had Israeli license plates. When his wife called Israeli police, they showed up after a delay of 3 hours and showed little interest in investigating the murder scene. Glock's family hired a private investigator who told Sari Nusseibeh that Israeli police had arrested a Palestinian American at Ben Gurion airport, who was linked to Hamas and a terrorist cell run by Adel Awadallah. The man reportedly confessed under interrogation that Awadallah had personally assassinated Glock, as part of the internal conflict between Hamas and the more secular Fatah movement during the second Intifada.

Albert Glock was an Associate Editor of Walid Khalidi's encyclopedia of the Palestinian villages destroyed in 1948, 'All That Remains'.
