= Lachish ewer =

Late Bronze Age jug from Lachish, Israel

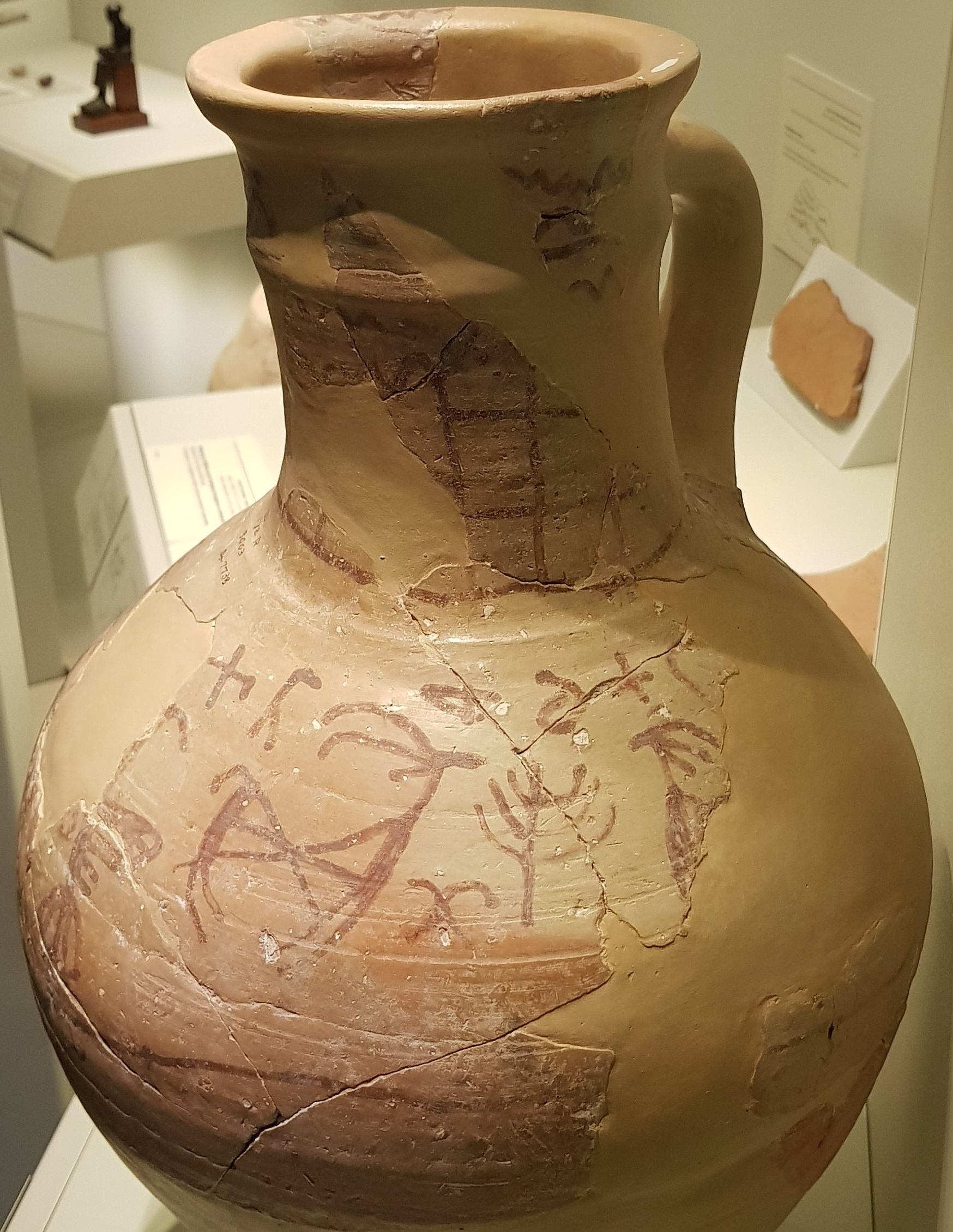
"The dedicatory inscription on the Lachish ewer [shows] the word Elat positioned immediately over the tree, indicating the... tree as a representation of the goddess Elat."

The Lachish ewer is a Late Bronze Age Canaanite jug discovered at archaeological excavations at Tell el-Duweir, identified as the site of the important ancient city of Lachish, dating from the late 13th century BC. It was discovered by the British Starkey-Tuffnell expedition, which led the first excavation of the Lachish site between 1932 and 1939.

== Discovery ==
The ewer was discovered in 1933 or 1934 in the Fosse Temple III at Level VII, the earliest archaeological layer at the site corresponding to the Late Bronze Age in the region. Its discovery was documented by James Leslie Starkey, the expedition leader, who recorded it being found in a mound near the eastern wall, with a fragment of its shoulder blackened by fire found on the plastered floor in a collection of sherds, suggesting the ewer had been in use at the time of the temple's destruction.

== Description ==
The Lachish ewer is an example of Late Bronze Age Levantine pottery, featuring a row of depicted animals and trees and an accompanying inscription by the same hand, which Starkey suggested was likely the work of a local potter. On the right main part of the ewer, the best-preserved section, the most complete tree, depicted schematically with three curved lines forming its branches, is flanked by rearing goats or ibexes with bodies formed of adjoining triangles, identified as Nubian ibexes by the archaeologist Ruth Hestrin. Proceeding left from this, clockwise around the ewer, is an animal tentatively identified as a bird, a pair of deer, female and male, leaping (identified by Hestrin as Persian fallow deer), and a lion with an unusual feathery tail. A piece of the ewer is missing at this point and much of the remaining depictions are obliterated, but a small section is preserved near the handle showing portions of another tree flanked by ibexes.

Above and between the images on the ewer is a damaged alphabetic inscription in Proto-Canaanite script, reconstructed by Frank M. Cross as:

Transcription	mtn⋮ šy ˹l˺[rb]ty ˀlt
Square Script	מתן⋮ שי ˺ל˹[רב]תי אלת
Translation	Mattan. An offering to my Lady ˀElat.
Alternate Translation	A gift: a lamb for my Lady ˀElat.

The inscription identifies the ewer as a votive offering to Asherah, whose titles included both ˀlt "Elat", the feminine equivalent of El, and rbt "lady". The conflicting translations provided by Cross variably interpret mtn as either the supplicant's given name Mattan or as a common noun meaning "gift", and šy as either "offering" or "sheep, goat"; later scholarship, including Cross himself, favoured the former translation in both cases. The three vertical dots (⋮) are present in the inscription, and are identified as a word divider used occasionally in Greek and Semitic inscriptions, but all other words preserved on the ewer are separated instead by the depicted images. The word Elat is arranged directly above the best-preserved tree figure on the ewer, implicitly identifying the tree as a representation of the goddess herself.

== Interpretation and significance ==
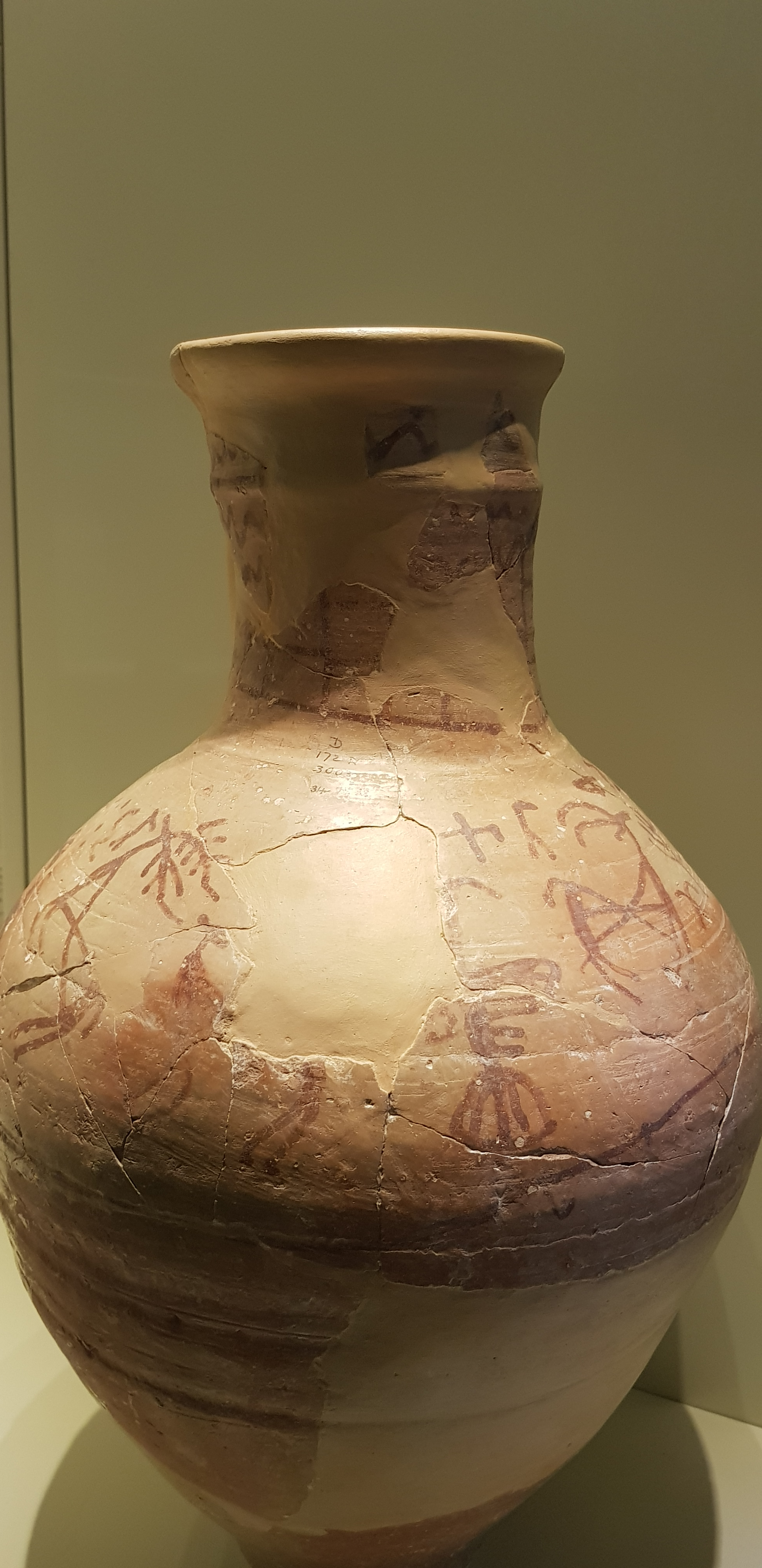
Lachish ewer

Upon its discovery, Starkey described the decoration as "not usual" in its free treatment of a register of animals, a simple style bearing vivid depictions of rearing ibexes and deer mid-leap. The symbolism of goats or ibexes flanking a tree has been identified as a common "age-old motif" in ancient Near Eastern iconography, appearing in the Levant from the early 2nd millennium BC onwards and prominently in pottery from other sites such as Ta'anakh and Megiddo during the Near Eastern Late Bronze Age II A and II B (1400–1200 BC). During this item's era they symbolize the goddess Asherah, who is associated most commonly with trees in general. The ewer has been compared with a counterpart, a goblet also found in the Fosse Temple excavations at Lachish, displaying a similar motif with a pubic triangle replacing the tree between ibexes, supporting the notion that both were interchangeable in representing Asherah's aspect as a fertility goddess.

Another notable aspect of the ewer, particularly of interest to the development of ancient Israelite culture, is its notably menorah-like tree as the object of focus and a manifestation of the goddess. The use of artificial, geometric or stylised sacred trees is a common motif in its own right, attested in Assyrian art and Mitanni seals from the beginning of the 2nd millennium BC onwards, and non-lifelike trees are associated with Asherah specifically through examples such as the Asherah pole.

The jug is considered as important as pithos A from Kuntillet Ajrud and the Ta'anakh cult stand. It is one of the most common points of reference to discuss the typical characteristics of art of its type and era. An excellent parallel called the Burna krater was publicized in 2022.

== Gallery of iconographically similar artifacts ==
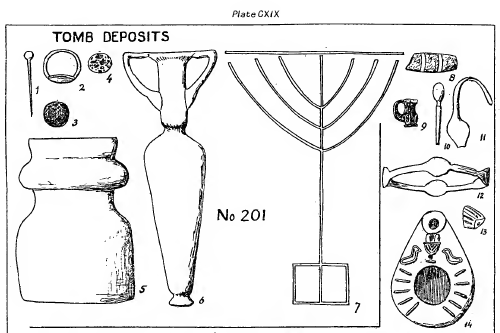
Tomb deposits from Gezer, including drawing of Menorah-like shape

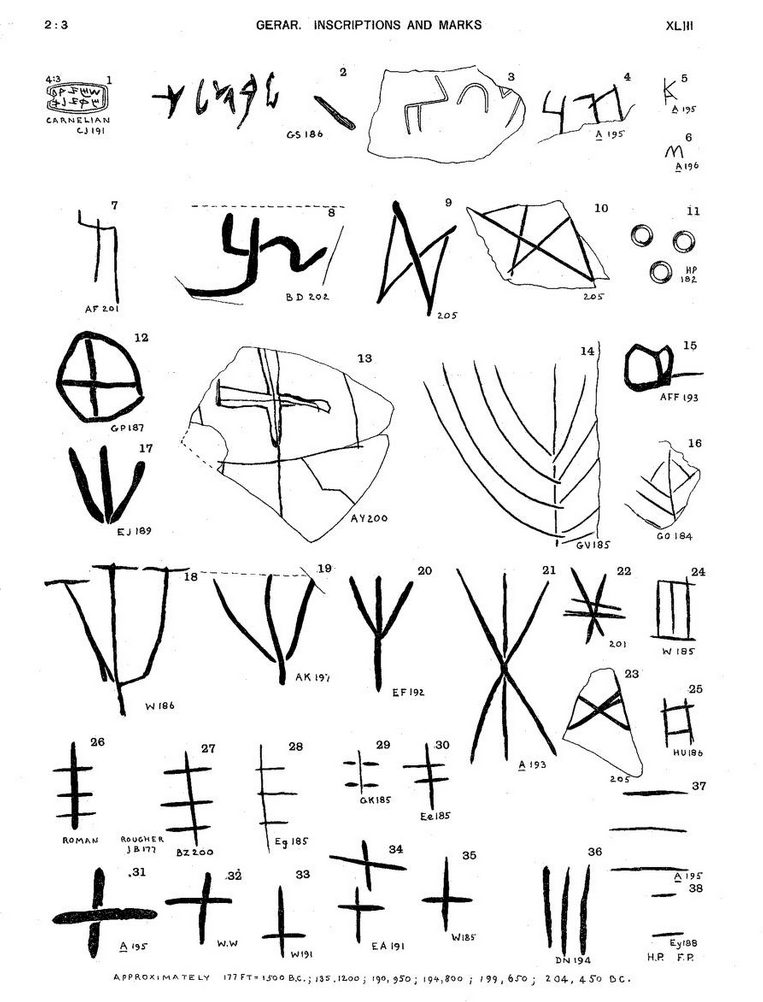
Tell Jemmeh, potters' trade marks including Menorah-lookalike, by Flinders Petrie

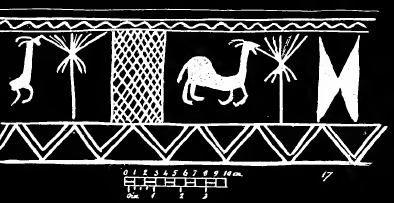
Gezer, RAS Macalister (1912), "The Excavation of Gezer", seal impression with horned animal and tree

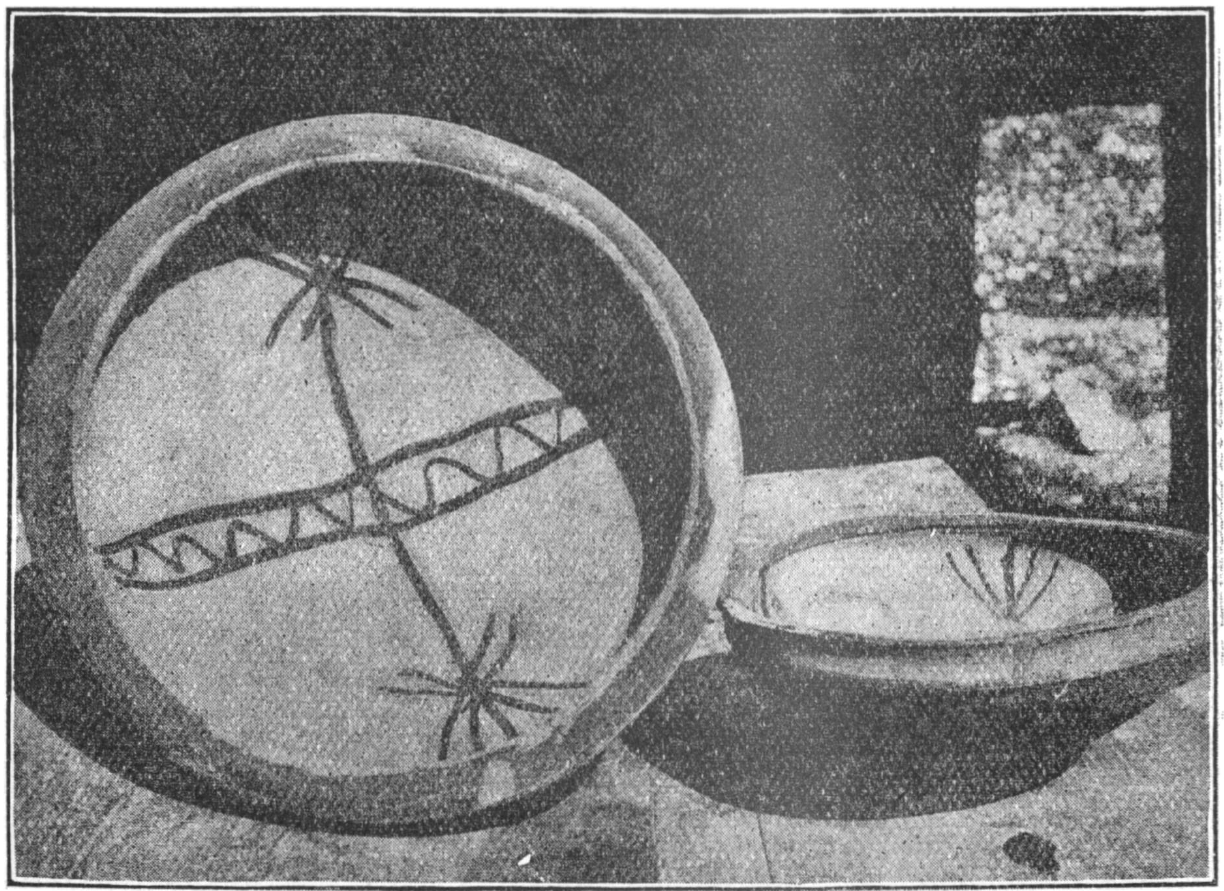
Macalister (1912), the "palm and panelled zigzag" pattern on Gezer pottery (Fig. 346, p. 191)

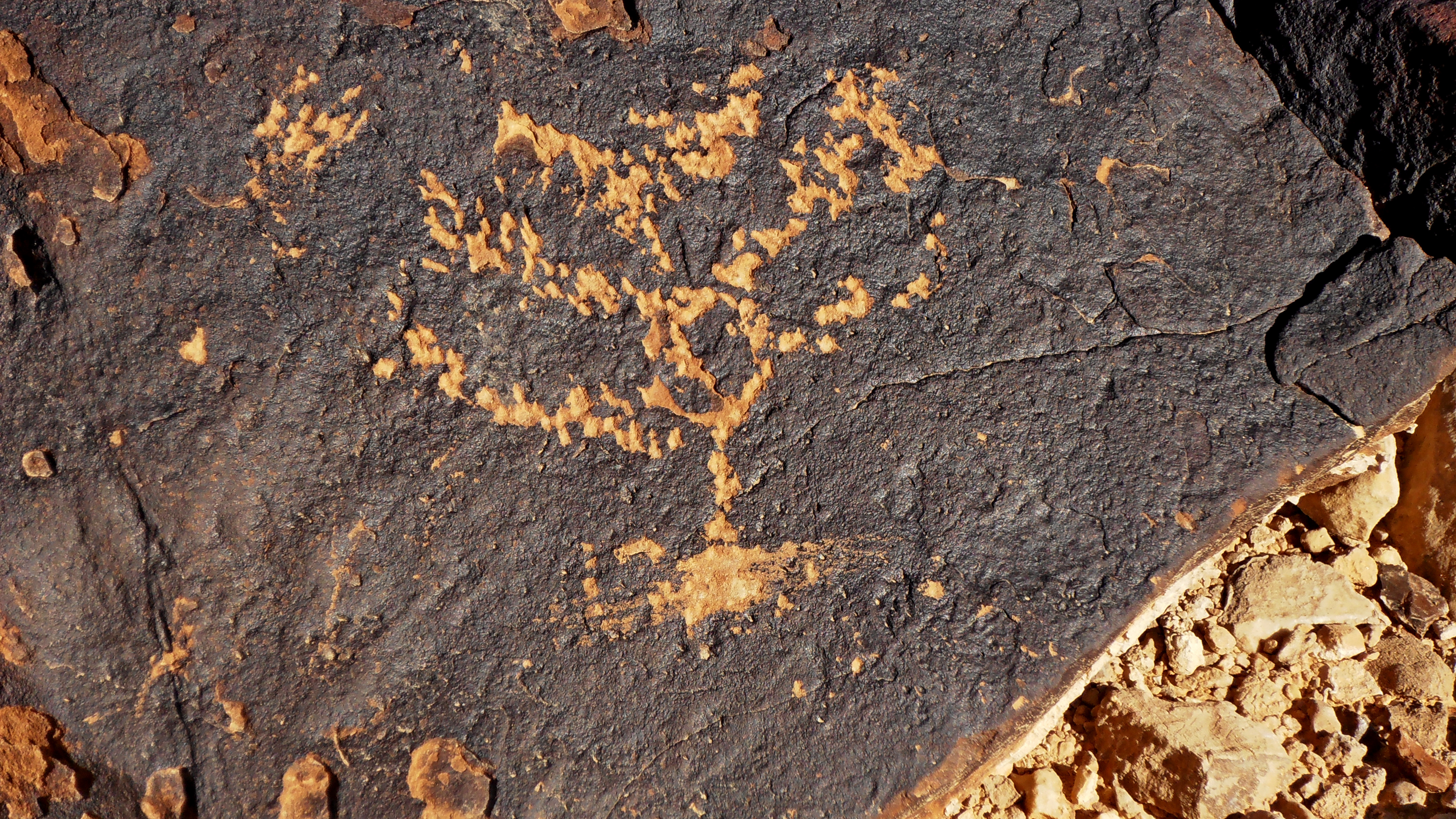
Rock art from Mount Karkom in the Negev: menorah-like incised drawing

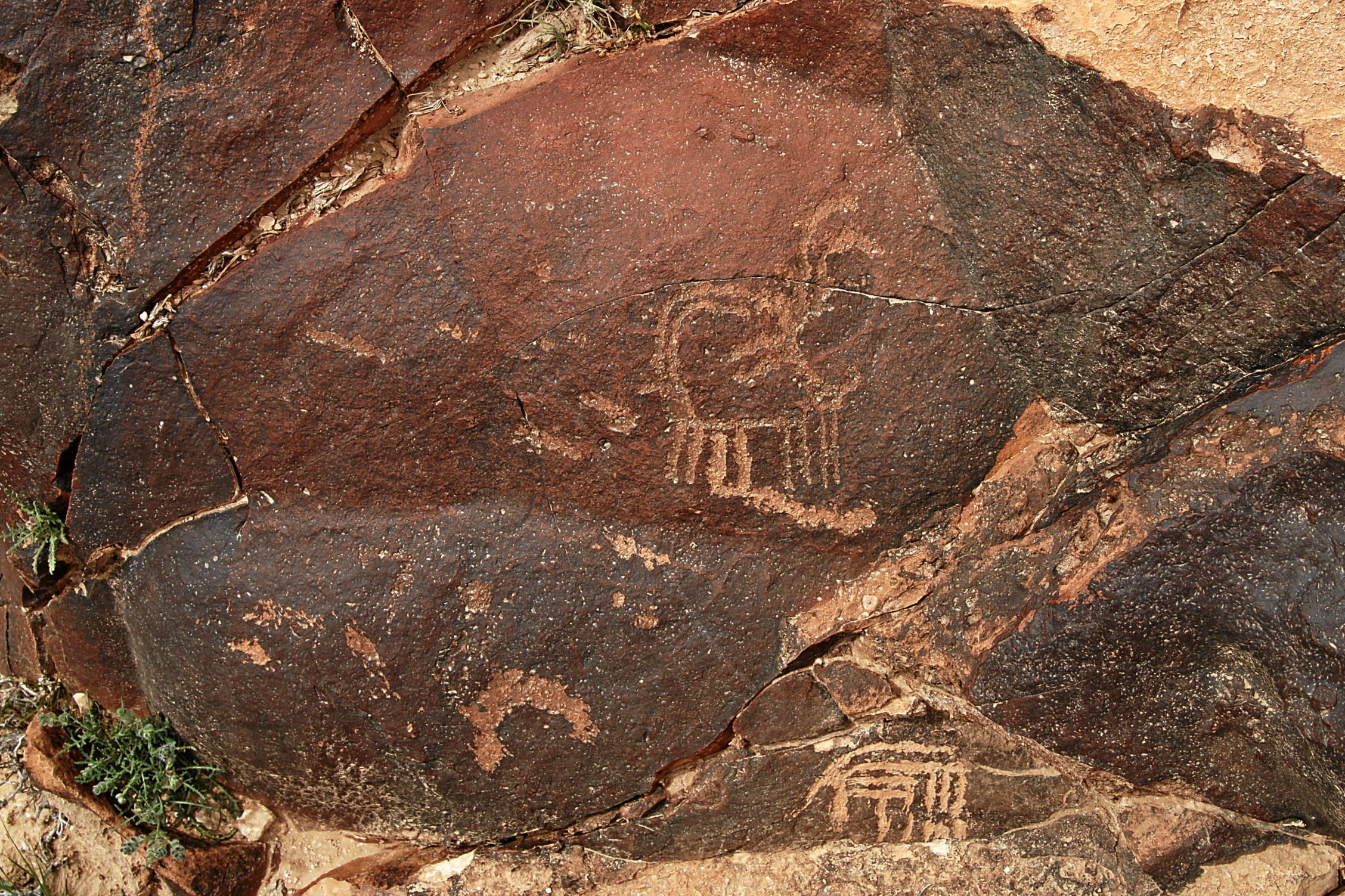
Petroglyphs from Mount Mihya in the Negev (Lipa Gal Lookout near Avdat) depicting horned animals, probably ibex

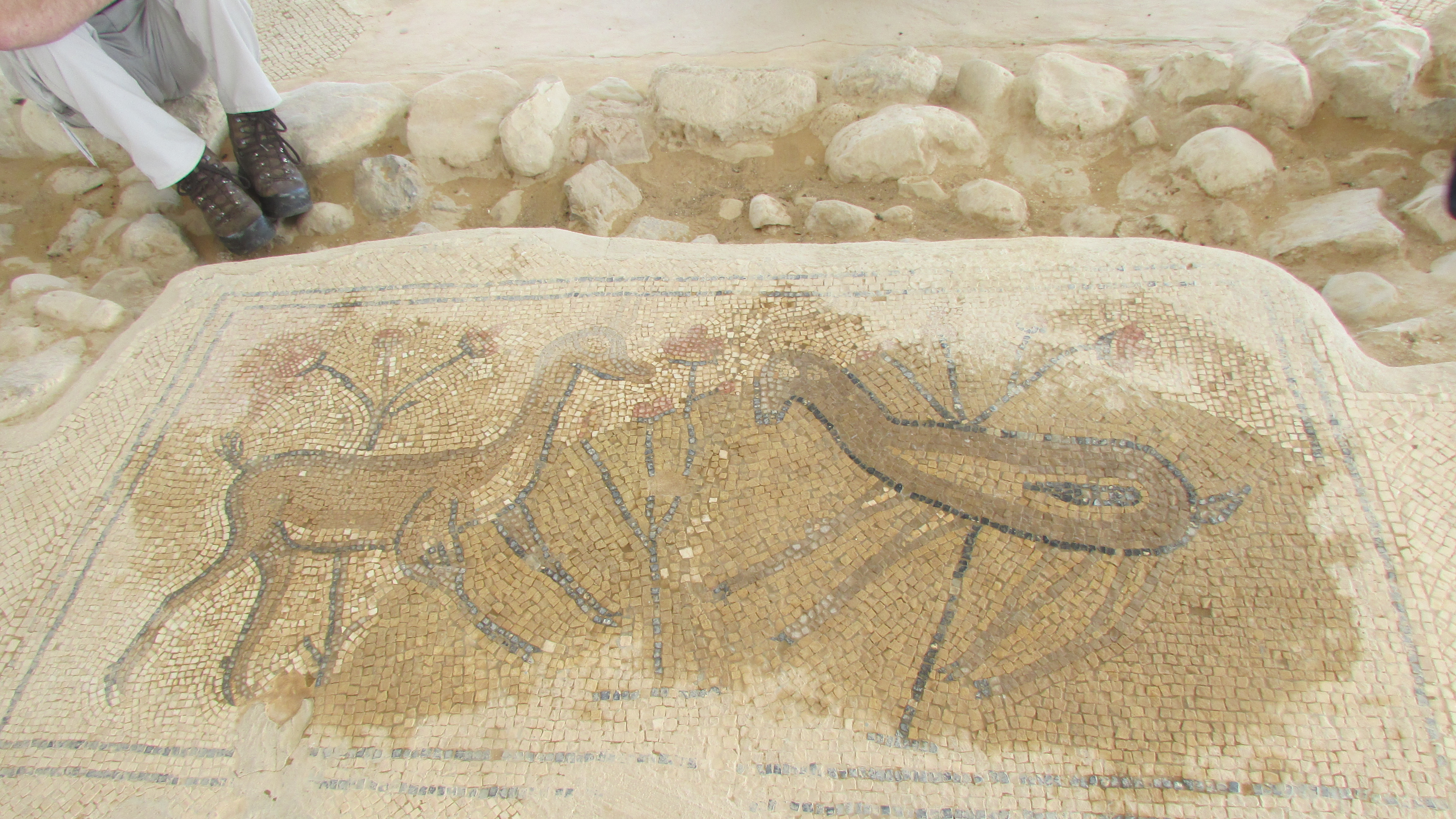
Caprids at the tree motif at Naaran's zodiac synagogue mosaic

== See also ==
- Lachish
- Lachish letters
- Lachish reliefs
- LMLK seal
- Kuntillet Ajrud inscriptions
- Ta'anach cult stand

== Bibliography ==
- Hestrin, Ruth (1987). "The Lachish Ewer and the 'Asherah". Israel Exploration Journal. 37 (4). Israel Exploration Society: 212–223. ISSN 0021-2059. JSTOR 27926074.
- Locatell, Christian; McKinny, Chris; Shai, Itzhaq (2022-09-30). "Tree of Life Motif, Late Bronze Canaanite Cult, and a Recently Discovered Krater from Tel Burna". Journal of the American Oriental Society. 142 (3): 573–596. doi:10.7817/jaos.142.3.2022.ar024. ISSN 2169-2289. Abstract accessible for free; article by subscription.
- Winter, Urs (1983). Frau und Göttin (in German). Freiburg (CH) & Göttingen: Vandenhoeck & Ruprecht. ISBN 3-525-53673-9.
- Steiner, Richard C. (2016). "The Lachish Ewer: An Offering and a Tribute". Eretz-Israel: Archaeological, Historical and Geographical Studies. Joseph Naveh Volume. 32: 103*–112*. hdl:20.500.12202/7785. ISSN 0071-108X. JSTOR 26732502.
- Meshel, Z.; Ben-Ami, D.; Aḥituv, S.; Freud, L.; Sandhaus, D.; Kuper-Blau, T. (2012). Kuntillet ʻAjrud (Ḥorvat Teman): An Iron Age II Religious Site on the Judah-Sinai Border. Hazor. Israel Exploration Society. ISBN 978-965-221-088-3.
- Taylor, Joan E. (1995), "The Asherah, the Menorah and the Sacred Tree", Journal for the Study of the Old Testament, 20 (66), University of Sheffield, Dept. of Biblical Studies: 29–54, doi:10.1177/030908929502006602, ISSN 0309-0892, OCLC 88542166, S2CID 170422840
- Olyan, Saul M. (1988). Asherah and the Cult of Yahweh in Israel. Atlanta, Georgia: Atlanta, Ga. : Scholars Press. ISBN 978-1-55540-253-2.
