= Ta'anakh cult stand =

10th-century BCE artifact from Canaan

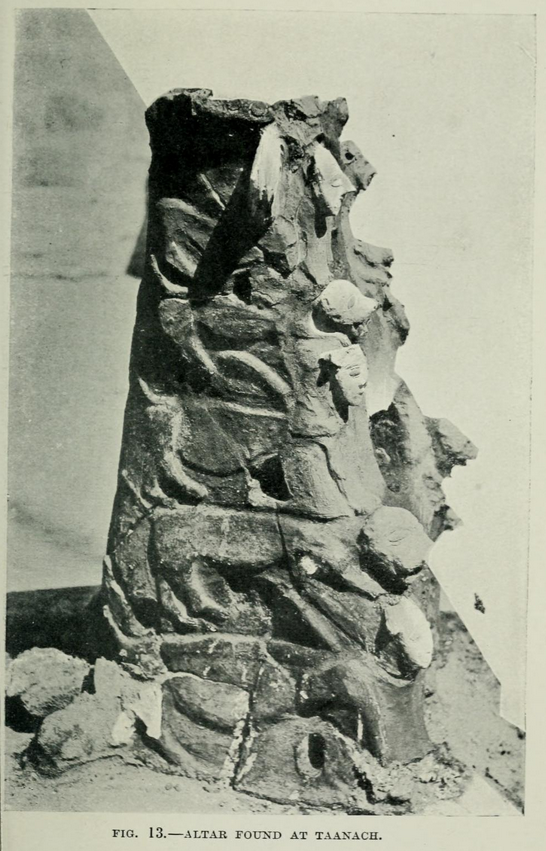
Ta'anach altar A, in the Israel Museum, is tapered like the letter A, while stand B in Turkey is boxier.

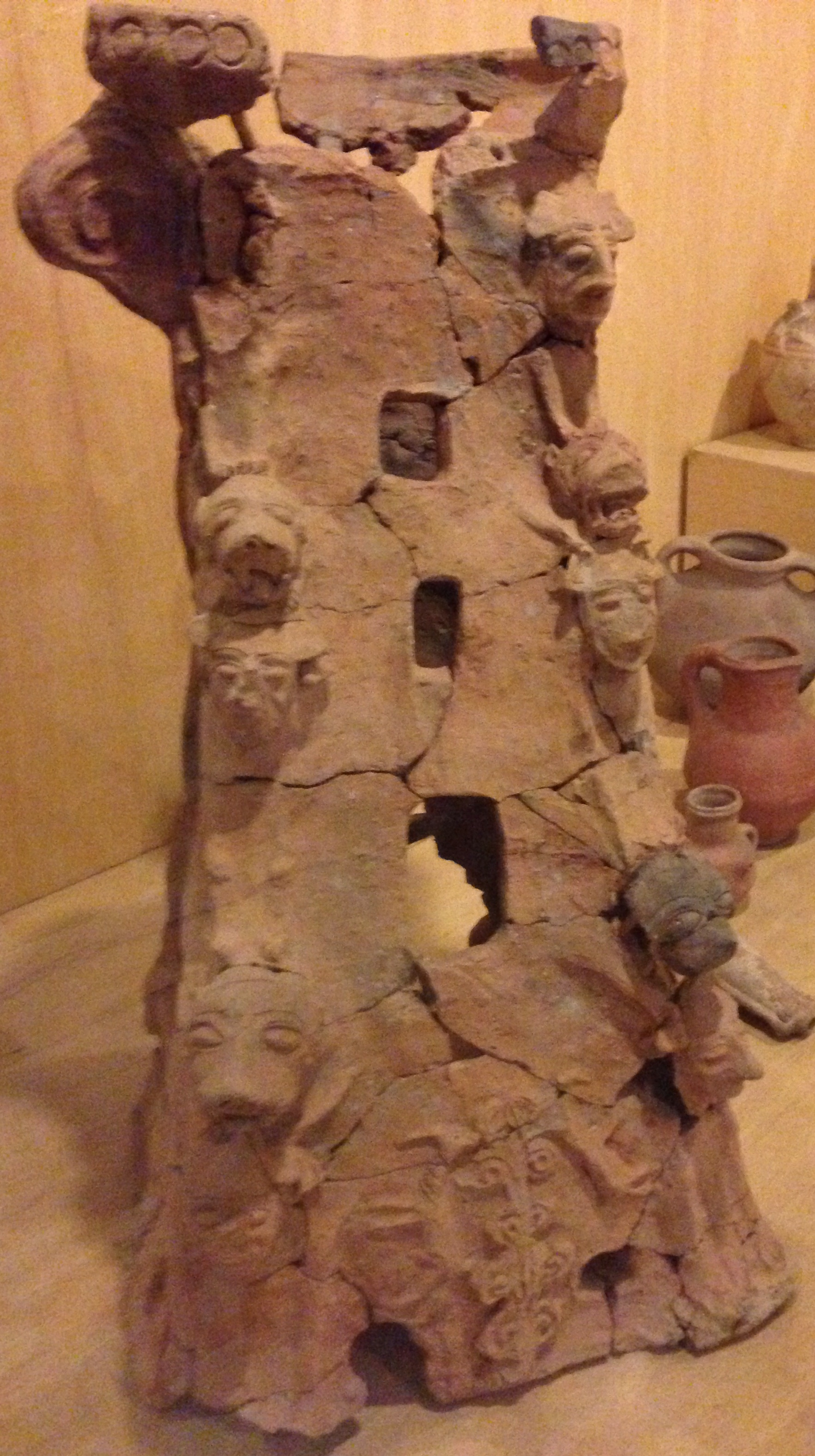
Cultic incense stand found at Ta'anach (a site on the rim of the Jezreel Valley close to Megiddo) dated to the time of Israelite occupation in the tenth century BCE

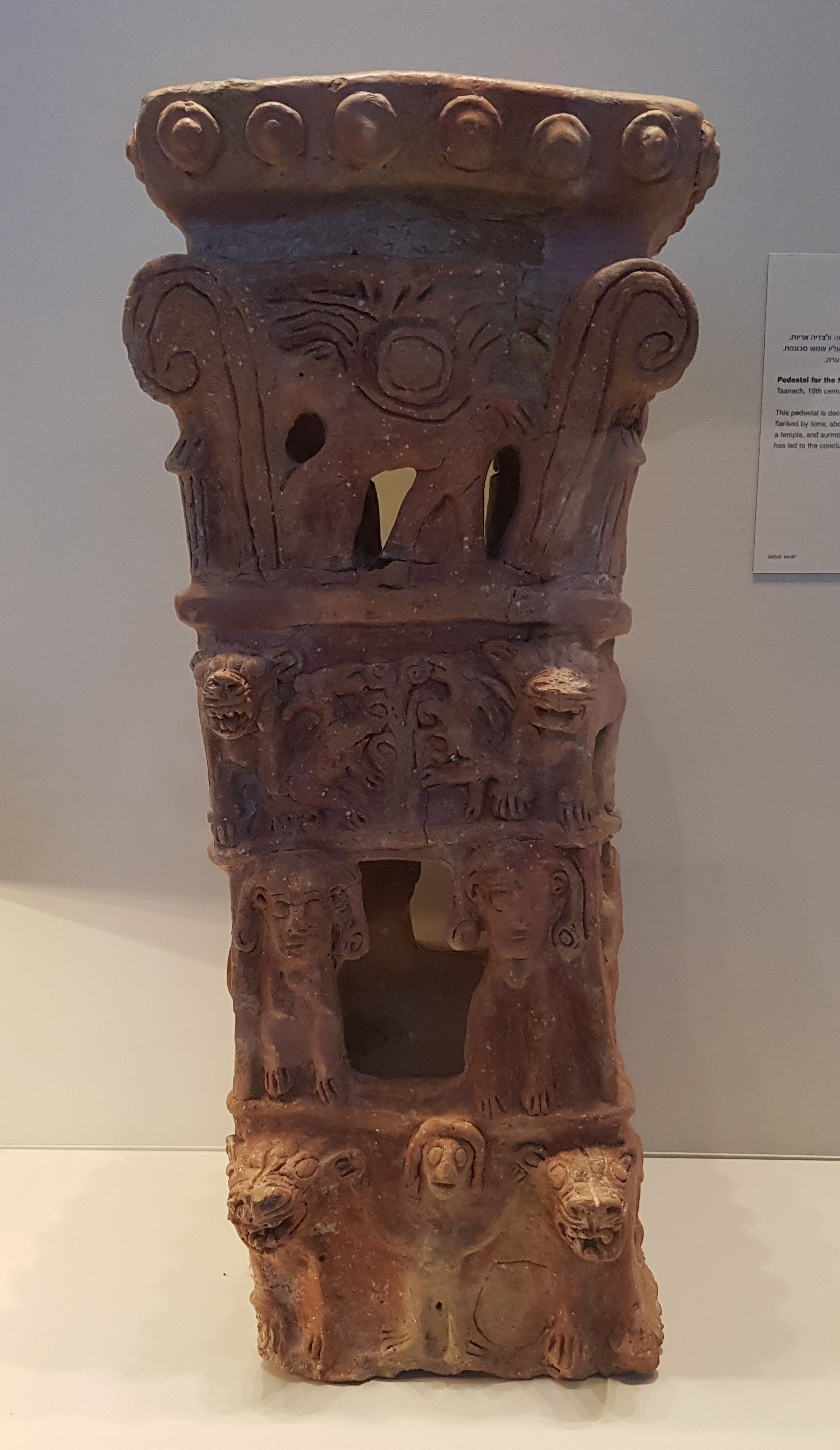
Asherah is shown in human-like and tree form. "In the centre of the bottom register stands a naked goddess, controlling, one with each hand, two flanking lions."

The Ta'anakh cult stand was found in the ancient city of Ta'anakh in the present-day West Bank, near Megiddo, Israel. It dates to the 10th century BCE, and has various images that are related to the religious practices of the Israelites. Some think that the "elaborate" 53 cm (21 in) stand was used for offering incense to the gods, while others suggest that it was a miniature representation of a temple or a shrine. The stand has four tiers.

The fenestrated (window-bearing) stand is one of the most important archaeological discoveries for the study of ancient Near Eastern religions, especially the cults of Yahweh and his consort Asherah. Many publications have referred to this connection, especially before the publications of the Kuntillet Ajrud inscriptions, more blatantly Asheratic, during the 2010s. In fact, the stand and the inscriptions are called "as notable" as the Lachish ewer.

A few such cult stands were found in Pella and Lachish though "most were unfortunately purchased from grave robbers". They are clearly connected with Late Bronze and Early Iron Age traditions, showing continuity of worship of the goddess Asherah ("known all over the Levant as the Lion Lady") in Israel during the 10th century BCE. The Lachish cult stand was found with a limestone altar and massebot in a small cultic room associated with a public shrine. They could have held gifts, bowls, libations.

== Depiction ==
=== Not depicted ===
It's not immediately clear if any of the creatures are meant to depict Yahweh, who's typically shown as anthropomorphic, bovine, or between. Some suggest the windows (this is a fenestrated cult stand, in antiquarian jargon) are in fact voids, i.e.: where God is not shown, as aniconism would rise later from the Babylonian captivity to the Maccabean period. But "[a]n early aniconism... is purely a projection of the post-exilic imagination".

=== Depicted ===
Asherah in embodied form with her typical symbols, and in her form of a small sacred tree. There's also a larger tree without the personal equivalence: "In the Ta'anach stands, the tree is an upright trunk with several furled fronds coming out from the two sides; in one case six and in the other eight." On the upper (IV) storey is the divine sun with a horse, showing a solar-equine motif as central that would persist in Hebrew Zodiac art into the common era.

== Stand use ==
People have different interpretations for what may have gone upon stands like these. A recent find had a like jut of clay inside, a tab to hold another broken-off piece to it. A rod was placed in hypostatic holes to form a skewer joint. In other words, a cult stand could be one part of a ceramic construction with some complexity of build.

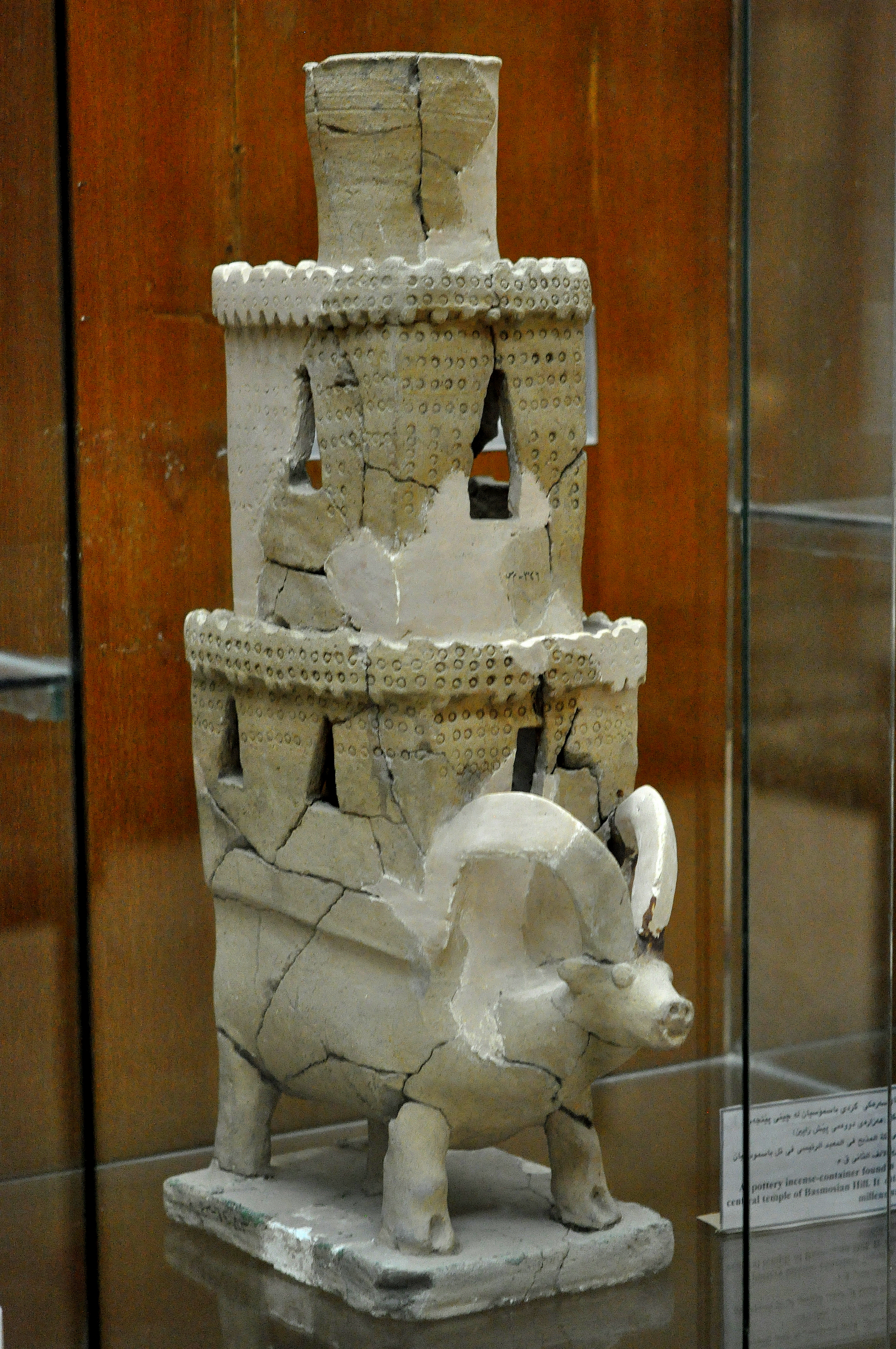
Earlier Hurrian cult stand

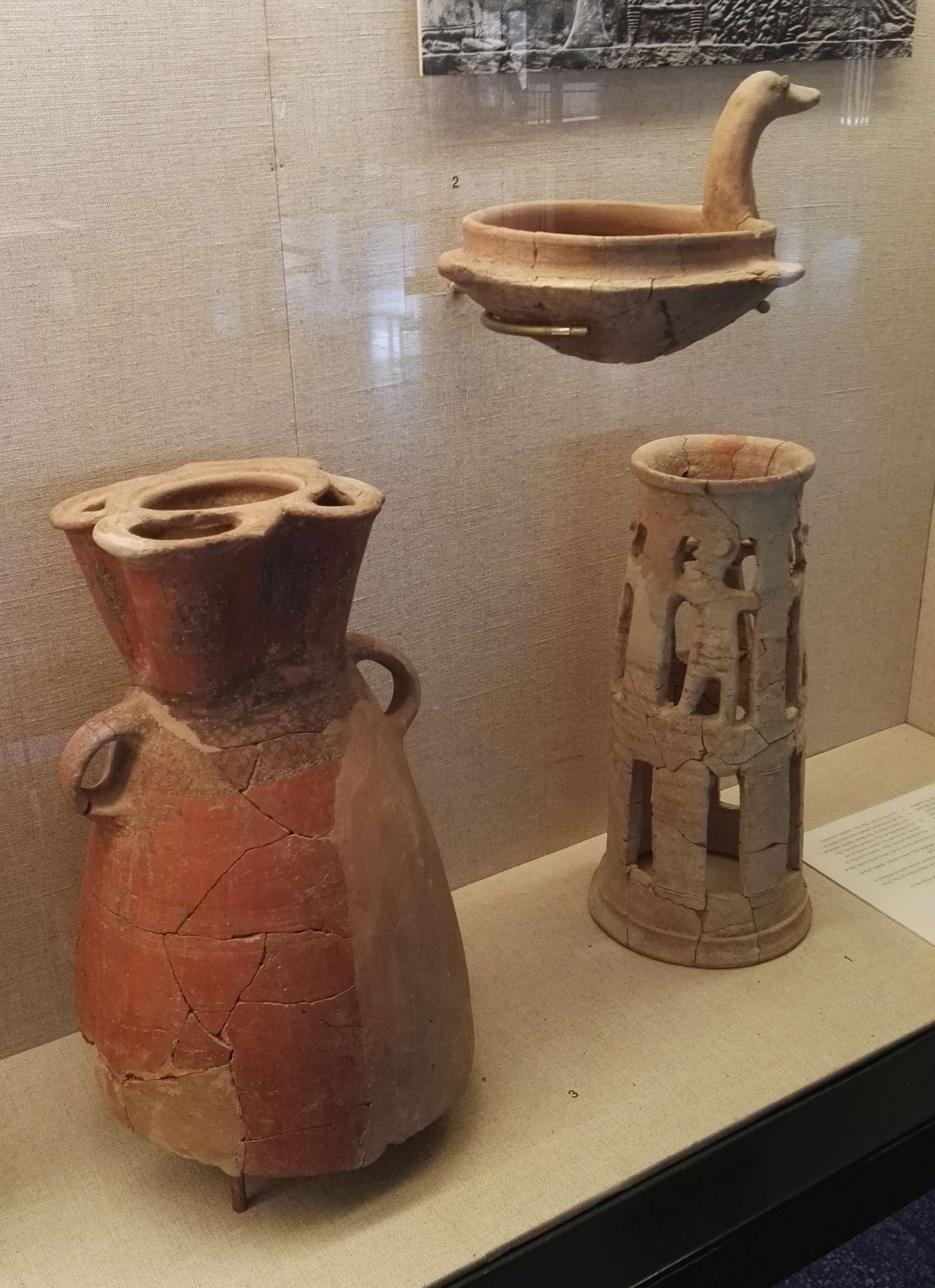
This fenestration attempt shows an irregular pattern.

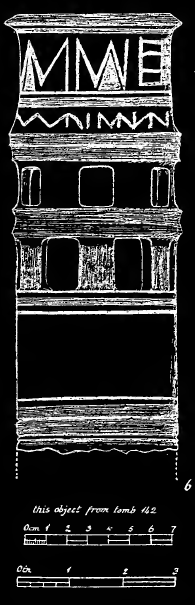
Illustration of a cult stand from Gezer

== See also ==
- Deir Alla Inscription
- Minoan snake tube

== Bibliography ==
- Taylor, Joan E. (1995). "The Asherah, the Menorah and the Sacred Tree". Journal for the Study of the Old Testament. 20 (66). SAGE Publications: 29–54. doi:10.1177/030908929502006602. ISSN 0309-0892.
- MacDonald, Nathan (2007). "Aniconism in the Old Testament". In Gordon, R. P. (ed.). The God of Israel. Cambridge University Press. ISBN 978-0-521-87365-9.
