= Ti'inik =

Ta'anach
- Municipality type D (Village council)

Arabic transcription(s)
  - Arabic: تعنّك
- Location of Ti'inik within Palestine Ta'anach (State of Palestine)
- Coordinates: 32°31′11″N 35°13′16″E
- Palestine grid: 170/214
- State: Palestine
- Governorate: Jenin

Government
  - Type: Village council

Population (2017)
  - Total: 1,298
- Name meaning: From Hebrew: sandy

Ti'inik, also transliterated Ti’innik (Arabic: تعنّك), or Ta'anakh/Taanach (Hebrew: תַּעְנַךְ), is a Palestinian village, located 13 km northwest of the city of Jenin in the northern West Bank.

The village is located on the slopes of an archaeological tell identified with the biblical city of Ta'anach, which has seen intermittent habitation spanning 5000 years.

According to the Palestinian Central Bureau of Statistics, the village had a population of 1,095 inhabitants in mid-year 2006.

== History ==
Just to the north of Ti'inik is a 40-metre-high mound which was the site of the biblical city of Taanach or Tanach (Hebrew: תַּעֲנָךְ; Ancient Greek: Θαναάχ and Θανάκ), a Levitical city allocated to the Kohathites.

=== Early Bronze Age ===
In the EBA, Taanach was about 14 acres (5.67 ha), competing with nearby Megiddo.

In Early Bronze IIIA (c. 2750-2500 BCE, it became a forifice town with a well-organized administration. In Early Bronze IIIB-IV (c. 2500-2000 BCE), the region withness decline.

=== Middle Bronze Age ===
In Middle Bronze IIA (MB IIA), Taanach was unsettled. In Middle Bronze IIB (MB IIB), Tannach was a campsite. In Middle Bronze IIC (MB IIC), Taanach flourished. There was a peaceful transition into the Late Bronze Age.

=== Late Bronze Age ===
==== Egyptian period ====
In the Late Bronze, the toponym tꜣꜥnꜣkꜣ was known and the area was in the administrative sphere of the Egyptian Empire.

X1 G1 F32 D36 N35 G1 V31 G1 N25
tꜣꜥnꜣkꜣ
in hieroglyphs
Era: New Kingdom
(1550–1069 BC)

Ta'anach appears in the Papyrus Petersburg 1116A which lists it among those who sent Canaanite envoys (maryannu) to Egyptian pharaoh Amenophis II. In the 14th century BCE Amarna letters, it is one of the many Palestinian city-states ruled by petty kings, whose ruler's name is recorded in Amarna letter EA 245 as Yashdata. The name of its ruler in the late 15th century BCE is known to be Reshawur, as attested in thirteen cuneiform tablets found at the site which document his exchanges of letters with neighbouring kings and with an official conjectured to be a representative of Egypt in Gaza.

Excavations at the tell were carried out by Albert Glock mostly during the 1970s and 1980s. Twelve of the tablets discovered were in Akkadian cuneiform tablets, with one third of the names listed on speculated to be of Hurrian, or more loosely, northern origin.

=== Iron Age ===
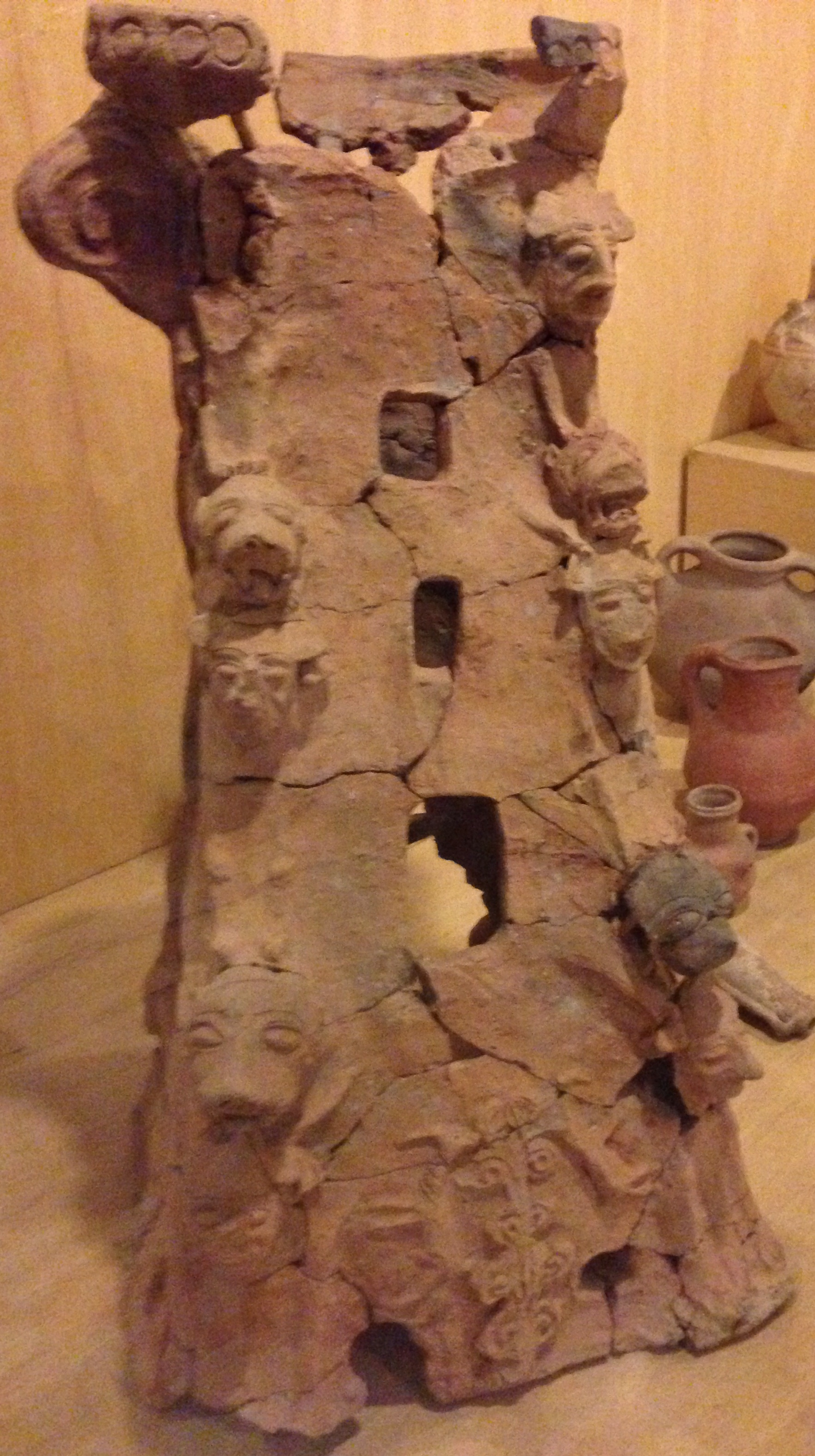
Cultic terracotta found at Tel Taanach, now in the Istanbul Archaeology Museums

Tell Ta'annek/Tel Ta'anach. During Iron Age II, Ta'anach was a city in the Kingdom of Israel. Archaeologist William G. Dever estimates the city's population to have ranged between 500 and 1,000 people during the 9th and 8th centuries BCE.

The Ta'anakh cult stand is dated to the 10th century BCE. It depicts a naked mother goddess figure, sporting hair styled in a way evocative of Hathor, with sacred tree and bull symbology that is connected alternately to Baal-Hadad or El, deities in the Canaanite pantheon. There is disagreement as to whether the object depicts Astarte, another Canaanite goddess of the wilderness, with others seeing Asherah, the consort of Yahweh.

==== Early Iron Metallurgy ====
The site of Taanach yielded a group of very early iron artifacts. They indicate that Taanach’s blacksmiths had figured out how to intentionally harden and carburize iron. The terminus ante quem (latest possible date) of these objects is around 925 B.C. Study of iron artifacts from Philistine sites do not reveal such consistent technical achievements.

The date of these objects corresponds closely to the Egyptian pharaoh Shoshenq I's campaign in the region.

Nevertheless, the subsequent study by Eliyahu-Behar (2018) tried to show that the technological sophistication of these early artifacts was somewhat exaggerated, and that the evidence for systematic carburization and/or quenching in such artifacts as found at Taanach is not so clear.

==== In the Bible ====
Taanach and Megiddo are mentioned in the Book of Judges as indicating the location of the Battle of Mount Tabor (biblical) between the Canaanites, led by King Jabin of Hazor, with Sisera acting as his military commander, and the Israelite forces led by Deborah and Barak. In this confrontation, Sisera’s forces were said to have huge technological advantage, because they had ‘900 iron chariots’. Also, the cavalry base of Sisera, Harosheth Haggoyim, in translation from Hebrew means a ‘Smithy of the Nations’. But, according to The Song of Deborah, because of the divine intervention, a huge downpour and flood occurred which rendered Sisera’s chariots useless, so he lost the battle.

Anson Rainey, based on cuneiform texts such as the Amarna texts and Taanach tablets, reconstructs the history and historical geography of Taanach and the Jezreel Valley more generally. He argues that the battle took place in the broad, flat agricultural plain of the Jezreel Valley, situated directly between Taanach and Megiddo.

Rainey associates the biblical mention of "Taanach by the waters of Megiddo" with the geographical reality of this area, being the floodplain of the Kishon River. The nearby plain east of Megiddo witnessed many battles throughout history. He also argues that Harosheth Haggoyim (seen as Sisera's hometown) is not a specific city but a region.

=== Classical & Middle Ages ===
==== Roman to Mamluk periods ====
In Roman, Byzantine and Early Islamic times, the inhabited site was located on the lower slopes rather than the tell itself.

Pottery remains from the Roman and Byzantine periods, the "Middle Ages" (defined as lasting from the Umayyad through to the Mamluk period), and the Ottoman period have been found in the area covering the tell and the core of the modern village. The main remains visible today are of an 11th-century Abbasid palace.

==== Ottoman period ====
Ti'innik, like the rest of Palestine, was incorporated into the Ottoman Empire in 1517. During the 16th and 17th centuries, Ti'innik belonged to the Turabay Emirate (1517-1683), which encompassed also the Jezreel Valley, Haifa, Jenin, Beit She'an Valley, northern Jabal Nablus, Bilad al-Ruha/Ramot Menashe, and the northern part of the Sharon plain.

In the census of 1596, the village appeared as "Ta'inniq", located in the nahiya of Sha'ara in the liwa of Lajjun. It had a population of 13 households, all Muslim. They paid taxes on agricultural products, including wheat, barley, summer crops, goats and beehives, in addition to occasional revenues; a total of 7,000 akçe.

=== Modern Age ===
In 1838, Ta'annuk was noted as a Muslim village in the Jenin district; It only contained a few families, but was said to have been much larger, and to contain ruins.

In 1870 Victor Guérin found that the village consisted of ten houses. He further described it as: 'Once the southern sides and the whole upper plateau of the oblong hill on which the village stands were covered with buildings, as is proved by the innumerable fragments of pottery scattered on the soil, and the materials of every kind which are met with at every step: the larger stones have been carried away elsewhere. Below the village is a little mosque, which passes for an ancient Christian church. It lies, in fact, east and west, and all the stones with which it is built belong to early constructions; some of them are decorated with sculptures. Farther on in the plain are several cisterns cut in the rock, and a well, called Bir Tannuk.

In 1870/1871 (1288 AH), an Ottoman census listed the village in the nahiya of Shafa al-Gharby.

In 1882 the PEF's Survey of Western Palestine (SWP) described it as "A small village, which stands on the south-east side of the great Tell or mound of the same name at the edge of the plain. It has olives on the south, and wells on the north, and is surrounded with cactus hedges. There is a white dome in the village. The rock on the sides of the Tell is quarried in places, the wells are ancient, and rock-cut tombs occur on the north near the foot of the mound."

By 1917, the village was home to eight family groups residing in 17 single-room houses.

==== British Mandate ====
In the 1922 census of Palestine, conducted by the British Mandate authorities, Ti'inik had a population of 65; all Muslims. In the 1931 census it had 64; still all Muslim, in a total of 15 houses.

In the 1945 statistics the population was estimated at 100 Muslims, with 32,263 dunams of land, according to an official land and population survey. 452 dunams were used for plantations and irrigable land, 31,301 dunams for cereals, while a total of 4 dunams were built-up, urban land.

In addition to agriculture, residents practiced animal husbandry which formed was an important source of income for the town. In 1943, they owned 39 heads of cattle, 4 camels, 14 horses, a mule, 20 donkeys, 168 fowls, and 15 pigeons.

==== Jordanian period ====
In the wake of the 1948 Arab–Israeli War, and after the 1949 Armistice Agreements, Ti'inik came under Jordanian rule.

The Jordanian census of 1961 found 246 inhabitants.

==== Post-1967 ====
Since the Six-Day War in 1967, Ti'inik has been under Israeli occupation.

== Demography ==
=== Local origins ===
Some residents of Ti'inik have their origins in Silat al-Harithiya and Arraba, while others originated from the area of Bayt Nattif.

== See also ==
- Ti'inik cult stand

== Bibliography ==
- Barron, J.B., ed. (1923). Palestine: Report and General Abstracts of the Census of 1922. Government of Palestine.
- Conder, C.R.; Kitchener, H.H. (1882). The Survey of Western Palestine: Memoirs of the Topography, Orography, Hydrography, and Archaeology. Vol. 2. London: Committee of the Palestine Exploration Fund.
- Dauphin, C. (1998). La Palestine byzantine, Peuplement et Populations. BAR International Series 726 (in French). Vol. III : Catalogue. Oxford: Archeopress. p. 743. ISBN 978-0-860549-05-5.
- Freedman, D.N. (2000). "Taanach". Eerdmans Dictionary of the Bible. W.B. Eerdmans. ISBN 978-0-8028-2400-4.
- Government of Jordan, Department of Statistics (1964). First Census of Population and Housing. Volume I: Final Tables; General Characteristics of the Population (PDF).
- Government of Palestine, Department of Statistics (1945). Village Statistics, April, 1945.
- Guérin, V. (1875). Description Géographique Historique et Archéologique de la Palestine (in French). Vol. 2: Samarie, pt. 2. Paris: L'Imprimerie Nationale.
- Hadawi, S. (1970). Village Statistics of 1945: A Classification of Land and Area ownership in Palestine. Palestine Liberation Organization Research Center.
- Hütteroth, W.-D.; Abdulfattah, K. (1977). Historical Geography of Palestine, Transjordan and Southern Syria in the Late 16th Century. Erlanger Geographische Arbeiten, Sonderband 5. Erlangen, Germany: Vorstand der Fränkischen Geographischen Gesellschaft. ISBN 978-3-920405-41-4.
- Mills, E., ed. (1932). Census of Palestine 1931. Population of Villages, Towns and Administrative Areas. Jerusalem: Government of Palestine.
- Palmer, E.H. (1881). The Survey of Western Palestine: Arabic and English Name Lists Collected During the Survey by Lieutenants Conder and Kitchener, R. E. Transliterated and Explained by E.H. Palmer. Committee of the Palestine Exploration Fund.
- Robinson, E.; Smith, E. (1841). Biblical Researches in Palestine, Mount Sinai and Arabia Petraea: A Journal of Travels in the year 1838. Vol. 3. Boston: Crocker & Brewster.
- Zertal, A. (2016). The Manasseh Hill Country Survey. Vol. 3. Boston: BRILL. ISBN 978-9004312302.
