= Sótanos of Cardinal Cisneros =

The Sótanos del Cardenal Cisneros are basements and a Moorish house located in Toledo, Castile-La Mancha, Spain. This space houses the archaeological vestiges of a primitive Islamic house from the Caliphate period, of which there remain a courtyard and a hall, as well as the remains of the architectural decoration of the same, consisting of two horseshoe arches, one of them twinned. This primitive house is built on the natural geological terrain, which in this area presents a sharp slope in a southerly direction, being filled with debris and remains belonging to earlier phases of Roman and Visigothic times, some of whose construction materials were reused in the new Islamic construction.

It would highlight the finding of the figurative parietal decoration documented in the twin arch, in whose jambs two hands of hamsa were arranged, one of which is surrounded by three birds of a stylized figure. Both motifs are typical in Islamic art, and have a meaning of protection and rejection of evil influences, specifically against the evil eye (Hamsa's hand) and perhaps funerary (in the case of birds). Both are decorative motifs of pre-Islamic origin that must have a strong popular roots and are to a certain extent tolerated by the official Islamic doctrine, although as in the case of birds they come from a hadith or unofficial oral tradition attributed to Muhammad, In which they are identified as the transmitters of the souls of the good believers in their journey to Paradise.
