= Minoan snake goddess figurines =

Artifacts from the Minoan civilization

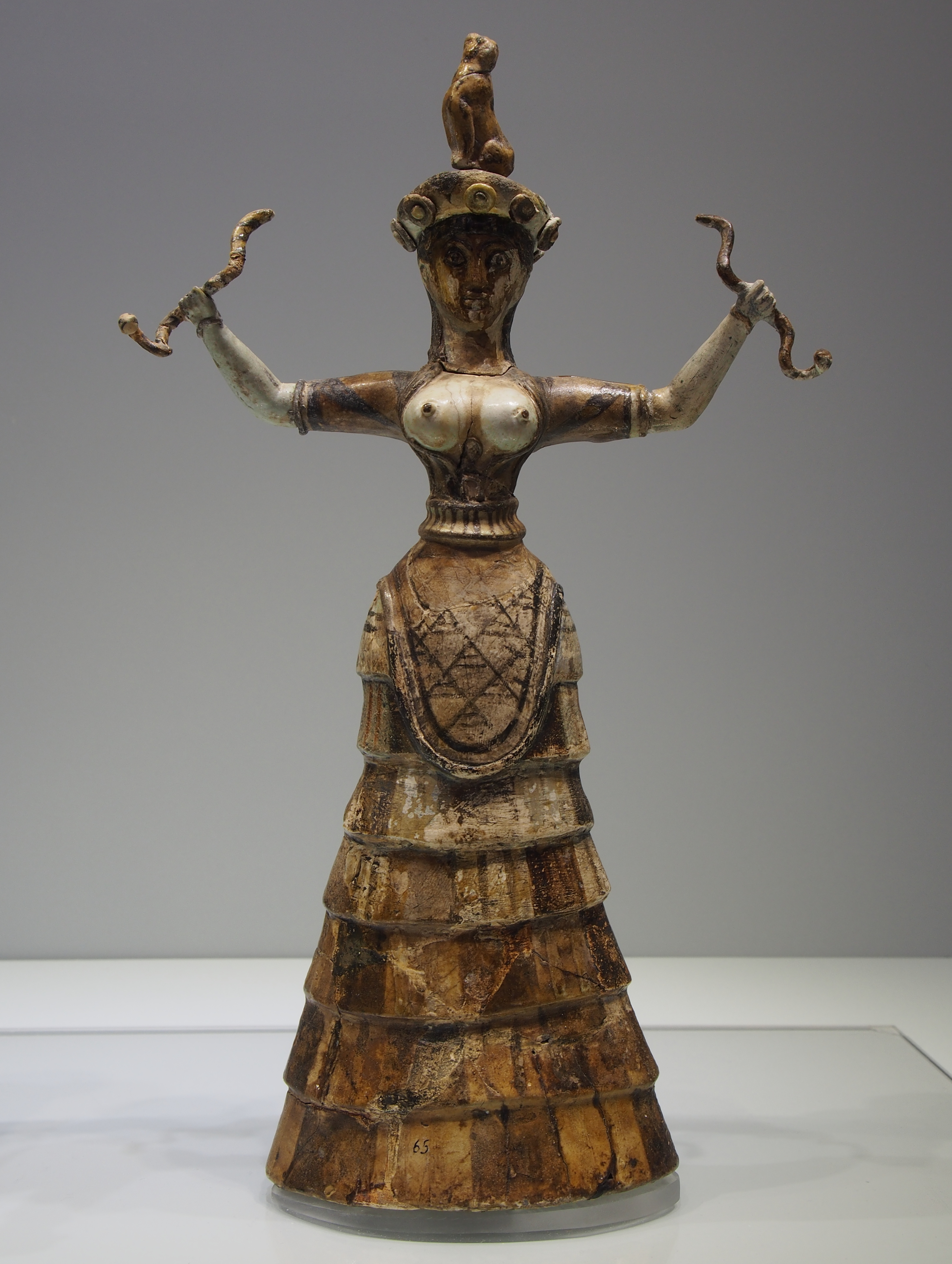
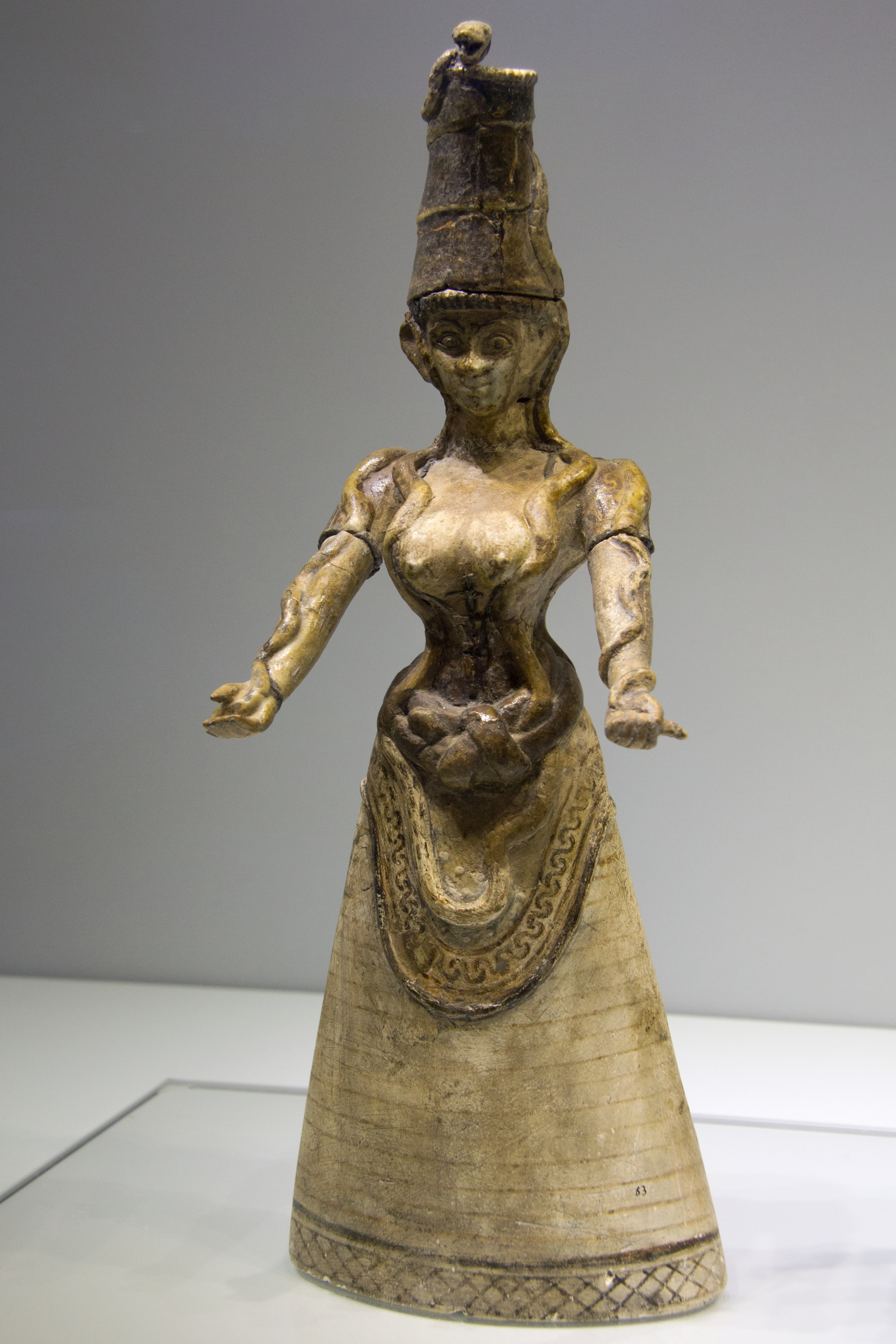
Minoan snake goddess figurines, c. 1600 BCE, Heraklion Archaeological Museum (AMH)

Two Minoan snake goddess figurines were excavated in 1903 in the Minoan palace at Knossos in the Greek island of Crete. The decades-long excavation programme led by the English archaeologist Arthur Evans greatly expanded knowledge and awareness of the Bronze Age Minoan civilization, but Evans has subsequently been criticised for overstatements and excessively speculative ideas, both in terms of his "restoration" of specific objects, including the most famous of these figures, and the ideas about the Minoans he drew from the archaeology. The figures are now on display at the Heraklion Archaeological Museum (AMH).

The Knossos figurines, both significantly incomplete, date to near the end of the neo-palatial period of Minoan civilization, around 1600 BCE. (Note: This is the boundary between Middle Minoan and Late Minoan.) It was Evans who called the larger of his pair of figurines a "Snake Goddess", the smaller a "Snake Priestess"; since then, it has been debated whether Evans was right, or whether both figurines depict priestesses, or both depict the same deity or distinct deities.

The combination of elaborate clothes that leave the breasts completely bare, and "snake-wrangling", attracted considerable publicity, not to mention various fakes, and the smaller figure in particular remains a popular icon for Minoan art and religion, now also generally referred to as a "Snake Goddess". But archaeologists have found few comparable images, and a snake goddess plays little part in current thinking about the cloudy topic of Minoan religion. Several scholars have also argued that these figurines are not really holding snakes in their hands, or as many snakes as Evans thought, but some other items.

== Knossos figurines ==
The two Knossos snake goddess figurines were found by Evans's excavators in one of a group of stone-lined and lidded cists. Evans called them "Temple Repositories", since they contained a variety of objects that were presumably no longer required for use, perhaps after a fire. The figurines are made of faience, a crushed quartz-paste material which after firing gives a true vitreous finish with bright colors and a lustrous sheen. This material symbolized the renewal of life in old Egypt, therefore it was used in the funeral cult and in the sanctuaries.

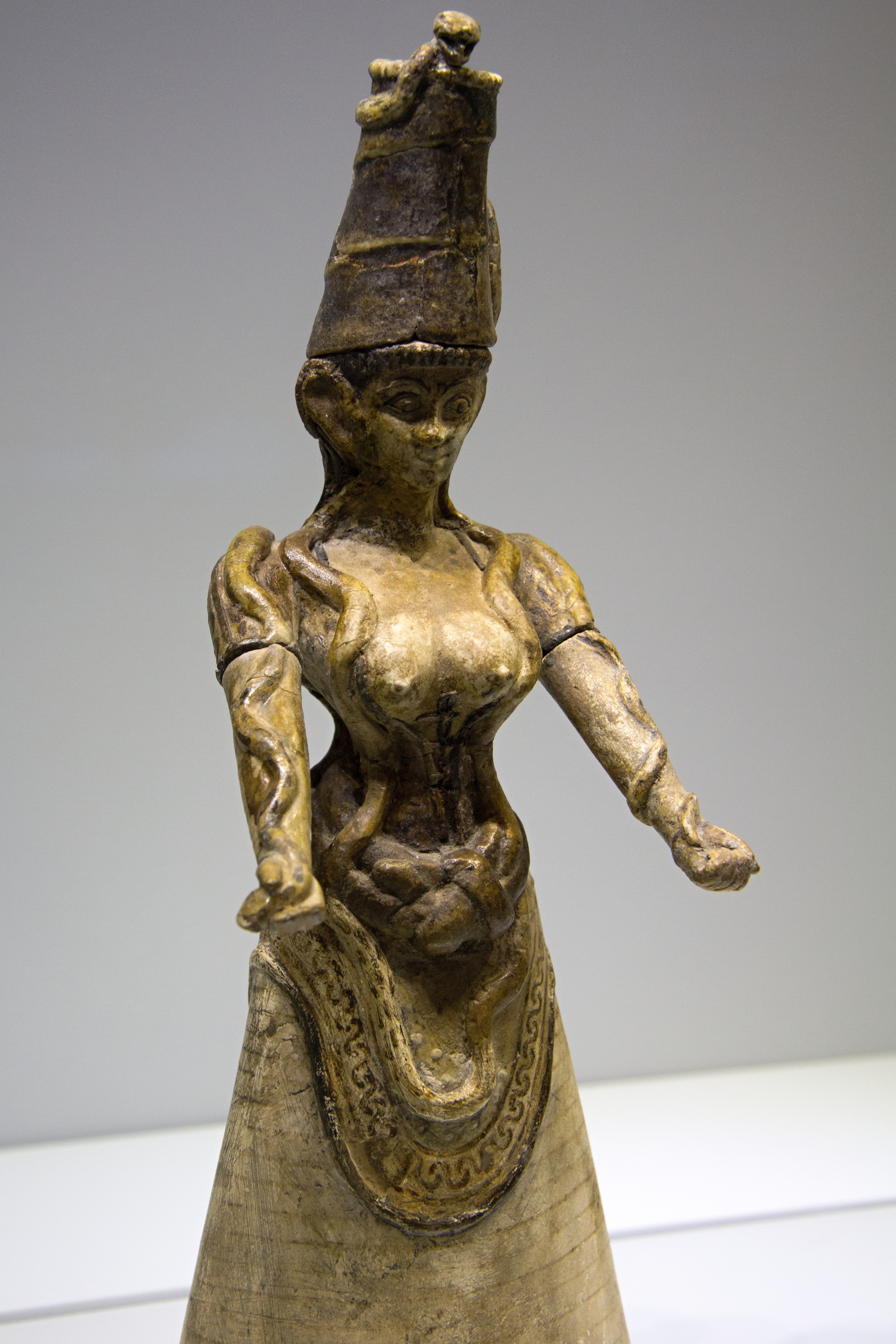
Detail of the larger Knossos figure; the parts below the waist are reconstructed.

The larger of these figures stands about 34 cm tall as restored; she has snakes crawling over her arms and up to her "tall cylindrical crown", at the top of which a snake's head rears up. The figure lacked the body below the waist, one arm, and part of the crown. She has prominent bare breasts, with what seems to be one or more snakes winding round them. Because of the missing pieces, it is not clear if it is one or more snakes around her arms. Her dress includes a thick belt with a "sacred knot".

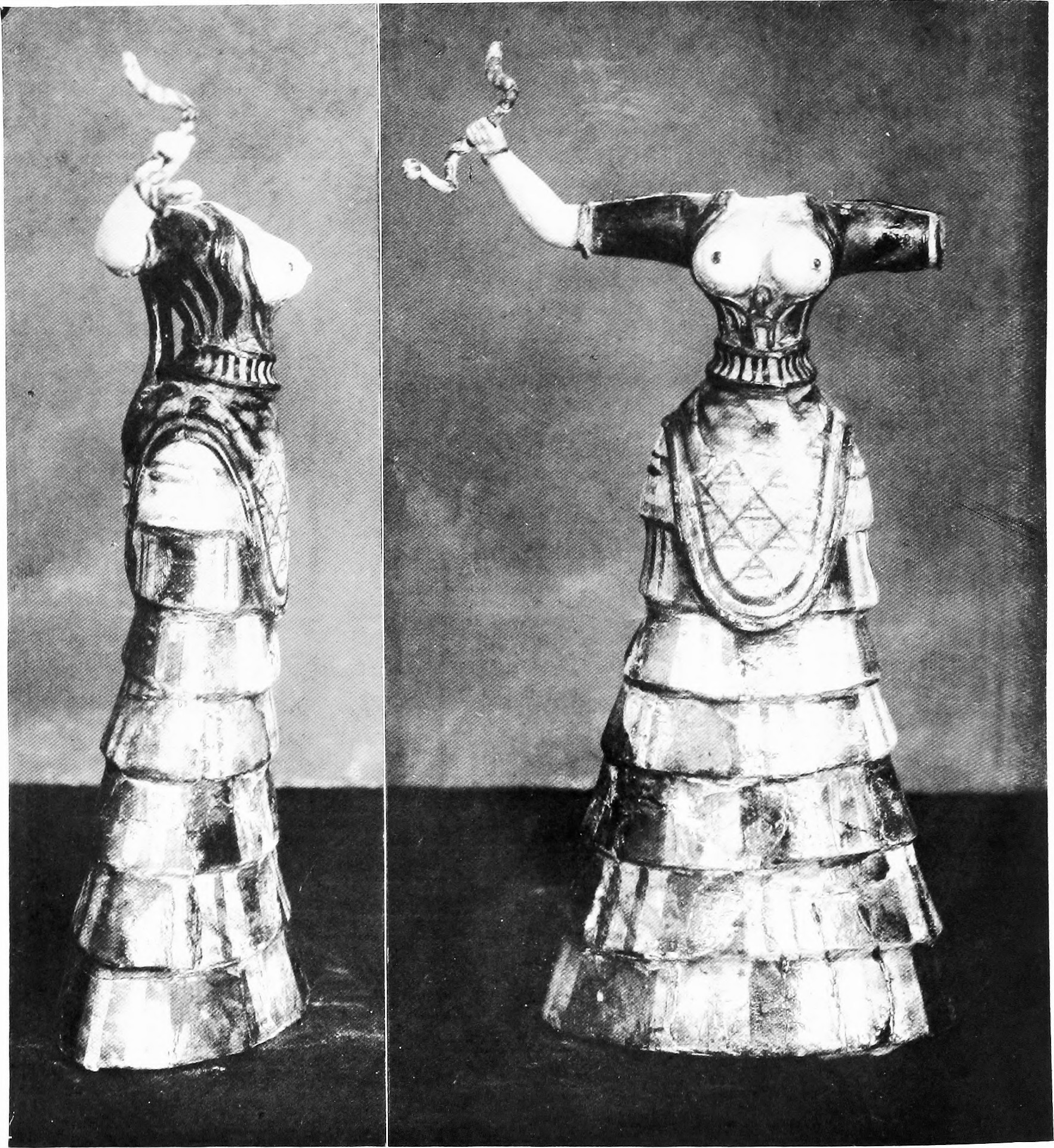
The smaller figure before "restoration"

The smaller figurine, as restored, stands about 29 cm tall; she holds two snakes in her raised hands, and the figure on her head-dress is a cat or panther. When excavated, the figurine lacked a head was missing the proper left arm below the elbow. The head was recreated by Evans and one of his restorers. The crown was an incomplete fragment in the same pit, and the cat/panther was another separate piece, which Evans decided only belonged to the figure some time later, partly because there seemed to be matching fittings on the crown and cat. Recent scholars seem somewhat more ready to accept that the hat and cat belong together than that either or both belong to the rest of the figure.

A third figure, intermediate in size, is broken off at the waist, but the lower part is comparable. The cist also contained another arm that might have held a snake.

== Other Minoan figures ==
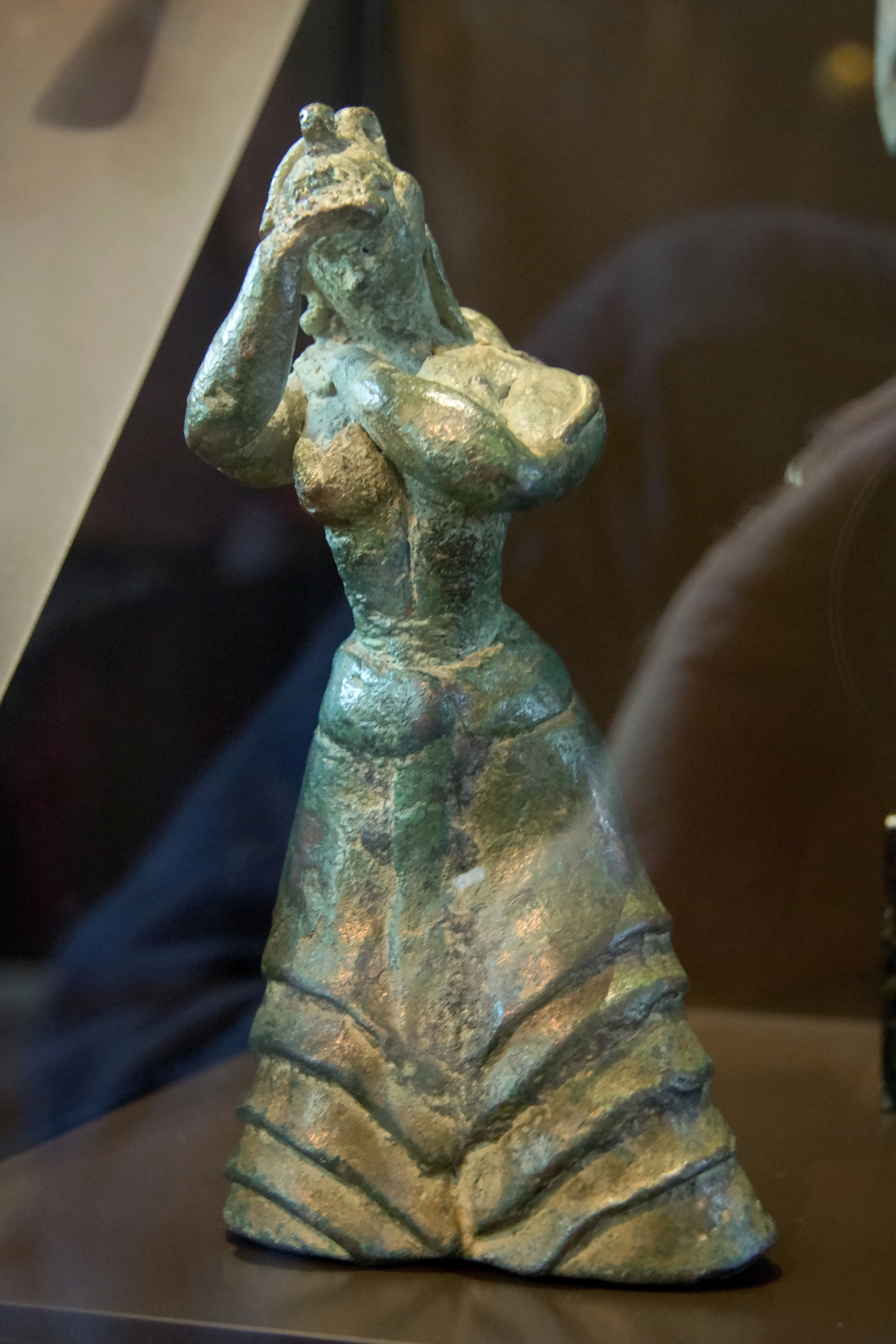
Bronze Minoan figure in Berlin, LM I, probably a worshipper, with either snakes or tresses of hair

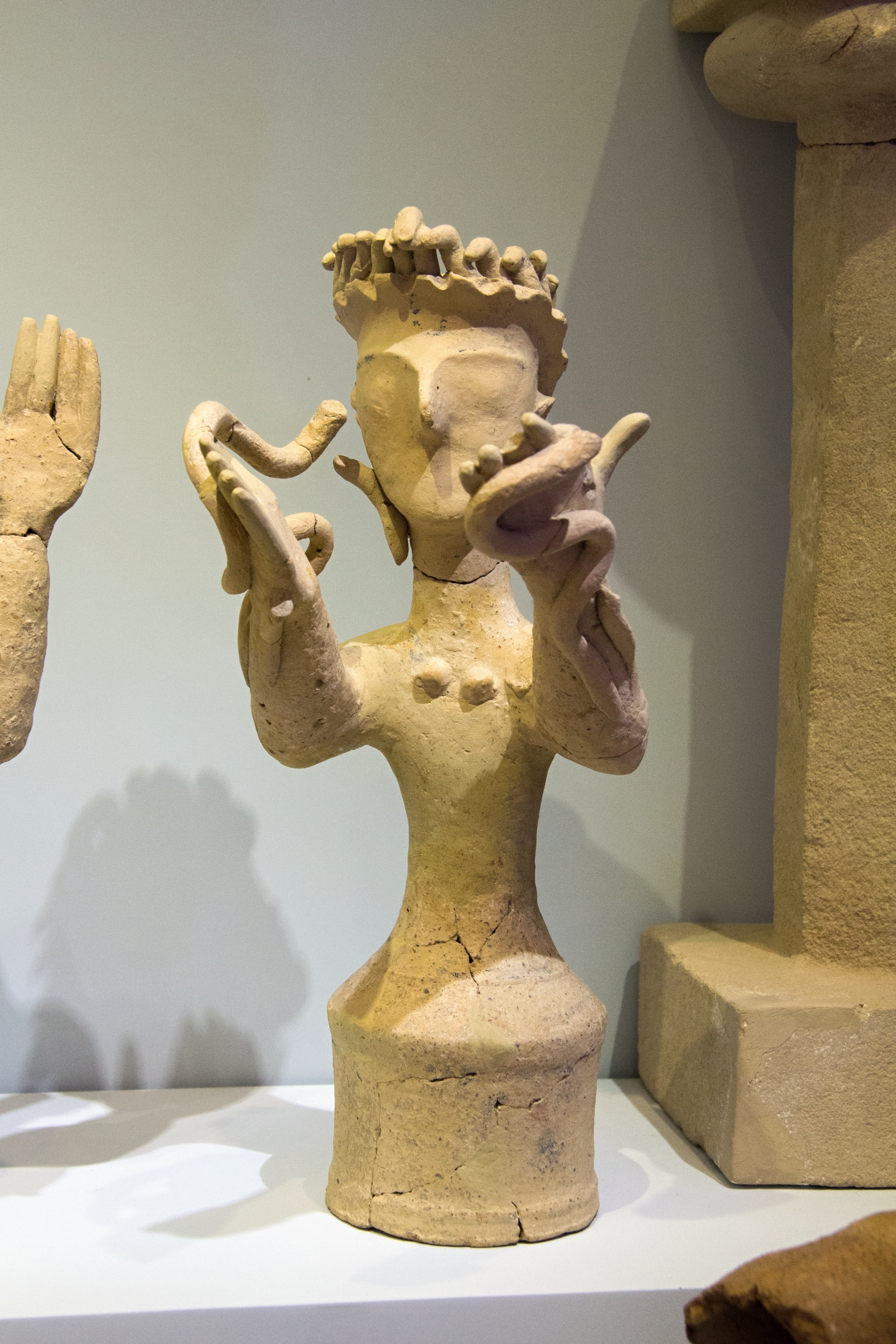
Minoan terracotta votive figure holding a snake or snakes, Kania, Gortyna, 1300-1200 BC, AMH

Another figurine now in Berlin, made of bronze, has on her head what may be three snakes, or just tresses of hair. She seems to be a priestess or worshipper rather than a deity, as she is stooped slightly forward, and making the Minoan worship gesture of a facepalm with one hand and the other brought up to the chest or, in this case, the throat. The one breast visible has a prominent nipple, so is presumably intended to be bare. This is probably Late Minoan I, rather later than the Knossos figures.

Later still are some terracotta votive offerings, probably representing the goddess rather than humans, in at least one case "snake-wrangling" and with snakes rising from the diadem or headress. This type of figure often has attributes rising from the headress, typified by the Poppy goddess (AMH).

== Fakes ==
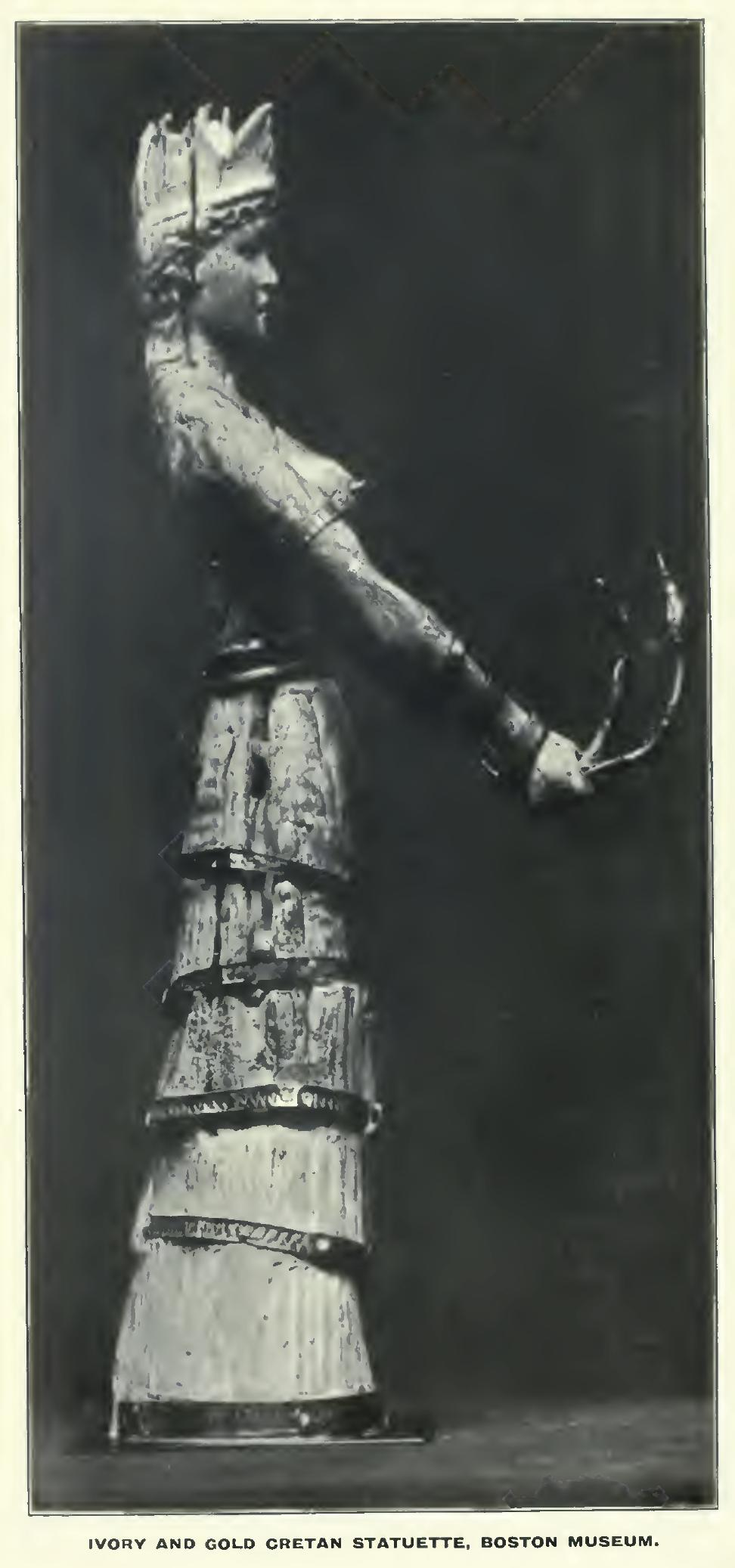
The Boston ivory and gold figure, probably a fake, pre-1914. Gold snakes coil round the arms.

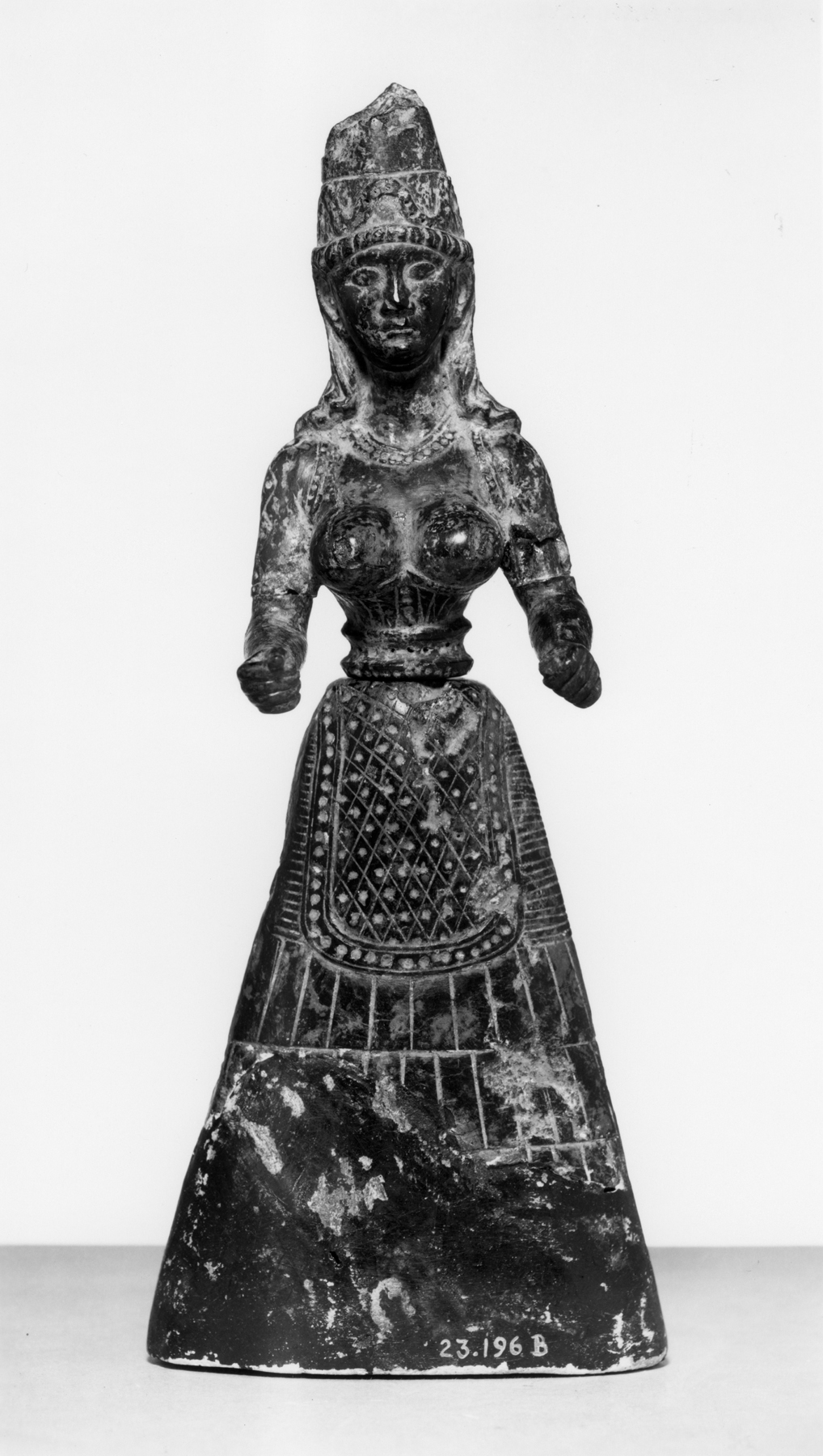
Baltimore stone figure, probably a fake, pre-1929. A snake winds round the headdress and the hands are pierced as if to hold snakes.

The tremendous impact of the Knossos figures, once published by Evans and in a book by the Italian doctor Angelo Mosso, quickly led to ingenious fakes. A figure in the Boston Museum of Fine Arts with an ivory body and gold snakes twined around the arms is now generally regarded as a fake. It was bought by the museum in 1914. (Note: Rodney Castleden regards it as "probably genuine".)

Another figure, in the Walters Art Museum in Baltimore, is a small steatite bare-breasted female figurine with a snake engraved around her headdress, and holes pierced through her clenched fists, presumably to suggest these held snakes. This is also now regarded as a fake. It was bought by Henry Walters from a dealer in Paris in 1929, and left to the museum in 1931.

== Interpretations ==
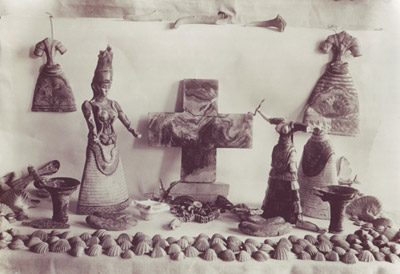
Evans' reconstruction of the "Snake Goddess Shrine": Objects from the Temple Repositories at Knossos, including the two figures, soon after discovery in 1903

Emily Bonney regards the figures as reflective of Syrian religion which had a brief impact on Crete, when "the elites at Knossos emulated Syrian iconography as an assertion of their access to exotic knowledge and control of trade."

The figurines are probably (according to Burkert) related to the Paleolithic traditions regarding women and domesticity. The figurines have also been interpreted as showing a mistress of animals-type goddess and as a precursor to Athena Parthenos, who is also associated with snakes.

Martin P. Nilsson states that in the Minoan religion the snake was the protector of the house, as it later appears also in Greek religion. Within the Greek Dionysiac cult it signified wisdom and was the symbol of fertility.

Barry Powell suggested that the "snake goddess" reduced in legend into a folklore heroine was Ariadne (whose name might mean "utterly pure" or "the very holy one"), who is often depicted surrounded by Maenads and satyrs. Hans Georg Wunderlich related the snake goddess with the Phoenician Astarte (virgin daughter). She was the goddess of fertility and sexuality and her worship was connected with an orgiastic cult. Her temples were decorated with serpentine motifs. In a related Greek myth Europa, who is sometimes identified with Astarte in ancient sources, was a Phoenician princess whom Zeus abducted and carried to Crete. Evans tentatively linked the snake goddess with the Egyptian snake goddess Wadjet but did not pursue this connection. Statuettes similar to the "snake goddess" type identified as "priest of Wadjet" and "magician" were found in Egypt.

While the statuette's true function is somewhat unclear, her exposed and amplified breasts suggest that she is probably some sort of fertility figure. The figurines may illustrate the fashion of dress of Minoan women, however, it is also possible that bared breasts represented a sign of mourning. Homer gives a literary description of this kind of mourning, and this was also observed by Herodotus among Egyptian women.

The snake goddess's Minoan name may be related with A-sa-sa-ra, a possible interpretation of inscriptions found in Linear A texts. Although Linear A is not yet deciphered, Palmer relates tentatively the inscription a-sa-sa-ra-me which seems to have accompanied goddesses, with the Hittite išhaššara, which means "mistress".

Emily Bonney argues that the goddess is not holding the snakes at all, and thus could not be seen as a "Snake Goddess". Instead, "she stands with arms raised, holding either end of what appears to be a long cord that hangs nearly to her feet". This fits well with the Syrian iconographic tradition of similar images as in the Figure 10 of her article. Citing Nanno Marinatos, she argues that these images were meant to represent the goddess opening her skirt to display her sexuality.

According to Bonney:

In any case, HM 65 [Evans' famous reconstructed statuette] is not holding a snake, but a spirally-striped object that could not have been a snake, as Evans knew. [...] [He] knew that snakes never have 'peppermint stripes'. Indeed the textured surface of the upper original portion of the 'serpent' seems to reflect the craftsman's intent to depict a twisted object such as a rope or cord.

=== Sacral knot ===
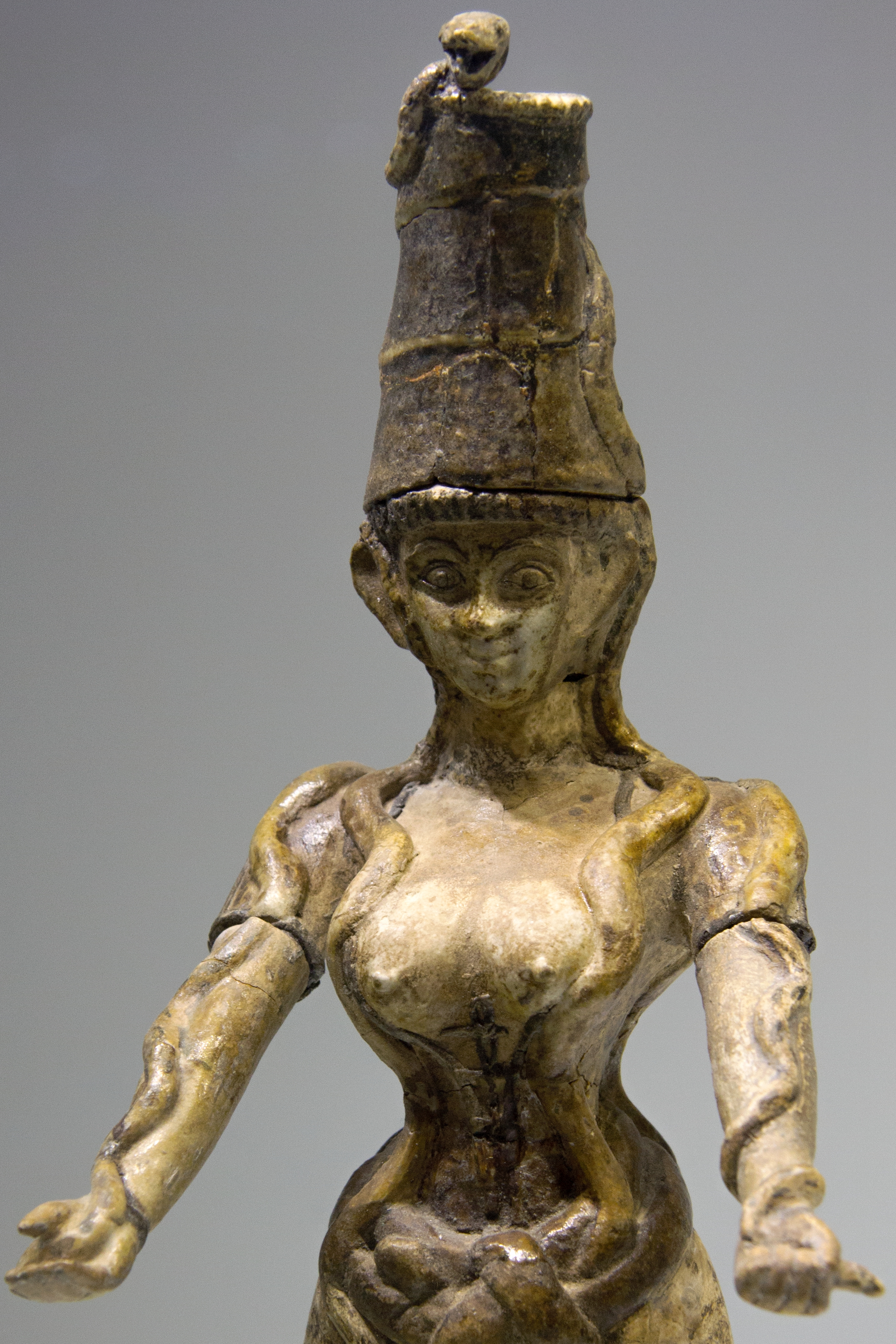
Detail of the larger Knossos figure

Both goddesses have a knot with a projecting looped cord between their breasts. Evans noticed that these are analogous to the sacral knot, his name for a knot with a loop of fabric above and sometimes fringed ends hanging down below. Numerous such symbols in ivory, faience, painted in frescoes or engraved in seals sometimes combined with the symbol of the double-edged axe or labrys which was the most important Minoan religious symbol. Such symbols were found in Minoan and Mycenaean sites. It is believed that the sacral knot was the symbol of holiness on human figures or cult-objects. Its combination with the double-axe can be compared with the Egyptian ankh (eternal life), or with the tyet (welfare/life) a symbol of Isis (the knot of Isis).

== Influence ==
The 1979 feminist artwork The Dinner Party by Judy Chicago features a place setting for a "Snake Goddess".

== Gallery ==
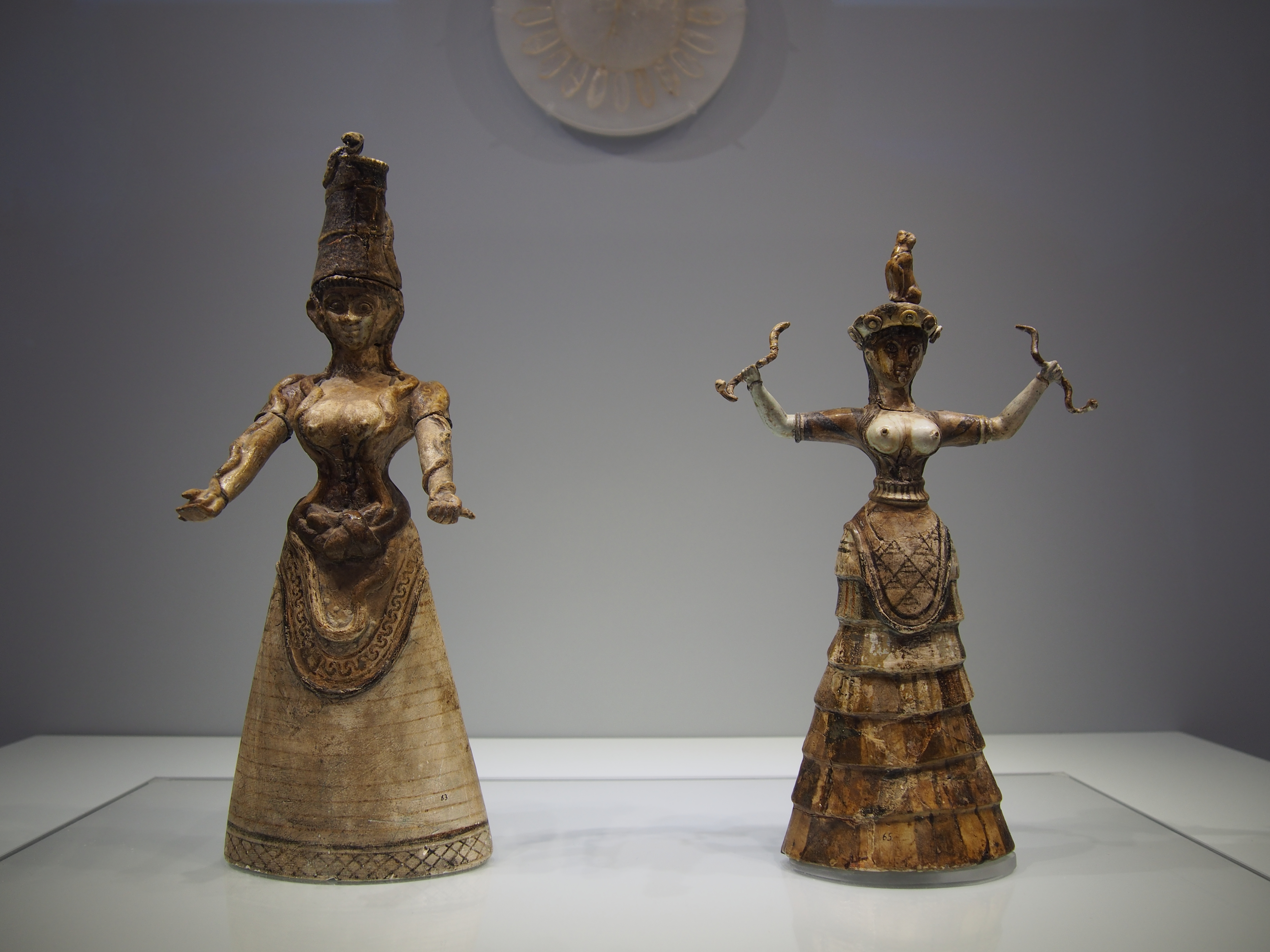
Both figurines on display at the Heraklion Archaeological Museum, Crete

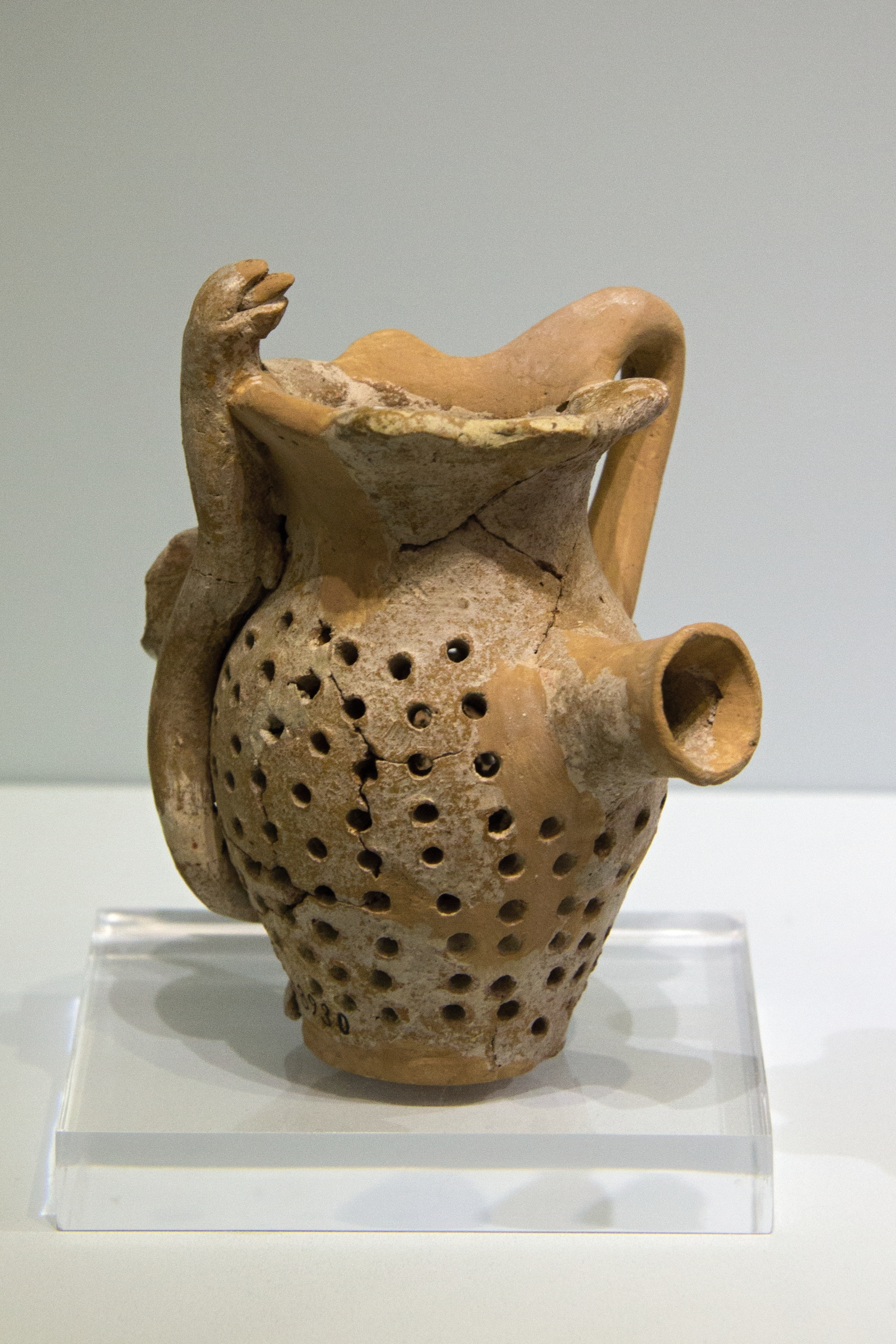
Pot, probably a stand for rhytons, with snake, Knossos, 1700-1600 BC, AMH

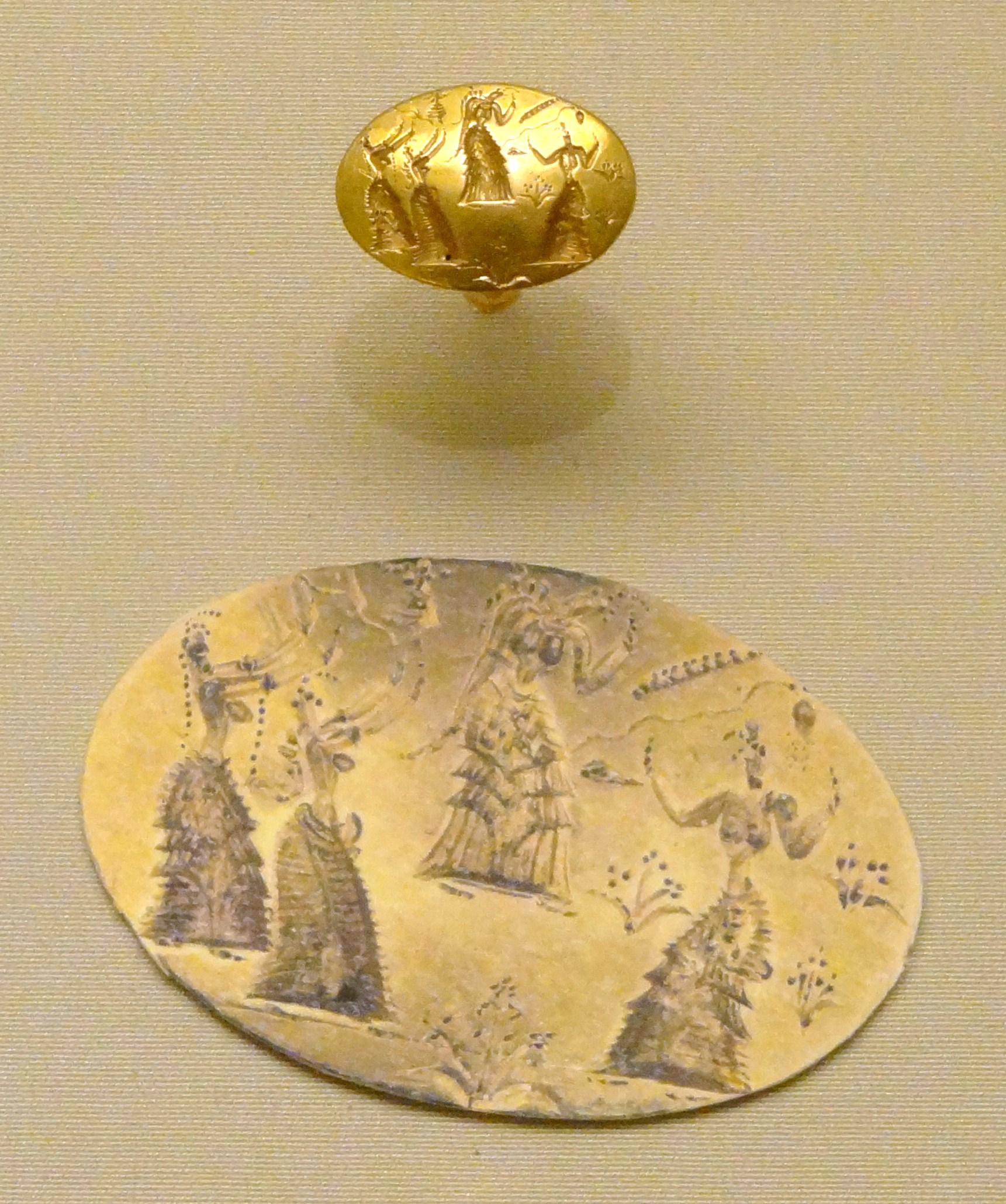
Gold ring & blow-up. Four women with similar dress. The wavy line about the woman at far right has been called a snake.

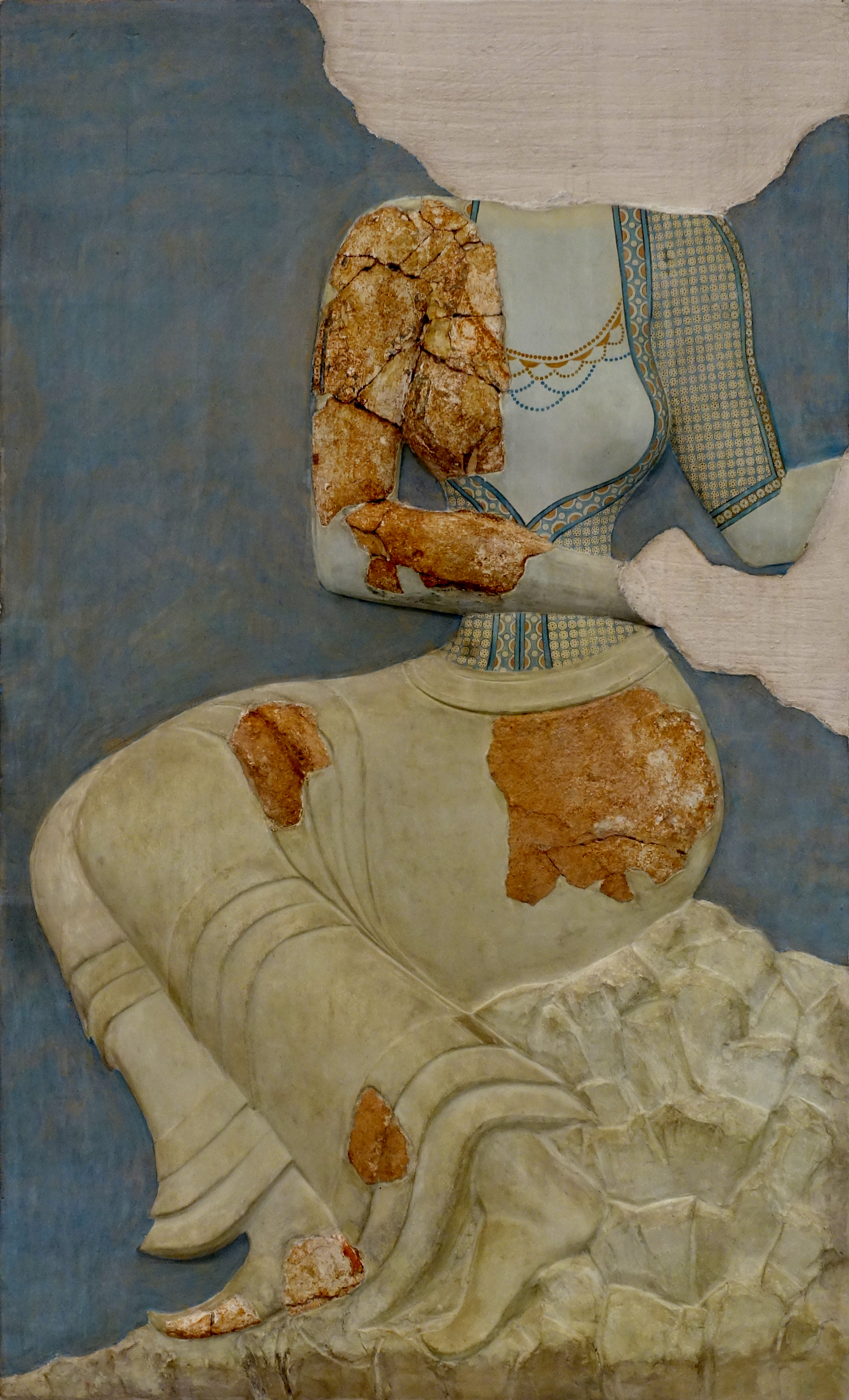
Largely reconstructed relief fresco of a (?) goddess from Psira; one of the few figures with comparable bodices

== See also ==
- Ishtar
- Wadjet
- Gorgon (female monsters with sharp fangs and hair of living, venomous snakes in Greek mythology)
- Maenads (female snake-handling followers and maddened victims of Dionysos)
- Master of Animals
- Matriarchal religion
- Snake worship (in Hindu mythology)
- Revadim Asherah
