= Snake goddess =

A snake goddess is a goddess associated with a snake theme.

Examples include:

- Meretseger ("She Who Loves Silence"), an Egyptian snake goddess
- Minoan snake goddess figurines, Minoan archaeological artifacts
- Medusa (to guard, to protect), a Greek goddess
- Naga Kanya ("Maiden of Snakes"), a Hindu goddess depicted as a celestial girl with a serpentine lower body
- Renenutet ("She Who Nourishes"), an Egyptian snake goddess
- Wadjet ("Green One"), an Egyptian snake goddess
- Nagapooshani ("She Who Wears Snakes as Her Jewellery"), a Sri Lankan snake goddess who is often recognized by her cobra (Shesha)
- Manasa, Indian snake goddess

== See also ==
- Snake worship
