= Khirbet el-Qom =

Archaeological site in the West Bank

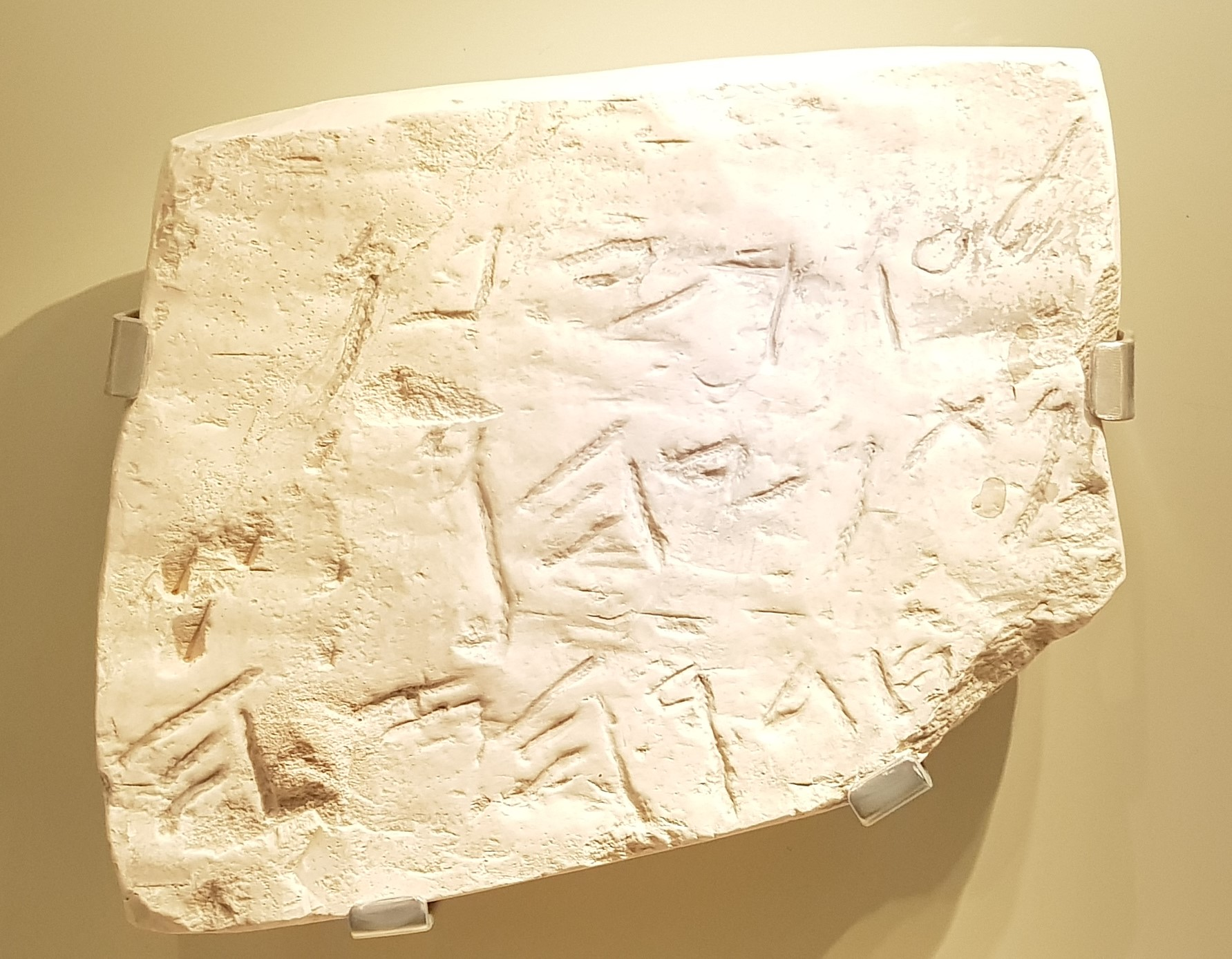
- One of the burial inscription from the site

- Location within the West Bank
- 31°32′4.98″N 34°57′59.63″E
- Periods: Early Bronze Age - Hellenistic period
- Cultures: Canaanite, Israelite, Edomite, Second Temple Judaism
- Location: al-Kum, West Bank, Palestine

History
- Built: 20 BCE

Site notes
- Excavation dates: 1967-8
- Archaeologists: William G. Dever
- Condition: In ruins
- Public access: yes

Khirbet el-Qom (Arabic: خربة الكوم) is an archaeological site in the village of al-Kum, West Bank, in the territory of the biblical Kingdom of Judah, between Lachish and Hebron, 14 km (8.7 mi) to the west of the latter.

Remains from the site dating to the Second Temple period include hundreds of Aramaic ostraca, what appears to be a 4th-century BCE shrine dedicated to Yahweh, and a burial cave featuring Hebrew inscriptions dating from the 1st century BCE to the 2nd century CE.

== Excavations ==
In the 1930s, Yitzhak Ben-Zvi visited Khirbet al-Qum and stayed at the residence of Sheikh Suleiman from the Irgum family. Suleiman, the owner of the ruins at the site, said they had Jewish origins. He expressed interest in dating the site and inquired whether it was referenced in the Torah.

Archaeological excavations were conducted at the site in 1967 by William G. Dever on behalf of the Hebrew Union College.

== Findings ==
=== Iron Age ===
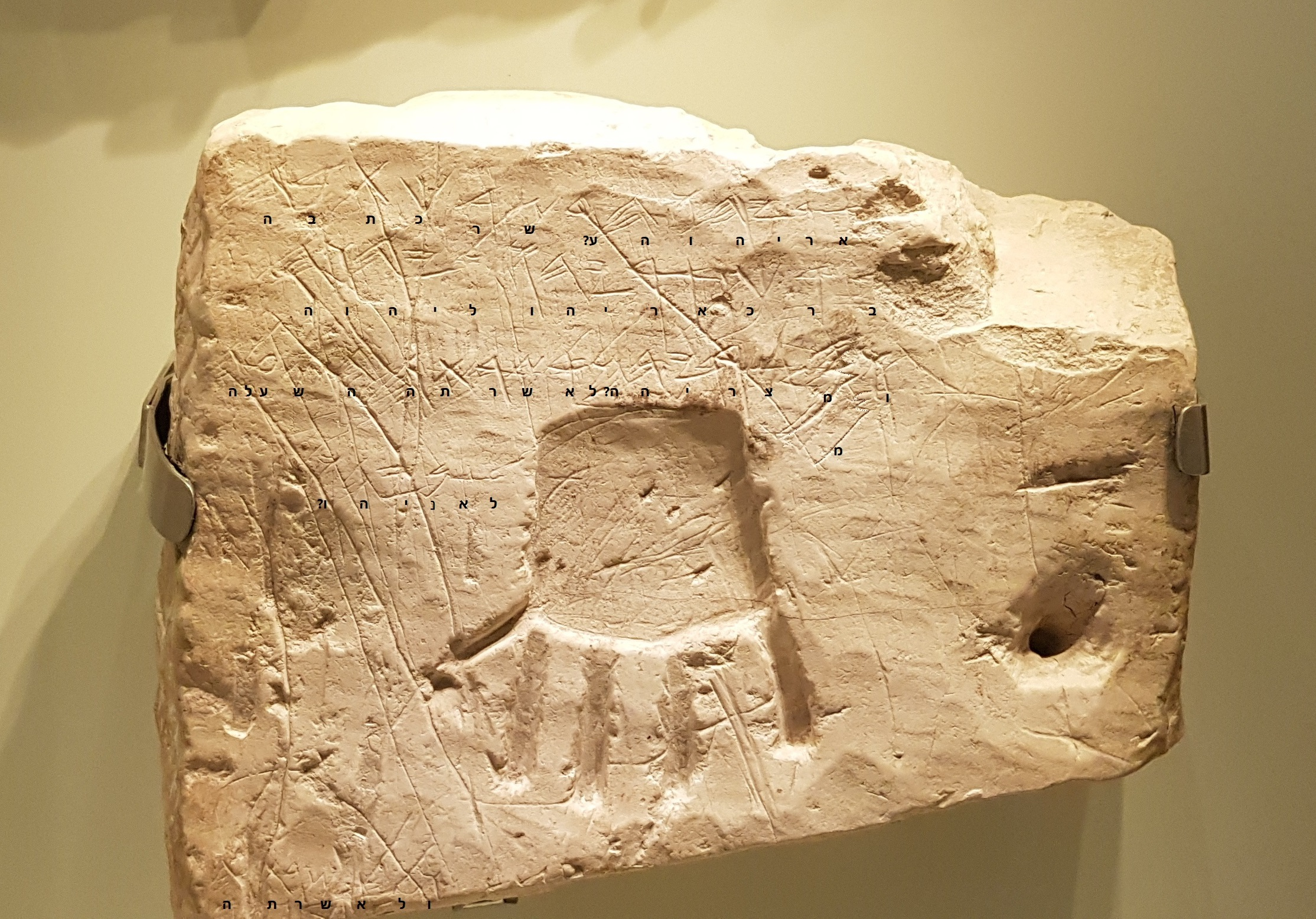
Uriyahu inscription

Two Iron Age bench tombs carved into natural rock were discovered at el-Qom; both were investigated by William Dever in 1967 following their discovery by tomb robbers. Both tombs contain inscriptions, dating from the second half of the 8th century BCE, slightly after the Asheratic Kuntillet Ajrud inscriptions. The inscription from Tomb 2 is associated with a "magic hand" symbol, and reads:

"Uriyahu the honourable has written this
Blessed is/be Uriyahu by Yahweh
And [because?] from his oppressors by his asherah he has saved him
[written] by Oniyahu"
"...by his Asherah
...and his Asherah"

Unlike the Kuntillet Ajrud inscriptions, this inscription do not include a place name with the name of Yahweh (the Kuntillet Ajrud inscriptions talk of "Yahweh of Samaria" and "Yahweh of Teman"); this seems to indicate that they were written after the fall of Samaria, which left Yahweh as the god of one state only.

the inscriptions from Khirbet el-Qom and Kuntillet Ajrud, along with great Levantine archives such as Ebla archive, Ugarit archive and Mari archive, were important factors in the reconceptualization of the ancient Israelite religion and its understanding as a part and parcel of its Near Eastern/Levantine/West Semitic/Canaanite environment.

There is some scholarly debate about the translation, particularly for line three.

A jug inscribed "to/for Yahmol" and a bowl inscribed "El" were also found.

=== Persian and Hellenistic periods ===
One thousand seven hundred ostraca in Aramaic may have been found on the site and the vicinity, dating from the Persian and Hellenistic periods, during which the area was classified as the Persian province of Idumea, with a mixed population of Edomites, Jews and Arabs. The site is called Maqqedah in the Idumean ostraca. Based on this, some scholars identify Khirbet el-Qom with biblical Makkedah (Joshua 10:10, 16, 17, 21, 28, 29; 12:16; 15:41).

Khirbet el-Qom may have housed a Yahwistic shrine in the 4th century BCE, likely serving the small Judean population of northern Idumea, making it one of three known Yahwistic shrines in ancient Israel during this period, alongside the Second Temple in Jerusalem and the Samaritan Temple on Mount Gerizim.

=== Roman period ===
A burial cave in El-Qom contained three Hebrew funerary inscriptions dating from the 1st century BCE to the 2nd century CE, bearing names such as Miriam and Shalom. Currently, they are housed in the Israel Antiquities Authority storage facilities in Beit Shemesh.

== Identification ==
Based on the findings and the possible name preservation of the ancient name in the adjacent valley of Wadi es-Safir, it has been suggested that Khirbet el-Qum is Shafir, a place mentioned in the Book of Micah (1:11).

== See also ==
- Revadim Asherah
- Biblical archaeology
- Cities of the ancient Near East
- History of ancient Israel and Judah
- Kuntillet Ajrud inscriptions - similarly judean and roughly contemporaneous epigraphy

== External ==
- https://flickr.com/photos/101561334@N08/42499423444/in/photostream/ high resolution public domain photo

== Bibliography ==
- Zevit, Ziony (1984). "The Khirbet el-Qôm Inscription Mentioning a Goddess". Bulletin of the American Schools of Oriental Research (255). American Schools of Oriental Research: 39–47. doi:10.2307/1357074. ISSN 0003-097X. JSTOR 1357074.
