= Judean pillar figure =

Figurines used in 8th-7th century Judah, often associated with fertility rituals

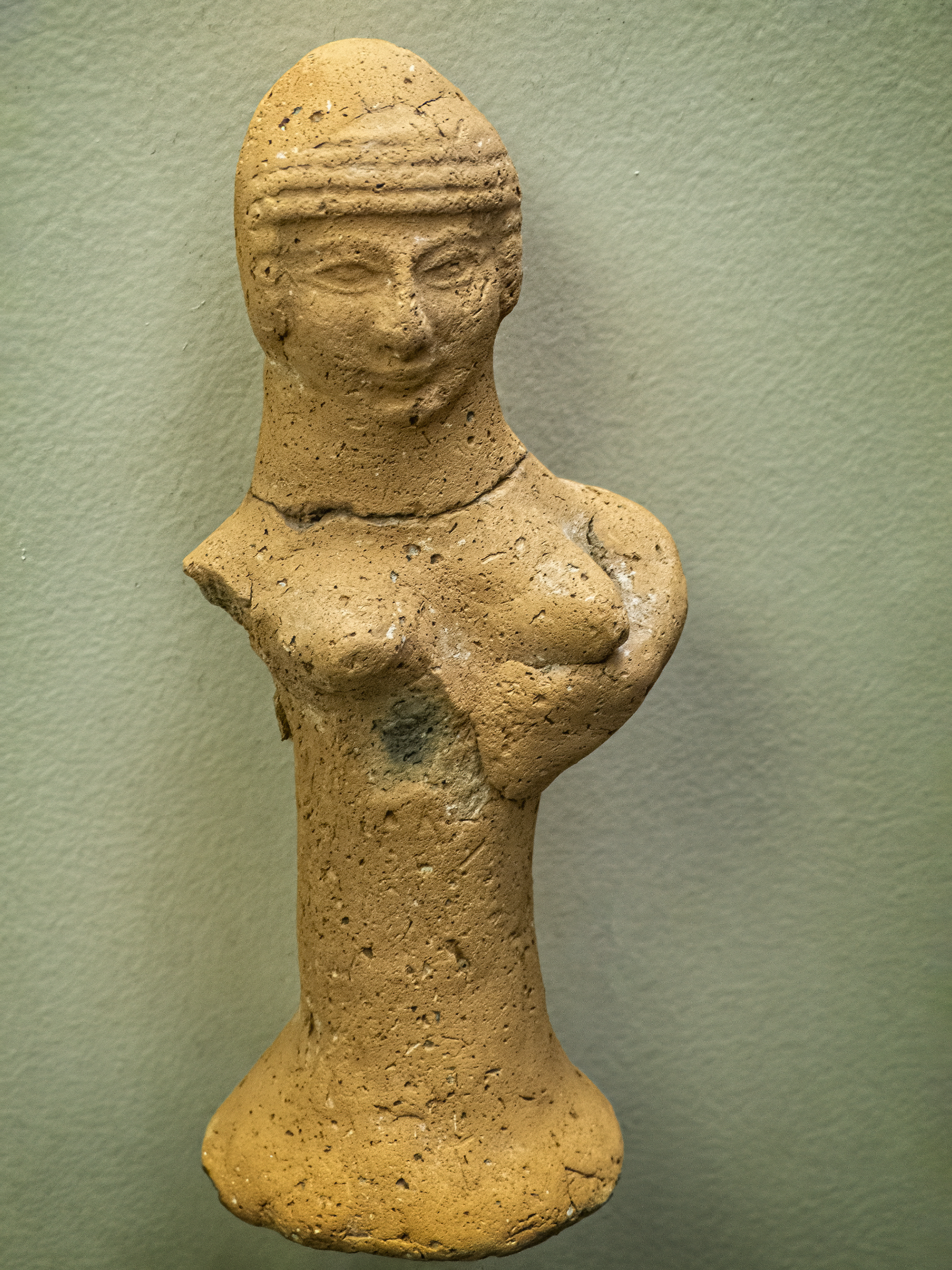
The unusually characterful facial details here reflect mass manufacture.

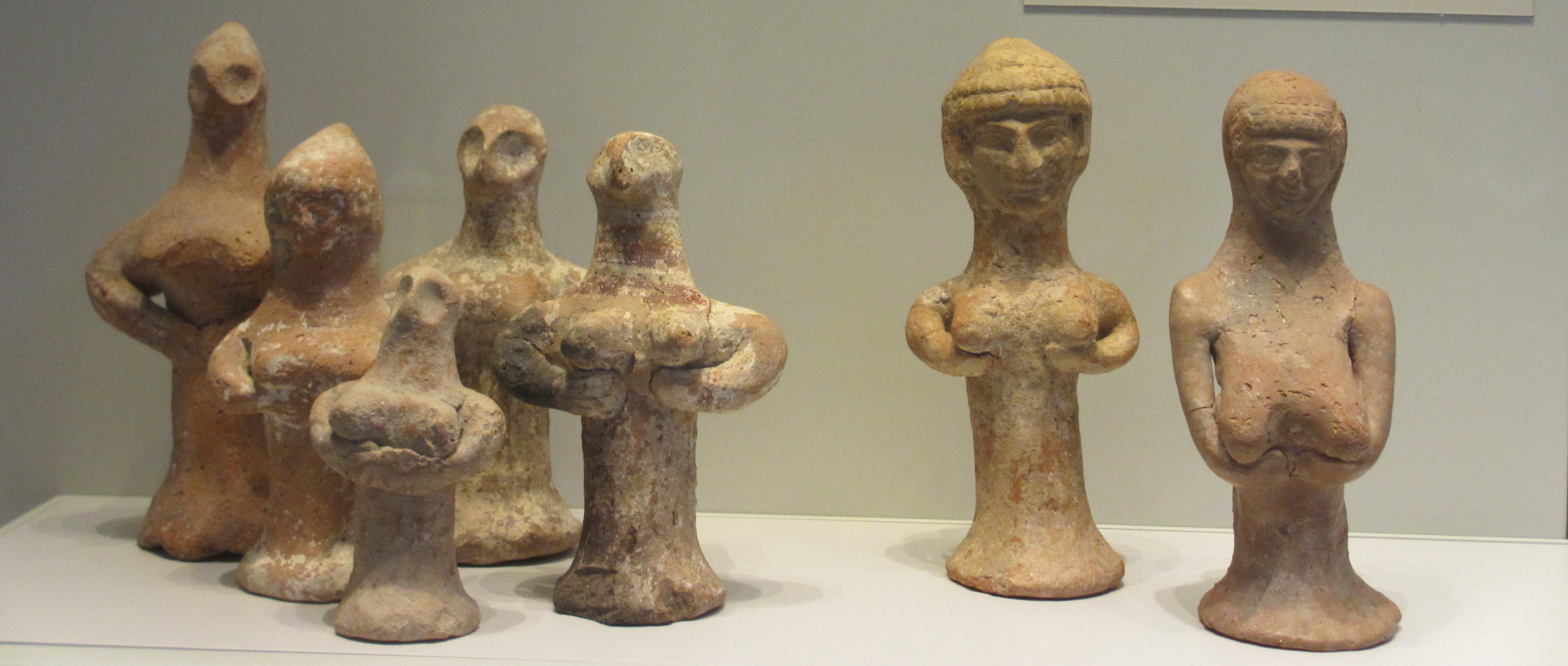
The vanishingly rare pendulous-breasted example on the right

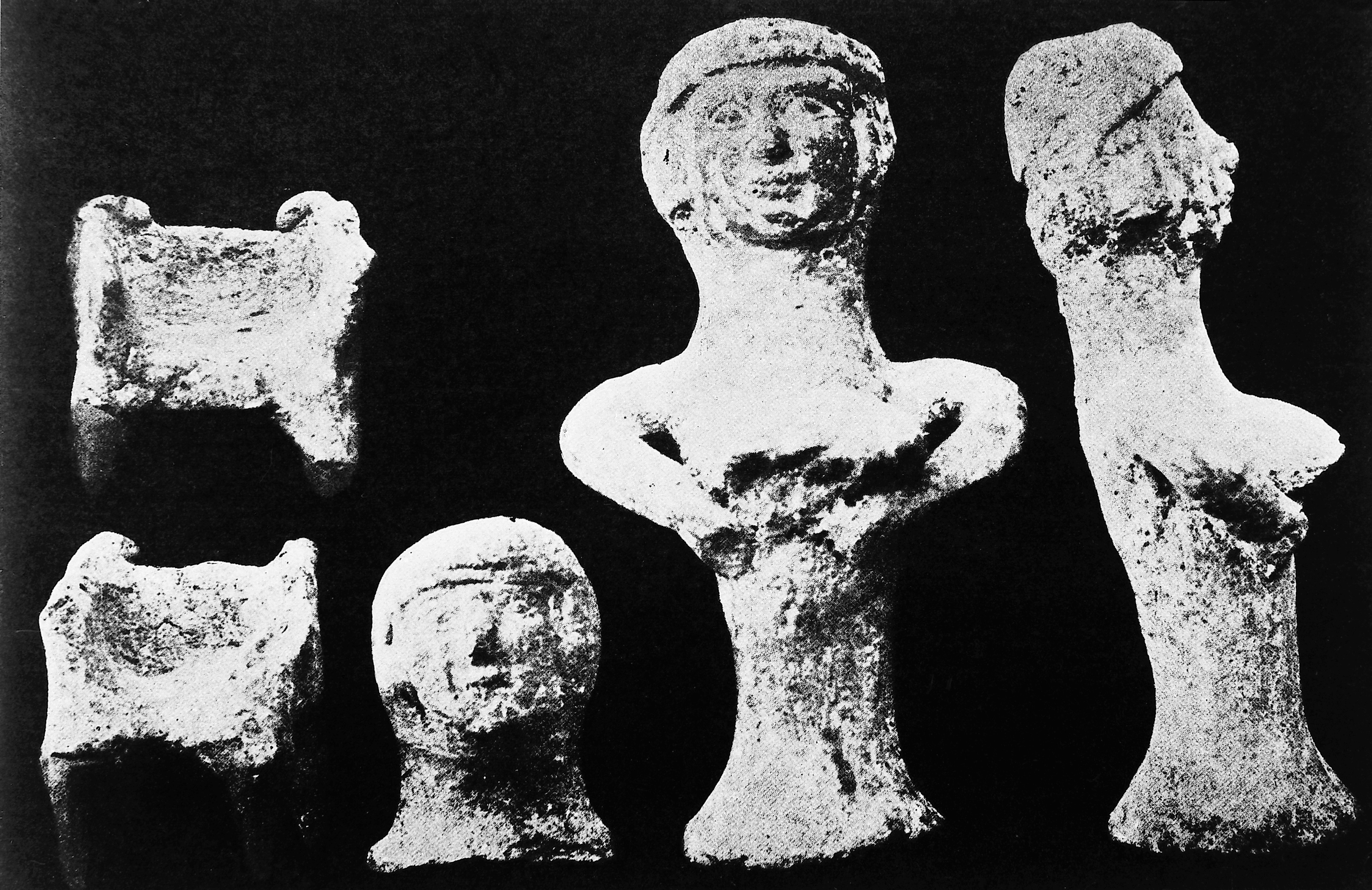
"The almost universal absence of the beard suggests... that the artists were principally concerned with female figures," Macalister deduced.

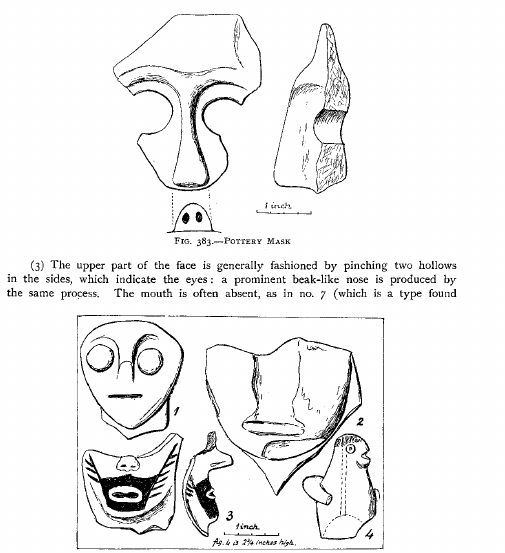
The pinched-nose technique results in similar visages over epochs

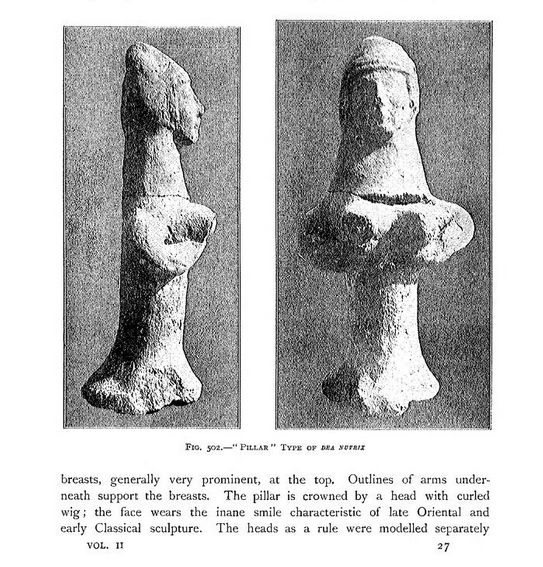
"The face wears the inane smile..."

Judean pillar figures or figurines are ceramic representations commonly found in domestic contexts in Judah during the Iron Age, particularly in the 8th and 7th centuries BCE. These figurines feature a female form with a prominent depiction of breasts and a simple, stylized shape, often omitting a lower torso. The pillar base, from which they derive their name, serves as a pedestal for the figure.

These figurines have been widely interpreted as representations of the Semitic goddess Asherah, associated with fertility and childbirth. However, there is ongoing debate regarding their exact identity. Some scholars argue that they are votive offerings representing women praying for fertility, while others maintain they depict the goddess herself. Found primarily in household contexts (rather than public shrines), these figurines were likely used in private rituals to invoke divine blessings or to encourage fertility in the face of the looming threat of Assyrian invasion.

== Details ==
Scholarly consensus has categorized the figurines as the goddess Asherah, important in Canaanite religion. Dissenting from this view, Erin Darby suggests other possible identifications. The figures have some facial detail, protruding breasts, and completely plain cylindrical bodies below. Surely popular, they were often handmade and sometimes crude, which led to a diversity of style. It also allowed them currency over a longer period of time, unlike the more sophisticated but late Revadim Asherah, whose examples were mass-produced in the productive milieu leading up to the Late Bronze Age collapse.

Pillar figures are first found in small numbers around Judea in the 10th century BCE, then grew somewhat in geographic distribution and greatly in attestation. A single archaeological site could reveal them in the hundreds like in Jerusalem, or over a thousand like in Kuntillet Ajrud, so museums and universities contain a great number.

The head and cylinder body are usually separate pieces with a pin. They usually have almond-shaped eyes and a slightly twisted "teardrop" curl hairstyle, sometimes with a pinched-nose or bird-headed appearance, sometimes with clues of paint. Tel Megiddo and Tel Lachish had the less common examples from molds; i.e. mass-produced. "The hollow bodied figurines... appear to be typically Philistine."

It is likely they were dressed. Some show hermaphroditic or androgynous characteristics. Five "male" Judean pillar figures are mentioned in Kletter.

== Scholarship ==
The first cataloging attempt by Pilz included less than a dozen JPF examples and little analysis. The figures were originally half of a broad classification under two categories of goddess image: JPFs that stand on a pole-like base and plaque figures that lie flat. (That is, they cannot be "in the round".) Then came the discovery and gradual publication depictions of Revadim Asherah from the 13th century.

The plaque figures in the Levant are familiar to an earlier-still Egyptian tradition. The supine goddesses, more like portraits to view than dolls to hold, are made in gold by artisans for the wealthiest from Egypt and the early Eurasian Steppe to later Achaemenid primacy. For plaques see Negbi 1976 and Budin 2016.

The first major work was theologian Kletter's in 1995. Ron E. Tappy's take on it was rather excoriating, showing that Asherah-related controversy still divides peers in the academy today.

According to Ryan Byrne, it is possible that the figurines were adopted to encourage fertility in response to the mounting Neo-Assyrian threat of exile and destruction.

== See also ==
- Revadim Asherah
- Euphrates Syrian Pillar Figurines

== Bibliography ==
- Beaulieu, Stéphane (2007-01-01). "Eve's Ritual: the Judahite Sacred Marriage Rite". Concordia University.
- Darby, Erin (2018). "Judean Pillar Figurines (JPFs)". In Farber, Zev I.; Wright, Jacob L. (eds.). Archaeology and History of Eighth-century Judah (PDF). SBL Press. ISBN 978-0-88414-347-5.
