= Hamsa =

Palm-shaped amulet

A version of the hamsa symbol

The hamsa (Arabic خمسة khamsa (Note: lit. 'five', referring to images of 'the five fingers of the hand')), also romanized khamsa, and known as the hand of Fatima, is a palm-shaped amulet popular throughout North Africa and in the Middle East and commonly used in jewellery and wall hangings. Depicting the open hand, an image recognized and used as a sign of protection in many times throughout history, the hamsa is believed to provide defense against the evil eye.

== Terminology and etymology ==
The standard name is "khamsa" (Arabic "five"), with Maghrebi variants "khmisa"/"khmisa". In French colonial North Africa, Europeans popularized the label "Hand of Fatima" (French: "Main de Fatma") - a colonial nickname rather than an indigenous Arabic term; (Note: Popular explanations that link the five fingers to the Five Pillars, or that identify the amulet intrinsically with Fatima, are later accretions rather than original meanings of the symbol.) in colonial-era French, "fatma" referred to a Muslim or Arab woman. In Jewish usage it is also called the "Hand of Miriam" in Sephardi-Mizrahi contexts, or sometime hamesh (Hebrew "five"). Among Levantine Christians it is known as the "Hand of Mary" (Arabic: "kef Miryam"). In the Berber languages, the term "afus", which denotes a decorative motif similar to the hamsa, literally means "hand".

== History ==
=== Origin ===
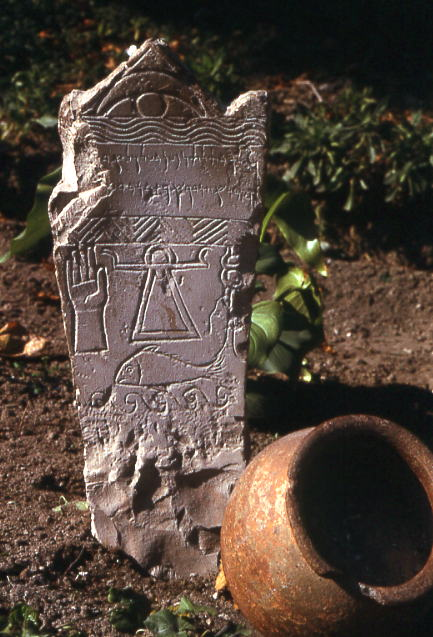
A Punic stela from Carthage dedicated to Tinnit and Baal Hammon with a carved open right hand, as well as sign of Tinnit, sign of Baal Hammon above, Caduceus and naval symbols

Open-hand motifs, sometimes interpreted as apotropaic, are widely attested in the ancient Near East. Vervenne notes that the hand symbol is very common in the Near East and may, in some interpretations, be regarded as an antecedent of the protective khamsa. Von Kemnitz also notes that amulets representing the hand of Ishtar were used in Mesopotamia and Babylon to prevent evil or disease from entering a building. Another early piece of evidence often associated with this symbolic history is that of Khirbet el-Qom, in Judah, where an Iron Age tomb bears an engraved hand associated with an inscription. The exact meaning of this motif remains debated, but it is generally interpreted as a protective sign in a funerary context.

Another theory postulates a connection between the khamsa and the Mano Pantea (or Hand-of-the-All-Goddess), an amulet known to ancient Egyptians as the Two Fingers. In this amulet, the Two Fingers represent Isis and Osiris and the thumb represents their child Horus. It was used to invoke the protective spirits of parents over their child. The Hand-of-Venus (or Aphrodite) and the Hand-of-Mary, were other names for hand amulets used to protect women from the evil eye and/or boost fertility and lactation, promote healthy pregnancies and strengthen the weak.

The symbol of a facing hand found on Nabataean coin types has been associated with the hamsa.

=== Medieval Iberia and the Maghreb ===
According to von Kemnitz, "the Berbers brought the khamsa to al-Andalūs. Later, the expelled Muslim and Jewish population took it back to North Africa, introducing different motifs and techniques."

Within the Islamic world, historical use of the amulet is concentrated in the western Muslim world (Maghreb; historically al-Andalus), while attestations in the eastern Muslim world (Mashriq) are sparse; where a "hand" appears in eastern contexts it is often part of distinct Shi'i ritual iconography rather than the Maghrebi amulet tradition. "In al-Andalūs, the use of the hamsa as amulet is well-documented from the thirteenth century onwards. This chronology would relate the use of this amulet to an increased Berber presence and their cultural influence".

Among the Morisco population of Granada and nearby regions, khamsa pendants were particularly popular and were described as "large engraved medals ... with a hand inscribed with letters", likely containing Qurʾanic verses or expressions derived from the holy text that reinforced their apotropaic function. Ecclesiastical authorities sought to suppress their use: a reform council in 1526 banned khamsas as Islamic symbols and ordered their replacement by Christian crosses, while the Synod of Guadix renewed the prohibition in 1554. Despite this, khamsas were also worn by Christians, such as a Nasrid-period gold pendant inscribed Ave Maria gratia plena, illustrating their cross-confessional appeal.

== Religious interpretations ==
=== In Judaism ===
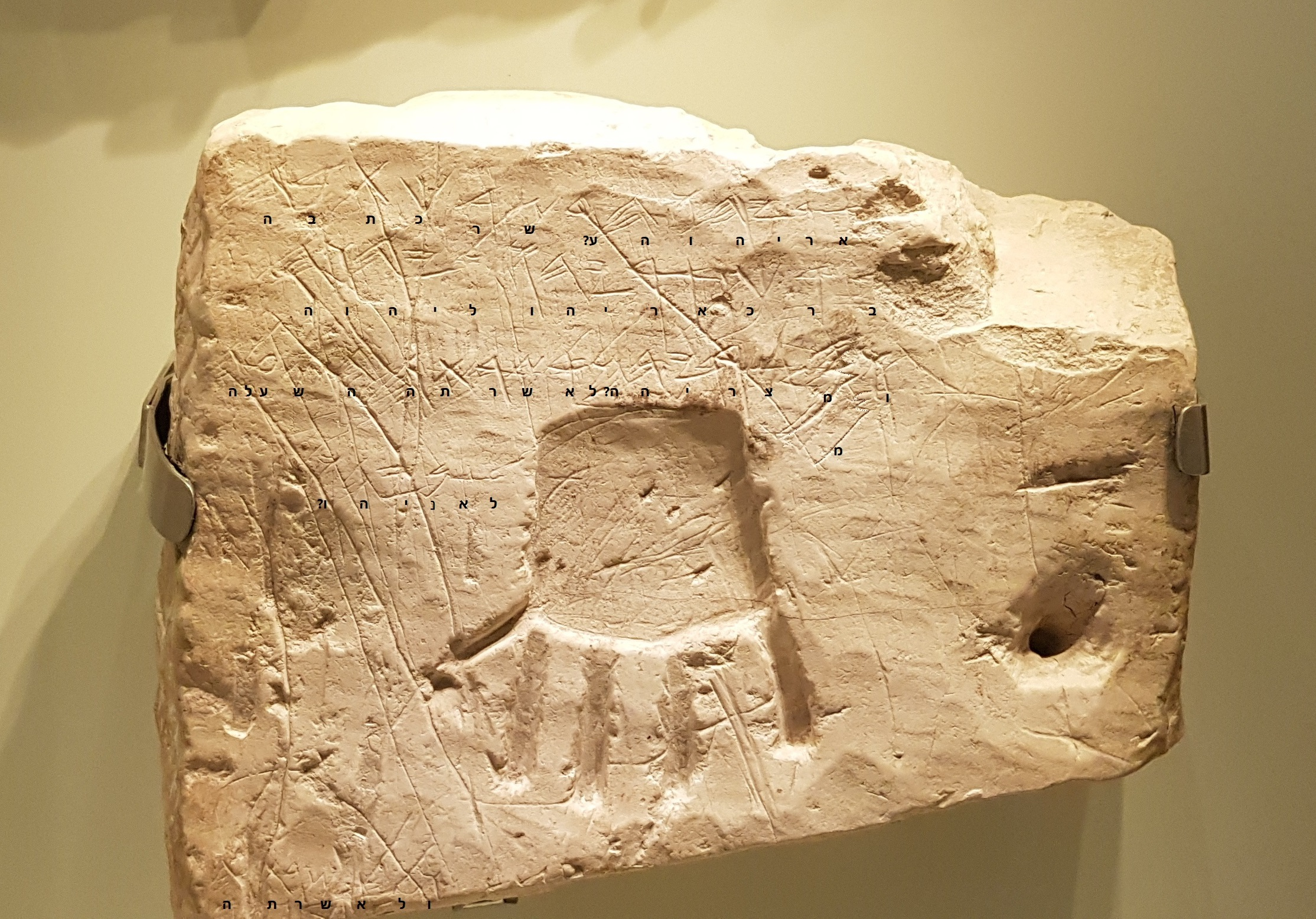
Hand motif carved in the shape of a hamsa at Khirbet el-Qom (ancient Kingdom of Judah), dating to the 8th century BCE.

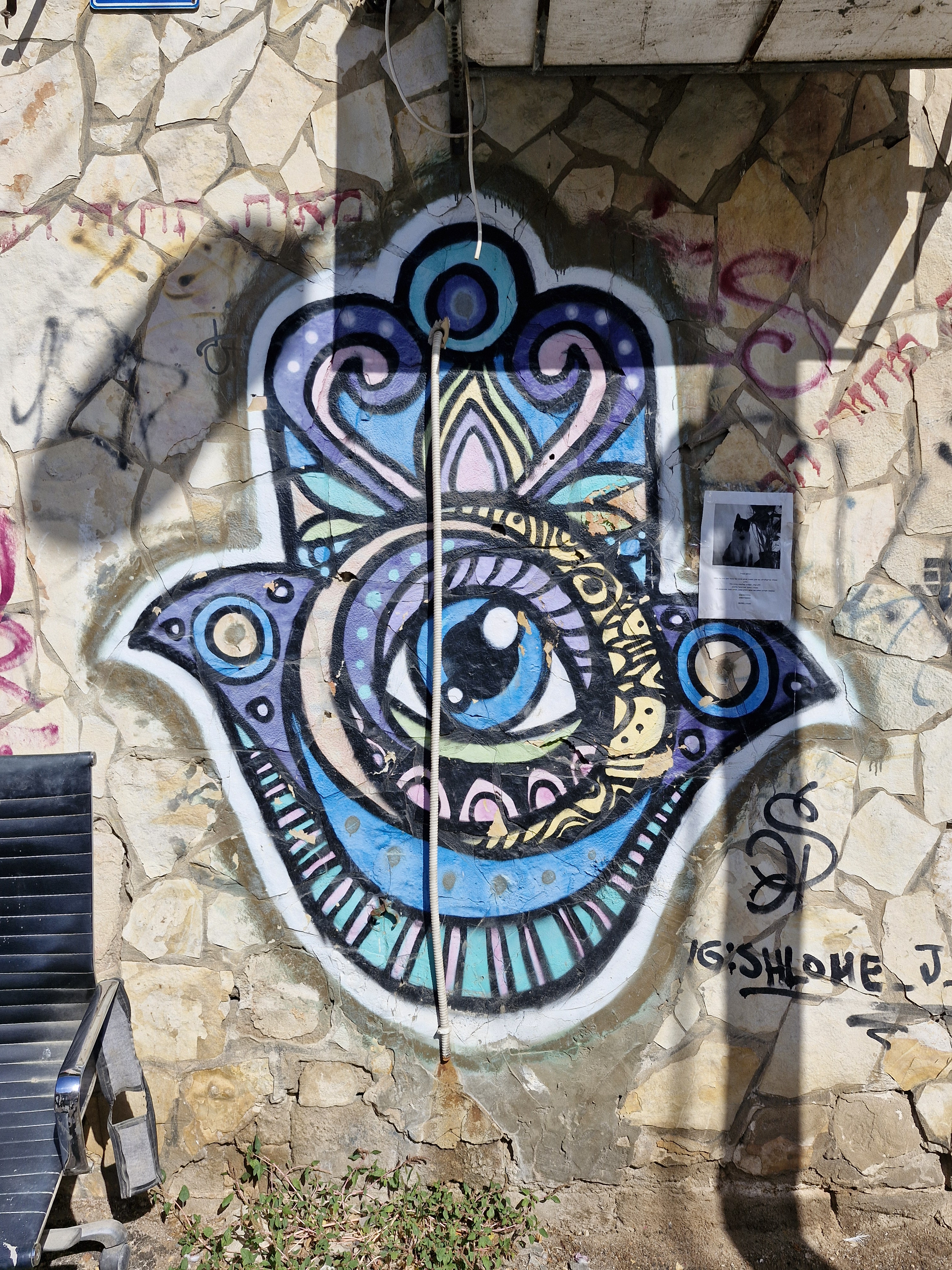
The Hamsa, or Hamesh, in Tel Aviv street art.

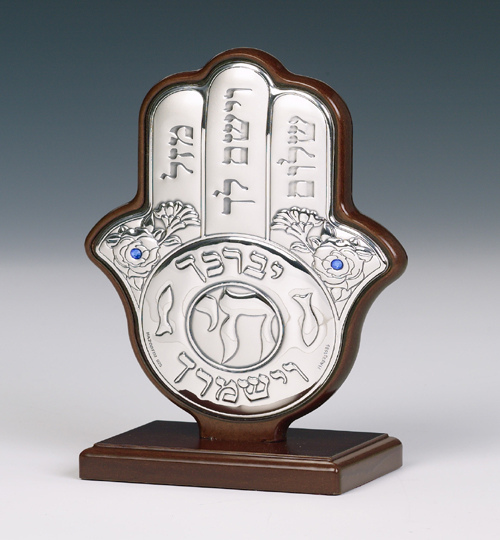
A hamsa embossed with the words of the Priestly Blessing in Hebrew

In relation to Judaism, one of the first appearances of the Hamsa was in Israelite tombs dating back to 800 BCE. It is speculated that Sephardic Jews were among the first to use this amulet due to their beliefs about the evil eye. The symbol of the hand appears in Kabbalistic manuscripts and amulets, doubling as the Hebrew letter "Shin", the first letter of "Shaddai", one of the names referring to God. The hamsa remained widely used among Sephardi communities and Jews from Islamic countries, but largely fell into disuse in Ashkenazi milieus by the mid-20th century. The notion of a protective hand has been present in Judaism dating back to Biblical times, where it is referenced in Deuteronomy 5:15, stated in the Ten Commandments as the "strong hand" of God who led the Hebrews out of Egypt. The hamsa is later seen in Jewish art as God's hand reaching down from heaven. Evidence has also emerged of the hamsa being used by Jews from medieval Spain, often associated with "sympathetic magic". Historians such as Shalom Sabar believe that after the Jewish expulsion from Spain in 1492, exiled Jews likely used the hamsa as protection in the foreign lands to which they relocated. However, this assumption remains difficult to prove. According to Sabar, the hamsa has also been used later by Jews in Europe "as a distinctive sign of the priesthood, especially when they wished to show that a person was of priestly descent..."

Jewish people have also adopted the symbol of the hand, often interpreted in relation to the Biblical passage that says that "the Lord took the Israelites out of Egypt with a strong hand and an outstretched arm". The "strong hand" is representative of the hamsa, which rooted its relevance in the community. The helping hand exemplified God's willingness to help his people and guide them out of struggle. Around the time of the Byzantine period, artists depicted God's hand reaching from above. God's hand from heaven would lead the Jewish people out of struggle, and the Jews subsequently made a connection with the hamsa and their culture. The hand was identified in Jewish texts and became an influential icon throughout the community. Among Jewish people, the hamsa is a highly respected, holy, and common symbol. It has sometimes been used to decorate the Ketubah (marriage contracts) and items used to dress the Torah, such as pointers and the Passover Haggadah. The presence of the hand image both inside and outside of synagogues suggests the importance and reverence the Jewish community associated with the hamsa. The hand decorated many of the most religious and sacred objects and later emerged from a phase of lesser use.

=== In Christianity ===
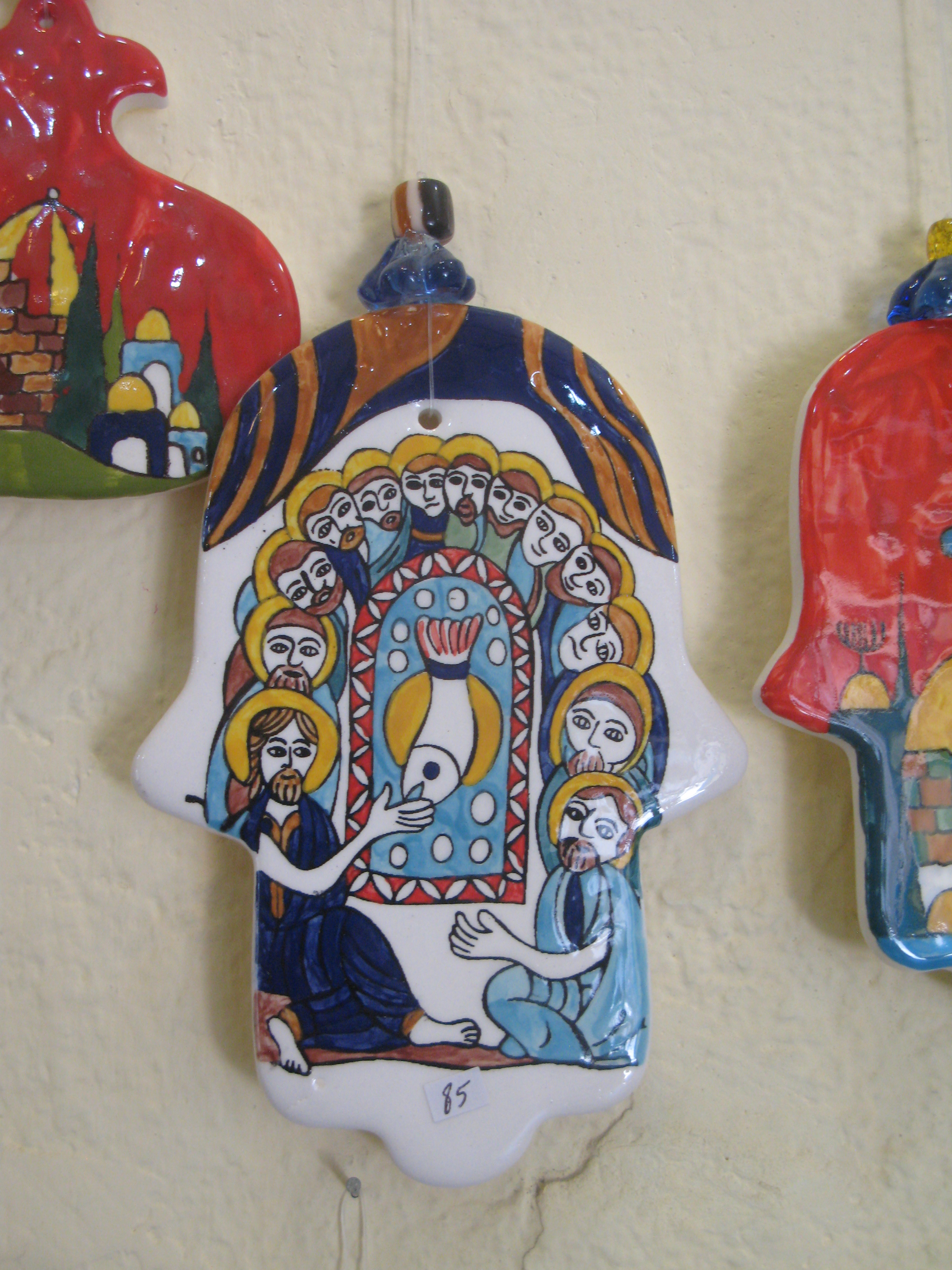
A ceramic hamsa depicting Jesus and his disciples

The khamsa holds recognition as a bearer of good fortune among Christians in the region as well. Levantine Christians call it the hand of Mary (Arabic: Kef Miryam, or the "Virgin Mary's Hand"). Thirty-four years after the end of Islamic presence in Spain, its use was significant enough to prompt an episcopal committee convened by Emperor Charles V to decree a ban on the Hand of Fatima and all open right-hand amulets in 1526.

=== In Islam ===
Although pre-Islamic in origin and used across cultures, the hamsa was integrated into Islamic popular piety and is widely linked to Fatima al-Zahra as a protective emblem against harm and the evil eye. The designation "Hand of Fatima" appears to be comparatively late; the Arabic phrase "yad Fatima" is rare in pre-modern usage and the name seems to have been popularized in modern and colonial-period discourse.

In Shia Islam, the hamsa is interpreted through devotion to the Ahl al-Bayt. The five fingers are read as the panjtan or Ahl al-Kisa (Muhammad, Ali ibn Abi Talib, Fatimah bint Muhammad, Hasan ibn Ali, Husayn ibn Ali), and the hand is associated with seeking the intercession of Fatimah in particular. Invocations are written on or around hand-shaped objects, with the names of the panjtan placed on the fingers. The hand is identified variously as the hand of Fatimah, the hand of Ali ibn Abi Talib, or the hand of Abbas ibn Ali, whose hands were severed at the Battle of Karbala; the open palm became an emblem in Muharram processions and on ʿalams. In Twelver theology, which avoids anthropomorphism, the Imams may be described as the "hand of God". Hand-topped standards, stoles and amulets are widely used in Iran, Iraq and South Asia.

According to Eva-Maria von Kemnitz (citing Bruno Barbatti), the hamsa is regarded as the most important apotropaic sign in the Islamic world; Barbatti also argued that many modern depictions reflect an origin in sex symbolism. However, salafi authorities reject the khamsa as an amulet: a fatwa states it is impermissible to hang the "Khamsa" and another lists "hands of Fatima" among prohibited amulets.

== Symbolism and usage ==
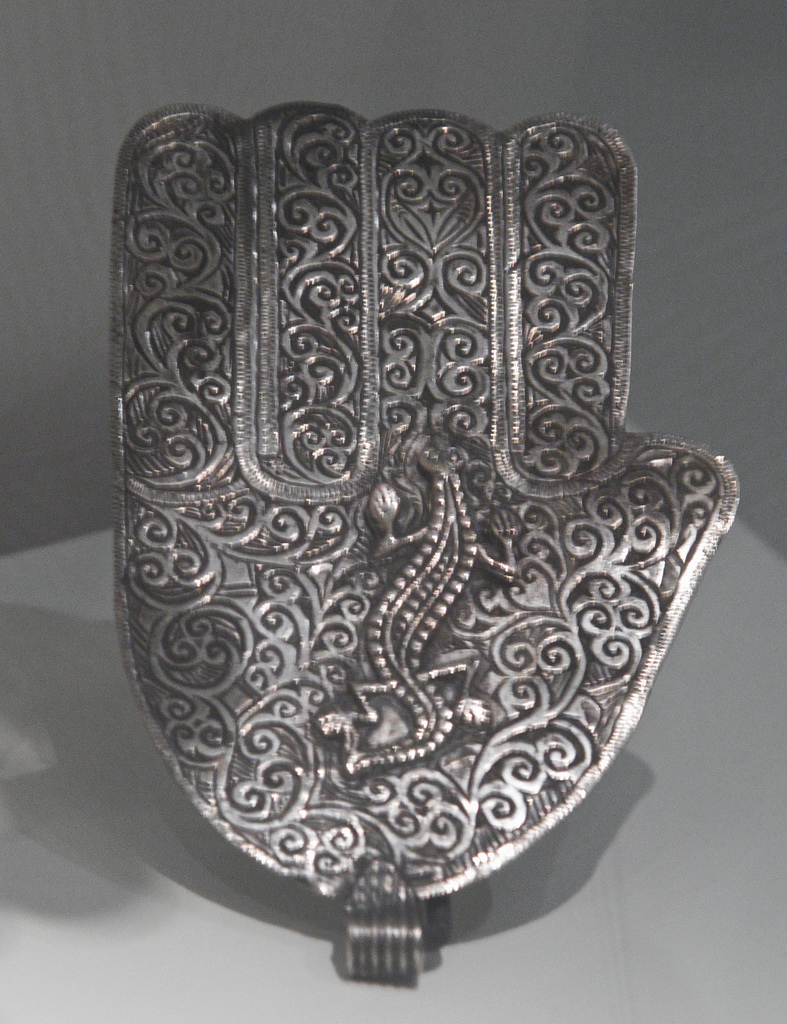
Silver hamsa amulet of Berber tradition (khmissa)

The hand, particularly the open right hand, is a sign of protection that also represents blessings, power, and strength, and is seen as potent in deflecting the evil eye. One of the most common components of gold and silver jewellery in the region of the Middle East, historically and traditionally, it was most commonly carved in jet or formed from silver, a metal believed to represent purity and to hold magical properties. It is also painted in red (sometimes using the blood of a sacrificed animal) on the walls of houses for protection, or painted or hung on the doorways of rooms, such as those of an expectant mother or new baby. The hand can be depicted with the fingers spread apart to ward off evil, or closed together to bring good luck. Similarly, it can be portrayed with the fingers pointing upward to ward off evil, or downward to bestow blessings. Highly stylised versions may be difficult to recognise as hands, and can consist of five circles representing the fingers, situated around a central circle representing the palm.

Used to protect against the evil eye, a malicious stare believed to cause illness, death, or general misfortune, hamsas often contain an eye symbol. Depictions of the hand, the eye, or the number five in Arabic (and Berber) tradition are related to warding off the evil eye, as exemplified in the saying khamsa fi ainek ("five [fingers] in your eye"). Raising one's right hand with the palm showing and the fingers slightly apart is part of this curse meant "to blind the aggressor". Another formula uttered against the evil eye in Arabic, but without hand gestures, is khamsa wa-khamis ("five and Thursday"). As the fifth day of the week, Thursday is considered a favourable day for magic rites and pilgrimages to the tombs of revered saints to counteract the effects of the evil eye.

Due to its significance in both Arabic and Berber culture, the hamsa is one of the national symbols of Algeria and appears in its emblem. It is also the most popular among different amulets (such as the Eye and the Hirz—a silver box containing verses of the Quran) for warding off the evil eye in Egypt. Egyptian women who live in baladi ("traditional") urban quarters often make khamaysa, which are amulets made up of five (khamsa) objects attached to their children's hair or black aprons. The five objects can be made of peppers, hands, circles, or stars hanging from hooks.

The hamsa's use declined in some areas during periods of modernisation. It later regained popularity as a secular "good luck" charm, and now appears on necklaces, keychains, postcards, lottery cards, and in advertisements, as well as jewellery, tilework, and wall decorations.

Similar to the Western phrase "knock on wood" or "touch wood", a common expression in the Middle East is "Khamsa, Khamsa, Khamsa, tfu, tfu, tfu," which mimics the sound of spitting to ward off bad luck.

The number five, associated with the hamsa, features in celebrations in the region, including festivals connected with fertility and prosperity. In countries including Morocco and Turkey, the hamsa is a common protective symbol used in jewellery, home decor, and art. Hamsa jewellery remains widespread among women in the region.

The symbol U+1FAAC 🪬 HAMSA was added to Unicode in 2021 (Unicode 14.0, Emoji 14.0).

== See also ==
- Abhayamudra
- Evil eye
- Filakto
- Hand of God (art)
- Nazar
- Skandola
- Mississippian Culture Hand and Eye Motif
- Tenome
