= Revadim Asherah =

Bronze Age Canaanite fertility goddess figurine

- Type: Figurine
- Symbols: Asherah, Great Mother, twins, vulva, ibices, crescent pendant, jewelry
- Created: 13th century BCE
- Discovered: 1986; Revadim, Israel
- Culture: Canaanite, Hebrew

The Revadim Asherah is an artifact from Revadim representing a genre of Asherah figurines. Like the inscriptions found at Khirbet el-Qom and Kuntillet Ajrud, these findings revealed Asherah's prominence in Canaanite and Hebrew religion.

== Depiction ==
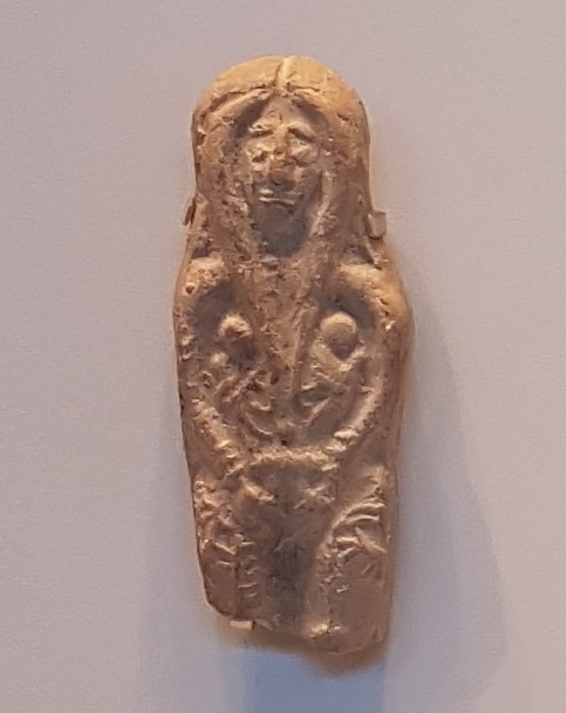
Photo

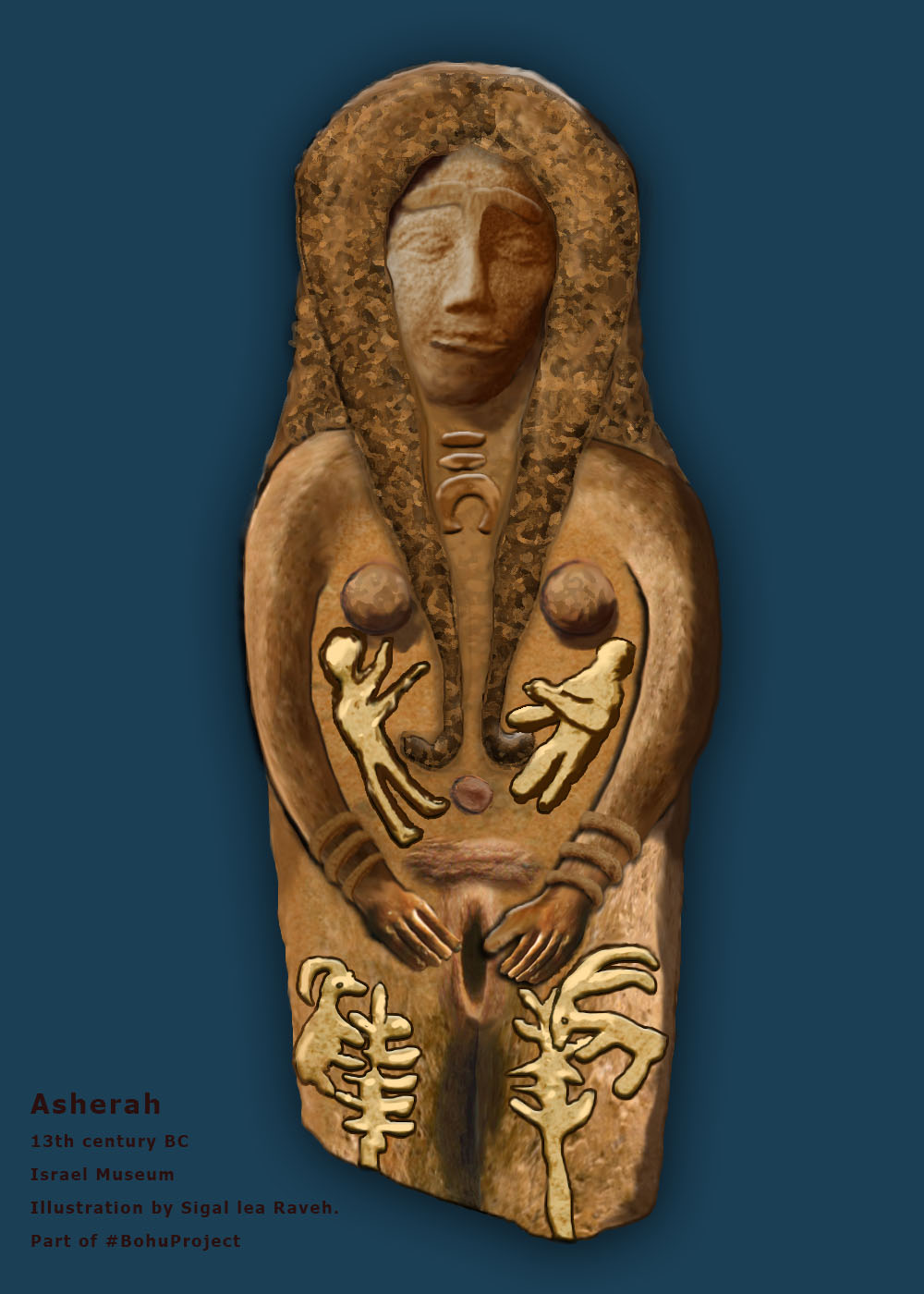
Illustration

The figure displays her vulva and she is breastfeeding twins. Miriam Tadmor emphasizes that the figure represents a deity, not a wetnurse. This distinction wouldn't have made sense to the people of Ugarit, who called her mšnqt .ilm 'wet nurse of the gods'. In Revadim, she has features such as long locks that are reminiscent of snakes directed towards the infants she cradles, jewelry adorning her wrists and neck, where hangs a large crescent pendant. Her hands open her vulva, and above is a ridge suggesting pubic hair. On each of her legs is a tall and sparse tree accompanied by an Ibex.

The crowded symbolism of the Revadim Asherah stands in contrast to related Judean pillar figurines. Whereas the pillar figures are plain, definitionally emphasizing their face and breasts without detail below, the Revadim prototype is maximalist, filling all possible space with sophisticated polysemy.

=== Specimens ===
Following publication in 1986, other examples were found at Tel Afek, Tel Harasim, Tel Burna, and Revadim in historic Judea. Differences are regional features, as they are dated as contemporaries from the latter 13th century BCE.

A Tel Burna goddess differed most in jewelry around the chest:

A horizontal line of three small pellets appears at the neck. Two braids depicting hair extend down the chest area, similar to the Egyptian Hathor style, are separated by an amorphous-shaped decoration just above the navel. There is a crescent or ring connected to a unique vertical band of eight rings extending down between these braids. This vertical row of rings running down the woman’s chest is unique. The crescent (or ring) shape near the woman’s neck is also distinctive.

The overall impression is of a long necklace of many small, chained elements.

== See also ==
- Judean pillar figure
- Khirbet el-Qom
- Deir Alla inscription
- Puġat
