= Haazinu =

53rd weekly Torah portion

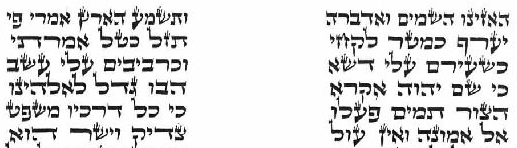
The beginning of Parashat Haazinu, Deuteronomy 32:1–4, as it appears in a Torah scroll

Haazinu, Ha'azinu, or Ha'Azinu (הַאֲזִינוּ—Hebrew for "listen" when directed to more than one person, the first word in the parashah) is the 53rd weekly Torah portion (פָּרָשָׁה, parashah) in the annual Jewish cycle of Torah reading and the 10th in the Book of Deuteronomy. It constitutes Deuteronomy 32:1–52. The parashah sets out the Song of Moses—an indictment of the Israelites' sins, a prophecy of their punishment, and a promise of God's ultimate redemption of them.

The parashah is made up of 2,326 Hebrew letters, 614 Hebrew words, 52 verses, and 92 lines in a Torah Scroll (סֵפֶר תּוֹרָה, Sefer Torah). Jews read it on a Shabbat between the holy days of Rosh Hashanah and Sukkot, generally in September or October. The bulk of the parashah, the song of Deuteronomy 32:1–43, appears in the Torah scroll in a distinctive two-column format, reflecting the poetic structure of the text, where in each line, an opening colon is matched by a second, parallel thought unit.

== Readings ==
In traditional Sabbath Torah reading, the parashah is divided into seven readings, or עליות, aliyot. In the Masoretic Text of the Tanakh (Hebrew Bible), Parashat Haazinu has two "open portion" (פתוחה, petuchah) divisions (roughly equivalent to paragraphs, often abbreviated with the Hebrew letter פ (peh)). The first open portion spans nearly the entire parashah, except for the concluding maftir (מפטיר) reading. The second open portion is coincident with the maftir (מפטיר) reading. Parashat Haazinu has no "closed portion" (סתומה, setumah) subdivisions (abbreviated with the Hebrew letter ס (samekh)).

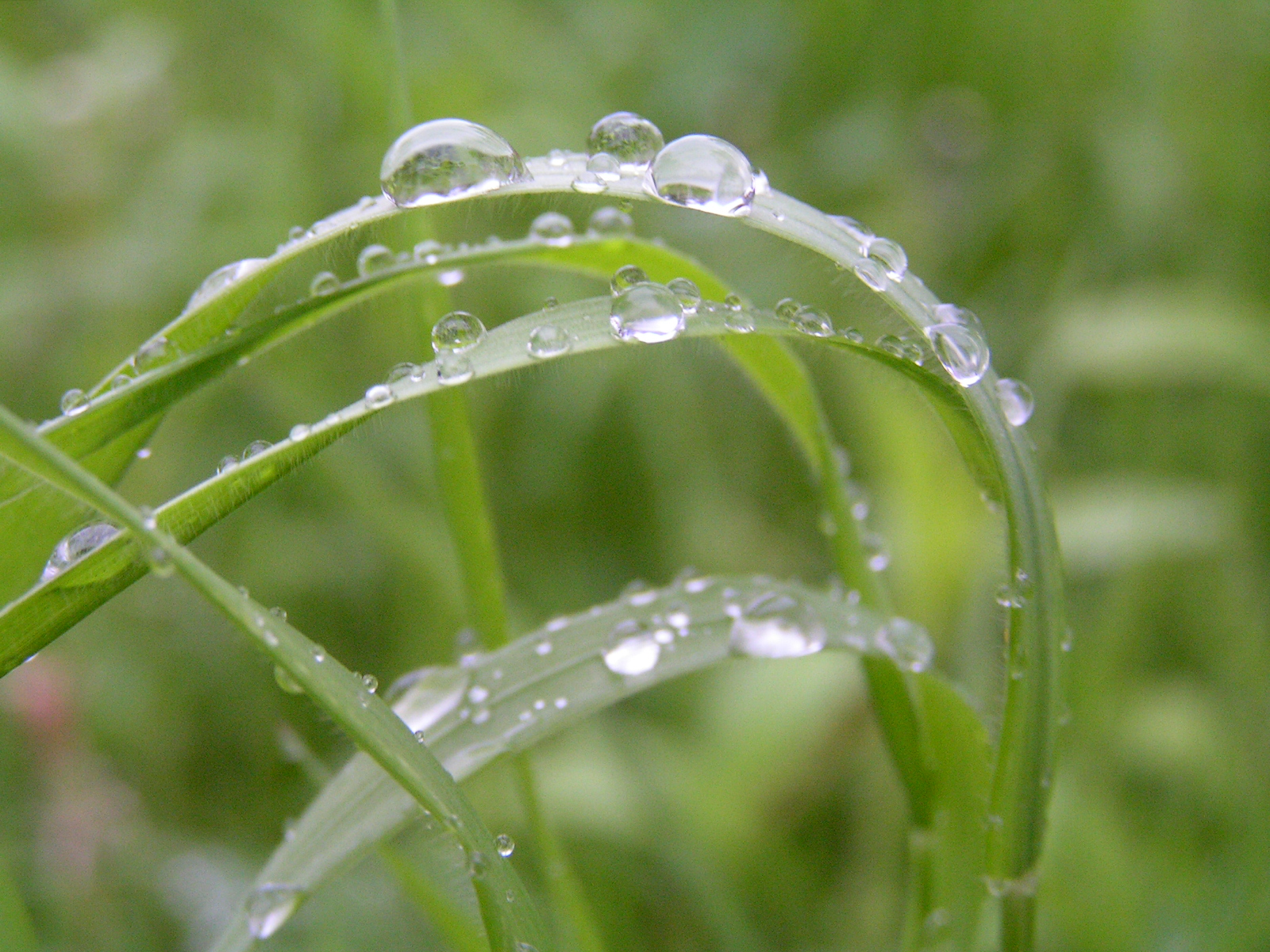
"My doctrine shall drop as the rain, my speech shall distil as the dew." (Deuteronomy 32:2.)

=== First reading—Deuteronomy 32:1–6 ===
In the first reading, Moses called on heaven and earth to hear his words, and asked that his speech be like rain and dew for the grass. Moses proclaimed that God was perfect in deed, just, faithful, true, and upright. God's children were unworthy, a crooked generation that played God false, ill requiting the Creator. The first reading ends here.

=== Second reading—Deuteronomy 32:7–12 ===
In the second reading, Moses exhorted the Israelites to remember that in ages past, God assigned the nations their homes and their due, but chose the Israelites as God's own people. God found the Israelites in the desert, watched over them, guarded them, like an eagle who rouses his nestlings, gliding down to his young, God spread God's wings and took Israel, bearing Israel along on God's pinions, God alone guided Israel. The second reading ends here.

=== Third reading—Deuteronomy 32:13–18 ===
In the third reading, God set the Israelites atop the highlands to feast on the yield of the earth and fed them honey, oil, curds, milk, lamb, wheat, and wine. So Israel grew fat and kicked and forsook God, incensed God with alien things, and sacrificed to demons and no-gods. The third reading ends here.

=== Fourth reading—Deuteronomy 32:19–28 ===
In the fourth reading, God saw, was vexed, and hid God's countenance from them, to see how they would fare. For they were a treacherous breed, children with no loyalty, who incensed God with no-gods, vexed God with their idols; thus God would incense them with a no-folk and vex them with a nation of fools. A fire flared in God's wrath and burned down to the base of the hills. God would sweep misfortunes on them, use God's arrows on them—famine, plague, pestilence, and fanged beasts—and with the sword would deal death and terror to young and old alike. God might have reduced them to nothing, made their memory cease among men, except for fear of the taunts of their enemies, who might misjudge and conclude that their own hand had prevailed and not God's. For Israel's enemies were a folk void of sense, lacking in discernment. The fourth reading ends here.

=== Fifth reading—Deuteronomy 32:29–39 ===
In the fifth reading, God wished that they were wise, then they would think about this, and gain insight into their future, for they would recognize that one could not have routed a thousand unless God had given them over. They were like Sodom and Gomorrah and their wine was the venom of asps. God stored it away to be the basis for God's vengeance and recompense when they should trip, for their day of disaster was near. God would vindicate God's people and take revenge for God's servants, when their might was gone. God would ask where the enemies' gods were—they who ate the fat of their offerings and drank their libation wine—let them rise up to help! There was no god beside God, who dealt death and gave life, wounded and healed. The fifth reading ends here.

=== Sixth reading—Deuteronomy 32:40–43 ===
In the sixth reading, God swore that when God would whet God's flashing blade, and lay hand on judgment, God would wreak vengeance on God's foes. God would make God's arrows drunk with blood, as God's sword devoured flesh, blood of the slain and the captive from the long-haired enemy chiefs. God would avenge the blood of God's servants, wreak vengeance on God's foes, and cleanse the land of God's people. The sixth reading ends here.

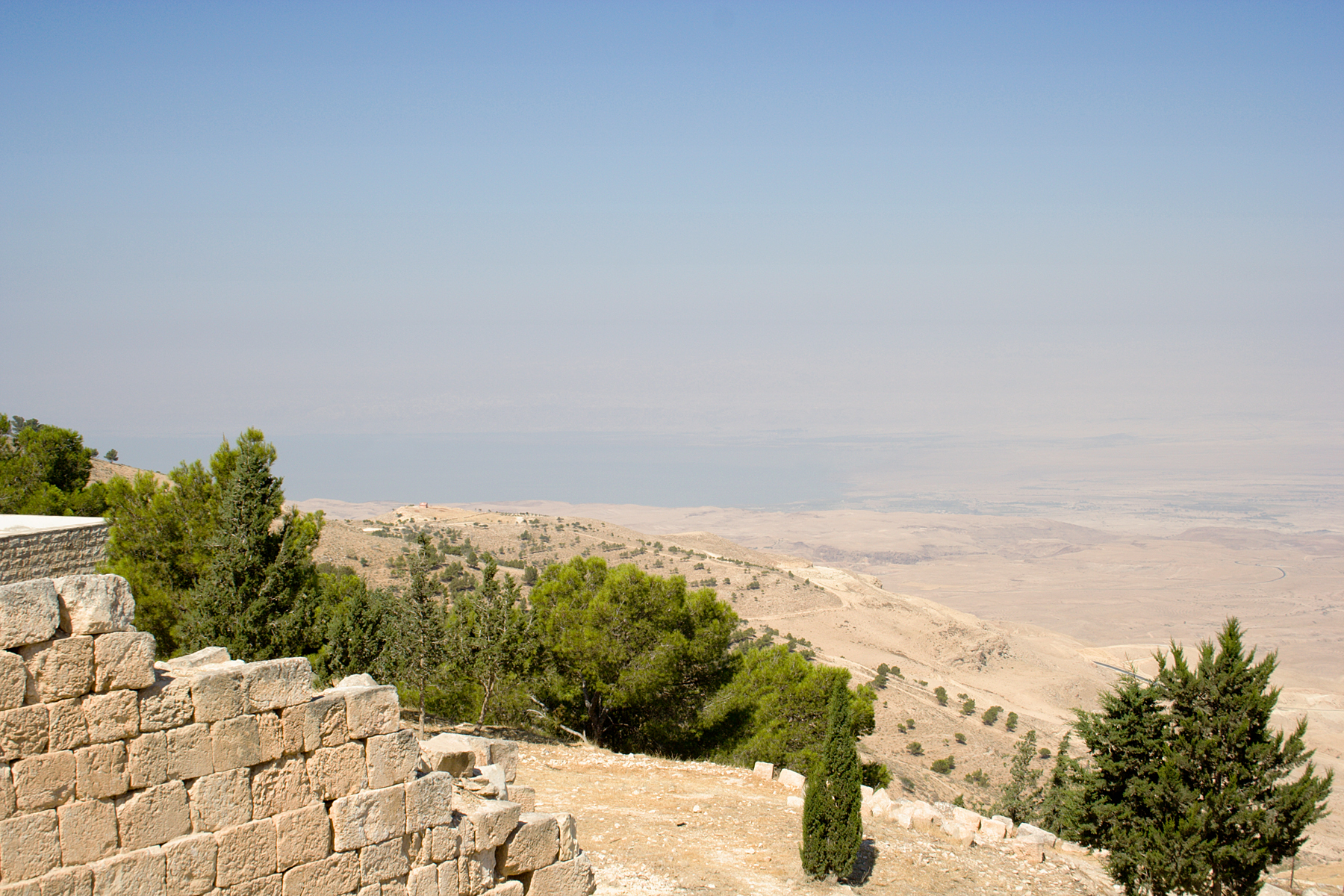
View of the Dead Sea from Mount Nebo

=== Seventh reading—Deuteronomy 32:44–52 ===
In the seventh reading, Moses came, together with Joshua, and recited all this poem to the people. And when Moses finished reciting, he told them to take his warnings to heart and enjoin them upon their children, for it was not a trifling thing but their very life at stake. The first open portion ends here.

In the maftir (מפטיר) reading of Deuteronomy 32:48–52 that concludes the parashah, God told Moses to ascend Mount Nebo and view the land of Canaan, for he was to die on the mountain, as his brother Aaron had died on Mount Hor, for they both broke faith with God when they struck the rock to produce water in the wilderness of Zin, failing to uphold God's sanctity among the Israelite people. The seventh reading, the second open portion, and the parashah end here.

=== Readings according to the triennial cycle ===
Jews who read the Torah according to the triennial cycle of Torah reading nonetheless read the entire parashah of Haazinu every year according to the schedule of readings above.

== In inner-Biblical interpretation ==
The parashah has parallels or is discussed in these Biblical sources:

Moses calls heaven and earth to serve as witnesses against Israel in Deuteronomy 4:26, 30:19, 31:28, and 32:1. Similarly, Psalm 50:4–5 reports that God "summoned the heavens above, and the earth, for the trial of His people," saying "Bring in My devotees, who made a covenant with Me over sacrifice!" Psalm 50:6 continues: "Then the heavens proclaimed His righteousness, for He is a God who judges." And in Isaiah 1:2, the prophet similarly begins his vision, "Hear, O heavens, and give ear, O earth: for the Lord has spoken."

In Deuteronomy 32:4, 15, 18, 30, and 31, Moses called God a "Rock." Isaiah did so, as well, in Isaiah 17:10, 26:4, and 30:29; Habakkuk in Habakkuk 1:12; and the Psalmist in Psalms 19:15, 23:3, 28:1, and 95:1. Psalm 18:3 analogizes God's role as a Rock to a "fortress" and a "high tower."

Deuteronomy compares God's relationship with Israel to that of a parent and child in Deuteronomy 1:31, 8:5, and 32:5. For similar comparisons, see Exodus 4:22–23, Isaiah 1:2, and Hosea 11:1.

In Deuteronomy 32:10, God finds Israel in the wilderness, much as in Hosea 9:10, God says, "I found Israel like grapes in the wilderness; I saw your fathers as the first-ripe in the fig tree at her first season."

Like Deuteronomy 32:11, God compares God’s self to an eagle in Exodus 19:4, saying "I bore you on eagles' wings, and brought you to myself." Psalm 91 interprets the role of God as an eagle in Deuteronomy 32:11. Psalm 91:4 explains, "He will cover you with His pinions, and under His wings shall you take refuge," and Psalm 91:5 explains, "You shall not be afraid of the terror by night, nor of the arrow that flies by day."

Deuteronomy 32:13 told how God "set him atop the highlands (עַל-במותי (בָּמֳתֵי), al-bamatei)." And in Amos 4:13, the 8th century BCE prophet Amos speaks of God "Who . . . treads upon the high places (עַל-בָּמֳתֵי, al-bamatei) of the earth."

== In classical rabbinic interpretation ==
The parashah is discussed in these rabbinic sources from the era of the Mishnah and the Talmud:

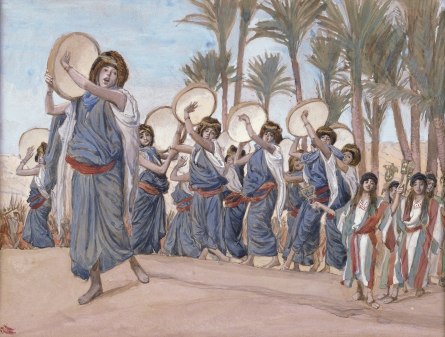
The Songs of Joy (watercolor circa 1896–1902 by James Tissot)

The Mekhilta of Rabbi Ishmael counted 10 songs in the Hebrew Bible: (1) the song that the Israelites recited at the first Passover in Egypt, as Isaiah 30:29 says, "You shall have a song as in the night when a feast is hallowed"; (2) the Song of the Sea in Exodus 15 (3) the song that the Israelites sang at the well in the wilderness, as Numbers 21:17 reports, "Then sang Israel this song: 'Spring up, O well'"; (4) the song that Moses spoke in his last days, as Deuteronomy 31:30 reports, "Moses spoke in the ears of all the assembly of Israel the words of this song"; (5) the song that Joshua recited, as Joshua 10:12 reports, "Then spoke Joshua to the Lord in the day when the Lord delivered up the Amorites"; (6) the song that Deborah and Barak sang, as Judges 5:1 reports, "Then sang Deborah and Barak the son of Abinoam"; (7) the song that David spoke, as 2 Samuel 22:1 reports, "David spoke to the Lord the words of this song in the day that the Lord delivered him out of the hand of all his enemies, and out of the hand of Saul"; (8) the song that Solomon recited, as Psalm 30:1 reports, "a song at the Dedication of the House of David"; (9) the song that Jehoshaphat recited, as 2 Chronicles 20:21 reports: "when he had taken counsel with the people, he appointed them that should sing to the Lord, and praise in the beauty of holiness, as they went out before the army, and say, 'Give thanks to the Lord, for His mercy endures forever'"; and (10) the song that will be sung in the time to come, as Isaiah 42:10 says, "Sing to the Lord a new song, and His praise from the end of the earth," and Psalm 149:1 says, "Sing to the Lord a new song, and His praise in the assembly of the saints."

The Gemara instructs that when writing a Torah scroll, a scribe needs to write the song of Deuteronomy 32:1–43 in a special two-column form, with extra spaces. (See the image at the top of this article.) If a scribe writes the song as plain text, then the scroll is invalid.

Rabbi Samuel ben Nahman asked why Moses called upon both the heavens and the earth in Deuteronomy 32:1. Rabbi Samuel compared Moses to a general who held office in two provinces and was about to hold a feast. He needed to invite people from both provinces, so that neither would feel offended for having been overlooked. Moses was born on earth, but became great in heaven.

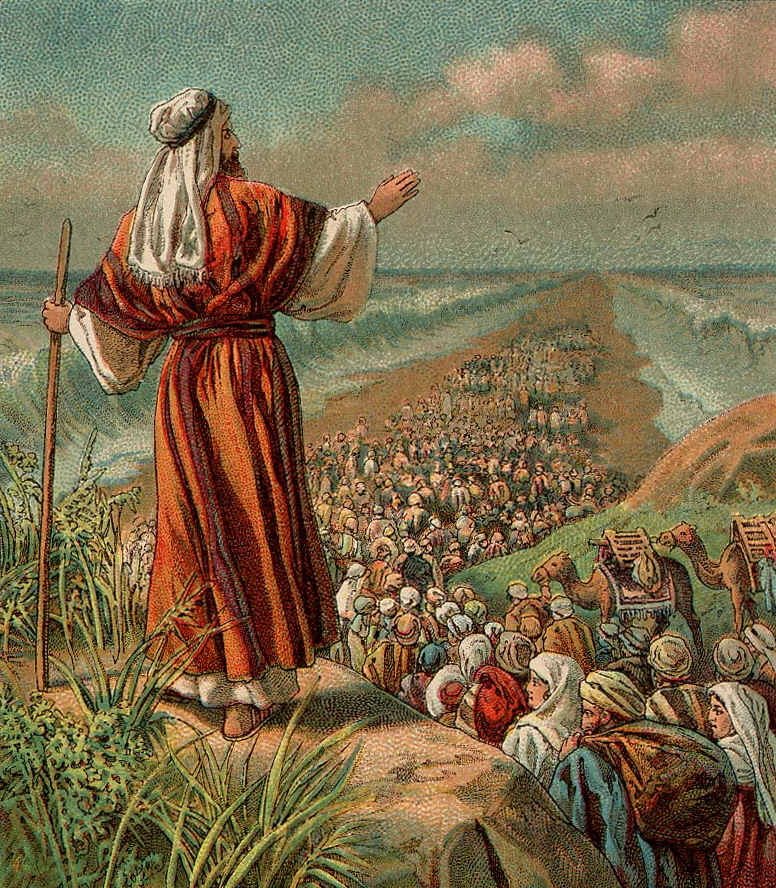
Israel's Escape from Egypt (illustration from a Bible card published 1907 by the Providence Lithograph Company)

Rabbi Jeremiah ben Eleazar taught that after Moses called upon the heavens to "give ear" in Deuteronomy 32:1, the heavens silenced according to God's decree. Rabbi Joḥanan taught that God made a stipulation with the sea that it should divide before the Israelites in Exodus 14:21; thus Exodus 14:27 says, "And the sea returned (לְאֵיתָנוֹ, le-etano)," that is, in accordance with its agreement (לתנאו, li-tenao). Rabbi Jeremiah ben Eleazar taught that God made such a stipulation with everything that was created in the six days of creation, as Isaiah 45:12 says, "I, even My hands, have stretched out the heavens, and all their host have I commanded." God thus commanded the sea to divide in Exodus 14:21, the heavens to be silent before Moses in Deuteronomy 32:1, the sun and the moon to stand still before Joshua in Joshua 10:12, the ravens to feed Elijah in 1 Kings 17:6, the fire to do no harm to Hananiah, Mishael, and Azariah in Daniel 3, the lions not to harm Daniel in Daniel 6, the heavens to open before Ezekiel in Ezekiel 1:1; and the fish to vomit forth Jonah in Jonah 2:11.

Similarly, a midrash taught that God said that if you incline your ear to the Torah, then when you begin speaking the Words of the Torah, all will remain silent before you and listen. The midrash taught that we learn this from Moses, for because he inclined his ear to the Torah, when he came to begin speaking the words of the Torah, both the heavenly and the earthly beings remained silent and listened. And the midrash taught that we know this from the words of Moses in Deuteronomy 32:1, "Give ear, you heavens, and I will speak."

The Sifre taught that Israel would come before God and acknowledge that heaven and earth, the witnesses that God designated in Deuteronomy 32:1, were present to testify against her, but God would say that God would remove them, as Isaiah 65:17 reports that God would "create a new heaven and a new earth." Israel would say to God that her bad name endured, but God would say that God would remove her bad name as well, as Isaiah 62:2 reports that Israel "shall be called by a new name." Israel would ask God whether God had not prohibited her reconciliation with God when Jeremiah 3:1 says, "If a man put away his wife, and she go from him, and become another man's, shall he return to her again?" But God would reply in the words of Hosea 11:9, "I am God, and not man." (And thus God would forgive Israel and restore her original relationship with God.)

In Deuteronomy 32:2, "My doctrine (לִקְחִי, likḥi) shall drop as the rain," Rav Judah read "doctrine" (לֶקַח, lekaḥ) to mean Torah, as Proverbs 4:2 states, "For I give you good doctrine (לֶקַח, lekaḥ); do not forsake My Torah." Rav Judah thus concluded that a day with rain is as great as the day on which God gave the Torah. Rava argued that rainfall is even greater than the day on which God gave the Torah, as Deuteronomy 32:2 says, "My doctrine shall drop as the rain," and when one makes a comparison, one compares a lesser thing to a greater thing. Thus, Rava argued, if Deuteronomy 32:2 compares Torah to rain, rain must be greater than Torah. Rava also inferred from the comparison in Deuteronomy 32:2 of Torah to both rain and dew that Torah can affect a worthy scholar as beneficially as dew, and an unworthy one like a crushing rainstorm.

Rabbi Berekhiah read Deuteronomy 32:2, "My doctrine shall drop (יַעֲרֹף, ya'arof) as the rain," to teach that if we bow our necks (עוֹרֶף, oref) in repentance, then the rain (for which we pray when it is absent) will fall immediately.

Rav Judah also read Deuteronomy 32:2 to compare Torah to the four winds. Rav Judah read "My doctrine shall drop (יַעֲרֹף, ya'arof) as the rain" to refer to the west wind, which comes from the back of (מֵעׇרְפּוֹ, me'orpo) the world, as the west was also referred to as the back. Rav Judah read "My speech shall distill (תִּזַּל, tizzal) as the dew" to refer to the north wind, which brings dry air that reduces the rain and grain and thereby devalues (מַּזֶּלֶת, mazzelet) gold (for when grain becomes scarce, its price rises, and the relative value of gold declines). Rav Judah read "As the small rain (כִּשְׂעִירִם, kisirim) upon the tender growth" to refer to the east wind that rages through (מַּסְעֶרֶת, maseret) the entire world like a demon (שָׂעִיר, sa'ir) when it blows strongly. And Rav Judah read "And as the showers upon the herb" to refer to the south wind, which raises showers and causes herbs to grow.

The Sifre read Deuteronomy 32:2, "like showers on young growths," to teach that just as showers fall on grass and make it grow and develop, so words of Torah make people grow and develop.

Rabbi Abbahu cited Deuteronomy 32:3 to support the proposition of Mishnah Berakhot 7:1 that three who have eaten together publicly should say the Grace after Meals (ברכת המזון, Birkat Hamazon) together as well. In Deuteronomy 32:3, Moses says, "When I (who am one) proclaim the name of the Lord, you (in the plural, who are thus at least two more) ascribe greatness to our God." Thus by using the plural to for "you," Moses implies that at least three are present, and they should ascribe greatness to God. Similarly, the Gemara taught that from Deuteronomy 32:3, "When I proclaim the name of the Lord, ascribe greatness to our God," one may derive the commandment to recite a blessing over the Torah before it is read, reading Deuteronomy 32:3 to teach that before one proclaims God's name by reading the Torah, one should give glory to God.

In the Sifre, Rabbi Jose found support in the words "ascribe greatness to our God" in Deuteronomy 32:3 for the proposition that when standing in the house of assembly saying, "Blessed is the Lord who is to be blessed," people are to respond, "Blessed is the Lord who is to be blessed forever and ever." Rabbi Jose also found support in those words for the proposition that Grace after Meals is said only when three are present; that one must say "Amen" after the one who says the blessing; that one must say, "Blessed is the Name of the Glory of His Kingdom forever and ever"; and that when people say, "May His great name be blessed," one must answer, "Forever and ever and ever." Similarly, the Talmud reports that a baraita taught that Rabbi Judah the Prince read Deuteronomy 32:3, "When I proclaim the name of the Lord, ascribe greatness to our God," to teach that Moses told the Jewish people: "When I mention the name of God, you give God glory and recite praises in God’s honor."

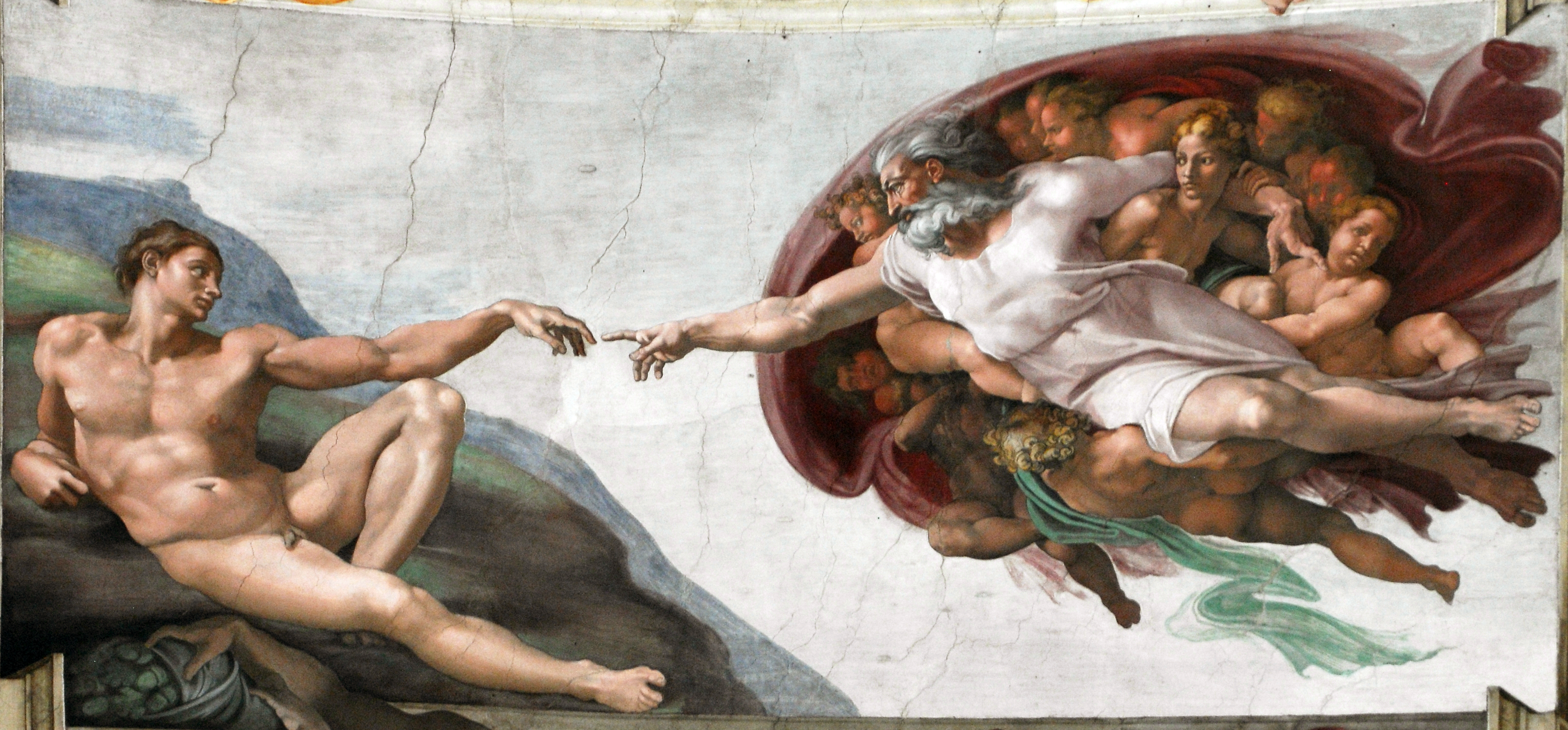
The Creation of Adam (fresco circa 1509 by Michelangelo in the Sistine Chapel)

Reading words of Deuteronomy 32:4, "The rock (הַצּוּר, ha-tzur), perfect is His work," the Sifre noted that the word "The rock" (הַצּוּר, ha-tzur) is similar to the word for "the artist" (הצייר, ha-tzayar), for God designed the world and formed humanity in it, as Genesis 2:7 says, "the Lord God formed the man." And the Sifre read the words of Deuteronomy 32:4, "a faithful God," to teach that God believed in the world and created it.

Citing the words of Deuteronomy 32:4, "The Rock, His work is perfect; for all His ways are judgment," Rabbi Ḥanina taught that those who say that God is lax in the execution of justice shall have their lives disregarded.

The Gemara tells that when Rabbi Ḥanina ben Teradion, his wife, and his daughter left a Roman tribunal that sentenced him and his wife to death for studying the Torah, they declared their submission to God's judgment by quoting Deuteronomy 32:4. Rabbi Ḥanina ben Teradion quoted Deuteronomy 32:4 to say, "The Rock, His work is perfect; for all his ways are justice." His wife continued quoting Deuteronomy 32:4 to say, "A God of faithfulness and without iniquity, just and right is He." And his daughter quoted Jeremiah 32:19: "Great in counsel and mighty in work, whose eyes are open upon all the ways of the sons of men, to give everyone according to his ways, and according to the fruit of his doing." Judah the Prince remarked on how great these righteous ones were, for three Scriptural passages expressing submission to Divine justice readily occurred to them just in time for their declaration of faith.

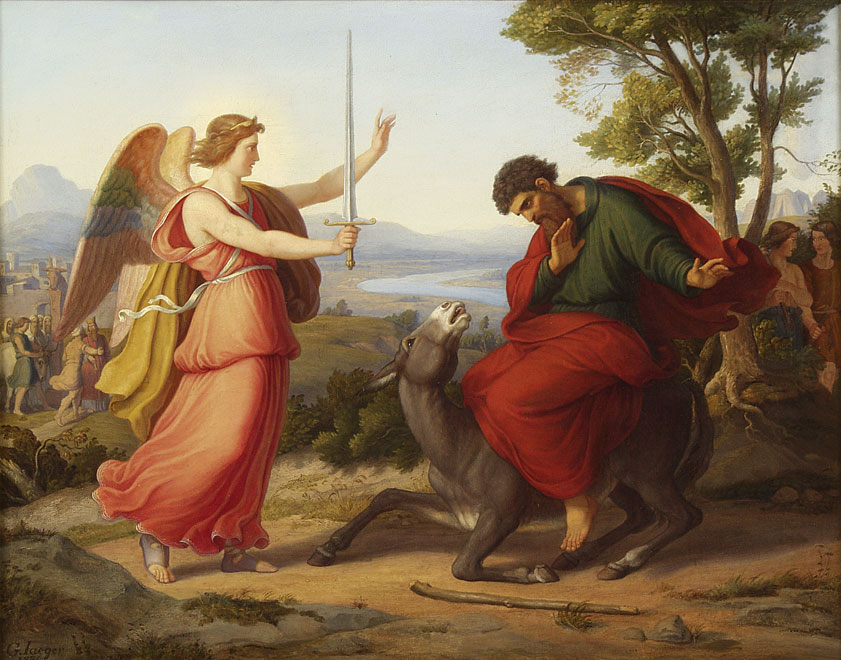
Balaam and the Angel (1836 painting by Gustav Jäger)

A midrash on Deuteronomy 32:4 elucidates the non-Jewish prophet Balaam. The midrash explains that the Torah records Balaam's story to make known that because the nonbeliever prophet Balaam did what he did, God removed prophecy and his presence from nonbelievers. The midrash taught that God originally wished to deprive nonbelievers of the opportunity to argue that God had estranged them. So in an application of the principle of Deuteronomy 32:4, "The Rock, His work is perfect; for all His ways are Justice," God raised up kings, sages, and prophets for both Israel and nonbelievers alike. Just as God raised up Moses for Israel, God raised up Balaam for the nonbelievers. But whereas the prophets of Israel cautioned Israel against transgressions, as in Ezekiel 3:17, Balaam sought to breach the moral order by encouraging the sin of Baal-Peor in Numbers 25:1–13. And while the prophets of Israel retained compassion towards both Israel and nonbelievers alike, as reflected in Jeremiah 48:36 and Ezekiel 27:2, Balaam sought to uproot the whole nation of Israel for no crime. Thus God removed prophecy from nonbelievers.

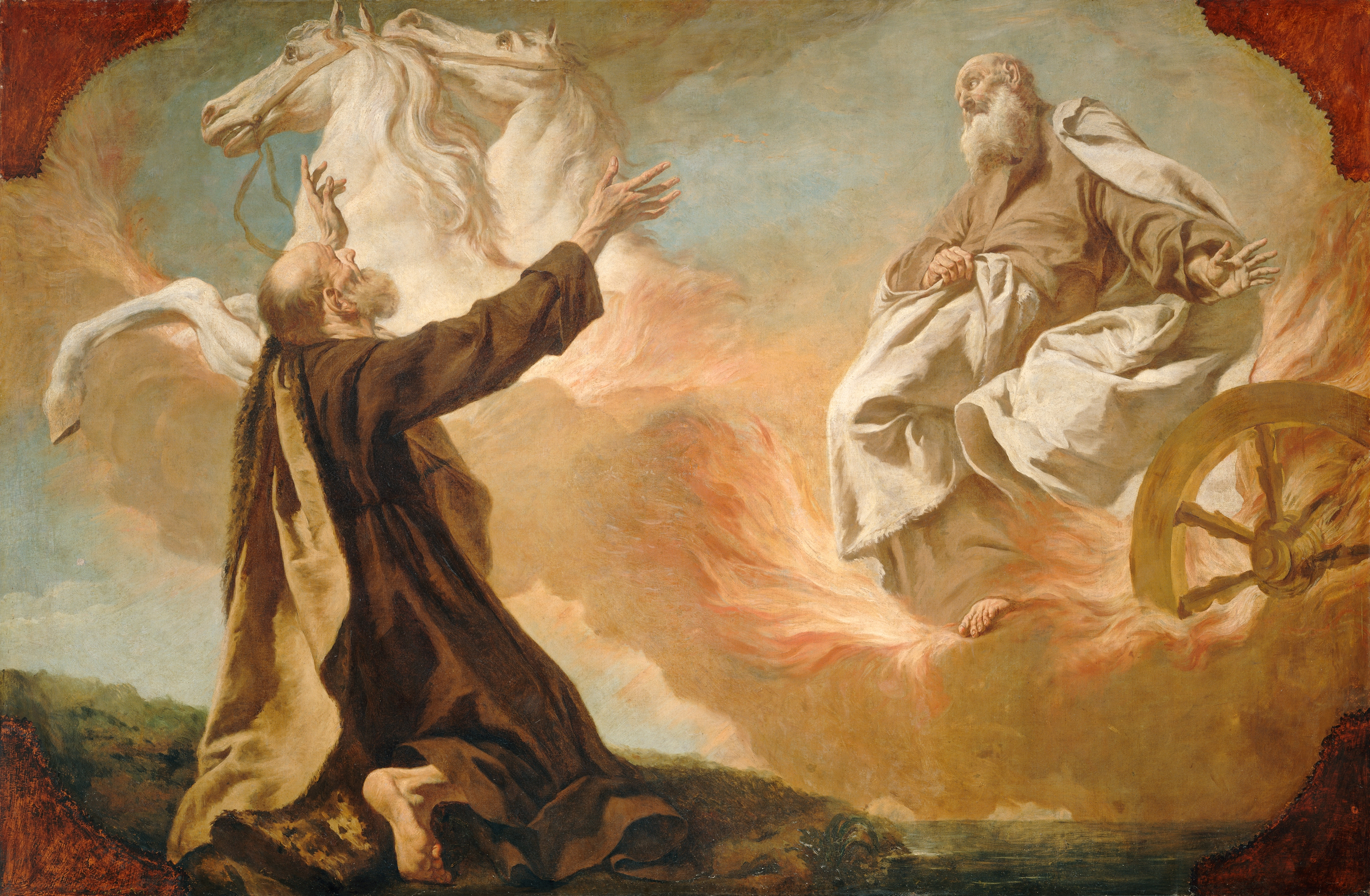
Elijah Taken Up in a Chariot of Fire (painting circa 1740 by Giuseppe Angeli)

Rabbi Ḥanina bar Papa taught that to enjoy this world without reciting a blessing is tantamount to robbing God, as Proverbs 28:24 says, "Whoever robs his father or his mother and says, 'It is no transgression,' is the companion of a destroyer," and Deuteronomy 32:6 says of God, "Is not He your father Who has gotten you?"

The Sifre read the words of Deuteronomy 32:7, "Ask your father and he will tell you," to refer to the prophets, as 2 Kings 2:12 says, "And Elisha saw [Elijah the prophet] and cried 'My father! My father!'"

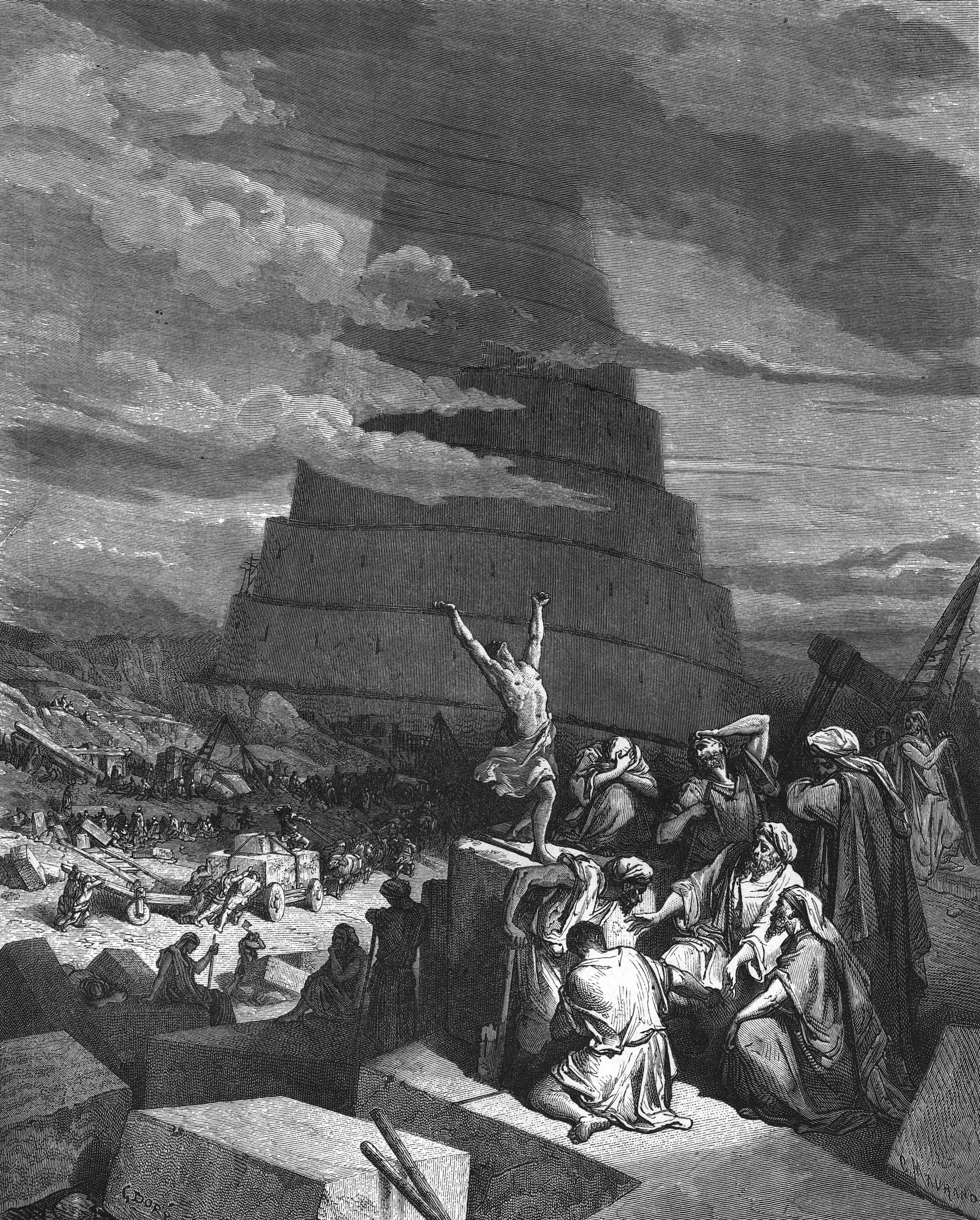
The Confusion of Tongues (engraving by Gustave Doré from the 1865 La Sainte Bible)

Rabbi Simeon taught that Deuteronomy 32:8, "When the Most High gave to the nations their inheritance," describes events that took place when God confused the languages of humankind at the Tower of Babel. Rabbi Simeon told that God called to the 70 angels who surround the throne of God's glory and said, "Let us descend and let us confuse the 70 nations (that made up the world) and the 70 languages." Rabbi Simeon deduced this from Genesis 11:7, where God said, "Let us go down," not "I will go down." Rabbi Simeon taught that Deuteronomy 32:8 reports that they cast lots among them. God's lot fell upon Abraham and his descendants, as Deuteronomy 32:9 reports, "For the Lord's portion is his people; Jacob is the lot of his inheritance." God said that God's soul lives by the portion and lot that fell to God, as Psalm 16:6 says, "The lots have fallen to me in pleasures; yea, I have a goodly heritage." God then descended with the 70 angels who surround the throne of God's glory and they confused the speech of humankind into 70 nations and 70 languages.

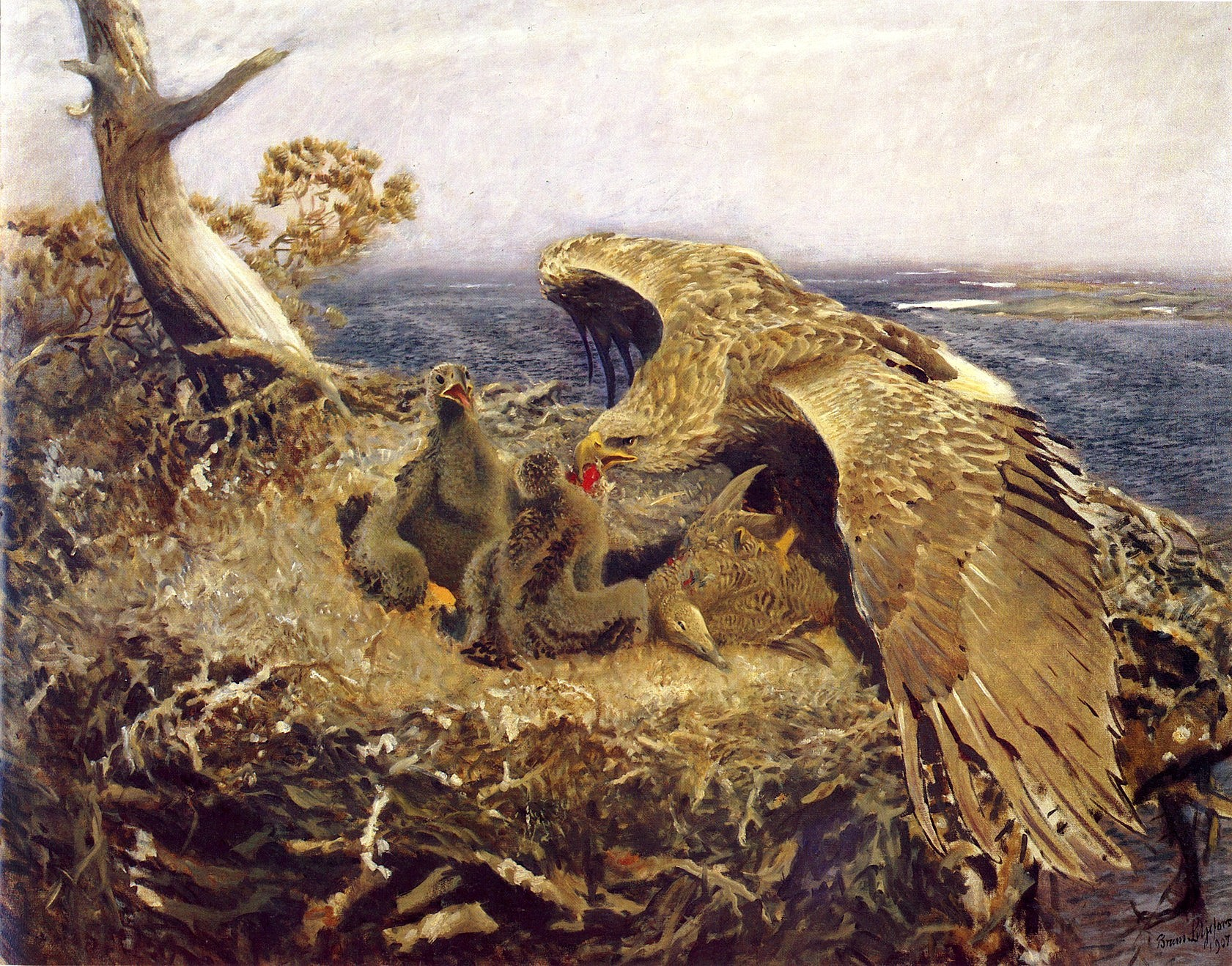
Sea Eagle's Nest (1907 painting by Bruno Liljefors)

The Sifre expanded on the metaphor of God as an eagle in Deuteronomy 32:11, teaching that just as an eagle enters her nest only after shaking her chicks with her wings, fluttering from tree to tree to wake them up, so that they will have the strength to receive her, so when God revealed God's self to give the Torah to Israel, God did not appear from just a single direction, but from all four directions, as Deuteronomy 33:2 says, "The Lord came from Sinai, and rose from Seir to them," and Habakkuk 3:3 says, "God comes from the south."

The Gemara read the word "Rock" in Deuteronomy 32:18 to refer to God, and the Gemara employed that interpretation with others to support Abba Benjamin's assertion that when two people enter a synagogue to pray, and one of them finishes first and leaves without waiting for the other, God disregards the prayer of the one who left.

Rabbi Judah ben Simon expounded on God's words in Deuteronomy 32:20, "I will hide My face from them." Rabbi Judah ben Simon compared Israel to a king's son who went into the marketplace and struck people but was not struck in return (because of his being the king's son). He insulted but was not insulted. He went up to his father arrogantly. But the father asked the son whether he thought that he was respected on his own account, when the son was respected only on account of the respect that was due to the father. So the father renounced the son, and as a result, no one took any notice of him. So when Israel went out of Egypt, the fear of them fell upon all the nations, as Exodus 15:14–16 reported, "The peoples have heard, they tremble; pangs have taken hold on the inhabitants of Philistia. Then were the chiefs of Edom frightened; the mighty men of Moab, trembling takes hold upon them; all the inhabitants of Canaan are melted away. Terror and dread falls upon them." But when Israel transgressed and sinned, God asked Israel whether it thought that it was respected on its own account, when it was respected only on account of the respect that was due to God. So God turned away from them a little, and the Amalekites came and attacked Israel, as Exodus 17:8 reports, "Then Amalek came, and fought with Israel in Rephidim," and then the Canaanites came and fought with Israel, as Numbers 21:1 reports, "And the Canaanite, the king of Arad, who dwelt in the South, heard tell that Israel came by the way of Atharim; and he fought against Israel." God told the Israelites that they had no genuine faith, as Deuteronomy 32:20 says, "they are a very disobedient generation, children in whom is no faith." God concluded that the Israelites were rebellious, but to destroy them was impossible, to take them back to Egypt was impossible, and God could not change them for another people. So God concluded to chastise and try them with suffering.

Rabbi Jacob taught in Rabbi Aha's name (or others say in the Rabbi Abin's name) that no hour is as grievous as that in which God hides God's face (as foretold in Deuteronomy 31:17–18 and 32:20). Rabbi Jacob taught that since that hour, he had hoped for God, for God said in Deuteronomy 31:21, "For it shall not be forgotten out of the mouths of their seed."

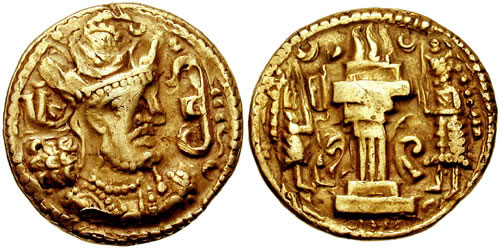
Coin of Shapur II, Sasanian king 309–379

Rav Bardela bar Tabyumi taught in Rav's name that to whomever "hiding of the face" does not apply is not one of the Children of Israel, and to whomever "they shall be devoured" does not apply is also not one of them. The Rabbis confronted Rava, saying "hiding of the face" and "they shall be devoured" did not apply to Rava. Rava asked the Rabbis whether they knew how much he was forced to send secretly to the Court of King Shapur of Persia. Even so, the Rabbis directed their eyes upon Rava in suspicion. Meanwhile, the Court of King Shapur sent men who seized Rava's property. Rava then said that this bore out what Rabban Simeon ben Gamliel taught, that wherever the Rabbis direct their eyes in suspicion, either death or poverty follows. Interpreting "I will hide My face," Rava taught that God said although God would hide God's face from them, God would nonetheless speak to them in a dream. Rav Joseph taught that God's hand is nonetheless stretched over us to protect us, as Isaiah 51:16 says, "And I have covered you in the shadow of My hand." Rabbi Joshua ben Hanania was once at the Roman emperor Hadrian's court, when an unbeliever gestured to Rabbi Joshua in sign language that the Jewish people was a people from whom their God had turned His face. Rabbi Joshua ben Hanania gestured in reply that God's hand was stretched over the Jewish people. Emperor Hadrian asked Rabbi Joshua what unbeliever had said. Rabbi Joshua told the emperor what unbeliever had said and what Rabbi Joshua had replied. They then asked the unbeliever what he had said, and he told them. And then they asked what Rabbi Joshua had replied, and the unbeliever did not know. They decreed that a man who does not understand what he is being shown by gesture should hold converse in signs before the emperor, and they led him forth and executed him for his disrespect to the emperor.

A midrash taught that Deuteronomy 32:20, "For they are a very contrary (tahpukot) generation," applied to the spies. The midrash contrasted Numbers 13:2, "Send you men," with Proverbs 26:6, "He that sends a message by the hand of a fool cuts off his own feet, and drinks damage." The midrash asked whether the spies were men or fools. The midrash noted that Numbers 13:2 says, "Send you men," and wherever Scripture uses the word "men," Scripture implies righteous people, as in Exodus 17:9, "And Moses said to Joshua: 'Choose us out men'"; in 1 Samuel 17:12, "And the man was an old man (and thus wise) in the days of Saul, coming among men (who would naturally be like him)"; and in 1 Samuel 1:11, "But will give to Your handmaid seed who are men." If Numbers 13:2 thus implies that the spies were righteous people, could they still have been fools? The midrash explained that they were fools because they spread an evil report about the land, and Proverbs 10:18 says, "He that utters a slander is a fool." The midrash reconciled the two characterizations by telling that the spies were great men who then made fools of themselves. It was concerning them that Moses said in Deuteronomy 32:20, "They are a very contrary generation, children in whom is no faithfulness." For the midrash taught that the spies had been chosen out of all Israel by the command of both God and Moses; as Moses said in Deuteronomy 1:23, "And the thing pleased me well; and I took twelve men of you," implying that they were righteous in the opinion of both Israel and in Moses. Yet Moses did not want to send them on his own responsibility, so he consulted God about everyone, mentioning the name and tribe of each, and God told Moses that each was worthy. The midrash explained that one can infer that God told Moses that they were worthy, because Numbers 13:3 reports, "And Moses sent them from the wilderness of Paran according to the commandment of the Lord." Afterwards, at the end of 40 days, they changed and made all the trouble, causing that generation to be punished; thus Deuteronomy 32:20 says, "For they are a very contrary (tahpukot) generation," since when they were selected, they were righteous and then they changed (nitapeku). Accordingly, Numbers 13:2 says, "Send you men," and afterwards Numbers 13:16 says, "These are the names of the men."

Reading Deuteronomy 32:20, "children in whom is no faithfulness," Rabbi Meir noted that even when people are faithless, God still considers them God’s children.

The Gemara read the word רֶשֶׁף, reshef ("fiery bolt") in Deuteronomy 32:24 to refer to demons, and the Gemara employed that interpretation with others to support Rabbi Isaac's assertion that reciting the Shema in bed keeps demons away. Rabbi Shimon ben Lakish reasoned from Deuteronomy 32:24 that Torah study keeps away painful sufferings. For Job 5:7 says, "And the sons of רֶשֶׁף, reshef, fly upward (עוּף, uf)." He argued that the word עוּף, uf, refers only to the Torah, as Proverbs 23:5 says, "Will you close (הֲתָעִיף, hataif) your eyes to it (the Torah)? It is gone." And רֶשֶׁף, reshef, refers only to painful sufferings, as Deuteronomy 32:24 says, "The wasting of hunger, and the devouring of the fiery bolt (רֶשֶׁף, reshef). Rabbi Joḥanan said to Rabbi Shimon ben Lakish that even school children know that the Torah protects against painful disease. For Exodus 15:26 says, "And He said: 'If you will diligently hearken to the voice of the Lord your God, and will do that which is right in His eyes, and will give ear to His commandments, and keep all His statutes, I will put none of the diseases upon you that I have put upon the Egyptians; for I am the Lord Who heals you." Rather one should say that God visits those who can study the Torah and do not do so with ugly and painful sufferings which stir them up. For Psalm 39:3 says, "I was dumb with silence, I kept silence from the good thing, and my pain was stirred up." "The good thing" refers only to the Torah, as Proverbs 4:2 says, "For I give you good doctrine; forsake not My teaching."

Rava resolved a potential contradiction in Deuteronomy 32:39, where God says, "I put to death, and I make live," and then says, "I wound and I heal." One might wonder: If God revives the dead, then God can certainly heal those who are alive. Rather, Rava interpreted the second clause to clarify the first one: God will revive those whom God let die, and God will heal those whom God wounded.

Rav Hisda taught that one walking in a dirty alleyway should not recite the Shema, and one reciting the Shema who comes upon a dirty alleyway should stop reciting. Of one who would not stop reciting, Rav Adda bar Ahavah quoted Numbers 15:31 to say: "he has despised the word of the Lord." And of one who does stop reciting, Rabbi Abbahu taught that Deuteronomy 32:47 says: "through this word you shall prolong your days."

Rabbi Joḥanan counted ten instances in which Scripture refers to the death of Moses (including one in the parashah), teaching that God did not finally seal the harsh decree until God declared it to Moses. Rabbi Joḥanan cited these ten references to the death of Moses: (1) Deuteronomy 4:22: "But I must die in this land; I shall not cross the Jordan"; (2) Deuteronomy 31:14: "The Lord said to Moses: 'Behold, your days approach that you must die'"; (3) Deuteronomy 31:27: "[E]ven now, while I am still alive in your midst, you have been defiant toward the Lord; and how much more after my death"; (4) Deuteronomy 31:29: "For I know that after my death, you will act wickedly and turn away from the path that I enjoined upon you"; (5) Deuteronomy 32:50: "And die in the mount that you are about to ascend, and shall be gathered to your kin, as your brother Aaron died on Mount Hor and was gathered to his kin"; (6) Deuteronomy 33:1: "This is the blessing with which Moses, the man of God, bade the Israelites farewell before his death"; (7) Deuteronomy 34:5: "So Moses the servant of the Lord died there in the land of Moab, at the command of the Lord"; (8) Deuteronomy 34:7: "Moses was 120 years old when he died"; (9) Joshua 1:1: "Now it came to pass after the death of Moses"; and (10) Joshua 1:2: "Moses My servant is dead." Rabbi Joḥanan taught that ten times it was decreed that Moses should not enter the Land of Israel, but the harsh decree was not finally sealed until God revealed it to him and declared (as reported in Deuteronomy 3:27): "It is My decree that you should not pass over."

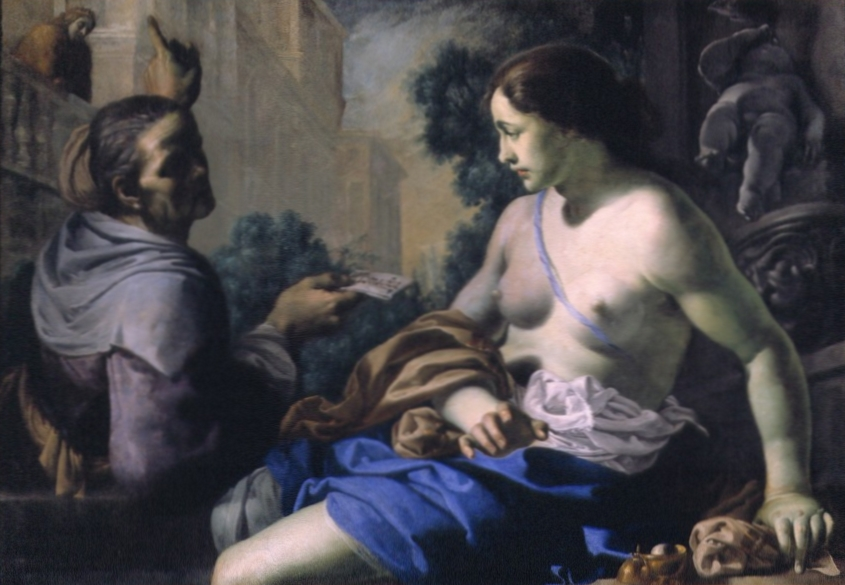
David and Bathsheba (mid-17th-century painting by Bernardino Mei)

The Sifre taught that God told Moses in Deuteronomy 32:50 that Moses would die "as Aaron your brother died on Mount Hor, and was gathered unto his people," because when Moses saw the merciful manner of Aaron's death, as reported in Numbers 20:23–28, Moses concluded that he would want to die the same way. The Sifre taught that God told Aaron to go in a cave, to climb onto a bier, to spread his hands, to spread his legs, to close his mouth, and to close his eyes, and then Aaron died. And at that moment, Moses concluded that one would be happy to die that way.

The Gemara implied that the sin of Moses in striking the rock at Meribah compared favorably to the sin of David. The Gemara reported that Moses and David were two good leaders of Israel. Moses begged God that his sin be recorded, as it is in Numbers 20:12, 20:23–24, and 27:13–14, and Deuteronomy 32:51. David, however, begged that his sin be blotted out, as Psalm 32:1 says, "Happy is he whose transgression is forgiven, whose sin is pardoned." The Gemara compared the cases of Moses and David to the cases of two women whom the court sentenced to be lashed. One had committed an indecent act, while the other had eaten unripe figs of the seventh year in violation of Leviticus 25:6. The woman who had eaten unripe figs begged the court to make known for what offense she was being flogged, lest people say that she was being punished for the same sin as the other woman. The court thus made known her sin, and the Torah repeatedly records the sin of Moses.

== In medieval Jewish interpretation ==
The parashah is discussed in these medieval Jewish sources:

Saadiah Gaon interpreted the phrase "heaven and earth" in Deuteronomy 32:1 to refer to the angels and the people of the earth.

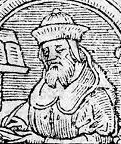
Rashi

Rashi explained that Moses called upon heaven and earth to serve as witnesses in Deuteronomy 32:1 in case Israel denied accepting the covenant, because Moses knew he was mortal and would soon die, while heaven and earth would endure forever. Furthermore, said Rashi, if Israel acted meritoriously, then the witnesses would be able to reward them, as the earth would yield its produce and the heavens would give their dew. Zechariah 8:12.) And if Israel acted sinfully, then the hand of the witnesses would be the first to inflict punishment (carrying out the injunction of Deuteronomy 17:7), as God would close off heaven's rain, and the soil would not yield its produce.

Rashi interpreted Deuteronomy 32:2 to refer to Torah, which, like rain, provides life to the world. Rashi interpreted the request of Moses in Deuteronomy 32:2 for his speech to rain down "as the dew," "as the rain," to mean that it should come in small droplets. Rashi interpreted that Moses wanted to teach the children of Israel slowly, the knowledge "raining" down on the people in small portions, for if they were to be subject to all knowledge coming down at once, they would be overwhelmed and thus wiped out.

Reading the description of God by Moses in Deuteronomy 32:4, "The Rock, His work is perfect, for all His ways are justice," Baḥya ibn Paquda argued we can see that God possesses these attributes from the evidence of God's deeds towards God's creations and from the wisdom and power that God's deeds reflect. But Baḥya cautioned that one must be careful not to take descriptions of God's attributes literally or in a physical sense. Rather, one must know that they are metaphors, geared to what we are capable of grasping with our powers of understanding, because of our urgent need to know God. But God is infinitely greater and loftier than all of these attributes.

Baḥya also read the words of Deuteronomy 32:4 to provide comfort when one questions why some righteous people do not receive their livelihood except after hard and strenuous toil, while many transgressors are at ease, living a good, pleasant life. For each specific case has its own particular reason, known only to God.

Baḥya ibn Paquda cited Deuteronomy 32:6 to teach that, even though students must first learn Tradition, they should not rely solely on Tradition if they can attain comprehension through reason. He therefore deduced that all who are capable are obligated to investigate with their intellect and to bring logical proofs of the Tradition by the demonstration that careful judgment would support. Baḥya also argued that the words of Deuteronomy 32:6, "Do you thus repay the Lord, O foolish and unwise people?" apply to those who fail to reflect upon the obligation of the service of God.

Baḥya ibn Paquda read the words of Deuteronomy 32:6, "Is He not your Father who has acquired you? He has made you and established you?" to teach that God alone guides a person from the beginning of a person's existence and development. Baḥya cited this trait, in turn, as one of seven key factors that make it possible for one to trust in another.

Baḥya ibn Paquda read the words of Deuteronomy 32:15, "But Yeshurun grew fat, and kicked: you are grown fat, you are grown thick, you are covered with fatness; then he forsook God who made him, and lightly esteemed the Rock of his salvation," to support the proposition that if people were not forced to exert themselves in seeking a livelihood, they would kick, become defiant, and chase after sin, and they would ignore their debt of gratitude to God for God's goodness to them.

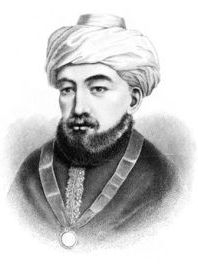
Maimonides

Maimonides taught that Scripture employs the idea of God's hiding God's face (as in Deuteronomy 32:20) to designate the manifestation of a certain work of God. Thus, Moses the prophet foretold misfortune by saying (in God's words in Deuteronomy 31:17), "And I will hide My face from them, and they shall be devoured." For Maimonides interpreted, when people are deprived of Divine protection, they are exposed to all dangers, and become the victim of circumstance, their fortune dependent on chance—a terrible threat. Further, Maimonides taught that the hiding of God's face results from human choice. When people do not meditate on God, they are separated from God, and they are then exposed to any evil that might befall them. For Maimonides taught, the intellectual link with God secures the presence of Providence and protection from evil accidents. Maimonides argued that this principle applies equally to a person and a whole community.

== In modern interpretation ==
The parashah is discussed in these modern sources:

G. Ernest Wright identified the genre of the poem in Deuteronomy 32:1–47 as a "covenant lawsuit" with the following components:

Verses	Content	Prophetic parallels
32:1–3	Call to the witnesses to give ear to the proceedings Amos 3:1; 4:1; 5:1	
32:4–6	Introductory statement of the case at issue Isaiah 1:2–3; Micah 6:2; Jeremiah 7:3–4	
32:7–14	Recital of the benevolent acts of the Suzerain	6:3–5; Jeremiah|2:5–7
32:15–18	The indictment	
32:19–29	The sentence	

Daniel Block, however, argued that the legal features of the song are "quite muted, taking second place to liturgical features." Block imagined the song as an anthem, recited antiphonally as follows in liturgy associated with the annual reading of the Torah at Sukkot.

Verses	Content	Speaker
32:1–3	Introduction	Leader of the service
32:4	Creedal affirmation	Congregation
	Pause	
32:5–6	Summary declaration of the indictment	Leader of the service
32:7	Call to remember God's grace	Leader of the service
32:8–14f	Recital of God's grace	Man or men in the assembly
32:14g–18	Declaration of the indictment of the people	Leader of the service
	Pause	
32:19–20a	Declaration of God's sentence	Leader of the service
32:20b–27c	Recitation of God's judgment speech	Priest or cultic prophet
32:27d–e	Declaration by the nations	Appointed man in the assembly
32:28–29	Description of the nations	Priest or cultic prophet
32:30	Question asked of the nations	Leader of the service
32:31	Declaration of the Israelites	Congregation
32:32–35	Recitation of God's description of Israel's enemies	Priest or cultic prophet
	Pause	
32:36–37a	Declaration of God's commitment to God's people	Priest or cultic prophet
32:37b–38	Recitation of Israel's challenge to the nations	Congregation
32:39–40	Recitation of God's judgment speech against the nations	Priest or cultic prophet
32:43	Concluding summons to praise	Congregation

Shakespeare

Harold Fisch described the witness function of the song as "a kind of time bomb; it awaits its hour and then springs forward into harsh remembrance."

Fisch argued that the words of Deuteronomy 32:2, "My doctrine shall drop as the rain, my speech shall distil as the dew; as the small rain upon the tender grass, and as the showers upon the herb", were echoed in the words Portia said to Shylock in The Merchant of Venice 4.1/190–192, of William Shakespeare's play The Merchant of Venice, "The quality of mercy is not strained. / It droppeth as the gentle rain from heaven / Upon the place beneath."

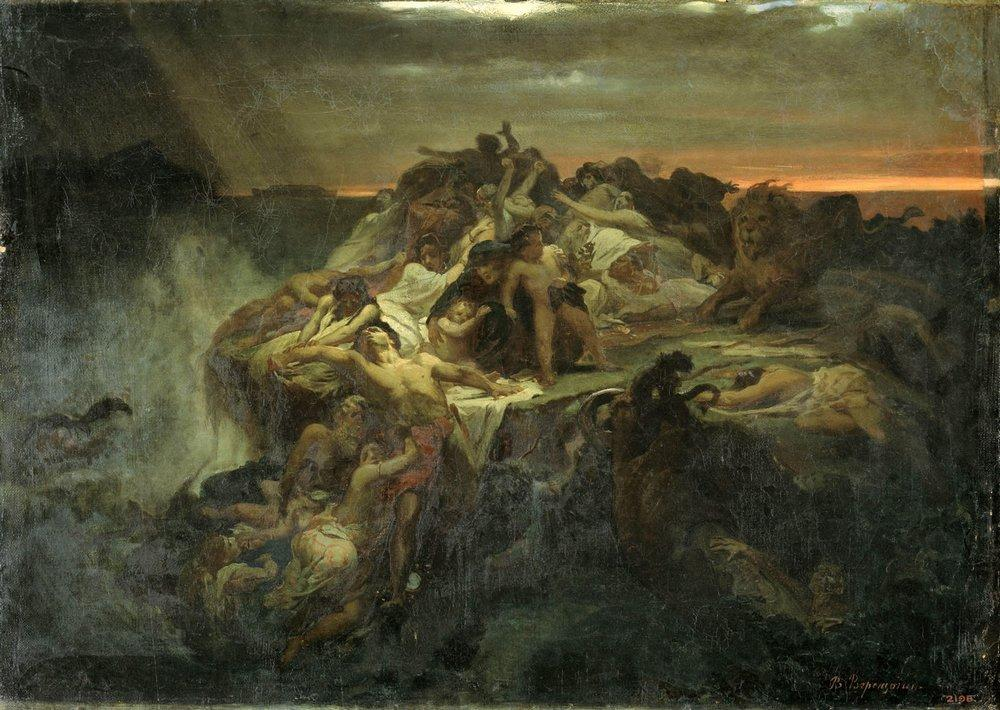
The deluge (1869 painting by Wassilij Petrovich Wereschtschagin)

A modern midrash interpreted the report of Deuteronomy 32:8 that God "fixed the boundaries of peoples in relation to Israel's number" (לְמִסְפַּר בְּנֵי יִשְׂרָאֵל, l'mispar b'nei Yisrael) to teach that before the days of Abraham, God dealt harshly with the world: The sins of Noah's generation resulted in the flood; the generation that built the Tower of Babel was dispersed throughout the globe, prompting the proliferation of languages; the sins of Sodom and Gomorrah were answered with fire and brimstone. According to the midrash, when Abraham came into the world, God ceased the cataclysmic punishments and set the punishments of other peoples in relationship to Israel's presence in the world. This midrash conveys that the Israelites' presence somehow lessened God's anger, bringing greater stability to the world. The midrash teaches that Jews, then, have a unique ability and responsibility to bring peace and stability to the world.

Neḥama Leibowitz noted that Deuteronomy 32:27 contains a "very daring anthropomorphism indeed, attributing to God the sentiment of fear."

Diagram of the Documentary Hypothesis

== In critical analysis ==
Some scholars who follow the Documentary Hypothesis find evidence of three separate sources in the parashah. Thus, some scholars consider the final counsel of Moses in Deuteronomy 32:45–47 to have been composed by the first Deuteronomistic historian (sometimes abbreviated Dtr 1) who wrote in the time of King Josiah of Judah, circa 622 BCE. Some scholars attribute the bulk of the parashah, Deuteronomy 32:1–44 to an insertion by the second Deuteronomistic historian (sometimes abbreviated Dtr 2) who wrote in the Babylonian captivity after 587 BCE. And then these scholars attribute the conclusion of the parashah, Deuteronomy 32:48–52 to a later Redactor (sometimes abbreviated R) who folded the Deuteronomic report into the context established at the end of the book of Numbers. For a color-coded display of verses according to this hypothesis, see the display of Deuteronomy according to the Documentary Hypothesis at Wikiversity.

In the Masoretic Text and the Samaritan Pentateuch, Deuteronomy 32:8 reports how God set the borders of the peoples according to the number of "the children of Israel." In a Qumran scroll (4QDeut^{j}) and the Septuagint, however, it is the number of "the children of God," whom Martin Abegg Jr., Peter Flint, and Eugene Ulrich suggested may mean the divine beings who would serve as protectors for the various nations. Professor Robert Alter argued that this phrase appears to reflect a very early stage in the evolution of biblical monotheism. Alter suggested that it caused later transmitters of the text theological discomfort and probably provoked these transmitters deliberately to change it in the interests of piety. In Alter's interpretation of the older world-picture, a celestial entourage of subordinate divine beings or lesser deities surrounded the supreme God. In Alter's reading, the original Deuteronomy 32:8 assumed that God, in allotting portions of the earth to the various peoples, also allowed each people its own lesser deity.

Similarly, in the Masoretic Text and the Samaritan Pentateuch, Deuteronomy 32:43 says, "Sing aloud, O you nations, of His people; for He avenges the blood of His servants, and renders vengeance to His adversaries, and makes expiation for the land of His people." But in another Qumran scroll (4QDeut^{q}, supported by the Septuagint), Deuteronomy 32:43 says, "Rejoice, O heavens, together with Him; and bow down to Him all you gods, for He will avenge the blood of His sons, and will render vengeance to His enemies, and will recompense those who hate Him, and will atone for the land of His people." Jeffrey Tigay suggested that scribes responsible for transmitting the text may have been concerned that readers not envision supernatural beings with power that would encourage the readers to worship these beings along with God.

== In Samaritan interpretation ==
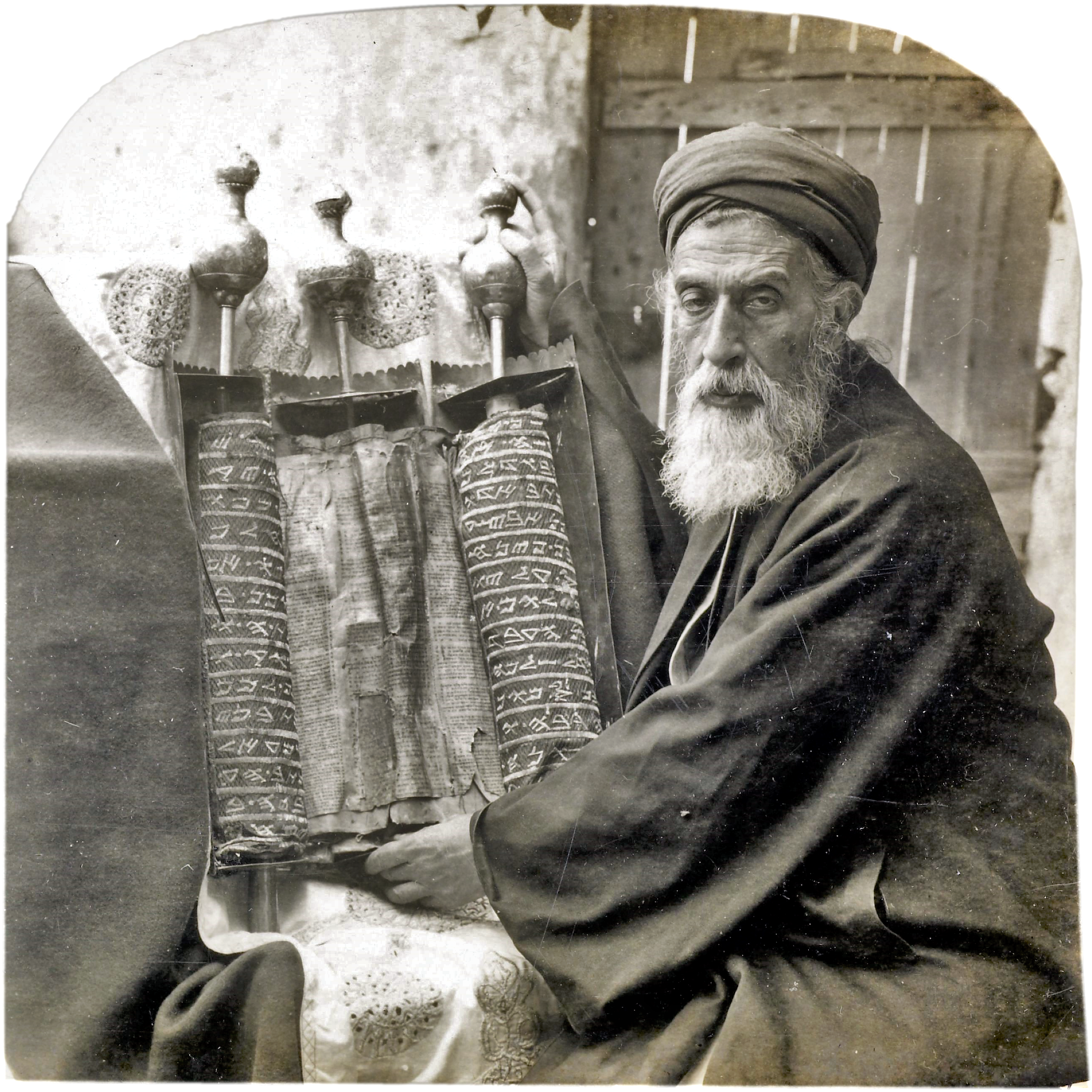
Samaritan High Priest and Old Pentateuch, 1905

As Samaritans accept only the Torah as prophetic and reject the rest of the Tanakh, they base their belief in the resurrection of the dead (ḥayyei ha-metim) entirely on Parashat Haazinu. In the Samaritan Pentateuch, the phrase "I kill and I make alive" in Deuteronomy 32:39 is pronounced Ani amit wa'aḥayei meaning "I kill and I return life," which is interpreted as "I will give life to the dead" or aḥayei et ha-met.

Deuteronomy 32:43, "and He will expiate His land and His people," or in Samaritan Hebrew wa'kiper admato amo, has led Samaritans to interpret the phrase amit wa'aḥayei in Deuteronomy 32:39 to mean that only the righteous of the people of Israel will experience the resurrection and have a place in the World To Come (Olam Haba). Samaritans consider themselves and Jews collectively to be the people of Israel, so they believe that Jews will experience resurrection of the dead just as Samaritans will. Samaritans see this as motivation for non-Samaritans and non-Jews (gentiles) to convert and join the people of Israel if they want to have a place in the World To Come.

== Commandments ==
Maimonides cites the parashah for one negative commandment:

- Not to drink wine of libation to idolatry

According to Sefer ha-Chinuch, however, there are no commandments in the parashah.

And according to others, the parashah contains a commandment to listen, hear, and learn one's ancestral history, as Deuteronomy 32:7–9 instructs one to "ask your father and he will tell you."

== In the liturgy ==
At the formal beginning of the K'riat Sh'ma prayer service, the leader recites the Barchu, "Praise Adonai, the Exalted One." The Sifre to Deuteronomy connects this practice to Deuteronomy 32:3, where Moses says, "I will proclaim the name of the Lord; ascribe greatness to our God."

In Deuteronomy 32:4, 15, 18, 30, and 31, Moses referred to God as "Rock" (צוּר, Tzur). The Jewish prayer book (סִדוּר, siddur) echoes this Name for God in many places—in the hymn Adon Olam, which Jews often sing in the morning (שַחֲרִת, Shacharit) prayer service; in one of the first blessings of the Shema (שְׁמַע), "He gives light to the Earth" (הַמֵּאִיר לָאָרֶץ, ha-meir laaretz) on weekdays or "All will thank you" (הַכֹּל יוֹדוּךָ, ha-kol yoducha) on Sabbaths, which Jews recite as part of the morning (שַחֲרִת, Shacharit) prayer service; in a following blessing of the Shema, "May You be blessed" (תִּתְבָּרַךְ, Titbarach); twice in another blessing of the Shema following the Shema, "True and firm" (אֱמֶת וְיַצִּיב, Emet veYatziv); in the blessing of the Shema following that, "So they were for our ancestors" (עַל הָרִאשׁוֹנִים, Al haRishonim); in the concluding words before the Amidah, "Rock of Israel" (צוּר יִשְׂרָאֵל, Tzur Yisraeil); in the Thanksgiving (מוֹדִים, Modim) prayer, which Jews recite as part of the Standing Prayer (עֲמִידָה, Amidah) that forms the central prayer of the morning (שַחֲרִת, Shacharit), additional (מוּסָף, Mussaf), afternoon (מִנחַה, Mincha), and evening (מַעֲרִיב, Maariv), prayer services; in the concluding prayer of the Standing Prayer (עֲמִידָה, Amidah), "My God, guard my tongue from evil," in each of those services; three times in the Supplication (תחנון, Tachanun) or bowing of the head after the weekday Standing Prayer (עֲמִידָה, Amidah); in Psalm 94:22, which Jews recite as the Psalm of the day on Wednesdays; in Psalm 92:16, which Jews recite as the Psalm of the day on the Sabbath; in Psalm 95:1, which Jews recite as the opening of the Kabbalat Shabbat (receiving or greeting the Sabbath) prayer service; in Psalm 92:16, which Jews recite after singing Lekhah Dodi in the Kabbalat Shabbat prayer service, and again as part of the hymnal verses (פסוקי דזמרא, Pesukei d'Zimrah) that begin the Sabbath morning (שַחֲרִת, Shacharit) prayer service; seven times in the Sabbath-eve song (זֶמֶר, zemer) The Rock from Whom We Have Eaten (צוּר מִשֶּׁלּוֹ אָכַלְנוּ, Tzur Mishelo Achalnu); in Psalm 19:15, which Jews recite as part of the hymnal verses (פסוקי דזמרא, Pesukei d'Zimrah) that begin the Sabbath morning (שַחֲרִת, Shacharit) prayer service; and in the blessing after reading the Haftarah.

Many Jews recite the words, "as an eagle that stirs up her nest, hovers over her young," from Deuteronomy 32:11 as part of the declaration of intent before donning the tallit.

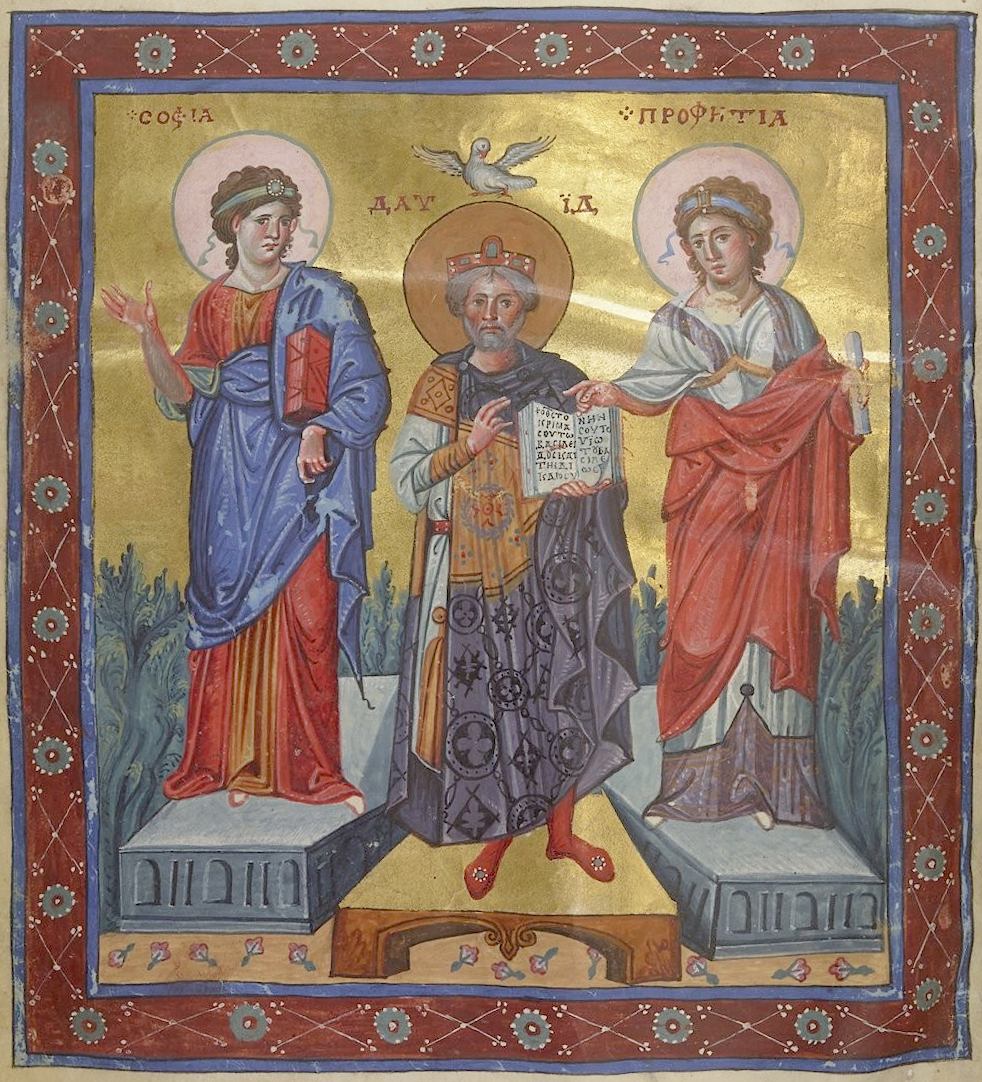
David between Wisdom and Prophecy (illustration from the 10th century Paris Psalter)

== Haftarah ==
=== Generally ===
The haftarah for the parashah is the song of David, 2 Samuel 22:1–51 (which is nearly identical to Psalm 18). Both the parashah and the haftarah set out the song of a great leader. Both the parashah (in Deuteronomy 32:4, 15, 18, 30, and 31) and the haftarah (in 2 Samuel 22:2, 3, 32, and 47) refer to God as a "Rock." Both the parashah (in Deuteronomy 32:4) and the haftarah (in 2 Samuel 22:24, 26, and 33) use the Hebrew word תָּמִים, tamim, to refer to God or David as "perfect," "blameless," or "secure." Both the parashah (in Deuteronomy 32:5) and the haftarah (in 2 Samuel 22:27) use rare words to refer to the "perverse" (עִקֵּשׁ, ikeish) and "wily" (פְתַלְתֹּל, petaltol; תִּתַּפָּל, titapal). Both the parashah (in Deuteronomy 32:15–21) and the haftarah (in 2 Samuel 22:26–28) teach that Providence repays human actions in kind. Both the parashah (in Deuteronomy 32:23–26 and 41–43) and the haftarah (in 2 Samuel 22:14–16) describe God in martial terms, shooting arrows (חִצַּי, chitzai; חִצִּים, chitzim) (Deuteronomy 32:23, 42; 2 Samuel 22:15) and punishing enemies (אוֹיֵב, oyeiv) (Deuteronomy 32:27, 42; 2 Samuel 22:4, 18, 38, 41, 49).

=== On Shabbat Shuva ===
When Parashat Haazinu coincides with the special Sabbath Shabbat Shuvah (the Sabbath before Yom Kippur, as it does in 2023, 2024, and 2026), the haftarah is Hosea 14:2–10, Micah 7:18–20, and Joel 2:15–27.
