= Battle of Mount Tabor (biblical) =

Battle during the time of the Judges between Canaan and the Israelite army

- Part of Later Israelite Campaigns
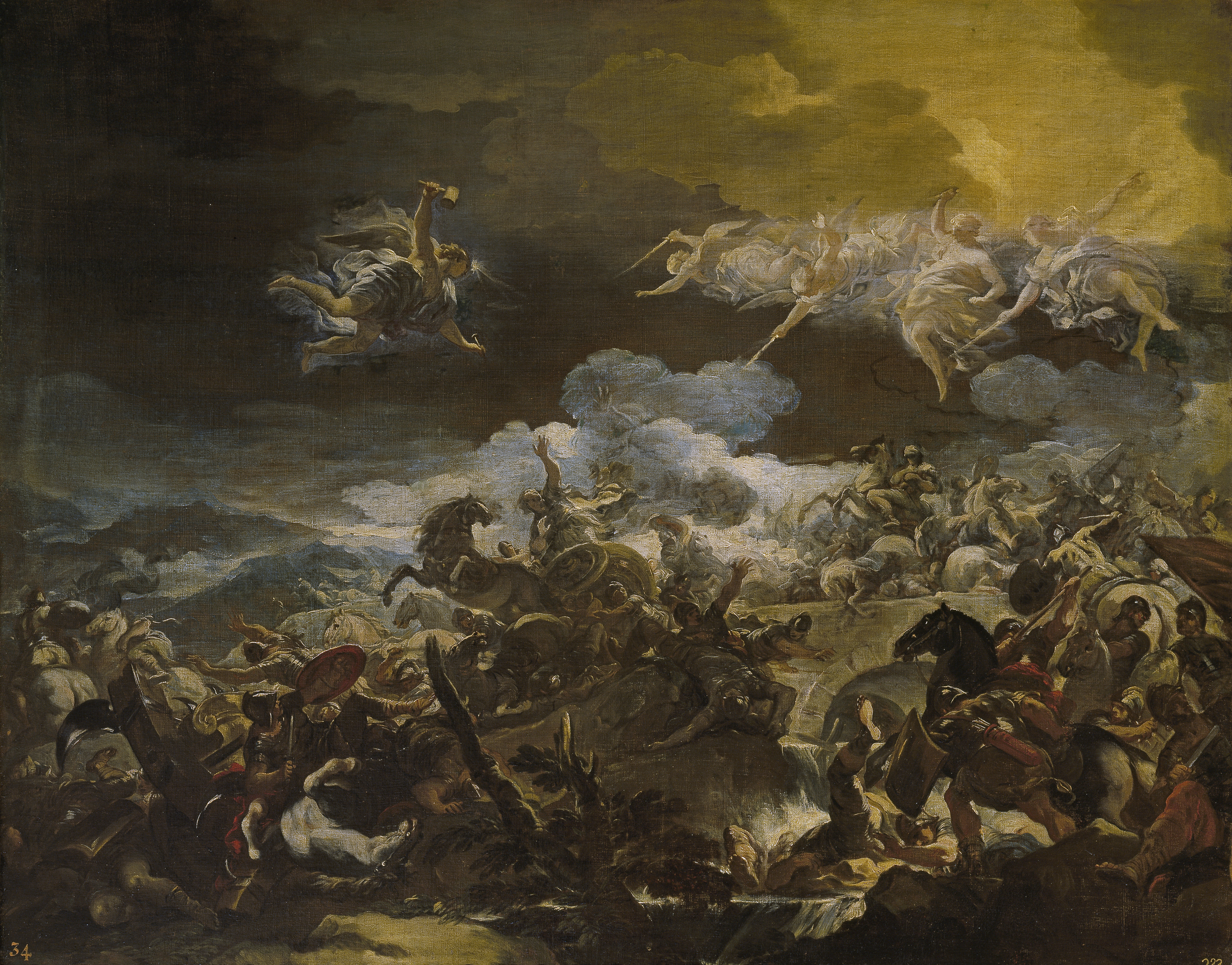
- Luca Giordano, The Defeat of Sisera, c. 1692
| Date | Mid 12th century BCE |
| Location | Mount Tabor, Israel |
| Result | Israelite victory |

Belligerents
| Israelites | Canaanites |

Commanders and leaders
| Deborah; Barak; Jael | Sisera †; King of Hazor |

Strength
| 10,000 men recruited from the tribes of Naphtali and Zebulun, primarily light infantry and light cavalry | Number of men not mentioned 900 iron chariots |

Casualties and losses
| Relatively low | Relatively high |

According to the Book of Judges (chapters 4 and 5) of the Hebrew Bible, the Battle of Mount Tabor was a military confrontation between the forces of King Jabin of Canaan, who ruled from Hazor, and the Israelite army led by Barak and Deborah. The battle took place at Mount Tabor in Lower Galilee, at the eastern end of the Jezreel Valley, 18 kilometres (11 mi) west of the Sea of Galilee, sometime between 1150 and 1075 BCE, during the time of the Judges of the Hebrew Bible.

== Biblical account ==
=== Background ===
The Israelites had been oppressed for twenty years by the Canaanite king Jabin and by the captain of his army, Sisera, who commanded a force of nine hundred iron chariots. At this time, the prophetess Deborah was judging Israel. She summoned the general Barak, telling him that God commanded him to march on Mount Tabor with an Israelite army and that God had promised he would deliver the Canaanites into Barak's hand(Judges 4:2–7).

Barak was hesitant and told Deborah that he would not undertake the campaign unless she accompanied him. The prophetess agreed to come, but scolded Barak, telling him "I will surely go with you; nevertheless, the road on which you are going will not lead to your glory, for the Lord will sell Sisera into the hand of a woman," (Judges 4:8–9). Deborah, Barak and the army gathered at Kedesh, its number rising to 10,000 warriors recruited from the tribes of Naphtali and Zebulun, who would have fought as light infantry and light cavalry.

=== Battle ===
The Israelite army marched to Mount Tabor. Their movements were reported to Sisera, who hastened to the torrent Kishon, near Mount Tabor. The Song of Deborah says that the Canaanite army was swept away by the Kishon (Judges 5:21). This is commonly interpreted to mean that God caused a strong rainstorm, causing a flash flood at the Wadi Kishon, sweeping many away. The Canaanites panicked and fled, and the Israelites pursued them and slew them to the last man (Judges 4:15–16).

Sisera left his chariot and ran for his life. Sisera reached the tent of Jael, wife of Heber the Kenite, and she offered him shelter, as the Kenites were not at war with the Canaanites. Jael hid Sisera and gave him some milk to drink, but killed him after he fell asleep by pounding a tent peg through his temple (Judges 4:17–22).
