= Butter in a Lordly Dish =

Radio play by Agatha Christie

The billing from the Radio Times issue of 11–17 January 1948, illustrating the first broadcast of Butter in a Lordly Dish

Butter in a Lordly Dish is the name of a half-hour radio play written by Agatha Christie and first performed on the BBC Radio Light Programme on Tuesday 13 January 1948 at 9.30pm on Mystery Playhouse presents The Detection Club. It was repeated on Friday 16 January at 4.15pm.

== History ==
Butter in a Lordly Dish remains one of Christie's least-known works. The title comes from the Bible, at Judges, 5:25 – "He asked water, and she gave him milk; she brought forth butter in a lordly dish", where "he" refers to Sisera, "she" is Jael, and Jael kills Sisera by hammering a nail through his head. The same fate awaits Sir Luke Enderby in Christie's play at the hands of Julia Keene. Jack Malvern, of The Times called it "one of Agatha Christie’s most gruesome murder plots."

The play was one of a series of six written by members of the Detection Club to raise funds for the organisation. The other five plays and their first broadcasts (all on Tuesdays at 9.30pm) are as follows:

- The Murder at Warbeck Hall by Cyril Hare, broadcast on 27 January 1948
- A Nice Cup of Tea by Anthony Gilbert, broadcast on 3 February 1948
- Sweet Death by Christianna Brand on 10 February 1948
- Bubble, Bubble, Toil and Trouble by E. C. R. Lorac on 17 February 1948
- Where Do We Go From Here? by Dorothy L Sayers on 24 February 1948

The play received its first production since 1948 as part of the Agatha Christie Theatre Festival in 2001 at the Palace Theatre, Westcliff-on-Sea and has occasionally been performed since as a special event. The play was included in Murder on Air, a special production from 22 April to 3 May 2008 by the Agatha Christie Theatre Company of three of Christie's radio plays (the other two being The Yellow Iris and Personal Call) at the Theatre Royal, Windsor. It was also staged as part of the Agatha Christie’s The BBC Murders, production at the Parker Playhouse in South Florida in 2013.

== Discovery ==
It was thought that no recording existed. However, it was found, along with two other lost plays, amid uncatalogued material by freelance audio producer Charles Norton and BBC sound archivist Sean Whyton. Recordings of the plays were released on 17 September 2015 as a CD and as a digital download entitled The Lost Plays, published by BBC Audio, part of Penguin Random House, two days after the 125th anniversary of Agatha Christie’s birth.

== Plot summary ==
In a boarding house off the Pimlico Road run by a Mrs. Petter, one of the guests, Julia Keene, is taking her leave after staying there for a short time. Mrs. Petter's daughter, Florrie, having seen Julia leaving a posh cocktail party in a house in Mayfair, wonders why the lady has been lodging with them. Florrie has elaborate and fanciful suspicions that Julia is involved in a gang of cat burglars and her job is to stake out the territory ahead of the other gang members. Florrie's mother scoffs at her daughter's ideas.

The talk turns to other crimes and the latest news in the papers of a trial at the Old Bailey involving a taxi driver where the jury is still out considering its verdict. Florrie is scornful of the judge's summing up but praises the reported prosecution speech by Sir Luke Enderby. He is a well-known King's Counsel who came to public attention for successfully prosecuting a man called Henry Garfield in a serial killer case known as the "Blondes on the Beach". The accused was a good-looking man who attracted women and Mrs. Petter uses this example as an excuse to tell her daughter to be careful of the men that she meets. Their conversation is interrupted by Julia who asks to use their telephone. She is left alone to make the call and she rings up a house in Chishold Gardens where she asks to speak to Sir Luke Enderby...

Hayward, the servant, tells Julia over the phone that Sir Luke is not yet back from the Old Bailey. After finishing the phone call, Hayward lets in a visitor to the house – Susan Warren, a society lady. Sir Luke arrives soon afterwards from the trial having won his guilty verdict. Soon afterwards his wife arrives back home after a day out at Christie's and she and Susan soon talk of the nature of juries and the verdicts they reach – particularly when there are a number of women on the jury who might be influenced by their feelings for the accused. Like Mrs. Petter and Florrie they cite the case of Garfield and the "Blondes on the Beach".

Sir Luke announces that he is leaving for Liverpool that night on another case to the surprise of Lady Enderby who knew nothing of this plan. He soon goes and Susan sympathises with Lady Enderby on her husband's constant infidelities. Lady Enderby is philosophical – at least he wasn't unfaithful on their honeymoon ten years ago! He is devoted to their boys and kind and considerate to her. She is sure that his flings are just that – meaningless encounters.

Arriving at Paddington, Sir Luke meets his latest flame – Julia Keene. They get on the train and travel to a station strangely called ' Warning Halt'. From there they walk across the fields to an isolated cottage that Julia has found for their tryst where she has already brought in food for a meal. After a cheerful fire has been lit she brings in a meal of food rarely seen in the days of rationing including duck, pate and a large dish of butter – "Butter in a Lordly Dish" as Julia names it.

After their meal, she pours him coffee and once again the talk turns to the nature of Sir Luke's work. Julia asks him if he is troubled that his eloquence can lead to the execution of man and she also brings up the subject of Henry Garfield. Sir Luke tells her that there was no doubt as to the man's guilt in his view: he had known associations with the victims and he only avoided arrest the first few times due to alibis supplied by his wife. She might also have swayed the trial but for the fact that she was ill in hospital at the time with typhoid.

Sir Luke is suddenly troubled with a cramp in his leg and the phrase "Butter in a Lordly Dish" is also concerning him. His cramps get worse and his eyesight also starts to become fuzzy. Nevertheless, he is still able to see somewhat and is puzzled by Julia's actions as she picks up a hammer and nail. She mentions Sisera and Jael and Sir Luke is reminded where the phrase "Butter in a Lordly Dish" comes from.

As his condition further deteriorates Julia confesses three things: That she has drugged his coffee; that she is not Julia Keene but Julia Garfield; and that she and not her husband killed all the women with whom Henry Garfield was having affairs. Unlike Lady Enderby, she was not prepared to put up with her husband's infidelities but nevertheless she still loved him. As Sir Luke struggles to move, Julia completes the biblical allusion by hammering a nail into his head...

== 1948 Radio production ==
Director/Producer: Martyn C. Webster

Cast:
Richard Williams played Sir Luke Enderby, KC
Lydia Sherwood played Lady Enderby
Rita Vale played Julia Keene
Thea Wells played Susan Warren
Dora Gregory played Mrs Petter
Jill Nyasa played Florrie
Janet Morrison played Hayward
David Kossoff played Porter
