= Abinoam =

Biblical figure

- Born: Kedesh, Naphtali
- Known for: Father of Barak, who defeated Jabin's army led by Sisera
- Children: Barak

In the Hebrew Bible, Abinoam (a-bin'-o-am, ab-i-no'-am, Biblical Hebrew: אבינעם), from Kedesh-naphtali, was the father of Barak who defeated Jabin's army, led by Sisera. He is mentioned in Judges 4:6, 4:12, 5:1, and 5:12.

The name means "the (divine) father is pleasantness". Where the Masoretic Text of the Hebrew Bible reads Avinoam, the Greek Septuagint manuscripts read Ab[e]ineem or Iabin.
