= Personal Call =

1954 half-hour radio play written by Agatha Christie

Personal Call is a half-hour radio play written by Agatha Christie and first performed on the BBC Radio Light Programme on Monday, 31 May 1954. The play reuses the character of Inspector Narracott from the 1931 novel The Sittaford Mystery.

== Background ==
Christie's official biography states that the play was written after she and her husband, Max Mallowan, returned from their annual summer season at the archaeological dig at Nimrud in 1952. The producer of the play, Ayton Whitaker, found the script to be "first rate" saying that it made, "full use of radio techniques and possibilities." It appears that Christie either did not specify Newton Abbot as one of the locales in the play or was happy for it to be changed, saying, "Any station will do. Newton Abbot telephone boxes and station geography would have to be vetted, of course."

In 1960, the BBC remade the play, this time produced by David H. Godfrey, and it was again transmitted on the Light Programme, this time at 9.30pm on Tuesday, 29 November. No cast members from the 1954 production took part in this later version which was reviewed by Frederick Laws in The Listener who said it, "worked as neatly as those alarm clocks which also serve you with a cup of tea. It also did a bit of dodgy problem-solving of the sort psychologists allege that the mind does in sleep. And it only cheated, supernaturally, a little bit. It seemed, you see, as though a ghost was using the telephone service. Confident that neither the PMG (Postmaster General), the powers above, nor Miss Christie would permit this, one waited, and the disclosure was suitably remarkable." He concluded, "The detective story, against all probability, seems to be coming back to radio."

The play has never been commercially published and received its first production since 1960 as part of the Agatha Christie Theatre Festival in 2001 at the Palace Theatre, Westcliff-on-Sea and has occasionally been performed since as a special event. The play was included in Murder on Air, a special production from 22 April to 3 May 2008 by the Agatha Christie Theatre Company of three of Christie's radio plays (the other two being The Yellow Iris and Butter in a Lordly Dish) at the Theatre Royal, Windsor.

== Plot summary ==
A cocktail party is in full flow at the Kensington home of James and Pam Brent when there is a phone call. Mrs. Lamb, the Brents' housekeeper fetches James and the operator puts the call through. He hears a slightly ethereal voice that claims to be that of a woman called Fay. James is shocked and angry and demands to know who the caller really is. She repeats that she is Fay, she is at Newton Abbot railway station and that she is waiting for him. Pam comes into the hall from the party and James, shaken, slams the phone down but refuses to say who the caller was. He sends her back to look after his guests and rings the operator to find out where the call came from. He is stunned to find out that no call has been put through to his house that day. Pam comes back from the party again, suspicious about what is going on. James tries to reassure her that there is no problem. Pam tells him that she has invited two friends who she has not seen for a long time to come round and play bridge tomorrow.

At a railway station a woman asks a porter where the telephone kiosk is for long-distance calls. After she has been pointed in the right direction, the porter turns to his colleague and tells him that she reminds him of someone – someone connected with the matter of a dead woman.

James and Pam are playing bridge with Evan and Mary Curtis when another call comes through. After James has gone into the hall to take it, Pam confesses to Mary that she is worried as yesterday's call upset him so much. Mary suggests she listens in on the bedroom extension. Pam does so and hears as "Fay" speaks to James again. He demands to know who she is and where she is ringing from. For confirmation, she opens the door of the kiosk and he hears the guard's cry announcing Newton Abbot railway station. Fay asks if he has noticed the time – it is 7.15pm and she tells him that she is waiting for him. Again, James slams the phone down. His friends notice his shaken condition when he returns to them and he tells them he has a headache. They decide to leave him, promising to see James and Pam again after their trip to France, which starts the day after tomorrow. They go and soon after Pam asks who Fay is and confesses to listening in to the call. James tells her that Fay was the name he called his first wife, despite the fact that Pam knew her name to be Florence and that she died a year ago. James tells her the death was an accident. They were at Newton Abbot station and Fay, suffering a dizzy spell, fell under the path of an oncoming train – at 7.15pm. James tries to dismiss the incident of the spectral phone, looking forward to their trip to France.

The next day, Pam receives a phone call from Mr Enderby, their lawyer. He has seen to the matter of their will as arranged and now wants to know if he should retain it or should he send it on to their bank. Pam tells him the bank and Mr Enderby concludes the call by wishing her a pleasant and relaxing holiday and he hopes that she will recover from the dizzy spells she has been suffering from that James had told him about. Shaken, Pam thanks him and finishes the call – she has not been suffering from any dizzy spells but before she can puzzle the matter out, she receives a second call. The ghostly caller announces herself as Fay Mortimer and tells Pam not to travel to France in a train with James. After the call is finished, James comes home and Pam asks him who Fay Mortimer is – she thought his first wife's name was Garland. James is furious but Pam is determined to go to Newton Abbot the next day and to be there at 7.15pm to see what is happening. If James will not go with her, she will go alone.

The next day the two are at the station at the appointed time. Pam makes James talk through the sequence of events of what happened the year before and James tells again of Fay's dizzy spells. Pam uses this prompt to tell James of Mr. Enderby's comments on the phone yesterday. James is annoyed but before the conversation can progress, Fay herself walks along the platform towards them, saying that she has been waiting for him since he pushed her under the train the year before. Shocked and panicking, James backs off and falls into the path of a train passing through. Pam faints.

She comes to in the office of the station master with Inspector Narracott of the police bending over her. He tells her that her husband is dead. It is fortunate for her as he has little doubt that she would not have survived the trip to France. James has murdered three wives before in the same fashion: one in Scandinavia, one in Wales and the last one here at Newton Abbot a year ago. She is introduced to "Fay" – it is, in fact, the dead girl's mother who, her voice sounding similar and made-up to look younger, agreed to help the police trap the murderer of her daughter. The first time she rang she was in London, the second time was in Newton Abbot but no one was in the third time she called. Pam tells her she was mistaken – she spoke to her and warned her not to travel by train with James. Fay's mother tells her that it is she who is mistaken. She has never spoken with Pam before. Pam is more disconcerted than ever – who did she speak to?

== 1954 production ==
Programme billing for the first performance of Personal Call from the Radio Times of 28 May 1954 with accompanying illustration by Victor Reinganum.

- Produced by Ayton Whitaker
- Jessie Evans as Fay
- James McKechnie as James Brent
- Mary Wimbush as Pam Brent
- Joan Sanderson as Mrs. Lamb
- Hamilton Dyce as Evan Curtis
- Janet Burnell as Mary Curtis
- Norman Chidgey as Mr. Enderby
- Edgar Norfolk as Inspector Narracott
- With: Sulwen Morgan, Cyril Shaps, Peter Claughton, Dorothy Clement, Alan Reid, Hugh David and Ruth Cracknell

== 1960 production ==
- Produced by David H. Godfrey
- Vivienne Chatterton as Mrs. Lamb
- Ivan Brandt as James Brent
- Beatrice Bevan as Fay
- Barbara Lott as Pamela Brent
- George Hagan as Inspector Narracott
- James Thomason as Mr. Enderby
- William Eedle as Man/Porter
- Charles Simon as 2nd Porter/Station Announcer
- Michael Turner as Evan/Man
- Eva Stuart as Mary/Woman
- Penelope Lee as Operator/Woman
