= Jael =

Biblical figure

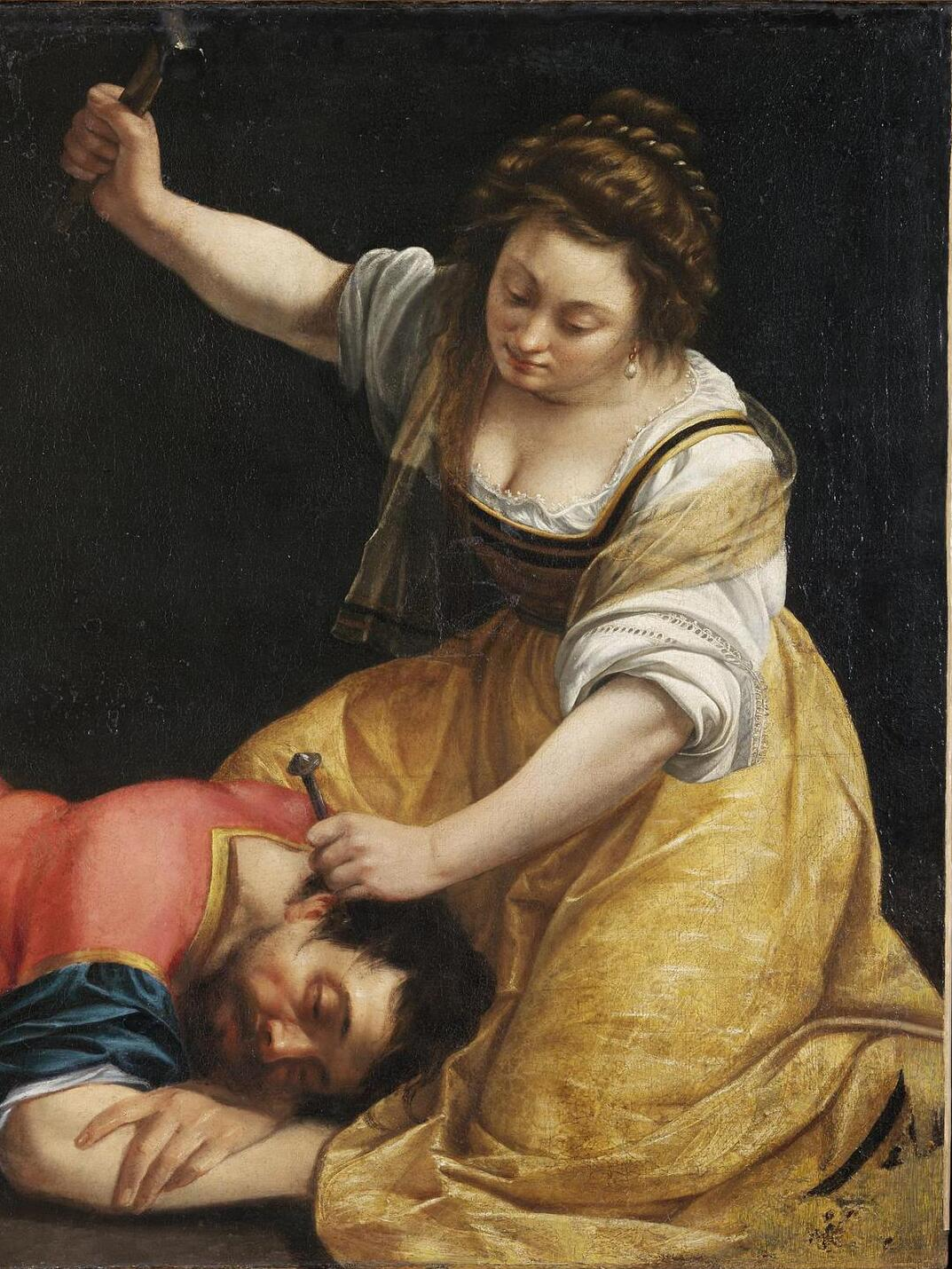
- Detail from Jael and Sisera by Artemisia Gentileschi, 1620
- Known for: Defeating Sisera
- Spouse: Heber the Kenite

Jael (/ˈdʒeɪəl/) or Yael (/ˈjeɪəl/; Hebrew: יָעֵל, romanized: Yāʿēl) is a heroine of the Bible who aids the Israelites in their war with King Jabin of the city of Hazor in Canaan by killing Sisera, the commander of Jabin's army. This episode is depicted in chapters 4 and 5 of the Book of Judges. According to that account, after Sisera's defeat by the Israelite leader Barak in the Battle of Mount Tabor, he seeks refuge in the tent of Jael, who kills him by driving a tent peg through his skull (Judges 4:17–21) near the great tree in Zaanaim near Kedesh.

== Name ==
The Hebrew ya'el means ibex, a nimble, sure-footed mountain goat native to the Levant region.

As of 2018, Yael was one of the most common female first names in contemporary Israel.

== Family ==
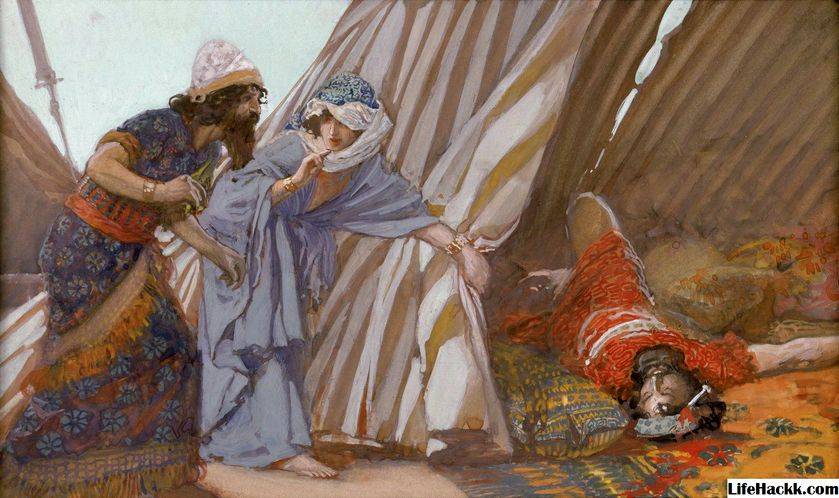
Jael shows Sisera lying dead to Barak, James Tissot, 1896–1902

Jael has often been understood to be the wife of Heber the Kenite. However, the Hebrew phrase translated this way could also mean "a woman of the group of the Kenites". The Kenites were a nomadic tribe—possibly a subset of the Midianites—some of whom lived in close proximity to the Israelites. The Hebrew Bible records a number of cases of intermarriage between the Kenites and the Israelites.

=== Heber the Kenite ===
Heber the Kenite (חבר הקיני) was, according to the Book of Judges, a descendant of Jethro the Midianite, the father-in-law of Moses. He had separated himself and his wife Jael from the other Kenites and pitched their tent in the plain of Zaanaim, which is near Kedesh in the territory of the Tribe of Naphtali.

== Jael in the Book of Judges ==
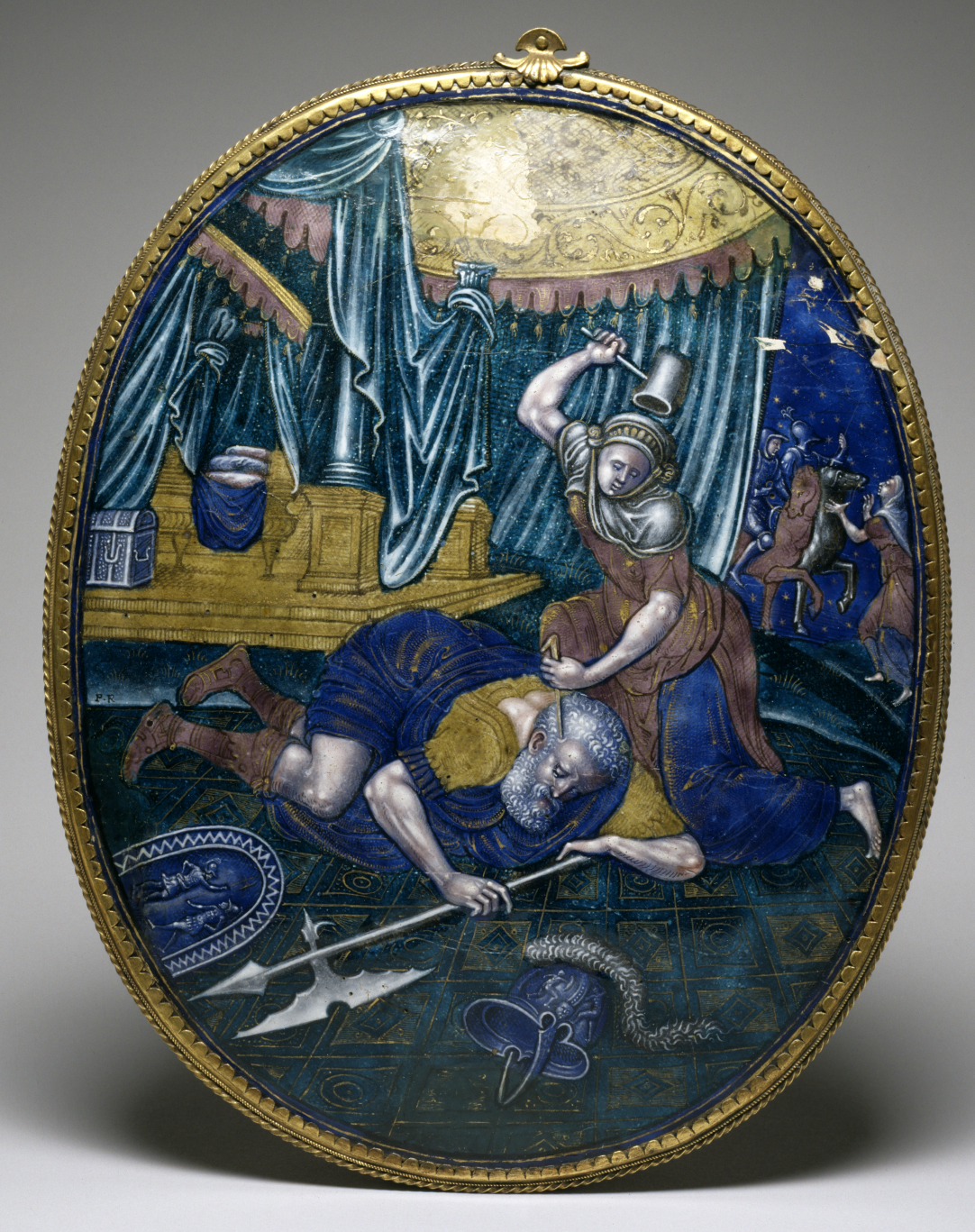
Limoges enamel plaque, 1550–1575

Deborah, a prophetess and judge, advised Barak to mobilize the tribes of Naphtali and Zebulon on Mount Tabor to do battle against King Jabin of Canaan. Barak demurred, saying he would go, provided she would also. Deborah agreed, but prophesied that the honor of defeating Jabin's army would then go to a woman. Jabin's army was led by Sisera (Judges 4:2). The armies met on the Plain of Esdraelon, where Sisera's iron-bound chariots became hampered by the mud caused by a downpour during the night that caused the Wadi Kishon to overflow its banks. The Canaanites were defeated, and Sisera fled the scene.

Sisera arrived on foot at the tent of Heber on the plain of Zaanaim. Heber and his household were at peace with Jabin, the king of Canaan, who reigned in Hazor (Judges 4:17). Jael (whose tent would have been separate from Heber's) welcomed Sisera into her tent and covered him with a blanket. Sisera asked Jael for a drink of water; she gave him milk instead. He commanded Jael to watch over the tent and tell any inquirers that no one was there. Quietly, Jael took a mallet and drove a tent peg through Sisera's temple into the ground while he was sleeping, killing him instantly. Jael was then the woman with the honor of defeating Jabin's army, as prophesied by Deborah, and she showed Barak Sisera's dead body in her tent. The "Song of Deborah" (Judges 5:24–26) recounts:

Extolled above women be Jael,
Extolled above women in the tent.
He asked for water, she gave him milk;
She brought him cream in a lordly dish.
She stretched forth her hand to the nail,
Her right hand to the workman's hammer,
And she smote Sisera; she crushed his head,
She crashed through and transfixed his temples.

Composed in archaic biblical Hebrew, the Song of Deborah has been traditionally identified as among the oldest texts of the Bible, and perhaps even the earliest example of Hebrew poetry. Although some scholars claim a date as early as the 12th century BC, others claim it to be as late as the 3rd century BC (i.e., the Second Temple period). Based on its language and content, the current consensus is that the song was written no earlier than the 7th century BC.

== In ancient and medieval literature ==
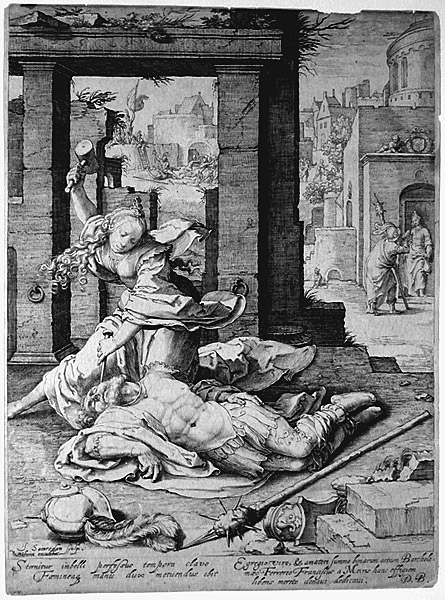
Jan Saenredam engraving picturing Jael killing Sisera

Pseudo-Philo refers to Jael in the book, Liber Antiquitatum Biblicarum:

Now Jael took a stake in her left hand and approached him, saying, "If God will work this sign with me, I know that Sisera will fall into my hands. Behold I will throw him down on the ground from the bed on which he sleeps; and if he does not feel it, I know that he has been handed over." And Jael took Sisera and pushed him onto the ground from the bed. But he did not feel it, because he was very groggy.

And Jael said, "Strengthen in me today, Lord, my arm on account of you and your people and those who hope in you." And Jael took the stake and put it on his temple and struck it with a hammer.

And while he was dying, Sisera said to Jael, "Behold pain has taken hold of me, Jael, and I die like a woman."

And Jael said to him, "Go, boast before your father in hell and tell him that you have fallen into the hands of a woman."

According to the Talmud, Jael engaged in sexual intercourse with Sisera seven times, but because she was attempting to exhaust him in order to kill him, her sin was for Heaven's sake and therefore praiseworthy. The significance of that exact number of coituses and the meaning of the multicoital nature of Jael and Sisera's encounter has been discussed in the scholarship, along with an alternate view in rabbinic literature that assert quite to the contrary that Jael never engaged in sex with Sisera.

There is also a reference to the story of Jael in Geoffrey Chaucer's The Canterbury Tales. During the Wife of Bath's Prologue, and whilst discussing her fifth husband's "book of wikked wives", Chaucer mentions some wives who "han drive nailes in hir brain, / Whil that they slepte, and thus they had hem slain."

== Commentary ==
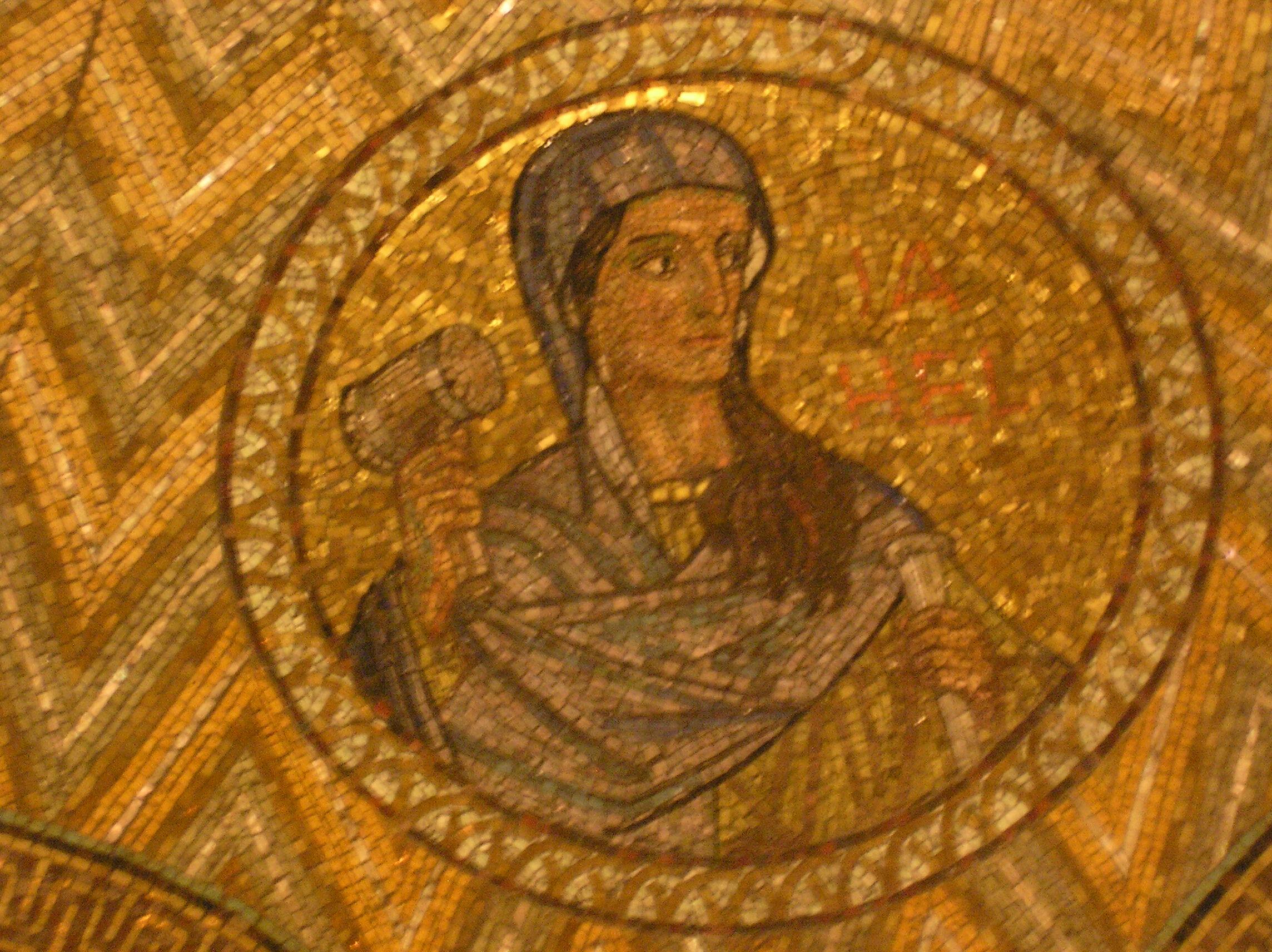
Mosaic at the Dormition Church in Jerusalem

Judges 4:17 states that there was peace between the Canaanites and Heber's clan. They were familiar to the Israelites through the connection of Jethro to Moses, and their skill as metalworkers was welcomed wherever they camped. Both sides in the conflict would have considered the Kenites a neutral party. C. E. Schenk notes that Sisera was Jael's guest, "was in the sanctuary of her home, and protected by the laws of hospitality."

According to Herbert Lockyer she may have acted out of practical necessity. Sisera was in flight and Barak in pursuit. It would not have been wise to allow Barak to find Sisera in her tent. She also knew that Sisera would be killed if captured; therefore, she would kill him and thus cement a friendship with the victor. Biblical commentaries have viewed Jael as either a heroine or someone much less so. Newsom and Ringe consider her a survivor caught up in her husband's politics.

Parallels between the details of Jael's actions and Ehud's assassination of Eglon have led van Wijk-Bos to propose Jael as killing Sisera in a manner similar to his conquering army's use of rape. Jael, along with Ehud, is an example in Judges of the contrast between marginal heroes and well-armed enemies conquered by wit and stealth. Albert Barnes conjectures that Jael sympathized with the Israelites because of the twenty-year period of harsh oppression inflicted on them by Jabin. Noting the maternal and erotic undertones of the text and some commentators' qualms about Jael's seductive and violent act, Bachmann points out that the Bible itself has nothing but praise for Jael, called most blessed of women in the Song of Deborah. Christian moral theorists during the Renaissance extensively referred to Jael as an example of tyrannicide.

== Artistic depictions of Jael ==
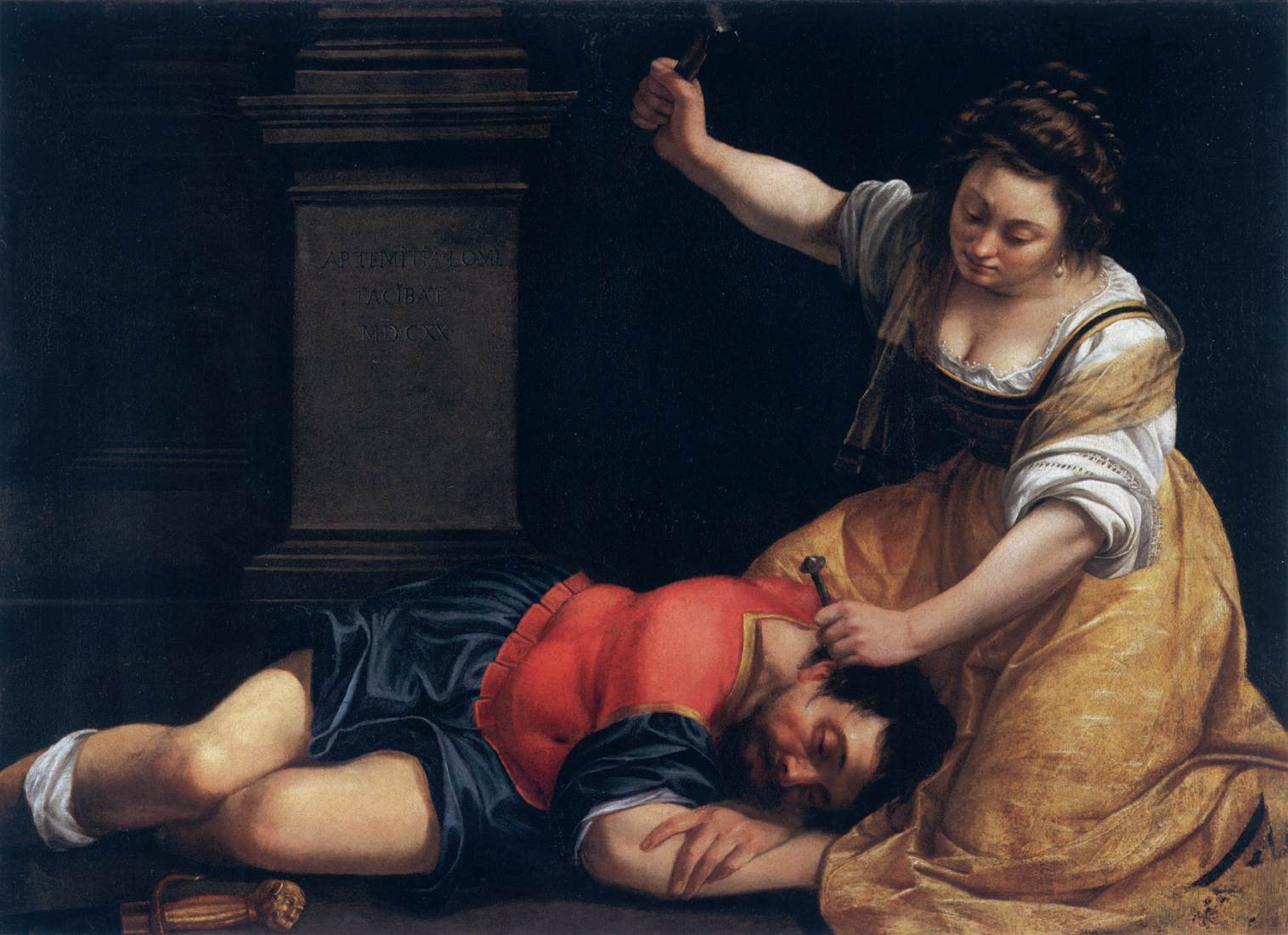
Jael and Sisera, by Artemisia Gentileschi

Medieval images of Jael, mostly in illuminated manuscripts, depicted her as both a defender of Israel and a prefiguration of the Virgin Mary.

In Renaissance works the subject is one of the most commonly shown in the Power of Women topos, with other biblical women who triumphed over men, such as Judith or Delilah. Here she was used to show the risk for men in following women, in groupings including positive figures and scenes such as Judith beheading Holofernes, but mostly ones with females depicted as over-powerful, such as Phyllis riding Aristotle, Samson and Delilah, Salome and her mother Herodias and the Idolatry of Solomon. More positively, Jael was included in sets of the female Nine Worthies, such as the prints by Hans Burgkmair. Ladies sometimes chose to have their portraits painted as Jael, a transformation achieved by holding a hammer and spike.

== See also ==
- Kenite hypothesis
