= Zaanaim =

Location in the Hebrew Bible

Zaanaim, Zaanannim or Bezaanaim is a place name applied to one or two locations in the Hebrew Bible. According to Serge Frolov (2013), its location "cannot be determined with any degree of certainty."

The area was likely given the name Zaanaim because nomads camped there in tents among the towns and cities, with the name meaning "wanderings" or "the unloading of tents."

According to Joshua 19:33, the border of the tribe of Naftali passed by the "oak in Zaanannim" (Revised Version).

According to Judges 4:11, Heber the Kenite's tent, in which Jael killed Sisera, was "as far as the oak in Zaanannim" (Revised Version). Where the Revised Version reads "oak," the King James Version reads "plain." According to Cheyne and Black, an acceptable alternative reading for "oak" in these passages is "terebinth".

Where the Revised Version has "in Zaanannim" above, the Hebrew text reads bṣʿnnym. It has been, however, suggested by some that, following the Septuagint and the Talmud, the letter "b", which in Hebrew means "in," should be taken as a part of the word following, and the phrase would then be "unto the oak of Bitzanaim," a place which has been identified with the ruins of Bessum, about half-way between Tiberias and Mount Tabor.
