= Sisera =

Biblical army commander

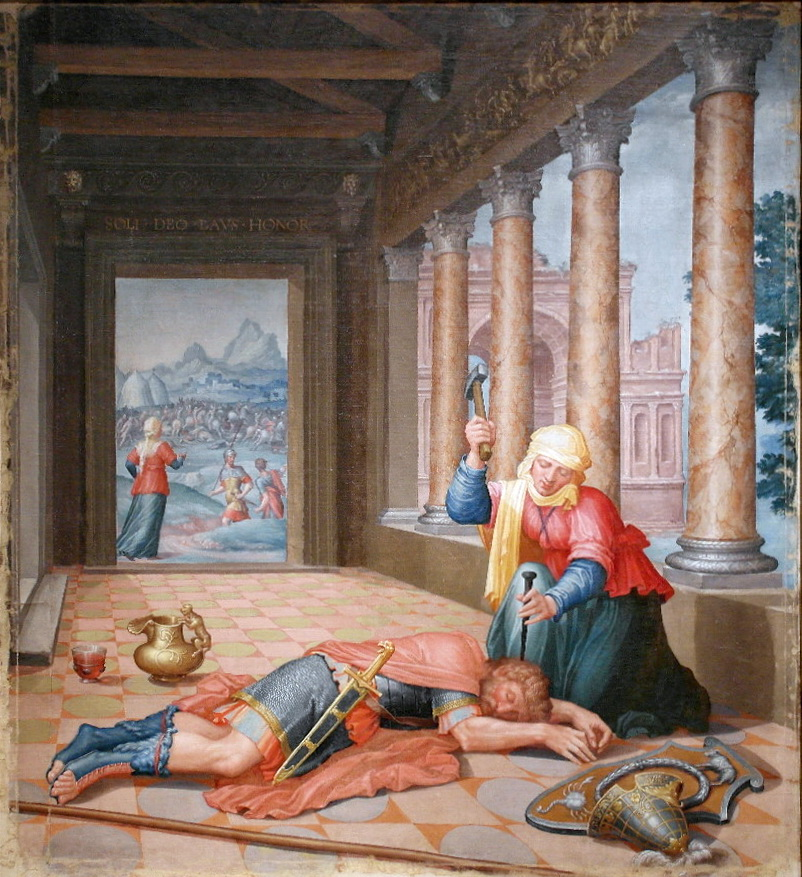
- Yael Killing Sisera, by Lambert Lombard, 1530–1535
- Born: Unknown
- Died: c. 1200 BCE; Tent of Jael, Plain of Zaanaim
- Occupation: Military commander
- Known for: Commander of the Canaanite army under King Jabin, killed by Jael
- Parent: Possibly Shamgar (according to Jewish tradition)

Sisera (Hebrew: סִיסְרָא, romanized: Sīsərāʾ) was commander of the Canaanite army of King Jabin of Hazor, who is mentioned in Judges 4–5 of the Hebrew Bible. After being defeated by the forces of the Israelite tribes of Zebulun and Naphtali under the command of Barak and Deborah, Sisera was killed by Jael, who hammered a tent peg into his temple while he slept.

The etymology of Sisera's name is unclear. Sisera's name has been variously identified as Philistine, Hittite, Hurrian, or Egyptian (Ses-Ra, "servant of Ra"). The Israeli scholar and archaeologist Adam Zertal identifies Sisera with the Sea People called Sherden, arguing that Sisera came from the island of Sardinia.

== Biblical account ==
According to the biblical book of Judges, Jabin, King of Hazor, oppressed the Israelites for twenty years. His general was Sisera, who commanded nine hundred iron chariots from Harosheth Haggoyim, a fortified cavalry base. After the prophetess Deborah persuaded Barak to face Sisera in battle, they, with an Israelite force of ten thousand, defeated him at the Battle of Mount Tabor at Jezreel Valley. Judges 5:20 says that "the stars in their courses fought against Sisera", and the following verse implies that the army was swept away by the Kishon River. Following the battle, there was peace for forty years.

After the battle, Sisera fled on foot until he came to the campsite of Heber the Kenite in the plain of Zaanaim, where he was received by Jael, Heber's wife. Jael brought him into her tent with apparent hospitality and gave him milk. Jael promised to hide Sisera and covered him with a rug, but after he fell asleep, she drove a tent peg through his temple with a mallet, her blow being so forceful that the peg pinned his head to the ground.

Later, during his farewell address, the prophet Samuel referred to the Israelites' subjection to Sisera as a consequence of their "forgetting the LORD their God".

== Archaeological information ==
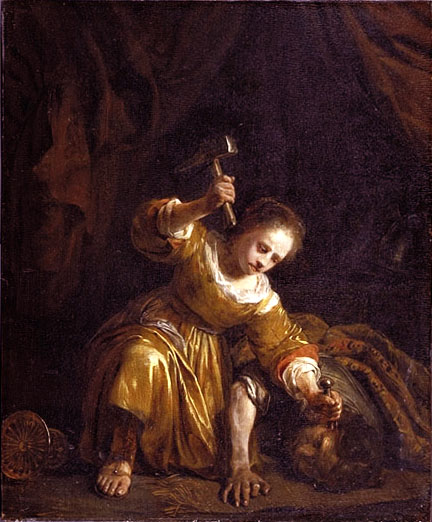
By Jan de Bray, 1659

The etymology of Sisera's name is unclear. Sisera's name has been variously identified as Philistine, Hittite, Hurrian, or Egyptian (Ses-Ra, "servant of Ra"). The Israeli scholar and archaeologist Adam Zertal identifies Sisera with the Sea People called Sherden, arguing that Sisera came from the island of Sardinia.

Zertal and Oren Cohen proposed that the excavation at Ahwat between Harish and the Wadi Ara is the site of Harosheth Haggoyim, Sisera's military base. However, consensus has not been reached regarding the site of Harosheth Haggoyim. Niditch suggests that its association with the term haroset might indicate its placement at any number of wooded places.

== Sisera in later Jewish tradition ==
The Jewish Encyclopedia reports that possibly his father was Shamgar. According to Jewish legend, because Sisera's mother cried a hundred cries when he did not return home, a hundred blasts are blown on the shofar on Rosh Hashana, the Jewish New Year. The Talmud states that the descendants of Sisera studied Torah in Jerusalem and even taught children there. A direct descendant of Sisera was Rabbi Akiva.

According to the Talmud, Jael engaged in sexual intercourse with Sisera seven times, but because she was attempting to exhaust him in order to kill him, her sin was for Heaven's sake and therefore praiseworthy. The significance of that exact number of coituses and the meaning of the multicoital nature of Jael and Sisera's encounter has been discussed in the scholarship, along with an alternate view in rabbinic literature that asserts to the contrary that Jael never engaged in sex with Sisera.

Also according to the Midrash, Sisera had previously conquered every country against which he had fought. His voice was so strong that, when he called loudly, the most solid wall would shake and the wildest animal would fall dead. Deborah was the only one who could withstand his voice and not be stirred from her place. Sisera caught enough fish in his beard when bathing in the Kishon to provision his whole army, and thirty-one kings followed Sisera merely for the opportunity of drinking, or otherwise using, the waters of Israel.

== Sisera in artistic works ==
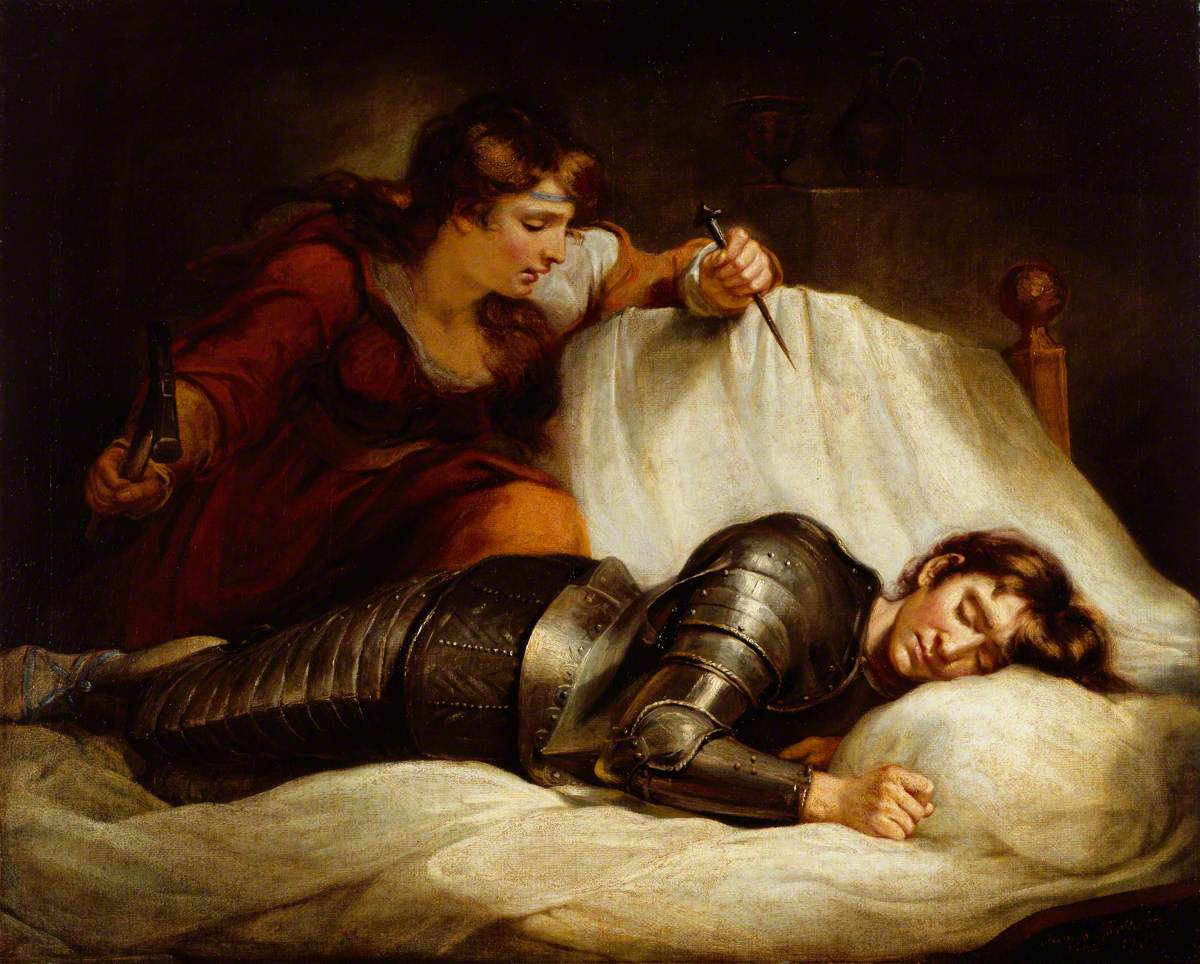
Jael and Sisera by James Northcote, 1787

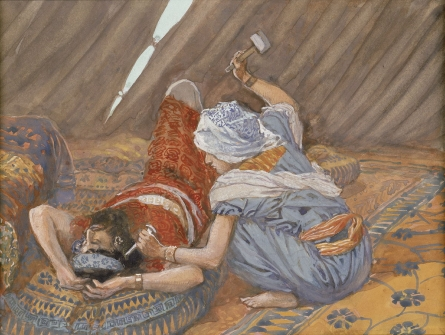
Jael Smote Sisera, and Slew Him, by James Tissot in the collection of the Jewish Museum (New York)

Sisera's murder by Jael was frequently depicted in historical European art. Lucas van Leyden, a Dutch engraver and painter during the Renaissance period, created a woodcut of the scene.

Pietro Alessandro Guglielmi (1728–1804) wrote an oratorio, Debora e Sisera, for the Lenten season of 1788 at the Teatro di San Carlo, Naples, which was said to have been "almost universally regarded as one of the most sublime works of the late 18th century."

German composer Simon Mayr wrote an oratorio (1793) on the story of Sisera for the church of San Lazzaro dei Mendicanti in Venice.

In Geoffrey Household's 1939 spy thriller Rogue Male, the protagonist muses: "Behold, Sisera lay dead and the nail was in his temples."

In a half-hour radio drama, Butter in a Lordly Dish (1948), Agatha Christie has her protagonist drug a lawyer's coffee; after revealing her true identity, she hammers a nail into his head.

The central image of Aritha van Herk's novel 'The Tent Peg' refers to Sisera.

In Anthony Trollope's novel The Last Chronicle of Barset, artist Conway Dalrymple paints the heiress Clara Van Siever as Jael driving a nail through the head of Sisera.

The story of Jael and Sisera has been the subject of many paintings, including those by Artemisia Gentileschi, Gregorio Lazzarini, James Northcote, Gustave Doré and James Tissot.

In Shelby Foote's Stars in Their Courses (1994), about the Battle of Gettysburg, the author reflects on the defeat of General Robert E. Lee.

"The Stars in Their Courses" is the title of a chapter about the Battle of Gettysburg in the novel Lone Star Preacher (1941) by John Thomason. The quotation from Judges 5:20 appears at the end of the chapter.

In the Law & Order episode "Pro Se", the schizophrenic James Smith suffers from the delusion that (among other things) he is General Sisera and various women are trying to poison him.

In Waking the Dead s4ep1 "In Sight of The Lord" a series of murders are committed with a large nail through the head fixing the victim to the floor. The biblical meaning of the act is explored in the process of solving the murders.

== See also ==
- Meroz
