= Barak =

Israelite military commander in the biblical Book of Judges

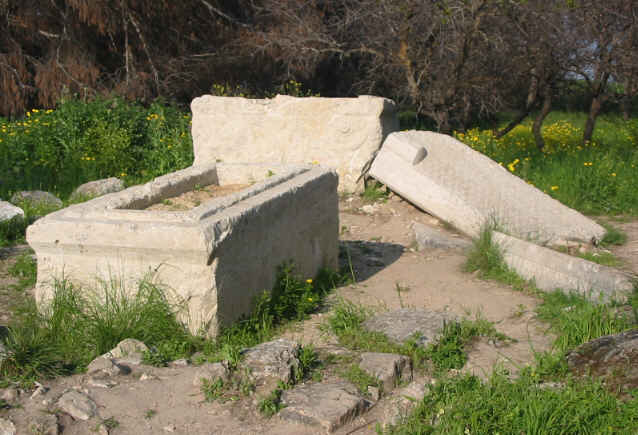
- Grave near Tel Kadesh attributed to Barak or Deborah
- Born: Kedesh, Naphtali
- Known for: Military commander who, with Deborah, defeated the Canaanite armies led by Sisera
- Title: Ruler of Ancient Israel
- Parent: Abinoam (father)

Barak (/ˈbɛəræk/ or /ˈbɛərək/; Hebrew: בָּרָק; Tiberian Hebrew: Bārāq; "lightning") was a ruler of Ancient Israel. As military commander in the biblical Book of Judges, Barak, with Deborah, from the Tribe of Ephraim, the prophet and fourth Judge of pre-monarchic Israel, defeated the Canaanite armies led by Sisera.

== Background ==
The son of Abinoam from Kedesh in Naphtali. His story is told in the Book of Judges, Chapters 4 and 5.

== Biblical story ==
The story of the Hebrews' defeat of the Canaanites led by Sisera, under the prophetic leadership of Deborah and the military leadership of Barak, is related in prose (Judges Chapter 4) and repeated in poetry (Chapter 5, which is known as the Song of Deborah).

Chapter 4 makes the chief enemy Jabin, king of Hazor (present Tell el-Qedah, about three miles southwest of Hula Basin), though a prominent part is played by his commander-in-chief, Sisera of Harosheth-ha-goiim (possibly Tell el-'Amr, approximately 12 miles (19 km) northwest of Megiddo).

Deborah summoned Barak, the son of Abinoam, from his home at Kedesh in Naphtali, and ordered him, in the name of God, to take ten thousand men to Mount Tabor. He agreed to on condition that Deborah should go with him. Here he was attacked, as Deborah had expected, by Sisera, whose forces were put to flight, and the greater part of them were slain by Barak's army.

Because Barak would not go to battle without Deborah, in turn she prophesied that the honor of victory would not go to him, but rather to a woman (Judges 4:9). Barak asked Deborah to go with him because of her connection with God. Some scholars see this as Barak being spineless while others might see Barak making a smart decision since Deborah was seen as a mediator between God and humans. Most authorities believe this passage refers to Jael's killing of Sisera in her tent following the battle, while others believe this refers to Deborah herself.

== Defeat and death of Sisera ==
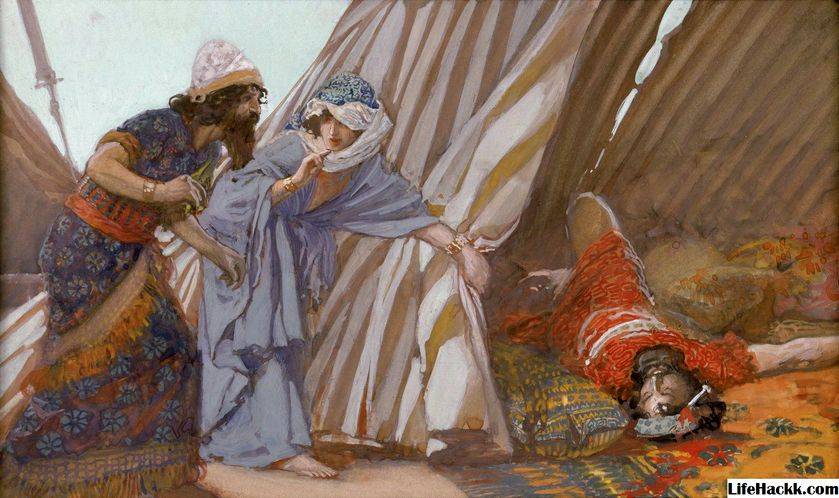
Jael shows the slain Sisera to Barak, by James Tissot.

In the battle at Mount Tabor, a cloudburst occurred, causing the river to flood, thus limiting the maneuverability of the Canaanite chariots. Sisera fled, seeking refuge in the tent of a Kenite woman, Jael. Jael gave a drink of milk to Sisera, who fell asleep from weariness, then killed him by pounding a tent peg through his head. When Barak arrived, she showed him Sisera, dead in her tent.

== Etymology ==
Barak ברק means lightning in Hebrew. Barcas, the surname of the famous Hamilcar Barca, is the Punic equivalent of the name.

== In the New Testament ==
The Epistle to the Hebrews 11:32-34 praises Barak's faith which gave him victory.

== In the Apocrypha ==
Barak is also made reference to in chapter 28 of 1 Meqabyan, a book considered canonical in the Ethiopian Orthodox Tewahedo Church. Barak is also used in the Ethiopian language of Amharic. Meaning " He who blesses."

Barak Tribe of Naphtali
Preceded by Shamgar	Judge of Israel	Succeeded by Gideon
