= Jabin =

Kings of Hazor mentioned in the Hebrew Bible

Jabin (Hebrew: יָבִין Yāḇīn) is a Biblical name meaning 'discerner', or 'the wise'. It may refer to:

- A king of Hazor at the time of the entrance of Israel into Canaan (Joshua 11:1 - 14), whose overthrow and that of the northern chiefs with whom he had entered into a confederacy against Joshua was the crowning act in the conquest of the land (Joshua 11:21 - 23; comp 14:6 - 15). The Battle of the Waters of Merom, fought at Lake Hula, was the last of Joshua's battles of which we have any record. Here for the first time the Israelites encountered the iron chariots and horses of the Canaanites. The Israelites killed him and everyone in his city along with all the people in the cities of Madon, Shimron, Achshaph, Debir, and Anab. They then destroyed Hazor by fire. According to Norman K. Gottwald, Joshua had nothing to do with the incident, which probably reflects a tradition of the late 13th century BCE destruction of Hazor by part of a group later identified with the Israelite tribe of Naphtali.
- Another king of Hazor, called "the king of Canaan," who overpowered the Israelites of the north one hundred and sixty years after Joshua's death, and for twenty years held them in painful subjection. The whole population were paralyzed with fear, and gave way to hopeless despondency (Judges 5:6 - 11), until Deborah and Barak aroused the national spirit, and gathering together ten thousand men, gained a great and decisive victory over Jabin in the plain of Esdraelon (Judges 4:10 - 16; compare Psalm 83 (Psalms 83:9)) This was the first great victory Israel had gained since the days of Joshua. For the next forty years, they never needed to fight another battle with the Canaanites (Judges 5:31).
