= Judges 4 =

Book of Judges, chapter 4

- ← chapter 3 chapter 5 →
- The pages containing the Book of Judges in Leningrad Codex (1008 CE).
- Book: Book of Judges
- Hebrew Bible part: Nevi'im
- Order in the Hebrew part: 2
- Category: Former Prophets
- Christian Bible part: Old Testament (Heptateuch)
- Order in the Christian part: 7

Judges 4 is the fourth chapter of the Book of Judges in the Old Testament or the Hebrew Bible. According to Jewish tradition the book was attributed to the prophet Samuel, but modern scholars view it as part of the Deuteronomistic History, which spans the books of Deuteronomy to 2 Kings, attributed to nationalistic and devotedly Yahwistic writers during the time of the reformer Judean king Josiah in 7th century BCE. This chapter records the activities of judge Deborah, belonging to a section comprising Judges 3:1 to 5:31.

== Text ==
This chapter was originally written in the Hebrew language. It is divided into 24 verses.

=== Textual witnesses ===
Some early manuscripts containing the text of this chapter in Hebrew are of the Masoretic Text tradition, which includes the Codex Cairensis (895), Aleppo Codex (10th century), and Codex Leningradensis (1008). Fragments containing parts of this chapter in Hebrew were found among the Dead Sea Scrolls including XJudges (XJudg, X6; 50 BCE) with extant verses 5–8.

Extant ancient manuscripts of a translation into Koine Greek known as the Septuagint (originally was made in the last few centuries BCE) include Codex Vaticanus (B; $\mathfrak{G}$^{B}; 4th century) and Codex Alexandrinus (A; $\mathfrak{G}$^{A}; 5th century). (Note: The whole book of Judges is missing from the extant Codex Sinaiticus.)

== Analysis ==
A linguistic study by Chisholm reveals that the central part in the Book of Judges (Judges 3:7–16:31) can be divided into two panels based on the six refrains that state that the Israelites did evil in Yahweh's eyes:

Panel One

A 3:7 ויעשו בני ישראל את הרע בעיני יהוה

And the children of Israel did evil in the sight of the LORD (KJV)
B 3:12 ויספו בני ישראל לעשות הרע בעיני יהוה

And the children of Israel did evil again in the sight of the LORD

B 4:1 ויספו בני ישראל לעשות הרע בעיני יהוה

And the children of Israel did evil again in the sight of the LORD

Panel Two

A 6:1 ויעשו בני ישראל הרע בעיני יהוה

And the children of Israel did evil in the sight of the LORD
B 10:6 ויספו בני ישראל לעשות הרע בעיני יהוה

And the children of Israel did evil again in the sight of the LORD

B 13:1 ויספו בני ישראל לעשות הרע בעיני יהוה

And the children of Israel did evil again in the sight of the LORD

Furthermore from the linguistic evidence, the verbs used to describe the Lord's response to Israel's sin have chiastic patterns and can be grouped to fit the division above:

Panel One

3:8 וימכרם, "and he sold them," from the root מָכַר, makar
3:12 ויחזק, "and he strengthened," from the root חָזַק, khazaq
4:2 וימכרם, "and he sold them," from the root מָכַר, makar

Panel Two

6:1 ויתנם, "and he gave them," from the root נָתַן, nathan
10:7 וימכרם, "and he sold them," from the root מָכַר, makar
13:1 ויתנם, "and he gave them," from the root נָתַן, nathan

== Deborah (4:1–16) ==
This chapter opens with the conventional narrative pattern of the book, connecting with Ehud without reference to Shamgar (who is later mentioned in Judges 5), to introduce Deborah the prophet as the savior (verse 4), after Israel's formulaic cry to God for relief from oppression.

Deborah delivered military instructions received directly from God to Barak, the apparent leader of the Israelites, to confront the army of Jabin, led by Sisera (his general), and thereby showing that YHWH is the ultimate military commander in the holy wars fought by his people.

The structure of the section from verses 6–16 is as follows:

A The command of Deborah and the response of Barak (4:6–9)

a. Deborah commands Barak to gather an army and assures him of victory (4:6–7)
b. Barak requires Deborah's presence (4:8)
c. Barak wins his request but loses glory (4:9)

B Barak deploys the troops (4:10)

a. Barak calls (z'q) the troops to Kedesh (4:10a^{1})
b. Barak goes up (ʼlh) with the troops (4:10a^{2}–b)

B' Sisera deploys the troops (4:12–13)

a. Sisera hears that Barak has gone up (ʼlh) (4:12)
b. Sisera calls (z'q) the troops to Wadi-Kishon (4:13)

A' The command of Deborah and the response of Barak (4:14–16)

a. Deborah commands Barak to go into battle and assures him of victory (4:14a)
b. Barak goes down to fight (4:14b)
c. Barak wins the battle but loses Sisera (4:15–16)

In verses 12-16, the pattern of Israel's redemption is completed with the underdogs' victory as prophesied by the prophetess.

=== Verse 4 ===
And Deborah, a prophetess, the wife of Lapidoth, she judged Israel at that time.

- "Prophetess": or "female prophet", like "Huldah" who relayed an important oracle about the need for reform in the time of king Josiah (2 Kings 22:14–20); "Noadiah" mentioned in Nehemiah 6:14; and the wife of Isaiah (Isaiah 8:3).
- "Wife of Lapidoth" in Hebrew can also be translated as 'woman of fire', or 'woman of torches/lightning flashes', in a parallel to "Barak" whose name means 'lightning'.

== Jael kills Sisera (4:17–24) ==
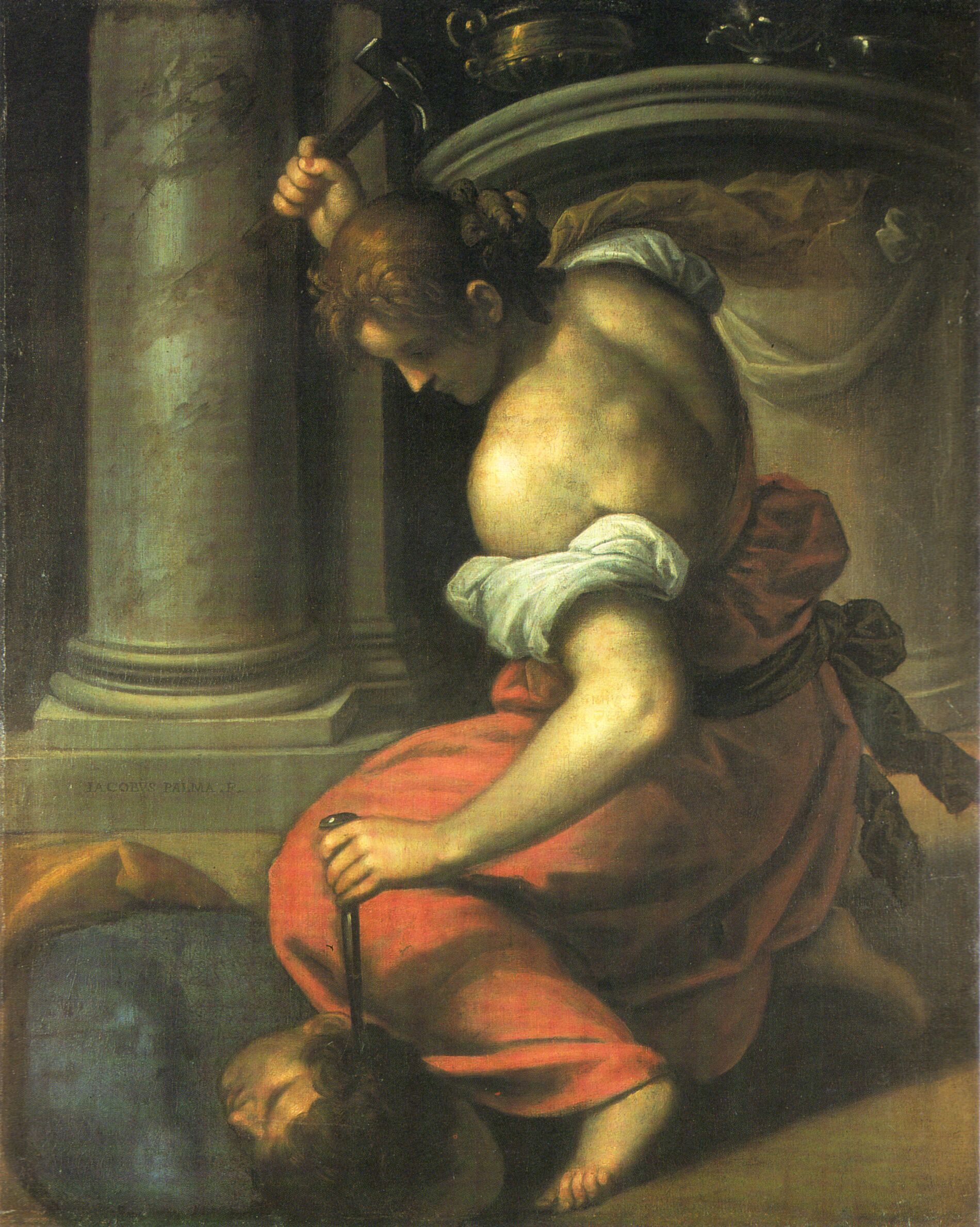
"Jael killed Sisera". Painting by Palam il Giovane (1550-1628)

The structure of this section is:

Sisera came to Jael's tent (4:17)

A Jael entreats Sisera to come into her tent (4:18a)

B Sisera enters asking for aid (4:18b–20)

C Jael kills Sisera (4:21)

Barak came to Jael's tent (4:22a^{1})

A' Jael entreats Barak to come into her tent (4:22a^{2})

B' Barak responds by entering (4:22b^{1})

C' Jael presents the slain Sisera to Barak (4:22b^{2})

In this section, Sisera was looking for a place to hide from Israelite pursuers and by chance came to Jael's tent. Jael intentionally went out to meet Sisera and tricked him into thinking that she could provide service (cf. Ehud to Eglon in Judges 3). Sisear asked for water, but Jael demonstrated ancient Near Eastern hospitality by instead giving him milk ("Jael" (Hebrew: יָעֵל Yāʿēl) means "mountain goat" ("ibex"); perhaps she gave Sisear goat's milk) and covering him up to sleep, whereupon Jael struck him dead with a tent-peg and hammer. The action was sung with some detail and nuance in the ancient poem of Judges 5 verse 22, as the fulfilment of Deborah's prediction (4:9).

The last two verses (23–24) contain a reminder that YHWH controls the battle and gives relief from Israel's oppressors.

=== Verse 20 ===
And he said to her, "Stand at the door of the tent, and if any man comes and inquires of you, and says, 'Is there any man here?' you shall say, 'No.' "

The last words of Sisera to Jael (before Sisera was killed by Jael) contain an irony, with the play of the word "any man" (Hebrew ʼiš): the first use refers to the one coming to the tent, which was Barak, whereas the second use refers to the one in the tent, which was Sisera, and the answer should be "No", because Sisera would no longer be alive by the time Barak came.

== Archaeology ==
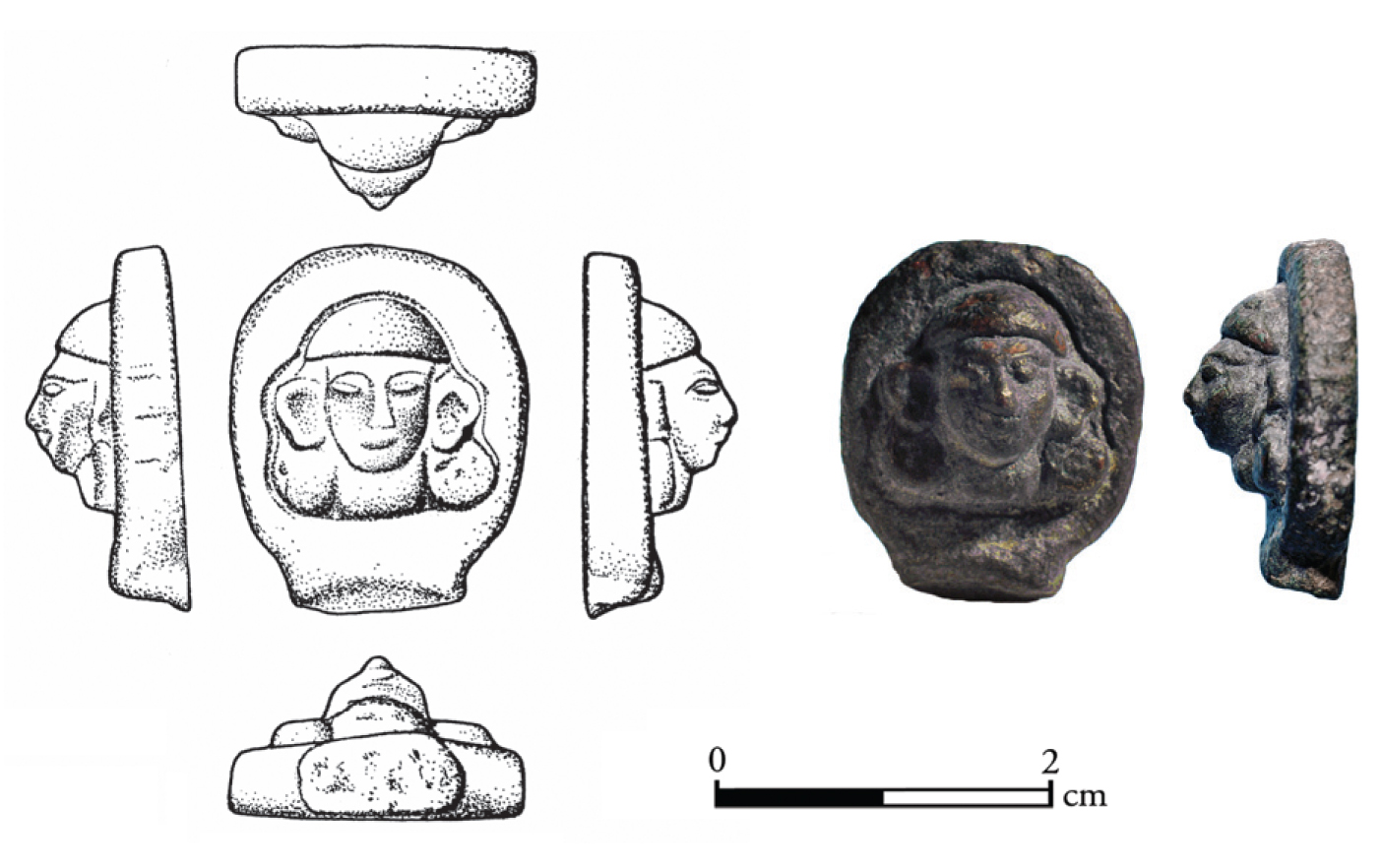
A chariot linchpin found El-Ahwat which supports the identification of the site as Harosheth Haggoyim.

- Adam Zertal has suggested that Harosheth Haggoyim, the fortress or cavalry base of Sisera, commander of the army of King Jabin, may be El-Ahwat, between Katzir-Harish and Nahal Iron, on the basis of the finding of a fancy chariot linchpin by archaeologist Oren Cohen. The excavation of the site from 1993-2000 by teams from the University of Haifa and the University of Cagliari in Sardinia revealed a fortified place dating to the Late Bronze Age and early Iron Age (13th-12th centuries BCE) with a unique style of fortifications, walls, passageways in the walls and rounded huts pointing to the occupation by the Shardana, one of the Sea Peoples who invaded the Levant in the Late Bronze Age.

== See also ==
- Abinoam
- Allon Bachuth
- Assassination
- Canaan
- Chariot
- Children of Israel
- Goy
- Hazor
- Heber
- Hobab
- Iron
- Kedeshnaphtali
- Kenite
- Kishon River
- Milk
- Mount Ephraim
- Mount Tabor
- Zaanaim
- Related Bible parts: Judges 3, Judges 5

== Sources ==
- Chisholm, Robert B. Jr. (2009). "The Chronology of the Book of Judges: A Linguistic Clue to Solving a Pesky Problem" (PDF). Journal of the Evangelical Theological Society. 52 (2): 247–55. Archived from the original (PDF) on 2022-11-08.
- Coogan, Michael David (2007). Coogan, Michael David; Brettler, Marc Zvi; Newsom, Carol Ann; Perkins, Pheme (eds.). The New Oxford Annotated Bible with the Apocryphal/Deuterocanonical Books: New Revised Standard Version, Issue 48 (Augmented 3rd ed.). Oxford University Press. ISBN 978-0-19-528881-0.
- Fitzmyer, Joseph A. (2008). A Guide to the Dead Sea Scrolls and Related Literature. Grand Rapids, MI: William B. Eerdmans Publishing Company. ISBN 978-0-8028-6241-9.
- Halley, Henry H. (1965). Halley's Bible Handbook: an abbreviated Bible commentary (24th (revised) ed.). Zondervan Publishing House. ISBN 0-310-25720-4.
- Hayes, Christine (2015). Introduction to the Bible. Yale University Press. ISBN 978-0-300-18827-1.
- Niditch, Susan (2007). "10. Judges". In Barton, John; Muddiman, John (eds.). The Oxford Bible Commentary (first (paperback) ed.). Oxford University Press. pp. 176–191. ISBN 978-0-19-927718-6.
- Ulrich, Eugene, ed. (2010). The Biblical Qumran Scrolls: Transcriptions and Textual Variants. Brill.
- Webb, Barry G. (2012). The Book of Judges. New International Commentary on the Old Testament. Eerdmans Publishing Company. ISBN 978-0-8028-2628-2.
- Würthwein, Ernst (1995). The Text of the Old Testament. Translated by Rhodes, Erroll F. Grand Rapids, MI: Wm. B. Eerdmans. ISBN 0-8028-0788-7.
- Younger, K. Lawson (2002). Judges and Ruth. The NIV Application Commentary. Zondervan. ISBN 978-0-310-20636-1.
