= Judges 5 =

Book of Judges, chapter 5

- ← chapter 4 chapter 6 →
- The pages containing the Book of Judges in Leningrad Codex (1008 CE).
- Book: Book of Judges
- Hebrew Bible part: Nevi'im
- Order in the Hebrew part: 2
- Category: Former Prophets
- Christian Bible part: Old Testament (Heptateuch)
- Order in the Christian part: 7

Judges 5 is the fifth chapter of the Book of Judges in the Old Testament and the Hebrew Bible. According to Jewish tradition, the book was attributed to the Hebrew prophet Samuel, but modern scholars view it as part of the Deuteronomistic history, which spans the Book of Deuteronomy through the Books of Kings, attributed to nationalistic and devotedly Yahwistic writers during the time of the reformist Judean king Josiah in the 7th century BCE. This chapter records the activities of judge Deborah, belonging to a section comprising Judges 3:1 to 5:31.

== Text ==
This chapter was originally written in the Hebrew language. It is divided into 31 verses.

=== Textual witnesses ===
Some early manuscripts containing the text of this chapter in Hebrew are of the Masoretic Text tradition, which includes the Codex Cairensis (895), Aleppo Codex (10th century), and Codex Leningradensis (1008).

Extant ancient manuscripts of a translation into Koine Greek known as the Septuagint (originally was made in the last few centuries BCE) include Codex Vaticanus (B; $\mathfrak{G}$^{B}; 4th century) and Codex Alexandrinus (A; $\mathfrak{G}$^{A}; 5th century). (Note: The whole book of Judges is missing from the extant Codex Sinaiticus.)

== Analysis ==
A linguistic study by Chisholm reveals that the central part in the Book of Judges (Judges 3:7–16:31) can be divided into two panels based on the six refrains that state that the Israelites did evil in Yahweh's eyes:

Panel One

A 3:7 ויעשו בני ישראל את הרע בעיני יהוה

And the children of Israel did evil in the sight of the LORD (KJV)
B 3:12 ויספו בני ישראל לעשות הרע בעיני יהוה

And the children of Israel did evil again in the sight of the LORD

B 4:1 ויספו בני ישראל לעשות הרע בעיני יהוה

And the children of Israel did evil again in the sight of the LORD

Panel Two

A 6:1 ויעשו בני ישראל הרע בעיני יהוה

And the children of Israel did evil in the sight of the LORD
B 10:6 ויספו בני ישראל לעשות הרע בעיני יהוה

And the children of Israel did evil again in the sight of the LORD

B 13:1 ויספו בני ישראל לעשות הרע בעיני יהוה

And the children of Israel did evil again in the sight of the LORD

Furthermore from the linguistic evidence, the verbs used to describe the Lord's response to Israel's sin have chiastic patterns and can be grouped to fit the division above:

Panel One

3:8 וימכרם, "and he sold them," from the root מָכַר, makar
3:12 ויחזק, "and he strengthened," from the root חָזַק, khazaq
4:2 וימכרם, "and he sold them," from the root מָכַר, makar

Panel Two

6:1 ויתנם, "and he gave them," from the root נָתַן, nathan
10:7 וימכרם, "and he sold them," from the root מָכַר, makar
13:1 ויתנם, "and he gave them," from the root נָתַן, nathan

The victory song attributed to Deborah in this chapter is one of the oldest extant Israelite literary compositions dating to around the 12th century BCE, roughly contemporaneous with the period of time it depicts. Comparable to earlier works of the Canaanites discovered at Ugarit, the composition is characterized by a 'parallelistic variety of repetition whereby imagery unfolds in a beautifully layered or impressionistic style' so that 'the parallel line adds colour, nuance, or contrast to its neighbouring description'. The lines (in bicola or tricola) are generally about parallel in length. The content itself draws upon traditional Israelite media of expression, also employed by others in the biblical tradition.

== Title (5:1) ==
Then sang Deborah and Barak the son of Abinoam on that day, saying,

- "Sang": The Hebrew verb is in the form of singular feminine to indicate that the following ode was the composition of Deborah the prophetess, and was sung by her, assisted by Barak, who perhaps sang the antistrophe parts (cf. Exodus 15:1, 21), in alternate verses, answering each other, because there are parts which Deborah could not sing (as it is about her), as well as parts which Barak could not sing (as it is about him). In the Hebrew Bible, this hymn, like the songs of Moses (Exodus 15; Deuteronomy 32), is distinguished in the writing format as being poetry. In the Israelite tradition a 'victory song' like this is a genre frequently associated with women composers.

== Song of Deborah (5:2–31) ==
The structure of the Song of Deborah is as follows:

Content	Verse(s)	Stanza
A. Prelude to the song (1) Preliminary ascriptions of praise to Yahweh for what is about to be recounted	2	IA
(2) A call to hear the song	3	IA
B. The coming of Yahweh the divine warrior	4–5	IA
C. Conditions prevailing before the battle	6–8	IB
D. A call to participate in the battle	9–13	II
E. The response of the tribes	14–18	III
F. The battle itself	19–23	IV
G. The death of Sisera	24–27	VA
H. His mother waits in vain	28–30	VB
I. Concluding invocation of Yahweh	31a	

The call to hear this song contains parallel terms and syntax with the formulaic introduction 'hear/give ear' (cf Deuteronomy 32:1; Isaiah 1:2), to state that YHWH, both the muse and victor, is the ultimate source and receiver of the song.

Verses 24–27 present another version of the tale of Jael in wonderfully economic style, with the repetition that underscores the violent turn in the action as Jael is described as one who strikes, crushes, shatters, and pierces, as she at the same time seduced and slaughtered the enemy. In contrast to Jael as a tent-dwelling woman, the mother of Sisera is a noblewomen peering from a house with lattice-work windows (cf. 2 Kings 10:30), accompanied by ladies-in-waiting, but instead of expecting the coming of Sisera with the spoils of war, it was Sisera himself who has been despoiled at the hands of a warrior woman.

=== Verse 6 ===
In the days of Shamgar the son of Anath, in the days of Jael, the highways were unoccupied, and the travellers walked through byways.

- "Shamgar": a judge who succeeded Ehud (Judges 3:31), but perhaps did not live long. During his time until 'now' (in the day of Jael), under Jabin's oppression, things were as described in this verse.
- "The highways were unoccupied": literally, "kept holiday", such as stated in Leviticus 26:22, that the grass grew on them; there was no one to occupy them or as in other parts of the Hebrew Bible: "the highways lie waste, the wayfaring man ceaseth" (Isaiah 33:8), "the land was desolate after them, that no man passed through nor returned" (Zechariah 7:14; cf. 2 Chronicles 15:5; Lamentations 1:4; Lamentations 4:18).

=== Verse 31 ===
"Thus let all Your enemies perish, O LORD! But let those who love Him be like the sun When it comes out in full strength."
So the land had rest for forty years.

The abrupt burst by which the song ends depicts the completeness of the overthrow, causing it to be long remembered as an example of Israel's triumph over God's enemies (Psalm 83:9–10; Psalm 83:12–15).

- "So the land had rest": This statement is not a part of the song, but concludes the whole story (cf. Judges 3:11; Judges 3:30; Judges 8:28). The account is the last of any attempt by the Canaanites to re-conquer the land they had lost.

== See also ==
- Amalek
- Anat, a spear-wielding Egyptian war goddess
- Angel of the Lord
- Children of Israel
- Gilead
- Heber
- Kenite
- Machir
- Twelve Tribes of Israel
- Related Bible parts: Judges 3, Judges 4

== Sources ==
- Chisholm, Robert B. Jr. (2009). "The Chronology of the Book of Judges: A Linguistic Clue to Solving a Pesky Problem" (PDF). Journal of the Evangelical Theological Society. 52 (2): 247–55. Archived from the original (PDF) on 2022-11-08.
- Coogan, Michael David (2007). Coogan, Michael David; Brettler, Marc Zvi; Newsom, Carol Ann; Perkins, Pheme (eds.). The New Oxford Annotated Bible with the Apocryphal/Deuterocanonical Books: New Revised Standard Version, Issue 48 (Augmented 3rd ed.). Oxford University Press. ISBN 978-0-19-528881-0.
- Halley, Henry H. (1965). Halley's Bible Handbook: an abbreviated Bible commentary (24th (revised) ed.). Zondervan Publishing House. ISBN 0-310-25720-4.
- Hayes, Christine (2015). Introduction to the Bible. Yale University Press. ISBN 978-0-300-18827-1.
- Niditch, Susan (2007). "10. Judges". In Barton, John; Muddiman, John (eds.). The Oxford Bible Commentary (first (paperback) ed.). Oxford University Press. pp. 176–191. ISBN 978-0-19-927718-6.
- Webb, Barry G. (2012). The Book of Judges. New International Commentary on the Old Testament. Eerdmans Publishing Company. ISBN 978-0-8028-2628-2.
- Würthwein, Ernst (1995). The Text of the Old Testament. Translated by Rhodes, Erroll F. Grand Rapids, MI: Wm. B. Eerdmans. ISBN 0-8028-0788-7.
- Younger, K. Lawson (2002). Judges and Ruth. The NIV Application Commentary. Zondervan. ISBN 978-0-310-20636-1.
