= Khirbat al-Nushaynish =

Archaeological site in Jordan

Khirbet al-Nushaynish
- Kh. en-Nsheinish
- Location within Jordan
- 31°05′16.0″N 35°45′34.4″E
- Type: settlement
- Periods: Early Bronze Age, Late Bronze Age, Hellenistic, Nabataean, Early Roman, Byzantine, Umayyad, Fatimid, Ayyubid/Mamluk, Late Islamic
- Cultures: Nabataean, Byzantine-era Christian culture
- Location: Karak Governorate, Jordan
- Region: Karak plateau, Moab

Site notes
- Archaeologists: Nelson Glueck, J. Maxwell Miller, Karen A. Borstad and Jehad Haroun
- Condition: In ruins

Khirbet al-Nushaynish or Kh. en-Nsheinish is an archaeological site located in south-central Jordan.

== Geography ==
The site is located in the historical region of Moab, southern Jordan, approximately 6 kilometers east of Mu'tah and 6.5 kilometers east/northeast of Al-Mazar. The site sits atop a ridge running roughly north to south, overlooking valleys on both sides.

== Archaeology ==
Khirbat al-Nushaynish features the remains of houses, walls, caves and cisterns, as well as what may have been a public structure. A survey at the site, conducted by J. Maxwell Miller, uncovered pottery from the early and late Bronze Ages, Hellenistic, Nabataean, Early Roman, Byzantine, Umayyad, Fatimid, Ayyubid/Mamluk, and Late Islamic periods. The largest portion of the assemblage comes from the Late Islamic period, followed by the Nabataean and Ayyubid/Mamluk eras.

In 1934, archaeologist Nelson Glueck described it as "a small Nabataean site with a complex of ruined houses, foundation walls, and a few large cisterns. The sherds found there were almost all Nabataean, but there were a number of early Arabic sherds also." Later, in 2010, Karen A. Borstad and Jehad Haroun referred to it as "a large Nabataean village."

In 2016, the first inscribed tombstone was discovered at the site. The tombstone is rectangular, carved from local limestone, and bears a Christian epitaph belonging to the Byzantine period. The inscription, written in Greek, commemorates "Euboulos son of A…", who lived six years and died in the provincial year 472 of Roman Arabia, corresponding to 22 March 577–21 March 578 AD.

== See also ==
- Al-Karak
- Muhay

== Bibliography ==
- Aliquot, Julien; al-Shdaifat, Younis (2020-01-02). "Greek Christian epitaphs from Charakmoba and the Land of Moab". Palestine Exploration Quarterly. 152 (1): 3–26. doi:10.1080/00310328.2020.1712834. ISSN 0031-0328.
- Borstad, K. A.; Haroun, J. (2010). "A new Roman road site on al-Karak Plateau" (PDF). Annual of the Department of Antiquities of Jordan. 54: 483–491.
- Miller, J. M. (1991). Archaeological Survey of the Kerak Plateau: Conducted during 1978–1982 under the Direction of J. Maxwell Miller and Jack M. Pinkerton. Atlanta, GA: Scholars Press.
