= Judges 3 =

Book of Judges, chapter 3

- ← chapter 2 chapter 4 →
- The pages containing the Book of Judges in Leningrad Codex (1008 CE).
- Book: Book of Judges
- Hebrew Bible part: Nevi'im
- Order in the Hebrew part: 2
- Category: Former Prophets
- Christian Bible part: Old Testament (Heptateuch)
- Order in the Christian part: 7

Judges 3 is the third chapter of the Book of Judges in the Old Testament or the Hebrew Bible. According to Jewish tradition the book was attributed to the prophet Samuel, but modern scholars view it as part of the Deuteronomistic History, which spans the books of Deuteronomy to 2 Kings, attributed to nationalistic and devotedly Yahwistic writers during the time of the reformer Judean king Josiah in 7th century BCE. This chapter records the activities of the first three judges, Othniel, Ehud, and Shamgar, belonging to a section comprising Judges 3:1 to 5:31.

== Text ==
This chapter was originally written in the Hebrew language. It is divided into 31 verses.

=== Textual witnesses ===
Some early manuscripts containing the text of this chapter in Hebrew are of the Masoretic Text tradition, which includes the Codex Cairensis (895), Aleppo Codex (10th century), and Codex Leningradensis (1008). Fragments containing parts of this chapter in Hebrew were found among the Dead Sea Scrolls including XJudges (XJudg, X6; 50 BCE) with extant verses 23–24.

Extant ancient manuscripts of a translation into Koine Greek known as the Septuagint (originally was made in the last few centuries BCE) include Codex Vaticanus (B; $\mathfrak{G}$^{B}; 4th century) and Codex Alexandrinus (A; $\mathfrak{G}$^{A}; 5th century). (Note: The whole book of Judges is missing from the extant Codex Sinaiticus.)

== Analysis ==
A linguistic study by Chisholm reveals that the central part in the Book of Judges (Judges 3:7–16:31) can be divided into two panels based on the six refrains that state that the Israelites did evil in Yahweh's eyes:

Panel One
A 3:7 ויעשו בני ישראל את הרע בעיני יהוה

And the children of Israel did evil in the sight of the LORD (KJV)

B 3:12 ויספו בני ישראל לעשות הרע בעיני יהוה

And the children of Israel did evil again in the sight of the LORD

B 4:1 ויספו בני ישראל לעשות הרע בעיני יהוה

And the children of Israel did evil again in the sight of the LORD

Panel Two
A 6:1 ויעשו בני ישראל הרע בעיני יהוה

And the children of Israel did evil in the sight of the LORD

B 10:6 ויספו בני ישראל לעשות הרע בעיני יהוה

And the children of Israel did evil again in the sight of the LORD

B 13:1 ויספו בני ישראל לעשות הרע בעיני יהוה

And the children of Israel did evil again in the sight of the LORD

Furthermore from the linguistic evidence, the verbs used to describe the Lord's response to Israel's sin have chiastic patterns and can be grouped to fit the division above:

Panel One
3:8 וימכרם, "and he sold them", from the root מָכַר, makar
3:12 ויחזק, "and he strengthened", from the root חָזַק, khazaq
4:2 וימכרם, "and he sold them", from the root מָכַר, makar

Panel Two
6:1 ויתנם, "and he gave them", from the root נָתַן, nathan
10:7 וימכרם, "and he sold them", from the root מָכַר, makar
13:1 ויתנם, "and he gave them", from the root נָתַן, nathan

== Nations left to test Israel (verses 1–6) ==
The introductory section of the chapter lists by name and place the Canaanite nations that the Israelites had to drive out of the land (verse 1–4) with an additional text that the nations' continued presence in the land was allowed by YHWH so the Israelites as newcomers to the land could sharpen their agonistic skills and capacity to resist idols against some idolatrous enemies (verse 4; Judges 2:22).

=== Verse 1 ===
Now these are the nations which the LORD left, to prove Israel by them, even as many of Israel as had not known all the wars of Canaan;

"To prove": the verb is the same as in Judges 2:22 and Judges 3:4, but here it is used in the meaning "to train (them)", rendered by Symmachus in Greek as askēsai. This is directed to many Israelites who 'had not known all the wars of Canaan', implying the "generation after that of Joshua", to prepare them in the struggles of the actual conquest.

== Othniel (verses 7–11) ==
The report concerning the first judge, Othniel, is related to Judges 1:11-15, but here is using a conventionalized pattern (cf. Judges 2:11–31) with a formulaic language. Othniel had the empowerment of 'the spirit of the Lord' (verse 10) to defeat the enemies of Israel and to have the land rest for forty years.

=== Verse 8 ===
Therefore the anger of the LORD was hot against Israel, and he sold them into the hand of Chushanrishathaim king of Mesopotamia: and the children of Israel served Chushanrishathaim eight years.

- "Cushan-rishathaim" literally, "dark, double wicked", could be a pejorative created from his real name; it rhymes with "Aram-Naharaim", the Hebrew word for "Mesopotamia", meaning "Aram of the Two Rivers".

=== Verse 9 ===
And when the children of Israel cried unto the LORD, the LORD raised up a deliverer to the children of Israel, who delivered them, even Othniel the son of Kenaz, Caleb's younger brother.

- "Caleb's younger brother": In Judges 1:13, Joshua 15:17, and 1 Chronicles 4:13, Othniel is placed under "the sons of Kenaz," and likely the father of Hathath and Meonothai (Judith 6:15 mentioned his descendant, Chabris, living in the time of Holofernes). The Hebrew grammar could mean that Othniel was the brother of Caleb or that Kenaz, Othniel's father, was the brother of Caleb, thus Othniel was Caleb's nephew, which is more likely since Othniel married Caleb's daughter.

== Ehud (verses 12–30) ==
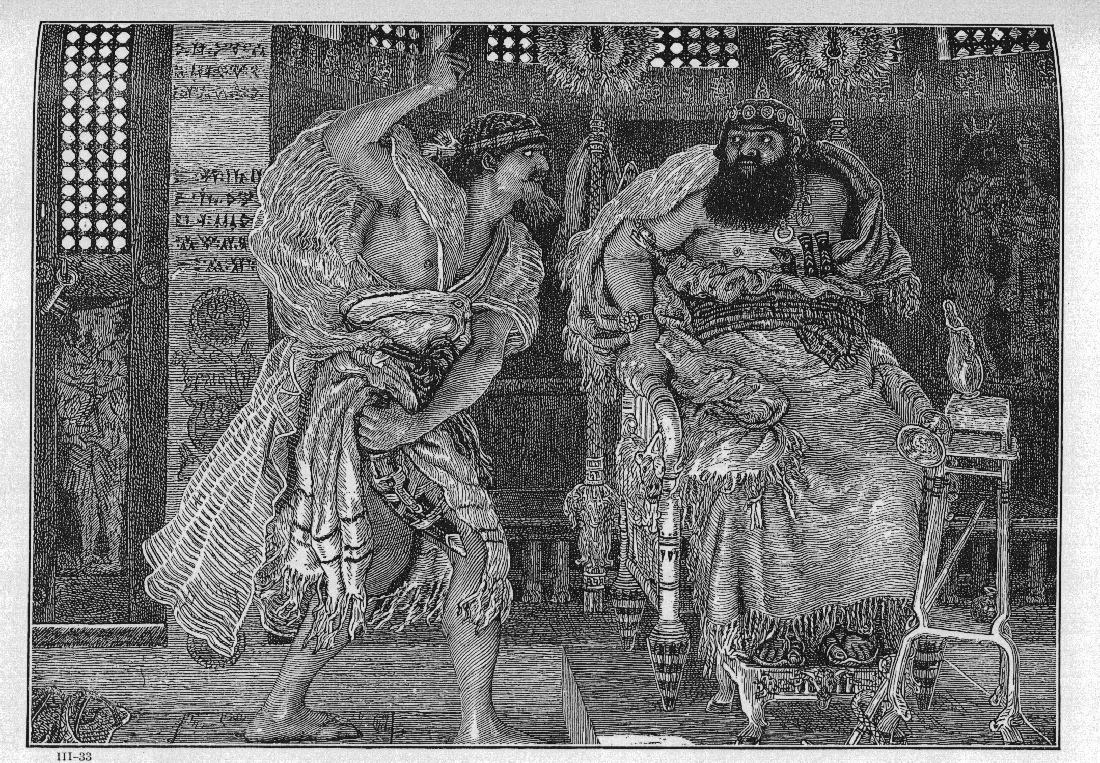
"Ehud assassinating the Moabite king Eglon". Illustration by Ford Madox Brown.

The second judge, a trickster-hero Ehud, succeeded through deception and disguise, "a marginal person who uses his wits to alter his status at the expense of those holding power over him". The ruse was made possible by Ehud's left-handedness, using a Hebrew term which is literally 'bound' or 'impaired with regard to the right hand', indicating an unusual or marginal status as the right being the preferred side in other biblical contexts (cf. Exodus 29:20, 22; Leviticus 7:32; 8:23, 25; Ecclesiastes 10:2). Judges 20 contains a note that the Benjaminites, Ehud's fellow-tribesmen, were in the tradition predisposed to left-handedness (cf. 20:16), a trait that makes them especially effective warriors to surprise the enemy and more difficult to defend against. The typical right-handed man would be expected to wear his sword on the left in order to draw with the right hand, thus Ehud could hide his weapon on the opposite side without raising suspicion. The story has word play with images of ritual sacrifice: the 'tribute' to Eglon as the king of Moab is in the term for sacrificial offering, while Eglon's name plays on the term for 'calf', so he became the 'fatted calf who will be slaughtered'. The phrase translated 'relieving himself' in NRSV literally in Hebrew reads 'pouring out' or 'covering his feet' ('the feet' is a biblical euphemism for the male member), so it could mean urinating or defecating, in any event, indicating Eglon's vulnerability and unmanning (cf. Saul in the cave; 1 Samuel 24:1–7).

== Shamgar (verse 31) ==
And after him was Shamgar the son of Anath, which slew of the Philistines six hundred men with an ox goad: and he also delivered Israel.

The reference to Shamgar, the third judge and liberator of Israel, is brief, lacking the conventional frame in content and language. Similar to Samson, Shamgar was superhumanly able to conquer hundreds of the Philistines with a mere ox-goad, a sign of the agrarian roots of the Israelite at this period of time, a national identity that dominated the book of Judges. The name "Anath" may also refer to a place or the Canaanite goddess Anath, the patroness of warriors.

- Cross reference: Judges 5:6
- "The Philistines": the fight against Philistines would continue in Judges 15:14–17 to 2 Samuel 23:8–23.

== See also ==
- Amalekite
- Amorites
- Assassination
- Baalim
- Canaanites
- Children of Ammon
- Children of Israel
- Cubit
- Dagger
- Ford
- Gera
- Gift
- Gilgal
- Goad
- Hamath
- Hittites
- Hivites
- Idolatry
- Jebusites
- Jordan River
- Mitzvah
- Moab
- Moses
- Mount Baalhermon
- Mount Ephraim
- Mount Lebanon
- Obesity
- Perizzites
- Philistines
- Quarry
- Sidonian
- Spirit of YHWH
- Tribe of Benjamin
- Related Bible parts: Joshua 13, Joshua 24, Judges 1, Judges 2

== Sources ==
- Chisholm, Robert B. Jr. (2009). "The Chronology of the Book of Judges: A Linguistic Clue to Solving a Pesky Problem" (PDF). Journal of the Evangelical Theological Society. 52 (2): 247–55. Archived from the original (PDF) on 2022-11-08.
- Coogan, Michael David (2007). Coogan, Michael David; Brettler, Marc Zvi; Newsom, Carol Ann; Perkins, Pheme (eds.). The New Oxford Annotated Bible with the Apocryphal/Deuterocanonical Books: New Revised Standard Version, Issue 48 (Augmented 3rd ed.). Oxford University Press. ISBN 978-0-19-528881-0.
- Fitzmyer, Joseph A. (2008). A Guide to the Dead Sea Scrolls and Related Literature. Grand Rapids, MI: William B. Eerdmans Publishing Company. ISBN 978-0-8028-6241-9.
- Halley, Henry H. (1965). Halley's Bible Handbook: an abbreviated Bible commentary (24th (revised) ed.). Zondervan Publishing House. ISBN 0-310-25720-4.
- Hayes, Christine (2015). Introduction to the Bible. Yale University Press. ISBN 978-0-300-18827-1.
- Niditch, Susan (2007). "10. Judges". In Barton, John; Muddiman, John (eds.). The Oxford Bible Commentary (first (paperback) ed.). Oxford University Press. pp. 176–191. ISBN 978-0-19-927718-6.
- Ulrich, Eugene, ed. (2010). The Biblical Qumran Scrolls: Transcriptions and Textual Variants. Brill.
- Würthwein, Ernst (1995). The Text of the Old Testament. Translated by Rhodes, Erroll F. Grand Rapids, MI: Wm. B. Eerdmans. ISBN 0-8028-0788-7.
