= Ehud =

Israelite described in the biblical Book of Judges

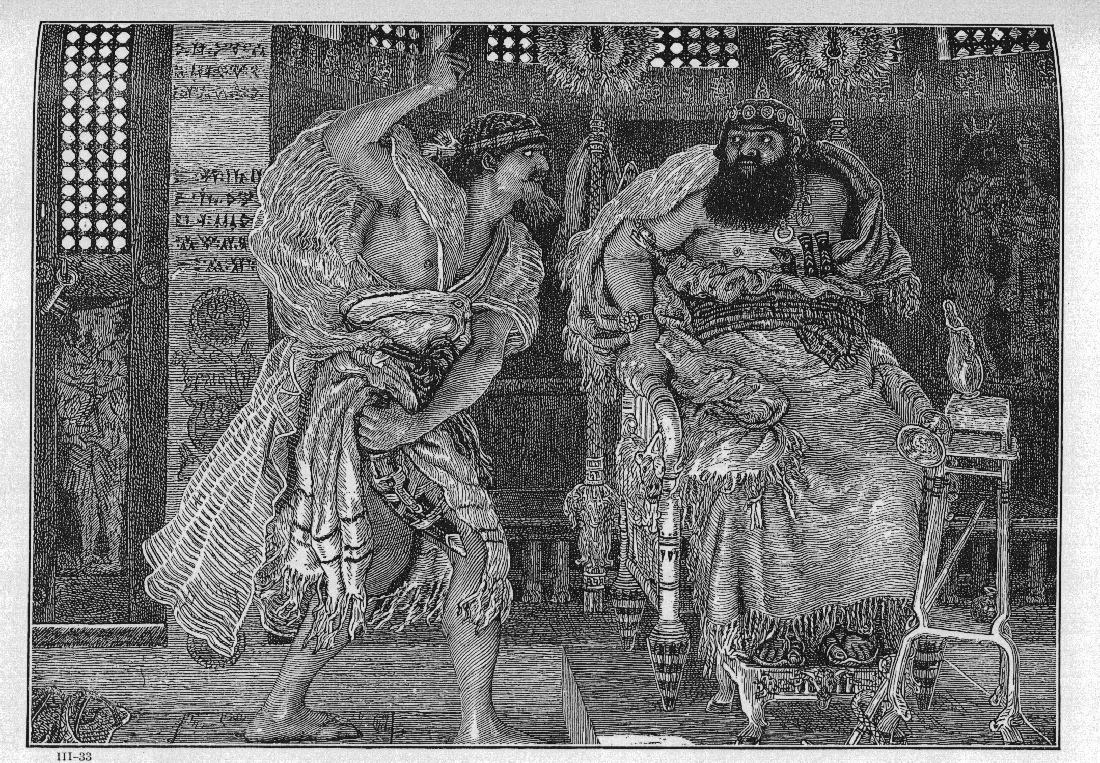
- Illustration by Ford Madox Brown of Ehud assassinating the Moabite king Eglon
- Occupation: Second Judge of Israel
- Predecessor: Othniel
- Successor: Deborah (or possibly Shamgar)

Ehud ben‑Gera (/ɛˈhuːd/; Hebrew: אֵהוּד בֶּן־גֵּרָא, Tiberian ʾĒhūḏ ben‑Gērāʾ) is described in the biblical Book of Judges chapter 3 as a judge who was sent by God to deliver the Israelites from Moabite domination. He is described as being left-handed and a member of the Tribe of Benjamin.

== Biblical narrative ==
According to Judges 3:12–30, Ehud was sent by the Israelites to the Moabite King Eglon on the pretext of delivering the Israelites' annual tribute. He made a double-edged shortsword about a cubit (eighteen inches) long, useful for a stabbing thrust. Being left-handed, he could conceal the sword on his right thigh, where it was not expected. Left handedness is significant because the left side of the body is often associated with deception or darkness, it is a tactical advantage in war against the majority who are often right-handed, and is symbolic for being outside of the culturally accepted social norm of leadership in ancient Israel. Once they met, Ehud told Eglon he had a secret message for him. Eglon dismissed his attendants and allowed Ehud to meet him in private. The Hebrew for the location of the private meeting is בַּעֲלִיַּת הַמְּקֵרָה ba-ʿăliyat ha-məqērāh, translated as cooling roof chamber, which was likely a bathroom given that the servants believed Eglon was relieving himself (v24). Ehud said, "I have a message from God for you", drew his sword, and stabbed the king in his abdomen. The Hebrew word for abdomen בְּבִטְנֽוֹ (beten), is the same word that is used for the womb of a woman. After Ehud stabbed the king, the end of Judges 3:22 reads in Hebrew וַיֵּצֵא הַֽפַּרְשְׁדֹֽנָה wa-yēṣē ha-paršədōnāh usually translated as "and the dirt came out", a phrase of uncertain meaning as it is only used once in the Hebrew Bible. "Dirt" could be translated as feces. The translations of the room, abdomen, and dirt lend to a translation that implies sexual undertones and feminizes Eglon, demeaning him to a lower status. (Note: The word may be an architectural term, indicating the area into which Ehud moved as he left the king and began his escape. Some take the noun as "back", and understand "sword" (from the preceding clause) as the subject, and translate "the sword came out [of] his back". The American Standard Version says "it [the sword] came out behind" and also provides the variant, "he went out into the antechamber" (ASV version of Judges 3:22). The Cambridge Bible for Schools and Colleges regards this wording as "based upon a guess of the Septuagint (τὴν προστάδα)", whose writers may, according to Ellicott, have been "consulting propriety", whereas many translations refer to excrement coming out of the body. The King James Version uses the euphemism of "dirt". Young's Literal Translation, more cryptically, states that "it goeth out at the fundament".) The sword disappeared into the wound and Ehud left it there. He locked the doors to the king's chamber and left.

Eglon's assistants returned when too much time had elapsed and found the doors locked. Assuming that he was relieving himself, they waited "to the point of embarrassment" before unlocking the door and finding their king dead.

Ehud escaped to the town of Seraiah in Ephraim. He sounded the shofar and rallied the Israelite tribes, who killed the Moabites, cutting off the fords of the Jordan River, and invaded Moab itself, killing about 10,000 Moabite soldiers.

After the death of Eglon, the narrative reports that there was peace in the land for 80 years.

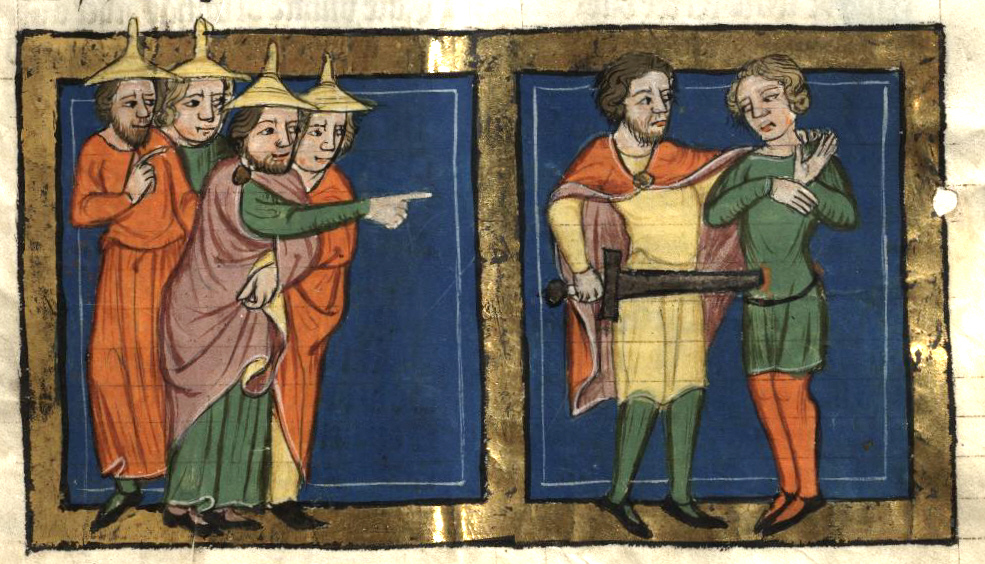
The Jews (wearing anachronistic Judenhüte) rejoice as Ehud kills Eglon; from Rudolf von Ems' Weltchronik, late 14th century

== Biblical criticism ==
Coogan argues that the story of Ehud was probably a folk tale of local origin that was edited by the Deuteronomistic historians. The Deuteronomistic historians "incorporated a variety of previously existing sources into their narrative of life in early Israel" and the story of Ehud is one such example of a "previously existing source", that has been edited to include "the cyclical pattern" typical of the stories of the major judges. This pattern consists of apostasy, hardship, crying out to the Lord, and rescue and it is clearly present in the tale of Ehud: apostasy and hardship occur in Judges 3.12, "The Israelites again did what was evil in the sight of the Lord; and the Lord strengthened King Eglon of Moab against Israel." The "crying out to the Lord" and the subsequent rescue are evident in Judges 3.15: "but when the Israelites cried out to the Lord, the Lord raised up for them a deliverer, Ehud son of Gera". The rather lively and glorious tale is ended with the refrain of "and the land had rest 80 years", (Judges 3.30) an ending typical to Gideon and other "major" judge stories in the book of Judges. He was the second judge chosen by God.

Barry Webb sees Ehud as "directed by the Lord, who used this most unlikely hero to bring deliverance to his undeserving but desperate people".

== See also ==
- Ehud (given name)
- Biblical judges
- Book of Judges

== Notes ==
Ehud Tribe of Benjamin
| Preceded by Othniel | Judge of Israel | Succeeded by Shamgar |
