= Ehud (given name) =

Ehud (Hebrew: אֵהוּד) is a Biblical given name, that has become common in Israel. Its etymology remains unknown.

The name "Ehud" did not appear as a first name among Jews until the 20th century. During the era of Zionism, and nation-building there was encouragement to adopt names of Jewish heroes and ancient warriors, including Ehud, as a result, it has gained popularity in contemporary Israel. Two prime ministers of Israel have had it as a first name: Ehud Barak and Ehud Olmert.

Israelis named Ehud are often nicknamed "Udi".

While the earliest known use is the Hebrew judge, the etymology is unknown. According to Amos Hakham, medieval rabbis favored one of two improbable explanations. Some, like the Vilna Gaon, claimed that the original name was אחוד (Eħud), but the letter ח ħet had become a ה he and thus relates to 'unity' אחד. Others claimed that the name relates to 'glory' הוד. The modern Israeli Hebrew verb, 'he sympathized' אהד is unrelated to the Biblical name Ehud. Eliezer Ben-Yehuda coined this verb, deriving it from the Arabic cognate hawadah, 'he treated with indulgence' or kindness. None of the above claims are accepted by contemporary linguists as legitimate etymologies or translations for the name.

Ehud can refer to the following people

- Ehud (Ehud ben Gera), Hebrew judge in the Book of Judges
- Ehud Olmert, Israeli prime minister from 2006 to 2009
- Ehud Barak, Israeli prime minister from 1999 to 2001 and minister of defense from 2007 to 2013
- Ehud "Udi" Adam, retired Israeli general
- Ehud Adiv, Israeli, formerly a pro-Palestinian political activist
- Ehud Avriel (1917–1980), Israeli politician and diplomat
- Ehud Banai (born 1953), Israeli singer and songwriter
- Ehud Hrushovski, Israeli mathematician
- Ehud Manor (died 2005), Israeli poet and TV personality
- Ehud Netzer, Israeli archaeologist
- Ehud Shapiro, Israeli scientist
- Ehud Sheleg, British-Israeli art dealer
- Ehud R. Toledano, Professor of Middle East history at Tel Aviv University and University Chair for Ottoman & Turkish Studies
- Ehud Tenenbaum, Israeli hacker
- Ehud Vaks, Israeli judo athlete
