= Eglon (king) =

King of Moab

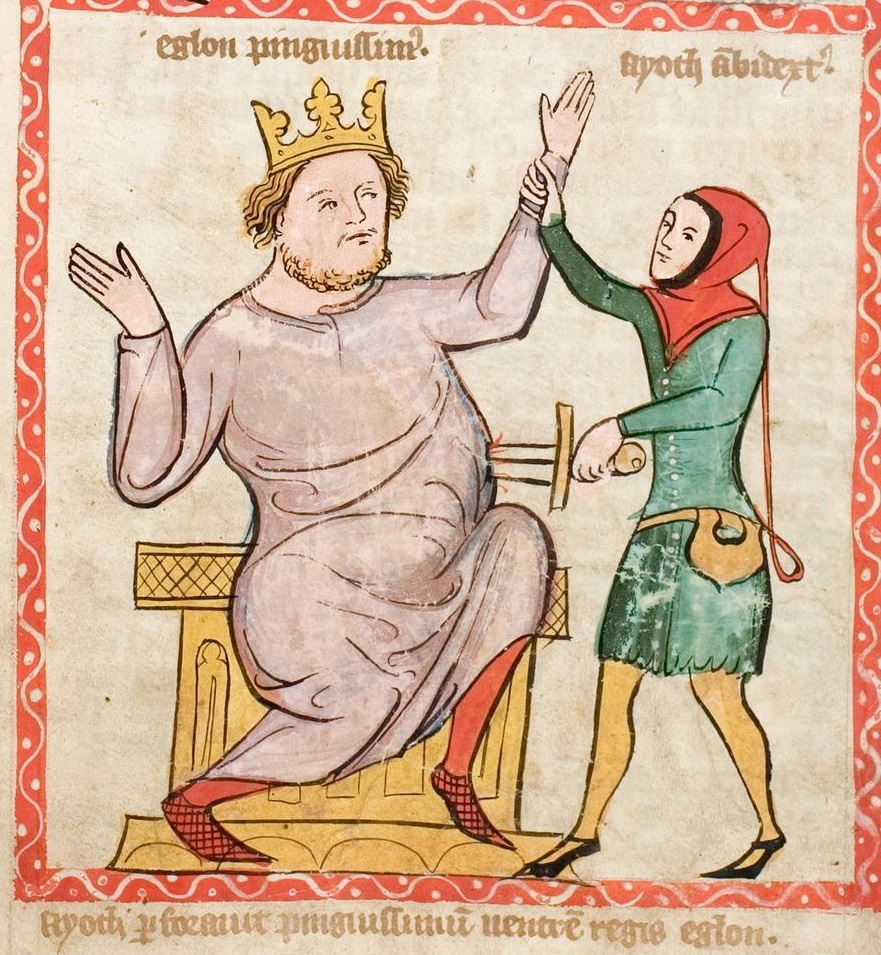
- Depiction of the assassination of King Eglon by Israelite Judge Ehud, Speculum Humanae Salvationis, 1360.

King of Moab
- Reign: c. 13th century BC
- Died: Kingdom of Moab
- Cause of death: Assassination

According to the Book of Judges, Eglon (Hebrew: עֶגְלוֹן 'Eglon) was a king of Moab who oppressed Israel.

== Biblical narrative ==
He was the head of the confederacy of Moab, Ammon and Amalek in their assault on Israel. Eglon reigned over the Israelites for 18 years. One day, Ehud, who was left handed, came presenting a customary tribute and tricked Eglon and stabbed him with his sword, but when Ehud attempted to draw the sword back out, the obese king's excess fat prevented its retrieval. His servants, believing he was relieving himself, left him be. In the aftermath of his death, the Moabites were routed and the Israelites enjoyed eighty years of peace.

Rabbis in the Talmudic tradition claimed that Ruth was Eglon's daughter. According to this tradition, Eglon was rewarded for rising out of respect when Ehud mentioned the Israelite God by having King David as a descendant. This can also be seen as an attempt to provide a royal lineage to David. The Talmud also describes Eglon as the grandson of Balak.

== His descendants ==
According to a legend in a midrash, the two Moabite women from the Book of Ruth, Orpah and Ruth, were sisters, and both were daughters of the Moabite king Eglon (Ruth R. ii. 9). According to this same midrash Eglon was a son of Balak, the king of Moab introduced in the Book of Numbers Numbers 22.

Talmudic folklore states that, because Eglon stood up when Ehud said he had a message for him from God (Judges 3:20), his reward was that his descendant would be King David.

== Gallery ==
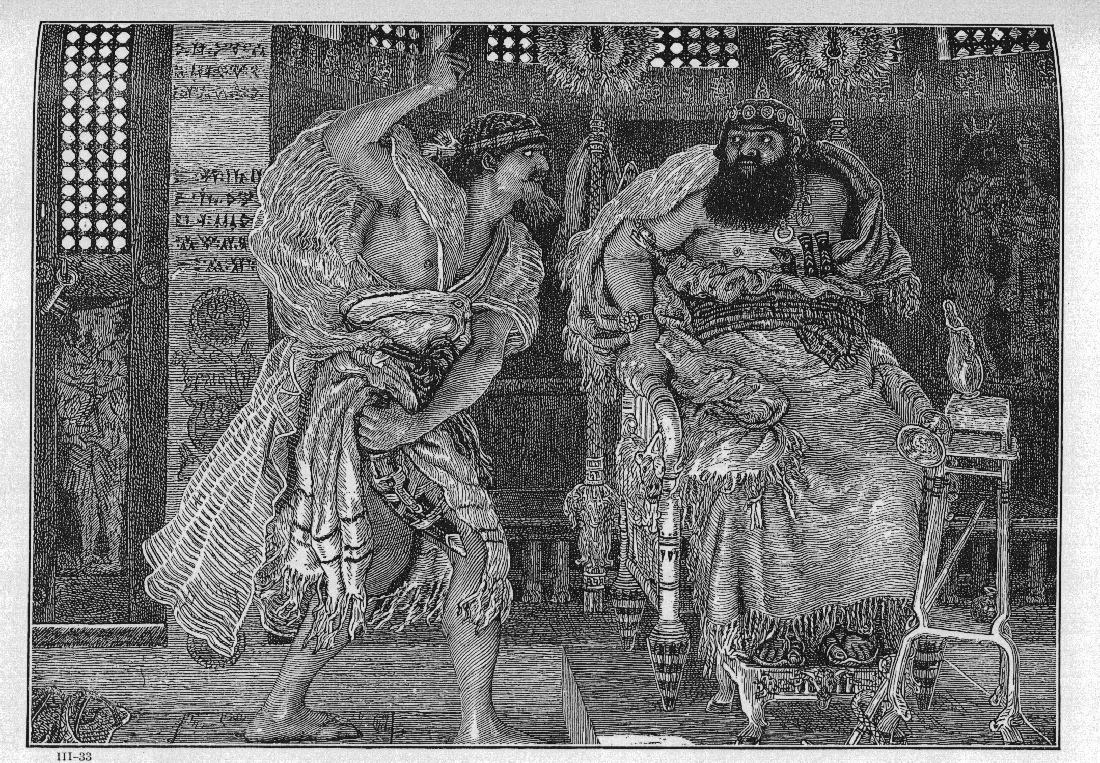
Ehud killing Eglon, by Ford Madox Brown

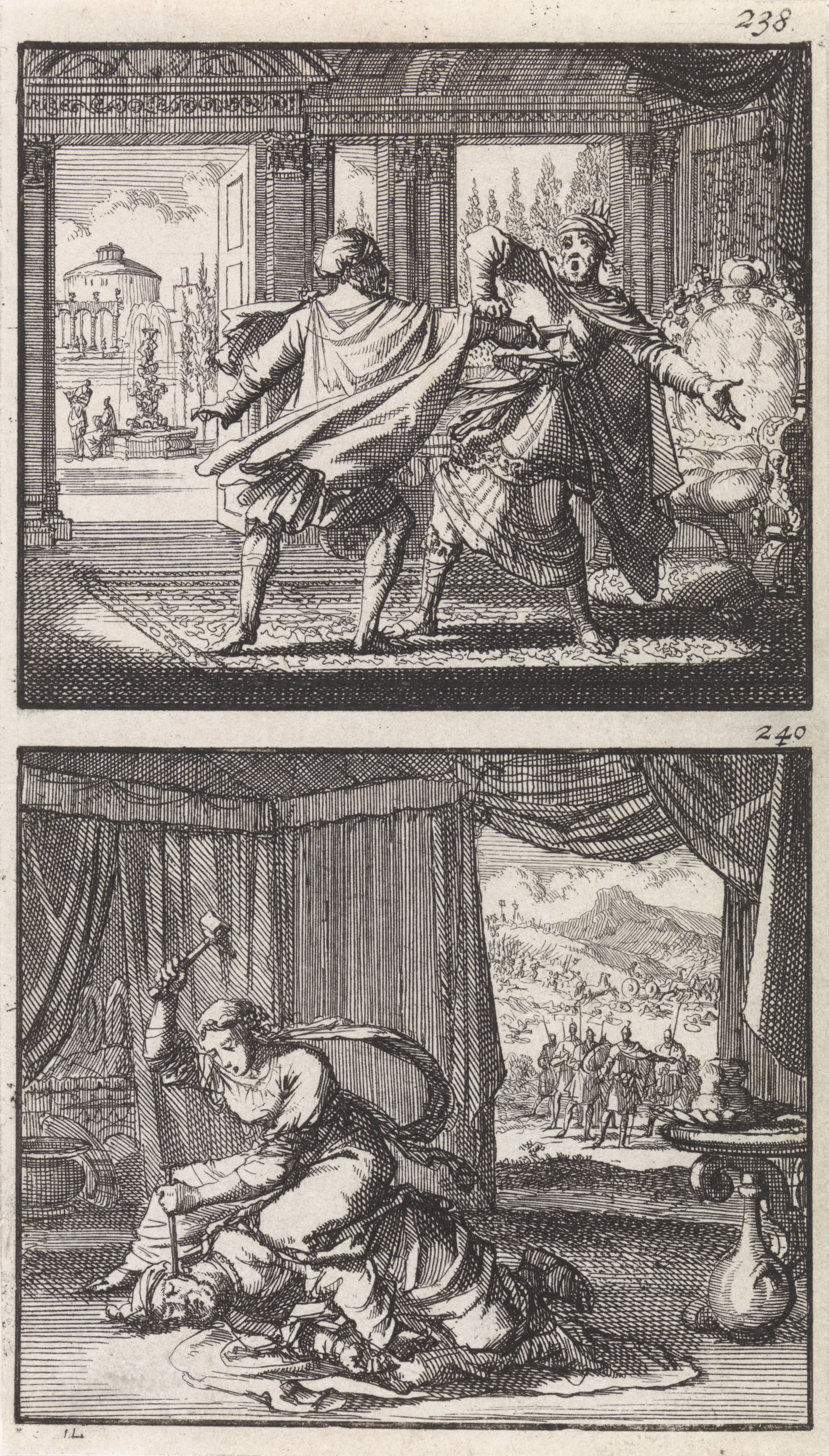
Ehud killing Eglon (top), by Jan Luyken

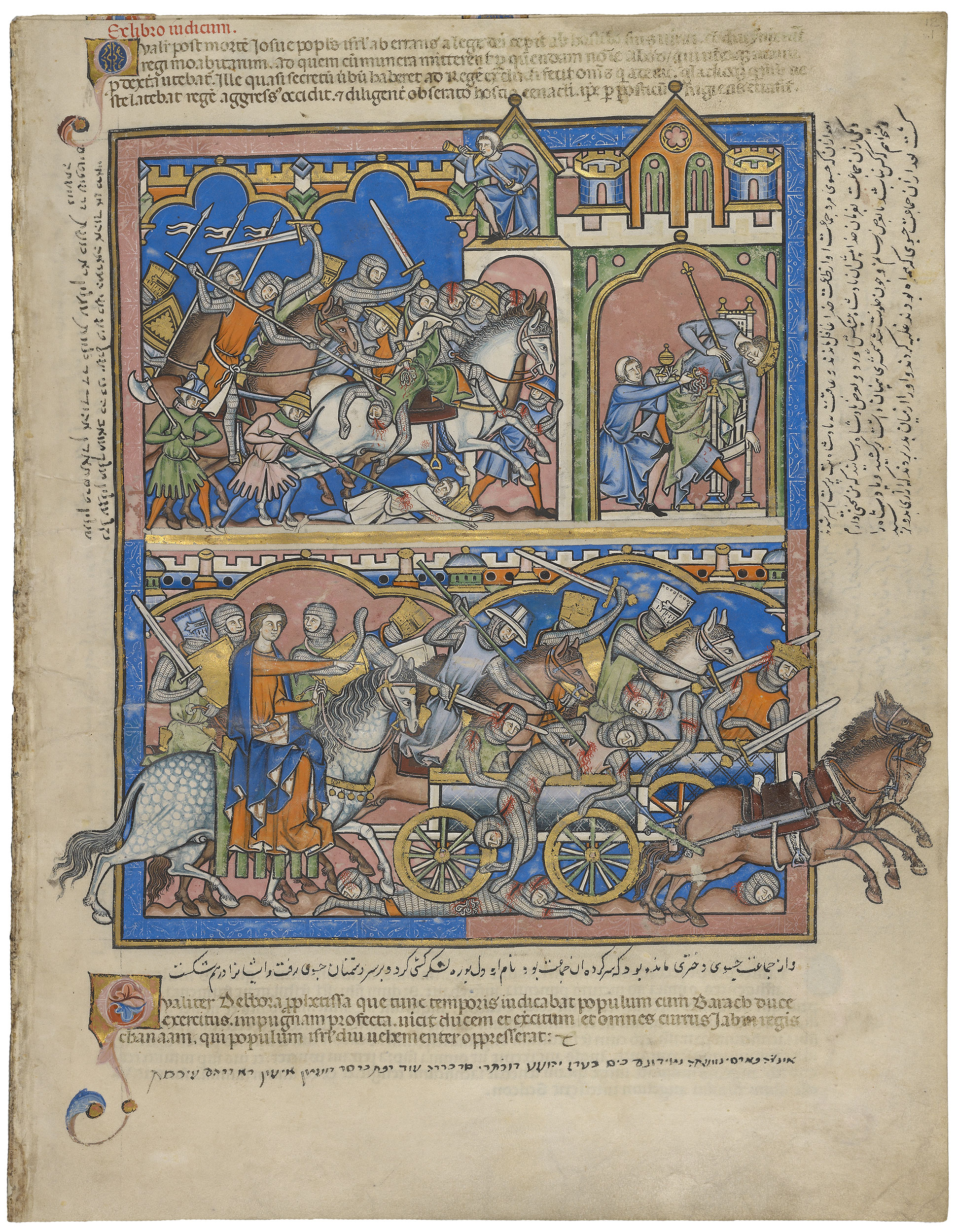
Ehud killing Eglon (at upper right), from the Morgan Bible

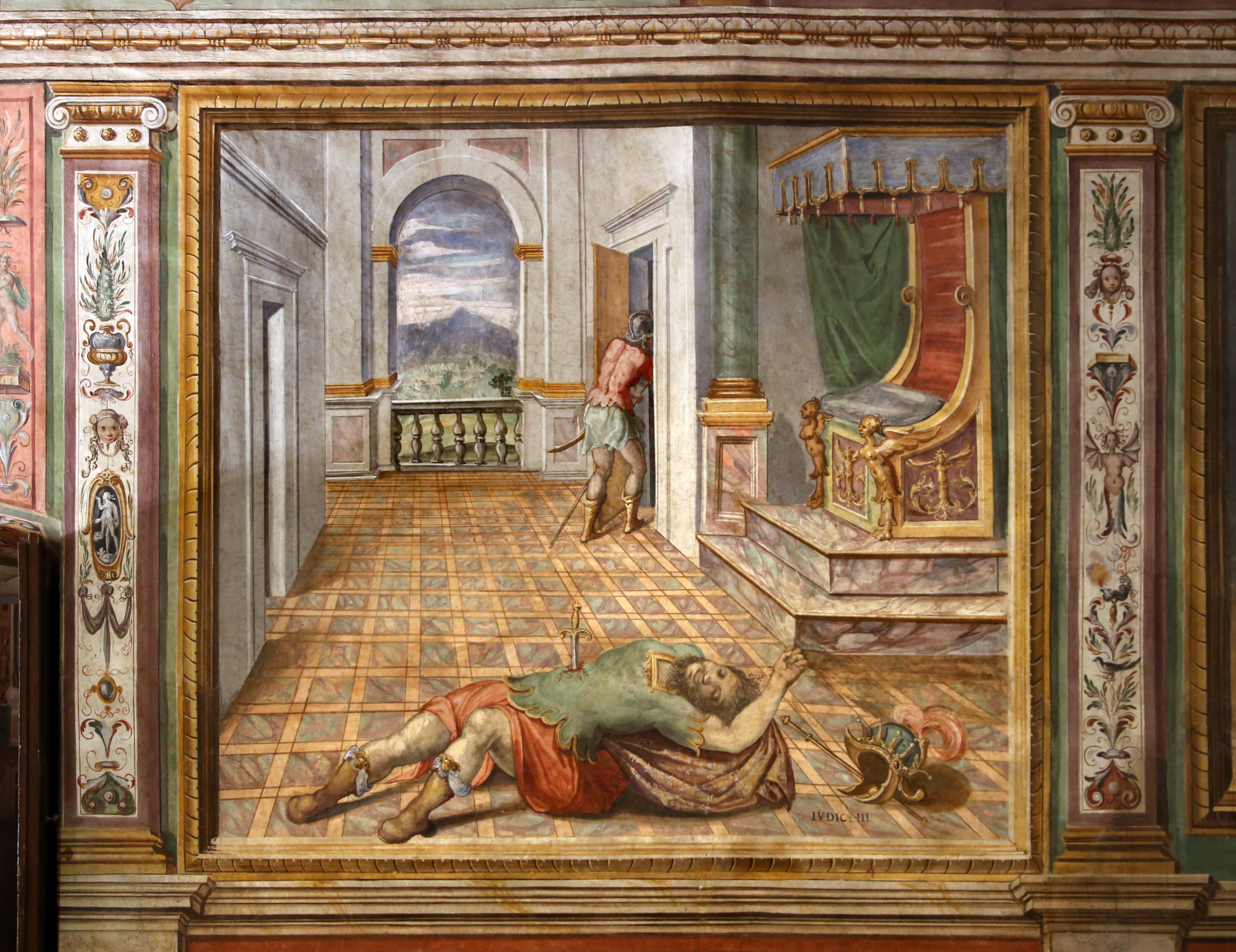
The death of Eglon, by Teofilo Torri

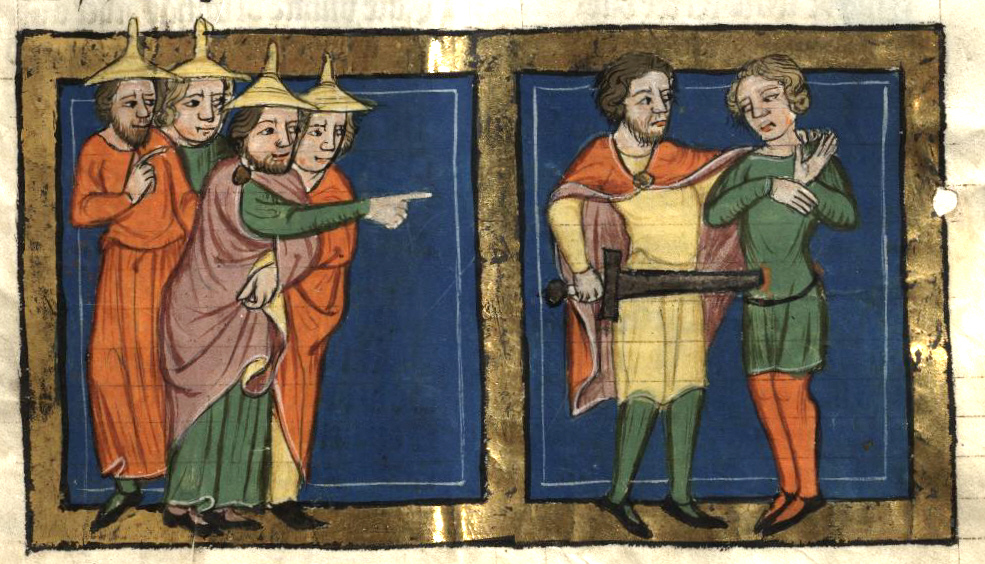
Ehud killing Eglon, from the Weltchronik Fulda
