= Muhay =

Muhay محي
- Location in Jordan
- Coordinates: 30°59′31.6″N 35°51′45.5″E
- Country: Jordan
- Governorate: Karak Governorate

Population (2015)
  - Total: 4,293
- Time zone: UTC+2

Muhay or Mhiyy (Arabic: محي, romanized: Muḥāy) is a village in the Karak Governorate of south-central Jordan.

== Archaeology ==
Archaeologically, Muḥay is known to be built over the remains of a large ancient settlement in the historical region of Moab. Two Byzantine cemeteries are reported at the site, one located northwest and the other southwest of the modern village. These cemeteries yielded at least sixty-eight tombstones bearing Greek inscriptions published by Reginetta Canova in the 1950s.

One tombstone records the burial of Porphyria, daughter of Sozomenos, her age at death, and the date of her death expressed through a month name, indiction number, and year count, which the authors convert to 22 March 577–21 March 578 AD.

== Bibliography ==
- Aliquot, Julien; al-Shdaifat, Younis (2020-01-02). "Greek Christian epitaphs from Charakmoba and the Land of Moab". Palestine Exploration Quarterly. 152 (1): 3–26. doi:10.1080/00310328.2020.1712834. ISSN 0031-0328.
- Department of Statistics (2015). عدد سكان المملكة حسب التقسيمات الإدارية والجنس والأسر استنادا لنتائج التعداد العام للسكان والمساكن [The Population of the Kingdom by Administrative Divisions, According to the 2015 General Census] (PDF). Archived from the original on 2018-09-20.
