= Hebrew Bible judges =

Authority in the early history of Israel

The judges (sing. Hebrew: שופט, romanized: šōp̄ēṭ, pl. שופטים šōp̄əṭīm) whose stories are recounted in the Hebrew Bible, primarily in the Book of Judges, were individuals who served as military, political, and spiritual leaders of the tribes of Israel in times of crisis, in the period before the monarchy was established.

== Role ==
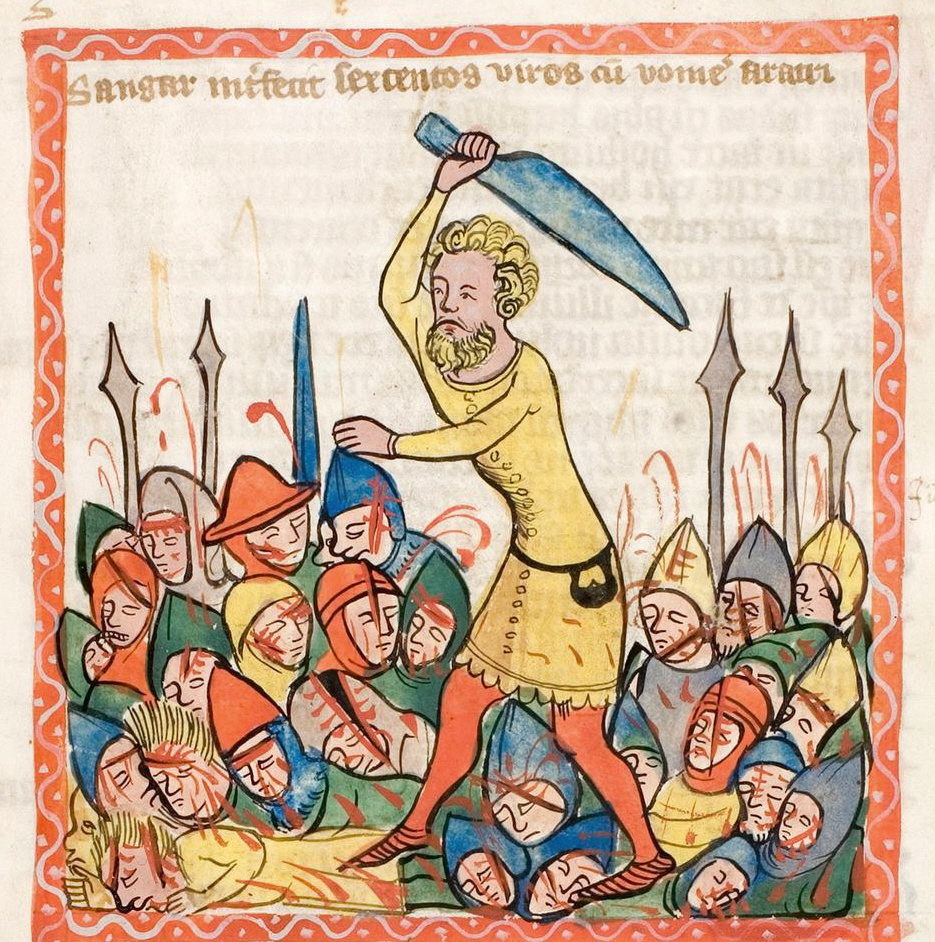
Shamgar slaughters 600 men with an ox goad in Judges 3:31 as illustrated in a medieval German manuscript.

A cyclical pattern is regularly recounted in the Book of Judges to show the need for the various judges: apostasy of the Israelite people, hardship brought on as divine retribution, and crying out to Yahweh, and rescue of the people by Yahweh. Consequently, God chooses a judge from a certain tribe of Israel who rescues the people from the divine retribution, usually enemies, and establishes justice.

While judge is a literalistic translation of the term shophet used in the Masoretic Text (as well as by other Canaanitic-speaking societies), the position as described in Judges 12:7–15 is an unelected non-hereditary leadership rather than a position of legal pronouncements. Cyrus H. Gordon argued the shophetim may have come from among the hereditary leaders of the fighting, landed, and ruling aristocracy, like the basileis or kings of Homer. Coogan says that they were most likely tribal or local leaders, contrary to the Deuteronomistic historian's portrayal of them as leaders of all of Israel, but Malamat pointed out that in the text, their authority is described as being recognized by local groups or tribes beyond their own. The term is sometimes rendered as "chieftain", although Robert Alter cautions that this misrepresents shophetim as a normal leadership structure. The other words translated as judge are elohim and pelilim.

== Historicity and timeline ==
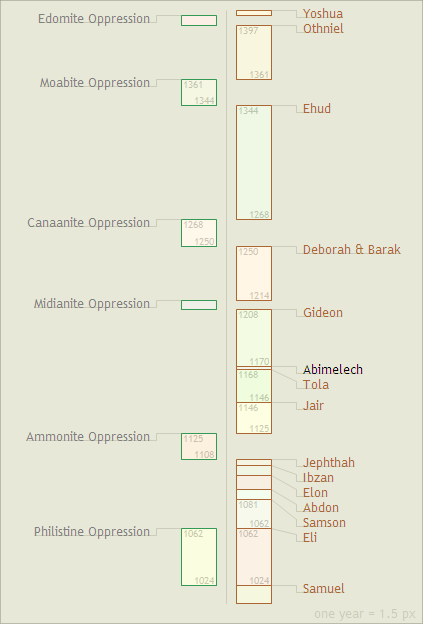
Timeline of biblical judges (one interpretation)

The biblical scholar Kenneth Kitchen argues that from the conquest of Canaan by Joshua until the formation of the Kingdom of Israel and Judah (c. 1150–1025 BCE), the Israelite tribes may have formed a loose confederation. No central government would have existed in this conception, but in times of crisis, the people would have been led by ad hoc chieftains known as shophetim. However, some scholars are uncertain whether such a role existed in ancient Israel. Others doubt about any historicity of the Book of Judges.

The book is generally too problematic to use as a historical source. [...] Two points relating to history, however, can be made about the book of Judges: first, the picture of a tribal society without a unified leadership engaging in uncoordinated local actions seems to fit the society of the hill country in IA I [Iron Age I], as evidenced by the archaeology ... Secondly, perhaps the one exception to the historical ambiguity of the text is the Song of Deborah in Judges 5. [citation omitted]

Working with the chronology in Judges, Payne points out that although the timescale of Judges is indicated by Jephthah's statement (Judges 11:26) that Israel had occupied the land for around 300 years, some of the judges overlapped one another. Claiming that Deborah's victory has been confirmed as taking place in 1216 from archaeology undertaken at Hazor, he suggests that the period may have lasted from c. 1382 to c. 1063. Bill T. Arnold and Hugh G. M. Williamson wrote:

all the figures given in Judges (years of oppression, years the judges led Israel, years of peace achieved by the judges) are treated as consecutive, then the total duration of the events described in Judges is 410 years. If we accept a date of 1000 BCE for the beginning of David's reign over all Israel, which puts the beginning of Eli's leadership of Israel at about 1100 BCE, then the judges period would begin no later than 1510 BCE—impossible even for those who date the conquest to the fifteenth century BCE.

== Mentioned judges ==
In the Hebrew Bible, Moses is described as a shophet over the Israelites and appoints others to whom cases were delegated following the advice of Jethro, his Midianite father-in-law. The Book of Judges mentions twelve leaders who are said to "judge" Israel: Othniel, Ehud, Shamgar, Deborah, Gideon, Tola, Jair, Jephthah, Ibzan, Elon, Abdon, and Samson. On the basis of the length of the biblical narrative referring to them, the six of them (Othniel, Ehud, Deborah, Gideon, Jephthah and Samson) are regarded as the major judges, with the rest being the minor judges.

The First Book of Samuel mentions Eli and Samuel, as well as Joel and Abiah (two sons of Samuel). The First Book of Chronicles mentions Kenaniah and his sons. The Second Book of Chronicles mentions Amariah and Zebadiah (son of Ishmael).

The Book of Judges also recounts the story of Abimelech, an illegitimate son of Gideon, who was appointed as a judge-like leader by the citizens of the city of Shechem. He was later overthrown during a local conflict, and the classification of Abimelech as a judge is questionable.

The biblical text does not generally describe these leaders as "a judge", but says that they "judged Israel", using the verb שָׁפַט (š-f-t). Thus, Othniel "judged Israel forty years" (Judges 3:11), Tola "judged Israel twenty-three years" (Judges 10:2), and Jair judged Israel twenty-two years (Judges 10:3).

According to the Book of Judges, Deborah (Hebrew: דְּבוֹרָה, romanized: Dəḇorā, lit. 'Bee') was a female prophet of the God of the Israelites, the fourth Judge of pre-monarchic Israel and the only female judge mentioned in the Bible.

== See also ==
- Judges in the Book of Mormon
