= Deborah =

Prophetess in the Bible

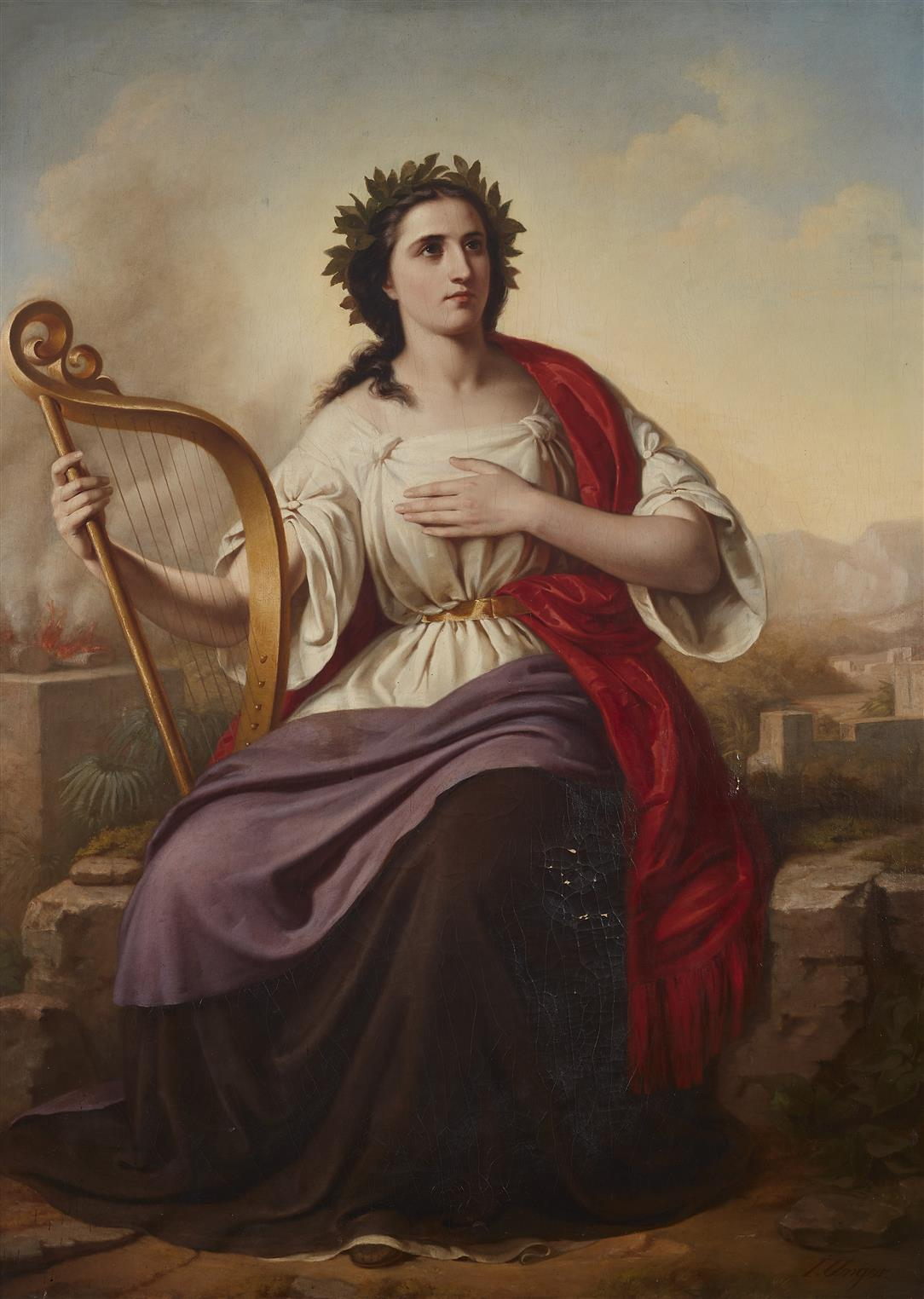
- Deborah by Johanna Unger, 19th century
- Other names: Debora, Débora, Dvora, Debra
- Occupations: Prophetess of God, Fourth Judge of Israel
- Predecessor: Shamgar
- Successor: Gideon
- Spouse: Lapidoth (possibly)

According to the Book of Judges, Deborah (Hebrew: דְּבוֹרָה, Dəḇōrā) was a prophetess of Judaism, the fourth Judge of pre-monarchic Israel and the only female judge mentioned in the Hebrew Bible. Many scholars contend that the phrase, "a woman of Lappidoth", as translated from biblical Hebrew in Judges 4:4 denotes her marital status as the wife of Lapidoth. Alternatively, "lappid" translates as "torch" or "lightning", therefore the phrase, "woman of Lappidoth" could be referencing Deborah as a "fiery woman". Deborah told Barak, an Israelite general from Kedesh in Naphtali, that God commanded him to lead an attack against the forces of Jabin king of Canaan and his military commander Sisera (Judges 4:6–7); the entire narrative is recounted in chapter 4.

Judges 5 gives the same story in poetic form. This passage, often called The Song of Deborah, may date to as early as the twelfth century BCE. It and the Song of the Sea from Exodus are sometimes cited as the earliest sample of Hebrew poetry.

== Biblical narrative ==
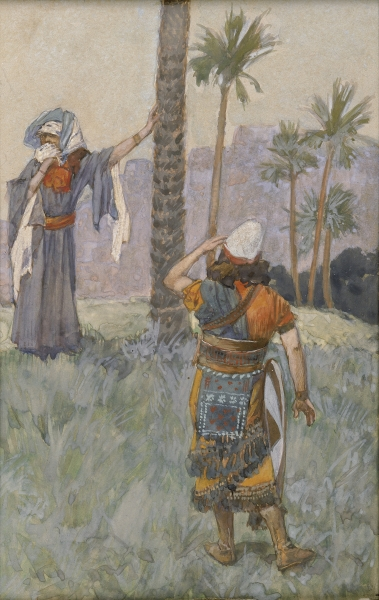
Deborah Beneath the Palm Tree (c. 1896–1902), James Tissot

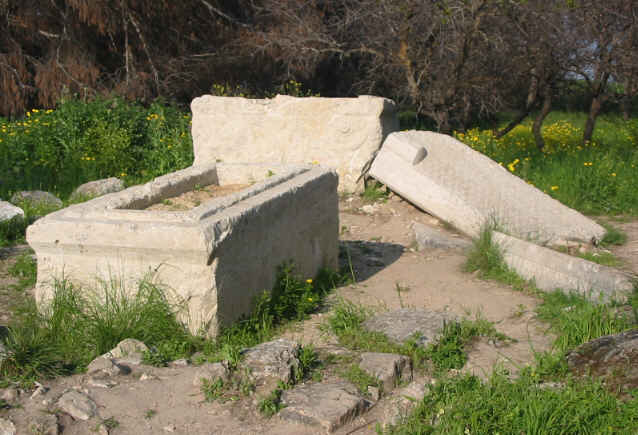
Grave near Kedesh attributed to Barak or Deborah

In the Book of Judges, it is stated that Deborah was a prophetess, a judge of Israel and the wife of Lapidoth. She rendered her judgments beneath a date palm tree between Ramah in Benjamin and Bethel in the land of Ephraim.

The people of Israel had been oppressed by Jabin, the king of Canaan, whose capital was Hazor, for twenty years. Stirred by the wretched condition of Israel she sends a message to Barak, the son of Abinoam, at Kedesh in Naphtali, and tells him that the Lord God had commanded him to muster ten thousand troops of Naphtali and Zebulun and concentrate them upon Mount Tabor, the mountain at the northern angle of the great plain of Esdraelon. At the same time she states that the Lord God of Israel will draw Sisera, commander of Jabin's army, to the Kishon River. Barak declines to go without the prophet. Deborah consents, but declares that the glory of the victory will therefore belong to a woman. As soon as the news of the rebellion reaches Sisera, he collects nine hundred chariots of iron and a host of people.

Then Deborah said, according to Judges 4:14:

"Go! This is the day the Lord has given Sisera into your hands. Has not the Lord gone ahead of you?" So Barak went down Mount Tabor, with ten thousand men following him.

As Deborah prophesied, a battle is fought (led by Barak), and Sisera is completely defeated. He escapes on foot while his army is pursued as far as Harosheth Haggoyim and destroyed. Sisera comes to the tent of Jael and lies down to rest. He asks for a drink, she gives him milk and he falls asleep. While he is asleep she hammers a tent-pin through his temple.

The Biblical account of Deborah ends with the statement that after the battle, there was peace in the land for 40 years (Judges 5:31).

=== The Song of Deborah ===
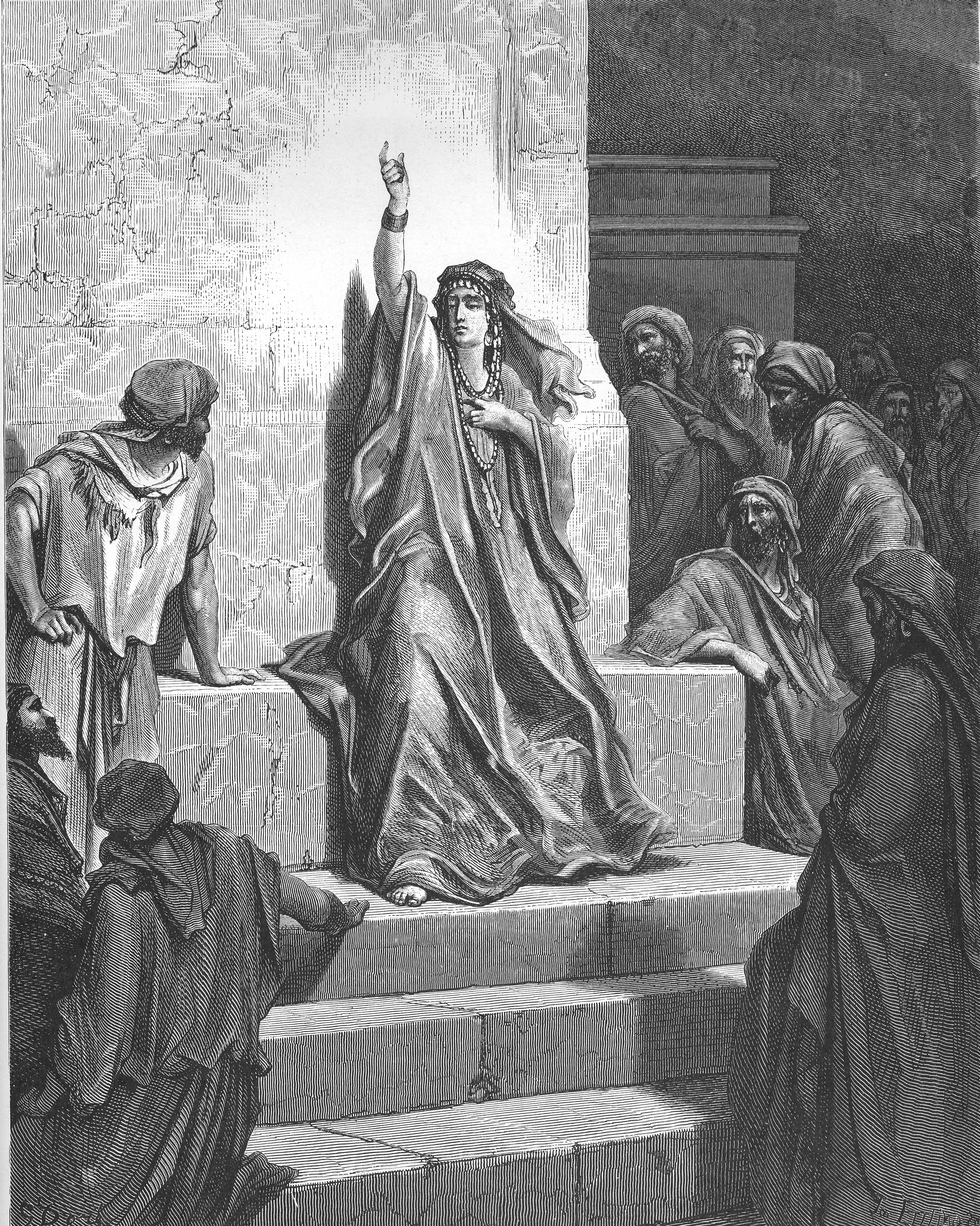
Gustave Doré's illustrations for La Grande Bible de Tours (1865)

The Song of Deborah is found in Judges 5 and is a victory hymn, sung by Deborah and Barak. It describes the defeat of Canaanite adversaries by some of the tribes of Israel. The song itself differs slightly from the events described in Judges 4, mentioning six participating tribes: Ephraim, Benjamin, Machir—a group associated with the Tribe of Manasseh—Zebulun, Issachar and Naphtali, as opposed to the two tribes in Judges 4:6 (Naphtali and Zebulun) and does not mention the role of Jabin (king of Hazor). The song also rebukes three other tribes (Reuben, Dan, and Asher) for their lack of patriotism, not mentioning the tribes of Gad, Simeon and Judah. Michael Coogan writes that for the redactors of the Song of Deborah, that the Canaanite general Sisera ends up being murdered by a woman (Jael)—the ultimate degradation—"is a further sign that Yahweh ultimately is responsible for the victory".

Though the presence of victory hymns is conventional in the Hebrew Bible, the Song of Deborah is unusual in that it is a hymn that celebrates a military victory of two women: Deborah, the prophetess and Jael, the warrior. Jael—the heroine of the Song of Deborah—shares parallels with the main character of the Book of Judith, who uses her beauty and charm to kill an Assyrian general who has besieged her city, Bethulia.

The Song of Deborah is commonly identified as among the oldest texts of the Bible, but the date of its composition is controversial. Many scholars estimate a date as early as the 12th century BCE, though others estimate it to have been written between c. 700 and c. 450 BCE or even as late as the 3rd century BCE.

== Traditional chronology ==
The Seder Olam Rabbah places Deborah's 40 years of judging Israel (Judges 5:31) from 1107 BC until her death in 1067 BC. The Dictionary of World Biography: The Ancient World claims that she might have lived in the period between 1200 BC and 1124 BC. Based on archaeological findings, different biblical scholars have argued that Deborah's war with Sisera best fits the context of either the second half of the 12th century BC or the second half of the 11th century BC. Sisera is a non-Semitic name, and the story is set "in the days of Shamgar", a hero famous for killing 600 Philistines. Many scholars, such as Łukasz Niesiołowski-Spanò, believe that the story is really about the Sea Peoples. One archaeological stratum of Hazor dating from around 1200 BCE shows signs of catastrophic fire.

Some scholars like Israel Finkelstein, who associated the first monarchy of Israel with the Gibeon-Gibeah polity of the early to mid 10th century BC, placed the background of the Song of Deborah in the early 10th century BCE, associating it with the Late Iron Age I (c. 1050–950 BCE) destruction of Megiddo, which dates to c. 1000–985 BCE. Other scholars suggest the poem fits into a 1200’s BCE backdrop ‘perfectly’, as reflected in the literature from Ugarit around the same time.

== Gallery ==
Artistic depictions of Deborah
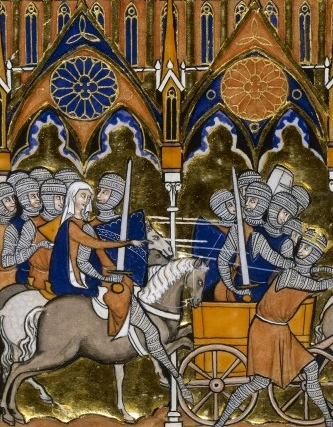
Deborah and Barak in a miniature from the 13th-century Psalter of St. Louis

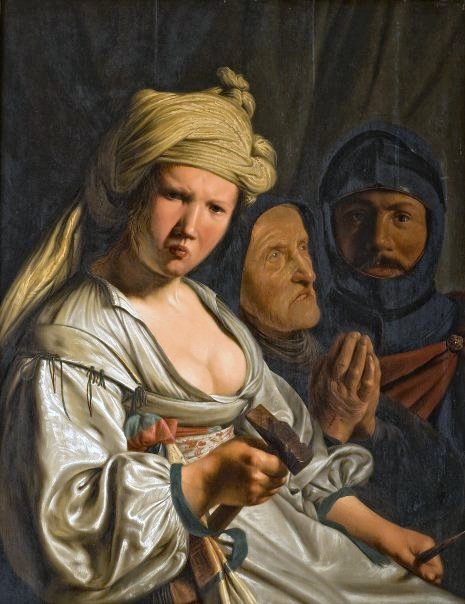
Jael, Deborah, and Barak (c. 1630) by Salomon de Bray

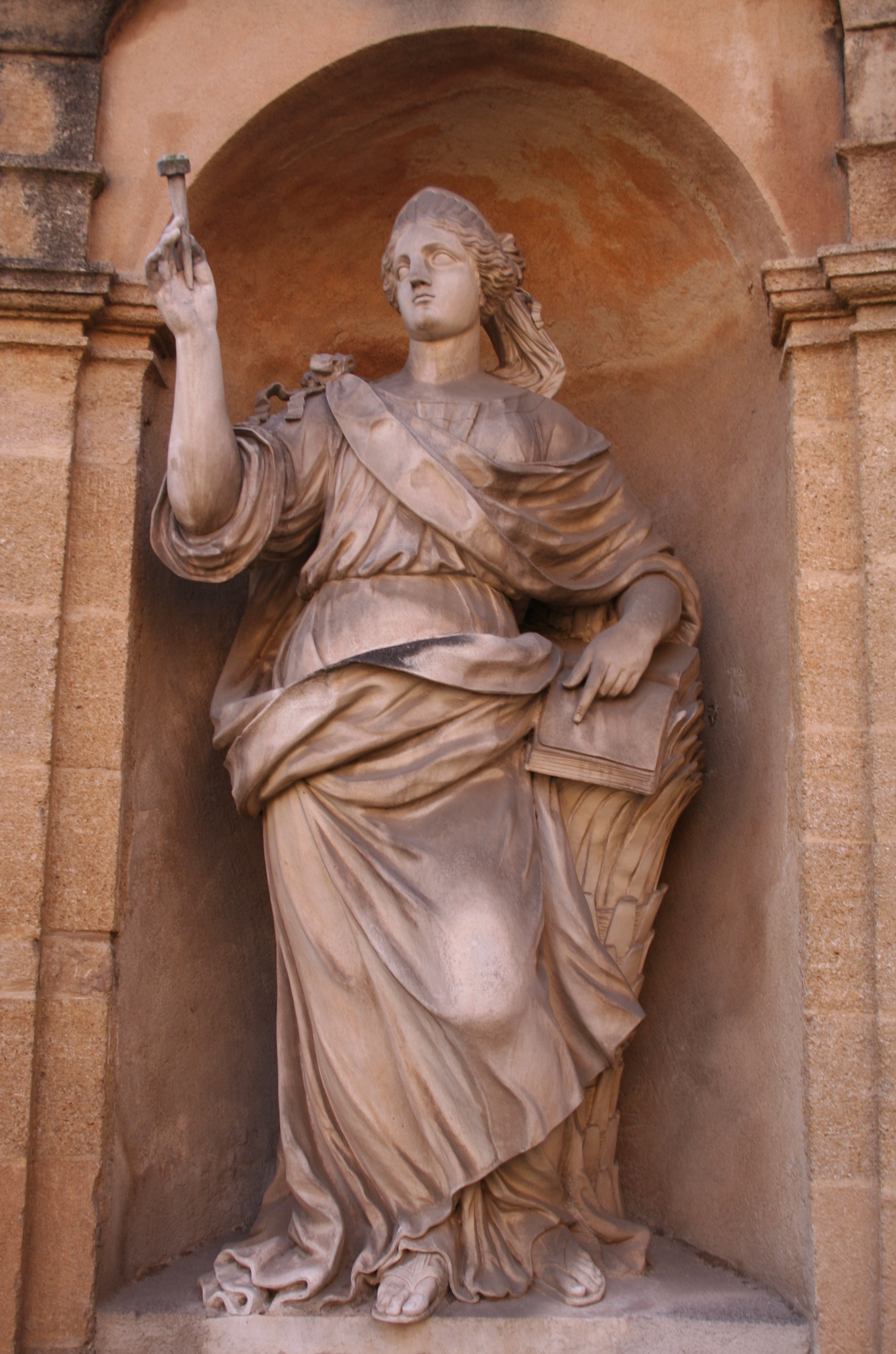
A statue of Deborah (1792) in Aix-en-Provence, France

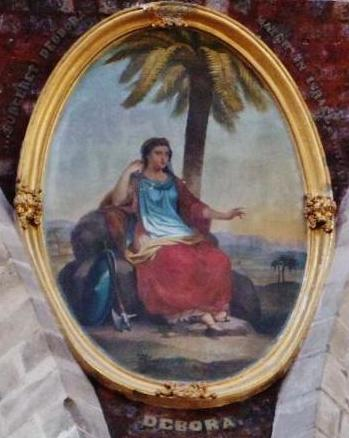
Deborah depicted in a pendentive of a church dome in Tenancingo, Mexico

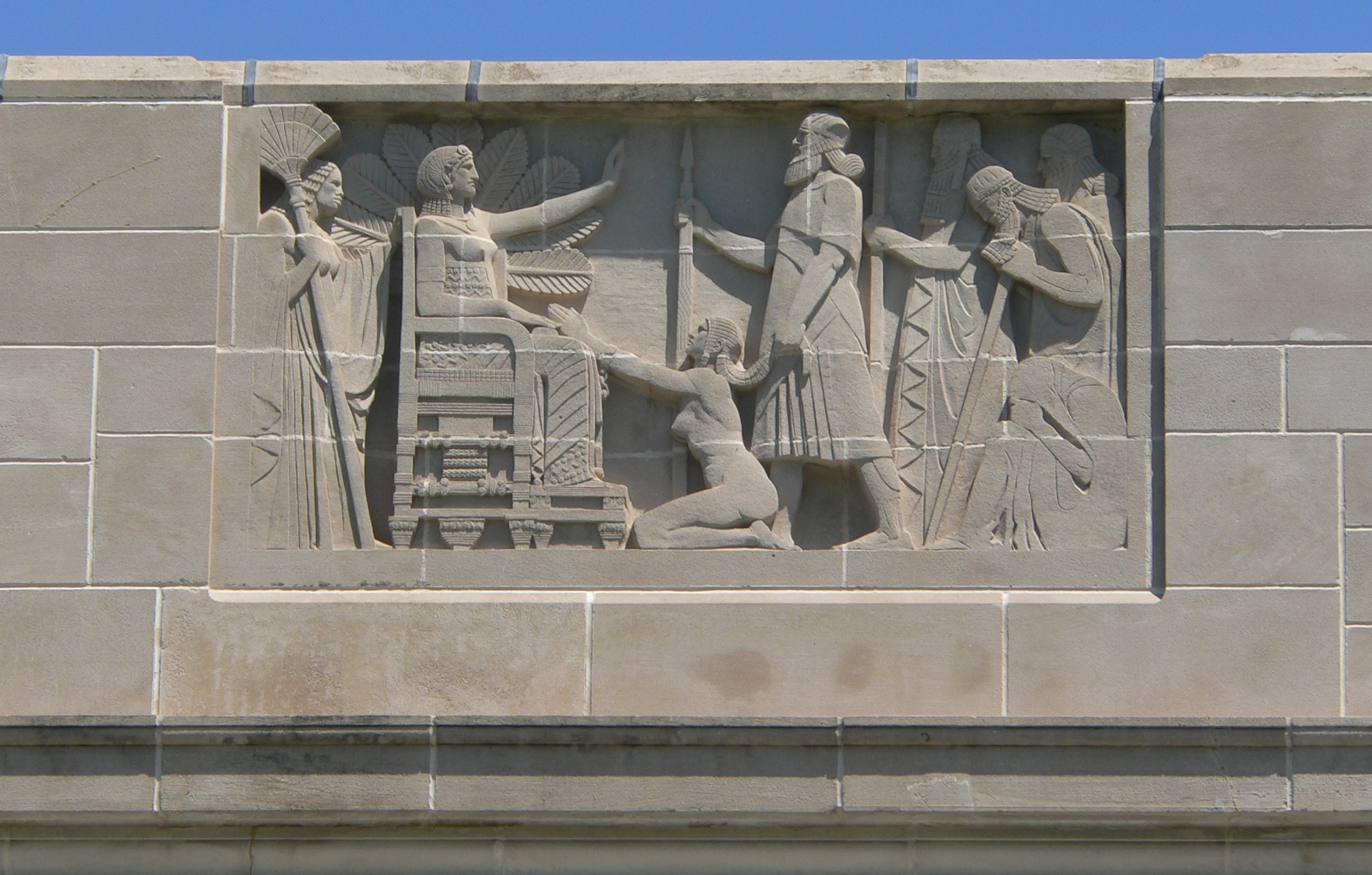
Deborah Judging Israel, west-facing panel at the northwest corner of the Nebraska State Capitol

== See also ==
- Battle of Mount Tabor (biblical)
- The Deborah number
- Handel's Deborah (Handel)

| Preceded by Shamgar | Judge of Israel | Succeeded by Gideon |
