= Shamgar =

Individual named in the Book of Judges

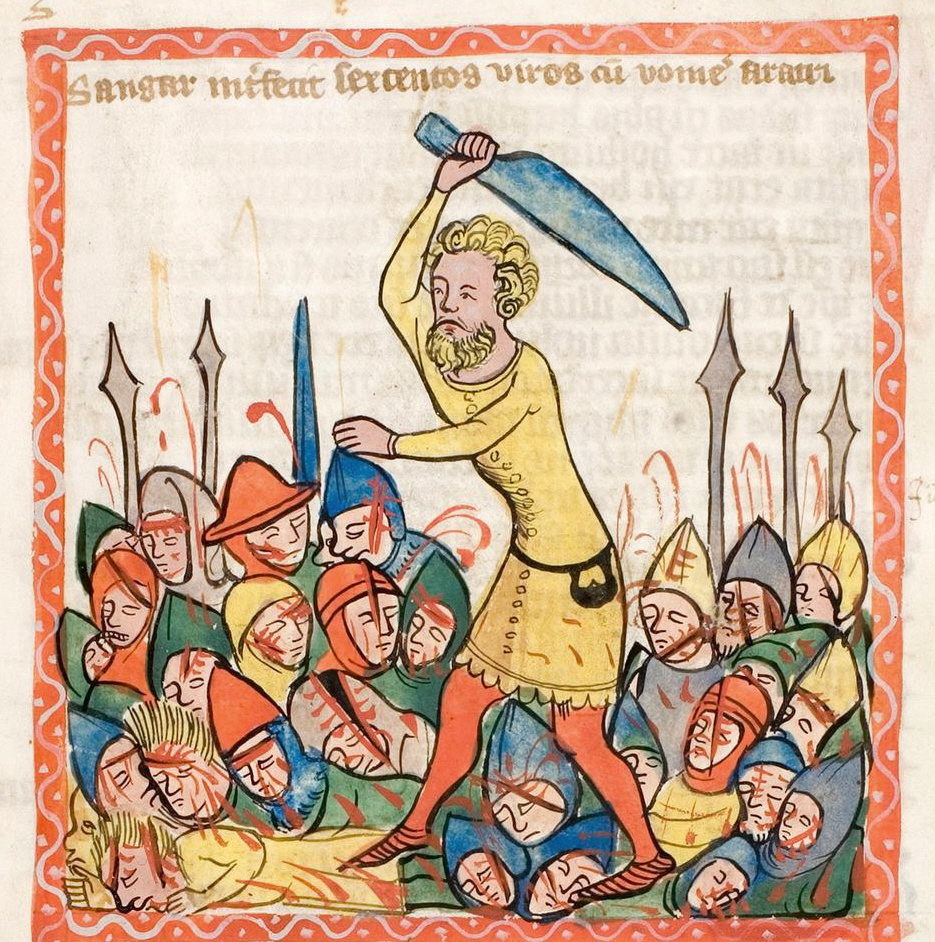
- Medieval depiction of Shamgar
- Predecessor: Ehud?
- Successor: Deborah?

Shamgar, son of Anath (Hebrew: שַׁמְגַּר Šamgar), is the name of one or possibly two individuals named in the Book of Judges. The name occurs twice:

1. at the first mention, Shamgar is identified as a man who repelled Philistine incursions into Israelite regions, and slaughtered 600 of the invaders with an ox goad (Judges 3:31);
2. the other mention is within the Song of Deborah, where Shamgar is described as having been one of the prior rulers, in whose days roads were abandoned, with travelers taking winding paths, and village life collapsing (Judges 5:6).

Unlike the descriptions of Biblical Judges, the first reference to Shamgar has no introduction, conclusion, or reference to the length of reign, and it is not said that he judged Israel. The subsequent text follows on directly from the previous narrative. In several ancient manuscripts this reference to Shamgar occurs after the accounts of Samson rather than immediately after the account of Ehud, in a way that is more narratively consistent; some scholars believe that this latter position is more likely to be the passage's original location.

The act of this Shamgar is similar to that of Shammah, son of Agee, mentioned in the appendix of the Books of Samuel as being one of The Three, a distinct group of warriors associated with King David. Scholars are not certain as to whether the same individual was originally meant, and that the passage in the book of Judges was later moved to its present location, or whether each of the two figures were different heroes. Scholars also believe that the name of the individual may originally have been Shammah, and became corrupted under the influence of the Shamgar in the Song of Deborah. The term usually translated as oxgoad is a biblical hapax legomenon, the translation into English being made on the basis of the Septuagint's translation into Greek.

The other mention of Shamgar, that in the Song of Deborah, connects Shamgar with a low period of Israelite society.

The Jewish Encyclopedia suspects him of having been a foreign oppressor of the Israelites, rather than an Israelite ruler. From the form of the name, it is suspected that Shamgar may actually have been a Hittite, a similar name occurring with Sangara, a Hittite king of Carchemish; more recent scholars hold that the name is of Hurrian origin and may well be Šimig-ari.

The Bible also indicates that he was the "son" of Anath (the name of a Canaanite deity). In recent years, arrowheads bearing the names ben-anat and Aramaic bar anat, dating from the 11th to 7th centuries BC, have been discovered. This has led several recent scholars to theorize that the expression "son of Anath" probably designates a warrior title.

== See also ==
- Gershom

== References and citations ==
| Preceded by Ehud | Judge of Israel | Succeeded by Deborah and Barak |
