= J. Maxwell Miller (biblical scholar) =

Professor of Old Testament studies

James Maxwell Miller (born 20 September 1937) is an American Old Testament scholar. He was born in Kosciusko, Mississippi and studied at Millsaps College (BA, 1958) and Emory University (PhD, 1964). He is Professor Emeritus of Old Testament at the Candler School of Theology, Emory University.

In 2002, a Festschrift was published in his honor. The Land that I Will Show You: Essays on the History and Archaeology of the Ancient Near East in Honor of J. Maxwell Miller included contributions from Philip R. Davies, Jack M. Sasson, and John Van Seters.
