= Book of Judges =

Seventh book of the Bible

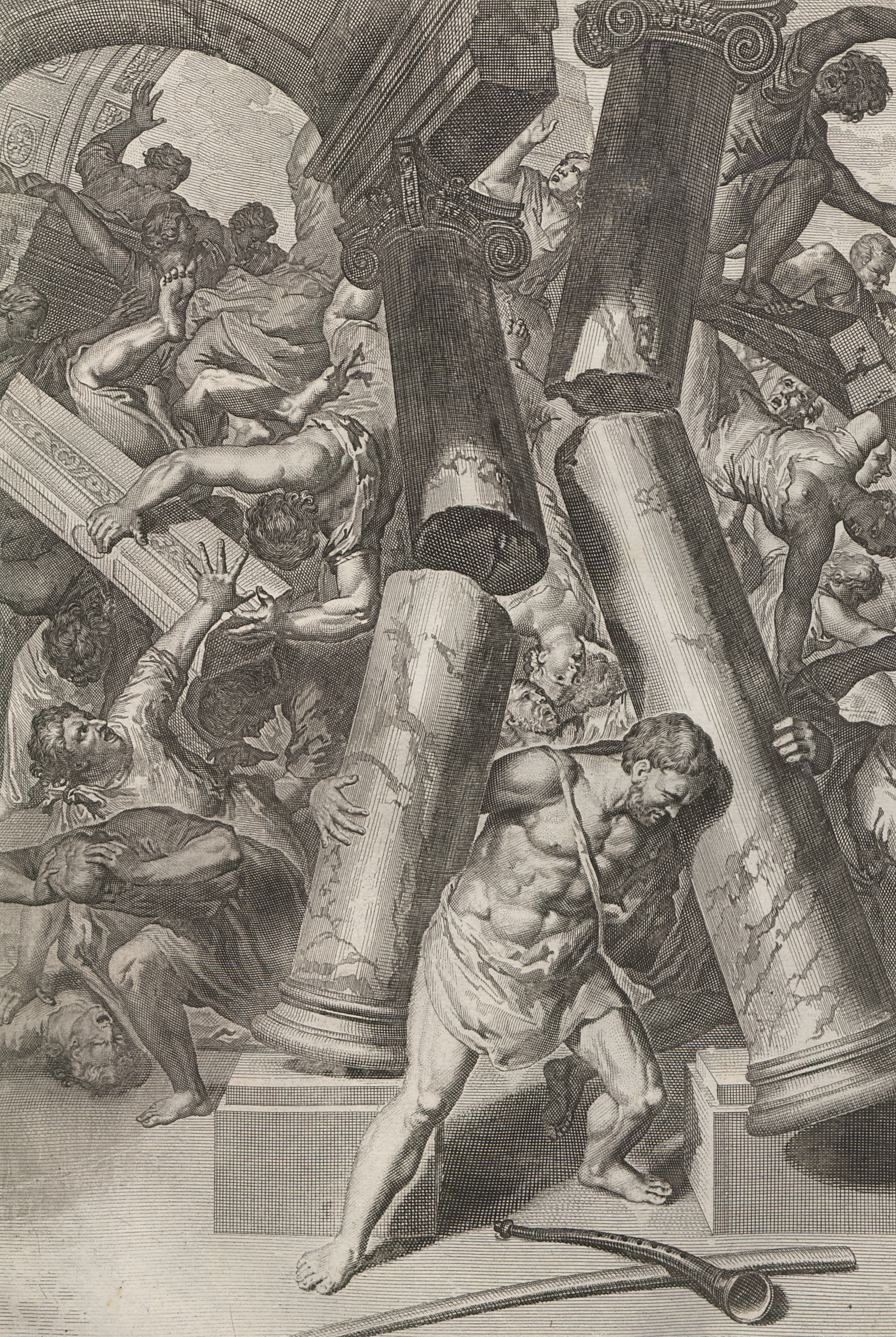
Samson

The Book of Judges (Note: Hebrew: ספר שופטים, romanized: Sefer Shoftim, pronounced [ˈsefeʁ ʃofˈtim]; Greek: Κριταί, romanized: Critae, pronounced [kɾiˈte]; Latin: Liber Iudicum) is the seventh book of the Hebrew Bible and the Christian Old Testament. In the narrative of the Hebrew Bible, it covers the time between the conquest described in the Book of Joshua and the establishment of a kingdom in the Books of Samuel, during which biblical judges served as temporary leaders.

The stories follow a consistent pattern: the people are unfaithful to Yahweh; he therefore delivers them into the hands of their enemies; the people repent and entreat Yahweh for mercy, which he sends in the form of a leader or champion; (Note: a "judge"; see shophet) the judge delivers the Israelites from oppression and they prosper, but soon they fall again into unfaithfulness and the cycle is repeated. The pattern also expresses a repeating cycle of wars. But in the last verse (21:25) there is a hint that the cycle can be broken—with the establishment of a monarchy.

While some view parts of the book—like the Song of Deborah—as reflecting the history of pre-monarchic Israel, most critical scholars see it as largely non-historical.

== Contents ==
Judges can be divided into three major sections: a double prologue (chapters 1:1–3:6), a main body (3:7–16:31), and a double epilogue (17–21).

=== Prologue ===
The book opens with the Israelites in the land that God has promised to them, but worshiping "foreign gods" instead of Yahweh, the God of Israel, and with the Canaanites still present everywhere. Chapters 1:1–2:5 are thus a confession of failure, while chapters 2:6–3:6 are a major summary and reflection from the Deuteronomists.

The opening thus sets out the pattern which the stories in the main text will follow:

1. Israel "does evil in the eyes of Yahweh",
2. The people are given into the hands of their enemies and cry out to Yahweh,
3. Yahweh raises up a leader,
4. The "spirit of Yahweh" comes upon the leader,
5. The leader manages to defeat the enemy, and
6. Peace is regained.

Once peace is regained, Israel does right and receives Yahweh's blessings for a time, but relapses later into doing evil and repeats the pattern above.

Judges follows the Book of Joshua and opens with a reference to Joshua's death. The Cambridge Bible for Schools and Colleges suggests that "the death of Joshua may be regarded as marking the division between the period of conquest and the period of occupation", the latter being the focus of the Book of Judges. The Israelites meet, probably at the sanctuary at Gilgal or at Shechem, and ask the Lord who should be first (in order of time, not of rank) to secure the land they are to occupy.

=== Main text ===
A map of the tribes of Israel

The main text gives accounts of six major judges and their struggles against the oppressive kings of surrounding nations, as well as the story of Abimelech, an Israelite leader (a judge [shofet] in the sense of "chieftain") who oppresses his own people. The cyclical pattern set out in the prologue is readily apparent at the beginning, but as the stories progress it begins to disintegrate, mirroring the disintegration of the world of the Israelites. Although some scholars consider the stories not to be presented in chronological order, the judges in the order in which they appear in the text are:

- Othniel (3:9–11) vs. Cushan-Rishathaim, King of Aram; Israel has 40 years of peace until the death of Othniel. (The statement that Israel has a certain period of peace after each judge is a recurrent theme.)
- Ehud (3:11–29) vs. Eglon of Moab
- Deborah, directing Barak the army captain (4–5), vs. Jabin of Hazor (a city in Canaan) and Sisera, his captain (Battle of Mount Tabor)
- Gideon (6–8) vs. Midian, Amalek, and the "children of the East" (apparently desert tribes)
- Jephthah (11–12:7) vs. the Ammonites
- Samson (13–16) vs. the Philistines

There are also brief glosses on six minor judges: Shamgar (Judges 3:31; after Ehud), Tola and Jair (10:1–5), Ibzan, Elon, and Abdon (12:8–15; after Jephthah). Some scholars have inferred that the minor judges were actual adjudicators, whereas the major judges were leaders and did not actually make legal judgments. The only major judge described as making legal judgments is Deborah (4:4).

=== Epilogue ===
By the end of Judges, Yahweh's treasures are used to make idolatrous images, the Levites become corrupt, the tribe of Dan conquers a remote village instead of the Canaanite cities, and the tribes of Israel make war on the tribe of Benjamin, their own kinsmen. The book concludes with two appendices, stories which do not feature a specific judge:

- Micah's Idol (Judges 17–18), how the tribe of Dan conquers its territory in the north.
- Levite's concubine (Judges 19–21): the gang rape of a Levite's concubine leads to war between the Benjamites and the other Israelite tribes, after which hundreds of virgins are taken captive as wives for the decimated Benjamites.

Despite their appearance at the end of the book, certain characters (like Jonathan, the grandson of Moses) and idioms present in the epilogue show that the events therein "must have taken place... early in the period of the judges."

=== Chronology ===
Judges contains a chronology of its events, assigning a number of years to each interval of judgment and peace. It is overtly schematic and was likely introduced at a later period.

=== Manuscript sources ===
Four of the Dead Sea Scrolls feature parts of Judges: 1QJudg, found in Qumran Cave 1; 4QJudg^{a} and 4QJudg^{b}, found in Qumran Cave 4; and XJudges, a fragment discovered in 2001.

The earliest complete surviving copy of the Book of Judges in Hebrew is in the Aleppo Codex (10th century CE).

The Septuagint (Greek translation) is found in early manuscripts such as the Codex Colberto-Sarravianus (c. AD 400; contains many lacunae) and the Fragment of Leipzig (c. AD 500).

== Composition ==
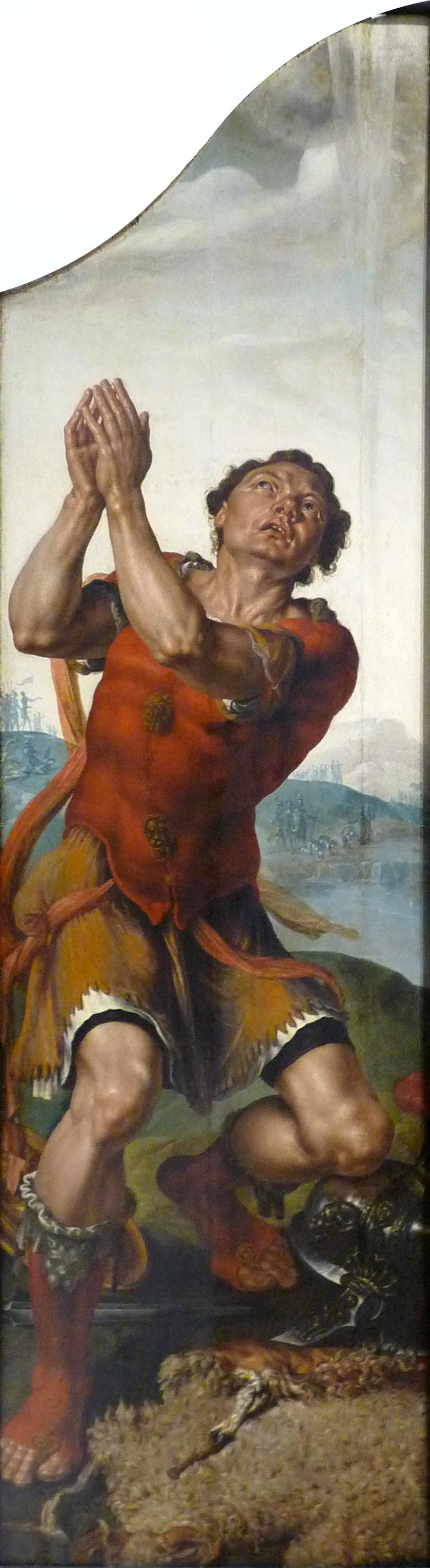
"Gideon thanks God for the miracle of the dew", painting by Maarten van Heemskerck (Musée des Beaux-Arts de Strasbourg)

=== Historicity ===
Scholars are divided on the historicity of Judges: while some view parts of it—like the Song of Deborah—as reflecting genuine memories of pre-monarchic Israel, most critical scholars see it as largely non-historical.

Some scholars doubt whether any of the people named as judges existed, while William G. Dever finds it historically plausible. For Israel Finkelstein, the historical reliability of the Book of Judges cannot be assessed by the possible inclusion of heroic tales from earlier eras because it is impossible to know to what extent those tales are based on authentic memories of local heroes and wars preserved over the centuries in the form of epic poems or popular folktales. Lester Grabbe generally considers the Book of Judges too problematic to use as a historical source for much the same reasons, but acknowledges that an actual historical core can be found in the Judges stories and cannot be ruled out by archeological evidence.

Among anthropologists, few believe in a leap from independent tribes to monarchy. Most accept an intermediate stage of chiefdom as may be reflected in the Book of Judges. These chiefdoms were inter-tribal confederacies temporarily formed for the purpose of war and led by military chief, called a judge. Historian Max Ostrovsky finds the law of ban (herem) a characteristic element of chiefdom-level warfare worldwide, wherever culture reached the level of chiefdom. Similar bans were practiced before the introduction of slavery and empire which are more characteristic of monarchies. Hence the accounts of the Book of Judges may reflect historical reality.

=== Sources ===
The basic source for Judges was a collection of loosely connected stories about tribal heroes who saved the people in battle. This original "book of saviours" made up of the stories of Ehud, Jael and parts of Gideon, had already been enlarged and transformed into "wars of Yahweh" before being given the final Deuteronomistic revision. In the 20th century, the first part of the prologue (chapters 1:1–2:5) and the two parts of the epilogue (17–21) were commonly seen as miscellaneous collections of fragments tacked onto the main text, and the second part of the prologue (2:6–3:6) as an introduction composed expressly for the book.

More recently, this view has been challenged, and there is an increasing willingness to see Judges as the work of a single individual, working by carefully selecting, reworking and positioning the source material to introduce and conclude his themes. Archaeologist Israel Finkelstein proposed that the author(s) of the "book of saviours" collected these folk tales in the time of King Jeroboam II to argue that the king's Nimshide origins, which appear to originate in the eastern Jezreel Valley, were part of the "core" territory of Israel.

=== The Deuteronomistic History ===
A statement repeated throughout the epilogue, "In those days there was no king in Israel" implies a date in the monarchic period for the redaction (editing) of Judges. Twice, this statement is accompanied with the statement "every man did that which was right in his own eyes", implying that the redactor is pro-monarchy, and the epilogue, in which the tribe of Judah is assigned a leadership role, implies that this redaction took place in Judah.

Since the second half of the 20th century most scholars have agreed with Martin Noth's thesis that the books of Deuteronomy, Joshua, Judges, Samuel and Kings form parts of a single work. Noth maintained that the history was written in the early Exilic period (6th century BCE) in order to demonstrate how Israel's history was worked out in accordance with the theology expressed in the book of Deuteronomy (which thus provides the name "Deuteronomistic"). Noth believed that this history was the work of a single author, living in the mid-6th century BCE, selecting, editing and composing from his sources to produce a coherent work. Frank Moore Cross later proposed that an early version of the history was composed in Jerusalem in Josiah's time (late 7th century BCE); this first version, Dtr1, was then revised and expanded to create a second edition, that identified by Noth, and which Cross labelled Dtr2.

Scholars agree that the Deuteronomists' hand can be seen in Judges through the book's cyclical nature: the Israelites fall into idolatry, God punishes them for their sins with oppression by foreign peoples, the Israelites cry out to God for help, and God sends a judge to deliver them from the foreign oppression. After a period of peace, the cycle recurs. Scholars also suggest that the Deuteronomists also included the humorous and sometimes disparaging commentary found in the book such as the story of the tribe of Ephraim who could not pronounce the word "shibboleth" correctly (12:5–6).

== Themes and genre ==
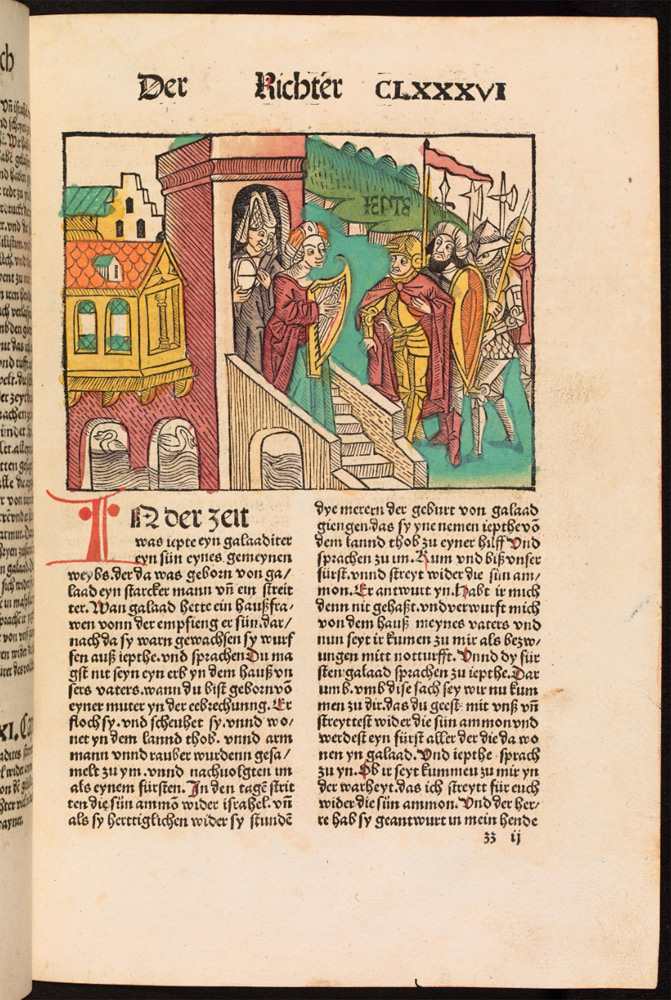
An illustrated page from the Book of Judges in a German Bible, dated 1485 (Bodleian Library)

The essence of Deuteronomistic theology is that Israel has entered into a covenant (a treaty, a binding agreement) with the God Yahweh, under which they agree to accept Yahweh as their God (hence the phrase "God of Israel") and Yahweh promises them a land where they can live in peace and prosperity. Deuteronomy contains the laws by which Israel is to live in the promised land, Joshua chronicles the conquest of Canaan, the promised land, and its allotment among the tribes, Judges describes the settlement of the land, Samuel the consolidation of the land and people under David, and Kings the destruction of kingship and loss of the land. The final tragedy described in Kings is the result of Israel's failure to uphold its part of the covenant: faithfulness to Yahweh brings success, economic, military and political, but unfaithfulness brings defeat and oppression.

This is the theme played out in Judges: the people are unfaithful to Yahweh and He therefore delivers them into the hands of their enemies; the people then repent and entreat Yahweh for mercy, which He sends in the form of a judge; the judge delivers the Israelites from oppression, but after a while they fall into unfaithfulness again and the cycle is repeated. Israel's apostasy is repeatedly invoked by the author as the cause of threats to Israel. The oppression of the Israelites is due to their turning to Canaanite gods, breaking the covenant and "doing evil in the sight of the lord".

Further themes are present: the "sovereign freedom of Yahweh" (God does not always do what is expected of him); the "satirisation of foreign kings" (who consistently underestimate Israel and Yahweh); the concept of the "flawed agent" (judges who are not adequate to the task before them) and the disunity of the Israelite community, which gathers pace as the stories succeed one another.

Scholars have found the book intriguing for what is conspicuously absent: the Ark of the Covenant—given so much importance in the stories of Moses and Joshua—is almost entirely missing; (Note: The ark of the covenant is mentioned in passing in Judges 20:27.) cooperation between the various tribes is limited; there is no mention of a central shrine for worship; and there is only limited reference to a High Priest of Israel—the office to which Aaron was appointed at the end of the Exodus story. (Note: Phinehas the son of Eleazar, the son of Aaron is mentioned in passing in Judges 20:28.)

Although Judges probably had a monarchist redaction (see above), the book contains passages and themes that represent anti-monarchist views. One of the major themes of the book is Yahweh's sovereignty and the importance of being loyal to Him and His laws above all other gods and sovereigns. Indeed, the authority of the judges comes not through prominent dynasties nor through elections or appointments, but rather through the Spirit of God.

Anti-monarchist theology is most apparent toward the end of the Gideon cycle in which the Israelites beg Gideon to create a dynastic monarchy over them and Gideon refuses. The rest of Gideon's lifetime saw peace in the land, but after Gideon's death, his son Abimelech ruled Shechem as a Machiavellian tyrant guilty for much bloodshed (see chapters 8 and 9). However, the last few chapters of Judges (specifically, the stories of Samson, Micah, and Gibeah) highlight the violence and anarchy of decentralized rule.

Judges is remarkable for the number of female characters who "play significant roles, active and passive, in the narratives." Rabbi Joseph Telushkin wrote,

Most of the great women in the Bible either are married to a great man or related to one. ... A rare exception to this tradition is the prophetess and judge Deborah, perhaps the Bible's greatest woman figure. Deborah stands exclusively on her own merits. The only thing we know about her personal life is the name of her husband, Lapidot.

== See also ==
- Biblical canon
- History of ancient Israel and Judah
- Late Bronze Age collapse
- Tanakh

== Bibliography ==
- Alter, Robert (2013). Ancient Israel: The Former Prophets: Joshua, Judges, Samuel, and Kings. New York: W. W. Norton & Co. ISBN 978-0-39324027-6.
- Amit, Yairah (2004). "Judges: Introduction and Annotations". In Berlin, Adele; Brettler, Marc Zvi (eds.). The Jewish Study Bible. New York: Oxford University Press. pp. 508–57.
- Bacon, Gershon; Sperling, S. David (2007). "Judges (Heb. שופטים), Book of". Encyclopaedia Judaica. Vol. 11 (2nd ed.). pp. 561–66.
- Brettler, Marc Zvi (2002). The Book of Judges. Psychology Press. p. 107. ISBN 978-0-415-16216-6.
- Davies, Philip R. (1995). In Search of "Ancient Israel": A Study in Biblical Origins. A&C Black. p. 26. ISBN 978-1-85075-737-5.
- Davis, John J.; Wolf, Herbert (2002). "Judges: Introduction and Annotations". In Barker, Kenneth (ed.). Zondervan NIV Study Bible (revised ed.). Grand Rapids, MI: Zondervan. pp. 326–63.
- Eynikel, Erik (1996). The reform of King Josiah and the composition of the Deuteronomistic history. Brill. ISBN 978-90-04-10266-8.
- Guest, P. Deryn (2003). "Judges". In Dunn, James D. G.; Rogerson, John William (eds.). Commentary on the Bible. Eerdmans. ISBN 978-0-8028-3711-0.
- Hughes, Jeremy (1990). Secrets of the Times: Myth and History in Biblical Chronology. A&C Black. ISBN 978-0-56762930-2.
- Knight, Douglas A (1995). "Deuteronomy and the Deuteronomists". In Mays, James Luther; Petersen, David L.; Richards, Kent Harold (eds.). Old Testament Interpretation. T&T Clark. ISBN 978-0-567-29289-6.
- Knoppers, Gary (2000a). "Introduction". In Knoppers, Gary N.; McConville, J. Gordon (eds.). Reconsidering Israel and Judah: recent studies on the Deuteronomistic history. Eisenbrauns. ISBN 978-1-57506-037-8.
- Knoppers, Gary (2000b). "Is There a Future for the Deuteronomistic History?". In Thomas Romer (ed.). The Future of the Deuteronomistic History. Leuven University Press. ISBN 978-90-429-0858-1.
- Malamat, A. (1971). "Chapter VII: The Period of the Judges". The World History of the Jewish People. Vol. 3. Givatayim, Israel: Rutgers University Press. pp. 129–63.
- Matthews, Victor Harold (2004). Judges and Ruth. Cambridge University Press. ISBN 978-0-521-00066-6.
- Miller, J Maxwell (1995). "The Ancient Near East and Archaeology". In Mays, James Luther; Petersen, David L.; Richards, Kent Harold (eds.). Old Testament Interpretation. T&T Clark. ISBN 978-0-567-29289-6.
- Moore, Megan Bishop; Kelle, Brad E. (2011). Biblical History and Israel's Past. Eerdmans. ISBN 978-0-80286260-0.
- Niditch, Susan (2008). Judges: a commentary. Westminster John Knox Press. ISBN 978-0-664-22096-9.
- Perdue, Leo G (2001). "Preface: The Hebrew Bible in Current Research". In Perdue, Leo G. (ed.). The Blackwell Companion to the Hebrew Bible. Blackwell. ISBN 978-0-631-21071-9.
- De Pury, Albert; Romer, Thomas (2000). "Deuteronomistic Historiography: History of Research and Related Issues". In Albert de Pury; Thomas Romer; Macchi, Jean-Daniel (eds.). Israël constructs its history: Deuteronomistic historiography in recent research. Sheffield Academic Press. ISBN 978-1-84127-099-9.
- Soggin, Alberto (1981). Judges. Westminster John Knox Press. ISBN 978-0-664-22321-2.
- Spieckermann, Hermann (2001). "The Deuteronomistic History". In Perdue, Leo G. (ed.). The Blackwell companion to the Hebrew Bible. Blackwell. ISBN 978-0-631-21071-9.
- Telushkin, Joseph (1997). Biblical Literacy: The Most Important People, Events, and Ideas of the Hebrew Bible. New York: William Morrow & Co.
- Thompson, Thomas L. (1 January 2000). Early History of the Israelite People: From the Written & Archaeological Sources. Brill. p. 96. ISBN 978-90-04-11943-7.
- Van Seters, John (1997). In search of history: historiography in the ancient world and the origins of biblical history. Eisenbrauns. ISBN 978-1-57506013-2.
- Walton, John H. (2009). "The Deuteronomistic History". In Hill, Andrew E.; Walton, John H. (eds.). A Survey of the Old Testament. Zondervan. ISBN 978-0-310-22903-2.

Book of Judges History books
Preceded by Joshua	Hebrew Bible	Succeeded by Samuel
Preceded by Joshua	Christian; Old Testament	Succeeded by Ruth
