= Judges 12 =

Book of Judges, chapter 12

- ← chapter 11 chapter 13 →
- The pages containing the Book of Judges in Leningrad Codex (1008 CE).
- Book: Book of Judges
- Hebrew Bible part: Nevi'im
- Order in the Hebrew part: 2
- Category: Former Prophets
- Christian Bible part: Old Testament (Heptateuch)
- Order in the Christian part: 7

Judges 12 is the twelfth chapter of the Book of Judges in the Old Testament or the Hebrew Bible. According to Jewish tradition the book was attributed to the prophet Samuel, but modern scholars view it as part of the Deuteronomistic History, which spans in the books of Deuteronomy to 2 Kings, attributed to nationalistic and devotedly Yahwistic writers during the time of the reformist Judean king Josiah in 7th century BCE. This chapter records the activities of Biblical judges Jephthah, Ibzan, Elon, and Abdon. belonging to a section comprising Judges 6:1 to 16:31.

== Text ==
This chapter was originally written in Biblical Hebrew. It is divided into 15 verses.

=== Textual witnesses ===
Some early manuscripts containing the text of this chapter in Hebrew are of the Masoretic Text tradition, which includes the Codex Cairensis (895), Aleppo Codex (10th century), and Codex Leningradensis (1008).

Extant ancient manuscripts of a translation into Koine Greek known as the Septuagint (originally was made in the last few centuries BCE) include Codex Vaticanus (B; $\mathfrak{G}$^{B}; 4th century) and Codex Alexandrinus (A; $\mathfrak{G}$^{A}; 5th century). (Note: The whole book of Judges is missing from the extant Codex Sinaiticus.)

== Analysis ==
A linguistic study by Robert B. Chisholm reveals that the central part in the Book of Judges (Judges 3:7–16:31) can be divided into two panels based on the six refrains that state that the Israelites did evil in Yahweh's eyes:

Panel One

A 3:7 ויעשו בני ישראל את הרע בעיני יהוה

And the children of Israel did evil in the sight of the LORD (KJV)
B 3:12 ויספו בני ישראל לעשות הרע בעיני יהוה

And the children of Israel did evil again in the sight of the LORD

B 4:1 ויספו בני ישראל לעשות הרע בעיני יהוה

And the children of Israel did evil again in the sight of the LORD

Panel Two

A 6:1 ויעשו בני ישראל הרע בעיני יהוה

And the children of Israel did evil in the sight of the LORD
B 10:6 ויספו בני ישראל לעשות הרע בעיני יהוה

And the children of Israel did evil again in the sight of the LORD

B 13:1 ויספו בני ישראל לעשות הרע בעיני יהוה

And the children of Israel did evil again in the sight of the LORD

Furthermore from the linguistic evidence, the verbs used to describe the Lord's response to Israel's sin have chiastic patterns and can be grouped to fit the division above:

Panel One

3:8 וימכרם, "and he sold them," from the root מָכַר, makar
3:12 ויחזק, "and he strengthened," from the root חָזַק, khazaq
4:2 וימכרם, "and he sold them," from the root מָכַר, makar

Panel Two

6:1 ויתנם, "and he gave them," from the root נָתַן, nathan
10:7 וימכרם, "and he sold them," from the root מָכַר, makar
13:1 ויתנם, "and he gave them," from the root נָתַן, nathan

This chapter contains the Jephthah's Narrative, which can be divided into 5 episodes, each with a distinct dialogue, as follows:

Episodes in Jephthah's Narrative
Episode	Verses	Dialogue	Verses
A.	10:6–16	Israel and Yahweh	10–15
B. The Ammonite threat	10:17–11:11	The elders and Jephthah	5–11
C.	11:12–28	Jephthah and the Ammonite king	12–28
B'. The Ammonite defeat	11:29–40	Jephthah and his daughter	34–38
A'.	12:1–7	Jephthah and the Ephraimites	1–4a

== Jephthah and the Ephraimites (12:1–7) ==
This section contains the fifth (the final) episode in the Jephthah Narrative. As with Gideon in Judges 8:1–3, the Ephraimites complained that they had not been asked to join in the battle (so they could also enjoy the spoils), but this time it ended in a civil war, in which the Gileadites, unified by Jephthah, had the upperhand. The Gileadites used the pronunciation of the Hebrew word "Shibboleth" to identify the Ephraimites, so they could kill them.

== Ibzan (12:8–10) ==
Ibzan succeeded Jephthah as judge for seven years. He had thirty sons and thirty daughters, and when he died, he was buried in his native town, Bethlehem, which is not followed by "Ephratah" or by "Judah" so it could be the Bethlehem of Galilee in the territory of Zebulun (Joshua 19:15).

== Elon (12:11–12) ==
The tenth judge succeeded Ibzan, Elon, who was given very few statistics and with no historical exploits, other than he was from the tribe of Zebulun, succeeded Ibzan to judge Israel for ten years. When he died, he was buried in Aijalon in the territory of Zebulun.

== Abdon (12:13–15) ==
Abdon succeeded Elon, the son of Hillel of Pirathon of the tribe of Ephraim, who had forty sons and thirty grandsons, and judged Israel for eight years, restoring order in the central area of Israel in the aftermath of the civil war involving Jephthah and the Gileadites.

== See also ==
- Ayalon Valley
- Amalekites
- Ammonites
- Bethlehem
- Israelites
- Gileadites
- Hillel the Elder
- Jordan River
- Pirathon
- Shibboleth
- Tribe of Ephraim
- Tribe of Manasseh
- Tribe of Zebulun
- Related Bible parts: Judges 10, Judges 11

== Sources ==
- Chisholm, Robert B. Jr. (2009). "The Chronology of the Book of Judges: A Linguistic Clue to Solving a Pesky Problem" (PDF). Journal of the Evangelical Theological Society. 52 (2): 247–55. Archived from the original (PDF) on 2022-11-08.
- Coogan, Michael David (2007). Coogan, Michael David; Brettler, Marc Zvi; Newsom, Carol Ann; Perkins, Pheme (eds.). The New Oxford Annotated Bible with the Apocryphal/Deuterocanonical Books: New Revised Standard Version, Issue 48 (Augmented 3rd ed.). Oxford University Press. ISBN 978-0-19-528881-0.
- Halley, Henry H. (1965). Halley's Bible Handbook: an abbreviated Bible commentary (24th (revised) ed.). Zondervan Publishing House. ISBN 0-310-25720-4.
- Hayes, Christine (2015). Introduction to the Bible. Yale University Press. ISBN 978-0-300-18827-1.
- Niditch, Susan (2007). "10. Judges". In Barton, John; Muddiman, John (eds.). The Oxford Bible Commentary (first (paperback) ed.). Oxford University Press. pp. 176–191. ISBN 978-0-19-927718-6.
- Webb, Barry G. (2012). The Book of Judges. New International Commentary on the Old Testament. Eerdmans Publishing Company. ISBN 978-0-8028-2628-2.
- Würthwein, Ernst (1995). The Text of the Old Testament. Translated by Rhodes, Erroll F. Grand Rapids, MI: Wm. B. Eerdmans. ISBN 0-8028-0788-7.
- Younger, K. Lawson (2002). Judges and Ruth. The NIV Application Commentary. Zondervan. ISBN 978-0-310-20636-1.
