= Judges 10 =

Book of Judges, chapter 10

- ← chapter 9 chapter 11 →
- The pages containing the Book of Judges in Leningrad Codex (1008 CE).
- Book: Book of Judges
- Hebrew Bible part: Nevi'im
- Order in the Hebrew part: 2
- Category: Former Prophets
- Christian Bible part: Old Testament (Heptateuch)
- Order in the Christian part: 7

Judges 10 is the tenth chapter of the Book of Judges in the Old Testament or the Hebrew Bible. According to Jewish tradition the book was attributed to the prophet Samuel, but modern scholars view it as part of the Deuteronomistic History, which spans in the books of Deuteronomy to 2 Kings, attributed to nationalistic and devotedly Yahwistic writers during the time of the reformer Judean king Josiah in 7th century BCE. This chapter records the activities of judge Tola and Jair. belonging to a section comprising Judges 6 to 9 and a bigger section of Judges 6:1 to 16:31.

== Text ==
This chapter was originally written in the Hebrew language. It is divided into 18 verses.

=== Textual witnesses ===
Some early manuscripts containing the text of this chapter in Hebrew are of the Masoretic Text tradition, which includes the Codex Cairensis (895), Aleppo Codex (10th century), and Codex Leningradensis (1008).

Extant ancient manuscripts of a translation into Koine Greek known as the Septuagint (originally was made in the last few centuries BCE) include Codex Vaticanus (B; $\mathfrak{G}$^{B}; 4th century) and Codex Alexandrinus (A; $\mathfrak{G}$^{A}; 5th century). (Note: The whole book of Judges is missing from the extant Codex Sinaiticus.)

== Analysis ==
A linguistic study by Chisholm reveals that the central part in the Book of Judges (Judges 3:7–16:31) can be divided into two panels based on the six refrains that state that the Israelites did evil in Yahweh's eyes:

Panel One

A 3:7 ויעשו בני ישראל את הרע בעיני יהוה

And the children of Israel did evil in the sight of the LORD
B 3:12 ויספו בני ישראל לעשות הרע בעיני יהוה

And the children of Israel did evil again in the sight of the LORD

B 4:1 ויספו בני ישראל לעשות הרע בעיני יהוה

And the children of Israel did evil again in the sight of the LORD

Panel Two

A 6:1 ויעשו בני ישראל הרע בעיני יהוה

And the children of Israel did evil in the sight of the LORD
B 10:6 ויספו בני ישראל לעשות הרע בעיני יהוה

And the children of Israel did evil again in the sight of the LORD

B 13:1 ויספו בני ישראל לעשות הרע בעיני יהוה

And the children of Israel did evil again in the sight of the LORD

Furthermore from the linguistic evidence, the verbs used to describe the Lord's response to Israel's sin have chiastic patterns and can be grouped to fit the division above:

Panel One

3:8 וימכרם, "and he sold them," from the root מָכַר, makar
3:12 ויחזק, "and he strengthened," from the root חָזַק, khazaq
4:2 וימכרם, "and he sold them," from the root מָכַר, makar

Panel Two

6:1 ויתנם, "and he gave them," from the root נָתַן, nathan
10:7 וימכרם, "and he sold them," from the root מָכַר, makar
13:1 ויתנם, "and he gave them," from the root נָתַן, nathan

Verse 6 of chapter 10 starts a section of Jephthah's Narrative, which can be divided into 5 episodes, each with a distinct dialogue, as follows:

Episodes in Jephthah's Narrative
Episode	Verses	Dialogue	Verses
A.	10:6–16	Israel and Yahweh	10–15
B. The Ammonite threat	10:17–11:11	The elders and Jephthah	5–11
C.	11:12–28	Jephthah and the Ammonite king	12–28
B'. The Ammonite defeat	11:29–40	Jephthah and his daughter	34–38
A'.	12:1–7	Jephthah and the Ephraimites	1–4a

== Tola (10:1–2) ==
The judge Tola (and also the next one, Jair) has only an abbreviated notes of probably a larger tradition that might be well-known in the past (cf. Othniel in Judges 3:7–11 and Samgar in 3:31).

=== Verse 1 ===
And after Abimelech there arose to defend Israel Tola the son of Puah, the son of Dodo, a man of Issachar; and he dwelt in Shamir in mount Ephraim.

- "Tola": in Hebrew literally means a "worm" or "crimson" color, as the color of the kermes dye produced from an insect, Kermes vermilio. His genealogy lists "Puah" as his father, "Dodo" as his grandfather, and "Issachar" as his tribal ancestor, whose children were Tola, Puvah (or "Puah" in Numbers 26:23; 1 Chronicles 7:1), Yob, and Shimron (Genesis 46:13 ESV). Not only the names Tola and his father, Puah, are the same as the first two sons of Issachar, his city of origin "Shamir" (sh-m-y-r) is similar to the name of the fourth son of Issachar, "Shimron" (sh-m-r-n), or could actually be named after "Shimron".
- "Puah": the name is associated in Midrash ha-Gadol with that of a 'plant (madder) used to make dyes'.
- "Shamir": means "hard stone", e.g., flint or diamond (Ezekiel 3:9). The Talmud applied the name "shamir" to a mythical worm which was quite powerful to cut through stone, so it was used by King Solomon to build the First Temple in Jerusalem. The name shares the same three consonants in Hebrew as "Samaria" and is on the same locality "on Mount Ephraim", so it is perhaps the older name of Samaria.

=== Verse 2 ===
And he judged Israel twenty-three years. Then he died and was buried at Shamir.

- "Judged": Tola was said in verse 1 to have "saved" (Hebrew: yšʻ) Israel, without any military action, "dwelt" or "lived" (Hebrew: yšb; also means "sitting" or "presiding") and in this verse to have "judged" (Hebrew: špt) for 23 years. The combination of words, especially the last two which are also used for Deborah, indicates that Tola was a leader without being a military one. He probably saved Israel from the disastrous effect of Abimelech's brief rule by bringing stability to the administration of the land.

== Jair (10:3–5) ==
Jair of Gilead judged Israel after the crisis that Tola faced had passed, because the reference to his wealth (that he had "thirty sons that rode on thirty ass colts, and they had thirty cities…"; cf. Judges 12:9–14) indicates a time of peace and prosperity, with no preparation for the incoming invasion of the Ammonites that would follow at the end of 22 years of his rule. The 30 cities in the land of Gilead seems to be related with those in the Bashan (cf. 1 Kings 4:13). The notice of the cities suggests what interesting offer Gilead could give to a new leader who would fight for them and why Jephthah would find it attractive. Jair was buried in Camon (Qamon), identified as modern Qamm 4 kilometres (2.5 mi) north of Tayyiba in northern Galilee.

== Israel oppressed again (10:6–18) ==
This section opens the Jephthah Narrative with a 'conventionalized pattern'—death of judge, backsliding, cry for help— and resumes with a review Israel's major enemies, In the specific dialogue between the Israelites and YHWH (verses 10–16) Israel confessed her sins of idolatry, then YHWH described his previous saving actions against Israel's unfaithfulness (cf. Hosea 7:11–16), and Israel repented (cf. similar pattern of motifs in Ezra 9, Nehemiah 9, and 2 Chronicles 20; by contrition of people and leaders 2 Chronicles 20:12; 16:8; 12:6–7), so YHWH took pity upon Israel (cf. Exodus 2:23–25) and would send a rescuer.

=== Verse 7 ===
And the anger of the Lord was hot against Israel, and he sold them into the hands of the Philistines, and into the hands of the children of Ammon.

- "Philistines": The oppression of the Philistines apparently started simultaneously with that of the Ammonites, indicating that the Jephthah Narrative parallels to the Samson Narrative (Judges 13–16).

== See also ==
- Abimelech
- Amalekite
- Amorites
- Astaroth
- Baalim
- Children of Israel
- Havoth-Jair
- Jordan River
- Mizpeh
- Moab (Chemosh
- Philistines
- Sidon (Eshmun)
- Syria (Atargatis)
- Tribe of Benjamin
- Tribe of Ephraim
- Tribe of Issachar
- Tribe of Judah
- Related Bible parts: Judges 9, Judges 11

== Sources ==
- Chisholm, Robert B. Jr. (2009). "The Chronology of the Book of Judges: A Linguistic Clue to Solving a Pesky Problem" (PDF). Journal of the Evangelical Theological Society. 52 (2): 247–55. Archived from the original (PDF) on 2022-11-08.
- Coogan, Michael David (2007). Coogan, Michael David; Brettler, Marc Zvi; Newsom, Carol Ann; Perkins, Pheme (eds.). The New Oxford Annotated Bible with the Apocryphal/Deuterocanonical Books: New Revised Standard Version, Issue 48 (Augmented 3rd ed.). Oxford University Press. ISBN 978-0-19-528881-0.
- Halley, Henry H. (1965). Halley's Bible Handbook: an abbreviated Bible commentary (24th (revised) ed.). Zondervan Publishing House. ISBN 0-310-25720-4.
- Hayes, Christine (2015). Introduction to the Bible. Yale University Press. ISBN 978-0-300-18827-1.
- Niditch, Susan (2007). "10. Judges". In Barton, John; Muddiman, John (eds.). The Oxford Bible Commentary (first (paperback) ed.). Oxford University Press. pp. 176–191. ISBN 978-0-19-927718-6.
- Webb, Barry G. (2012). The Book of Judges. New International Commentary on the Old Testament. Eerdmans Publishing Company. ISBN 978-0-8028-2628-2.
- Würthwein, Ernst (1995). The Text of the Old Testament. Translated by Rhodes, Erroll F. Grand Rapids, MI: Wm. B. Eerdmans. ISBN 0-8028-0788-7.
- Younger, K. Lawson (2002). Judges and Ruth. The NIV Application Commentary. Zondervan. ISBN 978-0-310-20636-1.
