= Ramoth-Gilead =

Ancient city in the Transjordan

Coordinates: 32°30′N 36°01′E

Ramoth-Gilead (Hebrew: רָ(א)מֹת (בַּ)גִּלְעָד, romanized: Rā(ʾ)mōṯ (ba)Gilʿāḏ meaning "Heights of Gilead"), was a Levitical city and city of refuge east of the Jordan River in the Hebrew Bible, also called "Ramoth in Gilead" (Deuteronomy 4:43; Joshua 20:8; Joshua 21:38) or "Ramoth Galaad" in the Douay–Rheims Bible. It was located in the tribal territorial allotment of the tribe of Gad.

== Biblical events ==
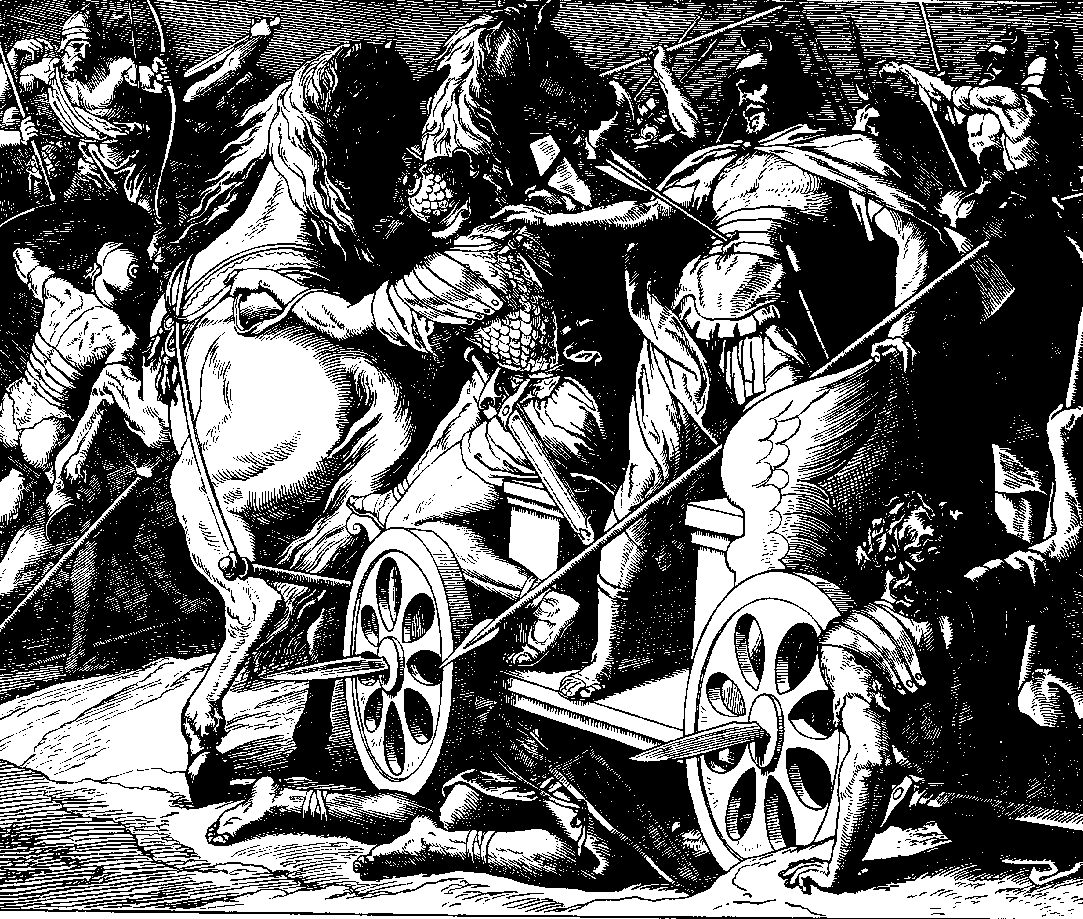
Death of Ahab, from Die Bibel in Bildern

According to (1 Kings 4:13), Ramoth-Gilead was the base of Ben-Geber, one of King Solomon's regional governors. He was responsible for ("to him belonged") the towns of Jair the son of Manasseh, in Gilead and the region of Argob in Bashan: sixty large cities with walls and bronze gate-bars.

It appears to have been lost to Syria (Aram-Damascus) during the battles between the northern kingdom of Israel and Syria, as Ahab, King of Israel, proposed to go to battle to win it back. After consulting prophets about the prospects of success, Ahab went to fight for Ramoth in Gilead, aided by Jehoshaphat, King of Judah. During the battle, Ahab was wounded by an arrow. He was propped up in his chariot facing the enemy, but by evening Ahab had bled to death and the Syrians won the battle.

Later, an incident occurred when Ahaziah and Joram fought against Hazael, king of Aram-Damascus, and Joram was wounded (2 Kings 8:28).

Also in this city, Elisha, the prophet of God told one of the sons of the prophets to anoint Jehu, Joram's commander, king over Israel (2 Kings 9:1–6).

The British Bible scholar, Hugh J. Schonfield theorized that the location of Armageddon, mentioned only in the New Testament, at (Revelation 16:16), is a Greek garbling of a supposed late Aramaic name for Ramoth-Gilead; that this location, having anciently belonged to the Hebrew tribe of Gad, was, in New Testament times, part of the Greek region known as the Decapolis, it was (Schonfield theorized) known as Rama-Gad-Yavan (Yavan meaning Greek), which when translated into Greek became Armageddon (much as Ramathaim was translated to Aramathea).

== Location ==
It has been tentatively identified with Reimun, on the northern slope of the Zarqa River, about 5 miles (8.0 km) west of Jerash or Gerasa, one of the cities of the Decapolis.

Other possible locations include:

1. Tell er-Rumeith, about 3 miles south of ar-Ramtha, Jordan
2. as-Salt.
