= Sebastia, Nablus =

Palestinian village and ancient location

Sebastia
- Municipality type B

Arabic transcription(s)
  - Arabic: سبسطية
  - Latin: Sabastiya; Sabastia; Sebaste (unofficial)
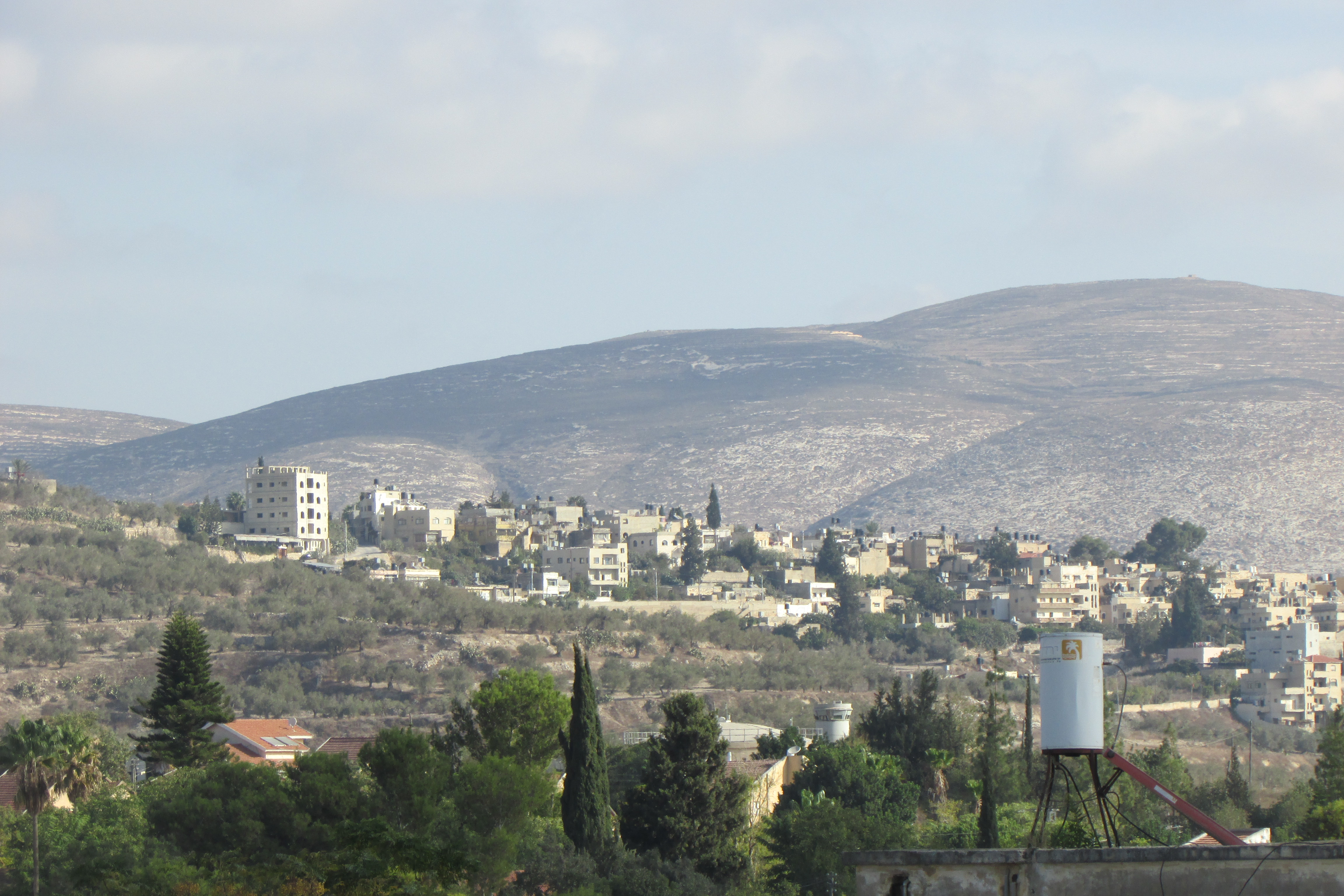
- View of Sebastia, 2016

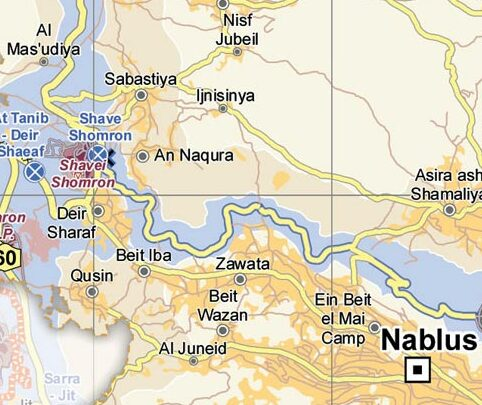
- Sabastiya in the 2018 OCHA OpT map; the archeological site of Samaria is located immediately east of the built up area

- Location of Sebastia within the West Bank Location of Sebastia within Palestine
- Coordinates: 32°16′36″N 35°11′45″E
- Palestine grid: 168/186
- State: State of Palestine
- Governorate: Nablus

Government
  - Type: Municipality (from 1997)
  - Head of Municipality: Ma’amun Harun Kayed

Area
  - Total: 4.8 km^{2} (1.9 sq mi)

Population (2017)
  - Total: 3,205
  - Density: 670/km^{2} (1,700/sq mi)

UNESCO World Heritage Site
- Criteria: Cultural: iii
- Reference: 1809
- Inscription: 2026 (48th Session)
- Endangered: 2026–present
- Area: 79 ha
- Buffer zone: 63 ha

Sebastia (Arabic: سبسطية, Sabastiyah; Greek: Σεβαστή, Σεβάστεια, romanized: Sevasti, Sevasteia; Hebrew: סבסטיה, Sebastiya; Latin: Sebaste) is a Palestinian village of about 3,205 inhabitants, located in the Nablus Governorate of the State of Palestine, some 12 kilometers northwest of the city of Nablus.

Sebastia is believed to be one of the oldest continuously inhabited places in the West Bank. In the 9th century BCE, it was known as Samaria, and served as the capital city of the northern Kingdom of Israel until it was destroyed by the Neo-Assyrian Empire around 720 BCE. It became an administrative center under Assyrian, Babylonian and Persian rule. During the early Roman period, the city was expanded and fortified by Herod the Great, who renamed it Sebastia in honor of emperor Augustus. Since the middle of the 4th century, the town has been identified by Christians and Muslims as the burial site of John the Baptist, whose purported grave is today part of Nabi Yahya Mosque. Conquered by Muslims in the 7th century, the present-day village of Sebastia is home to a number of important archaeological sites.

== Etymology ==
In ancient times, the city of Sebastia was known as Shomron (Hebrew: שֹׁמְרוֹן, romanized: Šōmrôn) which derives from the Hebrew term שֹׁמֵר šōmēr meaning "watchman". The city bearing the ancient Hebrew name of Shomron later gave its name to the central region of the Land of Israel surrounding the city of Shechem (modern-day Nablus). In Greek, Shomron became known as Samaria.

According to first-century historian Josephus, Herod the Great renamed the city Sebastia in honor of the Roman emperor Augustus. The Greek sebastos, "venerable", is a translation of the Latin epithet augustus. The modern village name preserves the Roman-period name of Sebaste.

== History and archaeology ==
Between 880-723/22 BCE, Samaria was the capital of the northern Israelite kingdom of Israel, also known as Samaria after its long-time capital. Under the four centuries long Mesopotamian rule (723/22-322 BCE), it reached a golden age, which was again the case under King Herod (r. 37-4 BCE).

On the tell (archaeological mound), archaeologists uncovered various larger structures and smaller finds such as pottery sherds, from the first settlement, dating to the Early Bronze Age, from the Israelite Iron Age city, and the Hellenistic, Roman, and Byzantine periods. At the modern village site of Sebastiyeh near the tell, pottery findings were dated to the Late Roman and Byzantine periods, but also to the Early Muslim, medieval (Crusader, Ayyubid, etc.), Ottoman and modern periods.

=== Kingdom of Israel/Samaria ===
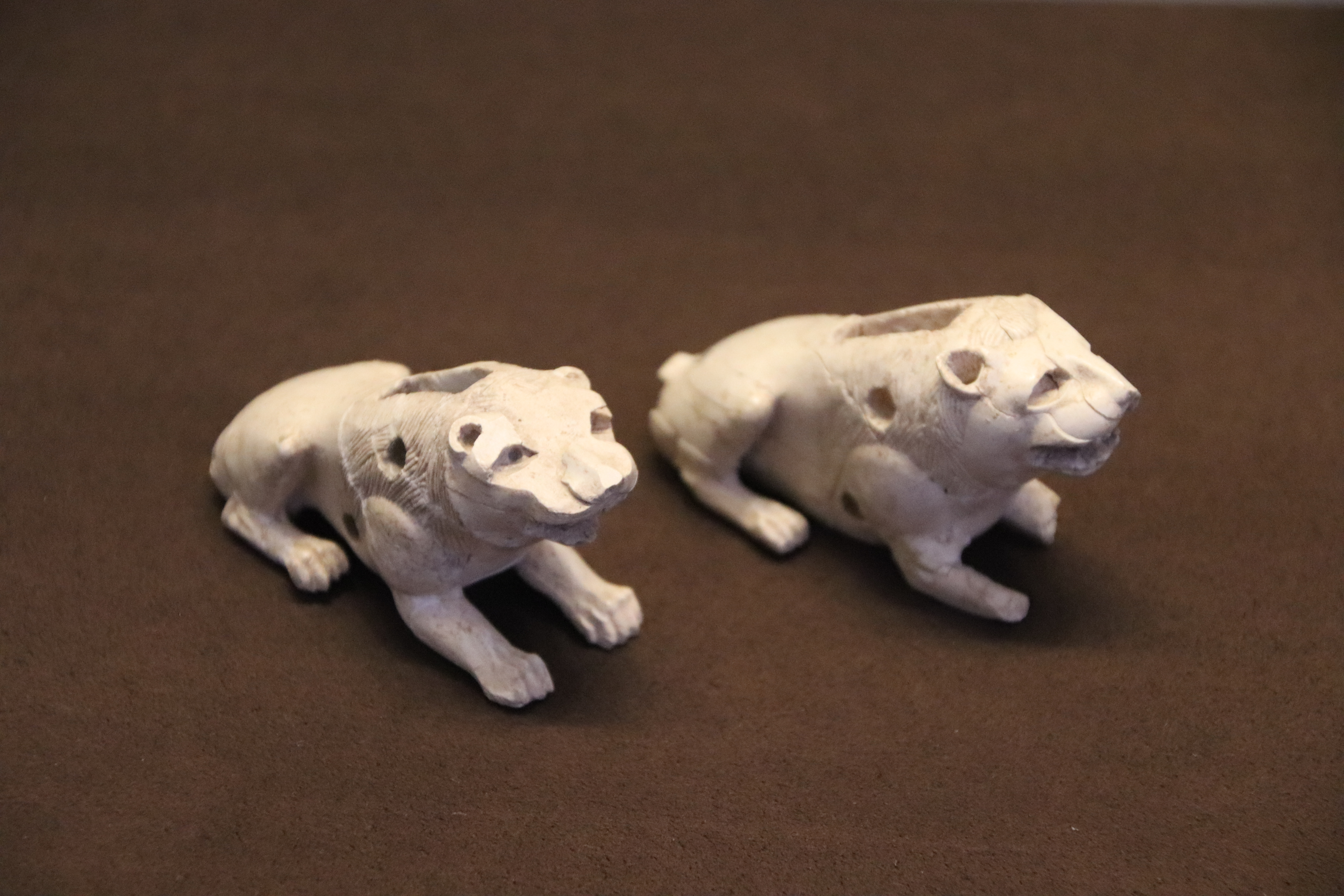
Carved ivory pieces unearthed in ancient Samaria, Israel Museum

In the 9th and the 8th centuries BCE, Samaria was capital of the northern Kingdom of Israel. According to the Hebrew Bible, Omri, the sixth king of Israel (ruled 880s–870s BCE), purchased a hill owned by an individual (or clan) named Shemer for two talents of silver, and built its new capital on its broad summit, replacing Tirzah, Israel's second capital (1 Kings 16:24).

According to some biblical scholars, the earliest reference to a settlement at this location may be the town of Shamir, which according to the Hebrew Bible was the home of the judge Tola in the 12th century BC (Judges 10:1–2).

Omri is thought to have granted the Arameans the right to "make streets in Samaria" as a sign of submission (1 Kings 20:34). This probably meant permission was granted to the Aramean merchants to carry on their trade in the city. This would imply the existence of a considerable Aramean population, who called it Shamerain.

In 720 BCE, Samaria fell to the Neo-Assyrian Empire following a three-year siege, bringing an end to the Kingdom of Israel. After the fall of the kingdom, Samaria became an administrative center under Neo-Assyrian, Neo-Babylonian, and Achaemenid (Persian) rule.

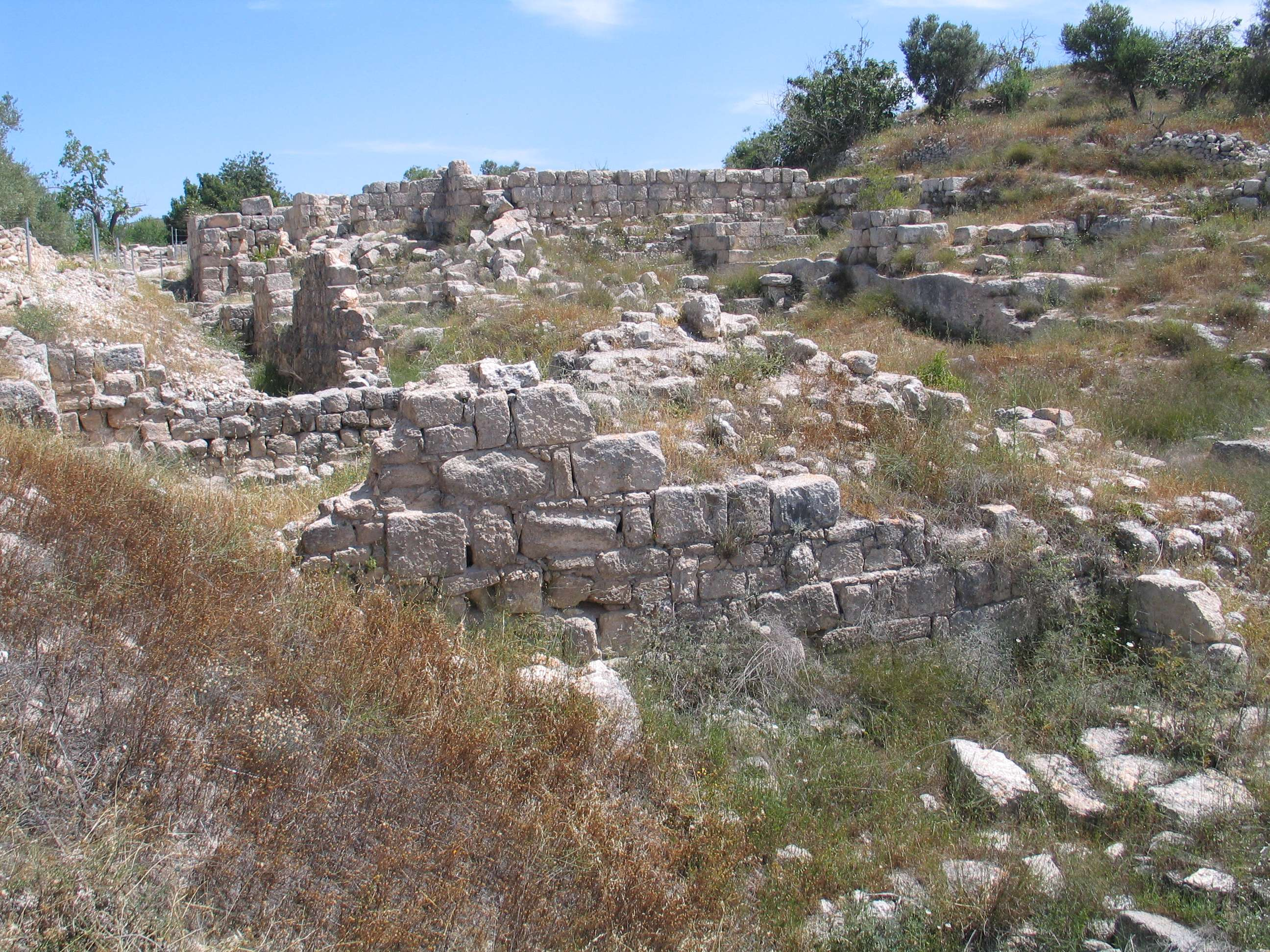
Ruins of the royal palace in Sebastia

Many important archeological discoveries were made at Ancient Samaria. These included a royal Israelite palace dating from the 9th and 8th centuries BCE. 500 pieces of carved ivory were found there, which led some scholars to identify the structure with the "palace adorned with ivory" mentioned in the Bible (1 Kings 22:39).

The Samaria Ostraca, a collection of 102 ostraca written in the Paleo-Hebrew alphabet were unearthed by George Andrew Reisner of the Harvard Museum of the Ancient Near East.

=== Hellenistic period ===
Samaria (Shomron) was conquered by Alexander the Great in 331 BCE. Curtius reports that Alexander destroyed the city and expelled its Samaritan inhabitants after Andromachus, the governor of Syria was lynched there. The city was re-established as a Macedonian military colony. The Wadi Daliyeh papyri are documents that are believed to have belonged to the Samaritans who were exiled by Alexander, who took refuge in caves in this wadi (valley), where many of them later died. It was following the conquest of Alexander that the name of the city was Hellenized, becoming Samaria.

During the Wars of the Diadochi, Samaria, at the time primarily a fort settled by Macedonians, was again destroyed according to Josephus, citing Polybius. This was done by Ptolemy I Soter when he was forced to surrender the site to Antigonus I Monophthalmus, who only held it briefly before it returned to Ptolemaic rule. The city was again rebuilt and populated from this point forward primarily by Macedonians and Hellenized Syro-Phoenicians.

=== Maccabean period ===
Beginning in 113 BCE, Jewish High Priest John Hyrcanus began an extensive military campaign against Samaria. Hyrcanus placed his sons Antigonus and Aristobulus in charge of the siege of Samaria. The Samaritans called for help and eventually received 6,000 troops from Antiochus IX Cyzicenus. Although the siege lasted for a long, difficult year, Hyrcanus did not give up. Ultimately Samaria was overrun and devastated. The inhabitants of Samaria were enslaved. Upon conquering former Seleucid regions Hyrcanus implemented a policy of compelling the non-Jewish populations to adopt Jewish customs.

=== Roman period ===
After Pompey rebuilt the town in the year 63 BCE, Hellenized Samaritans and the descendants of Macedonian soldiers inhabited the city.

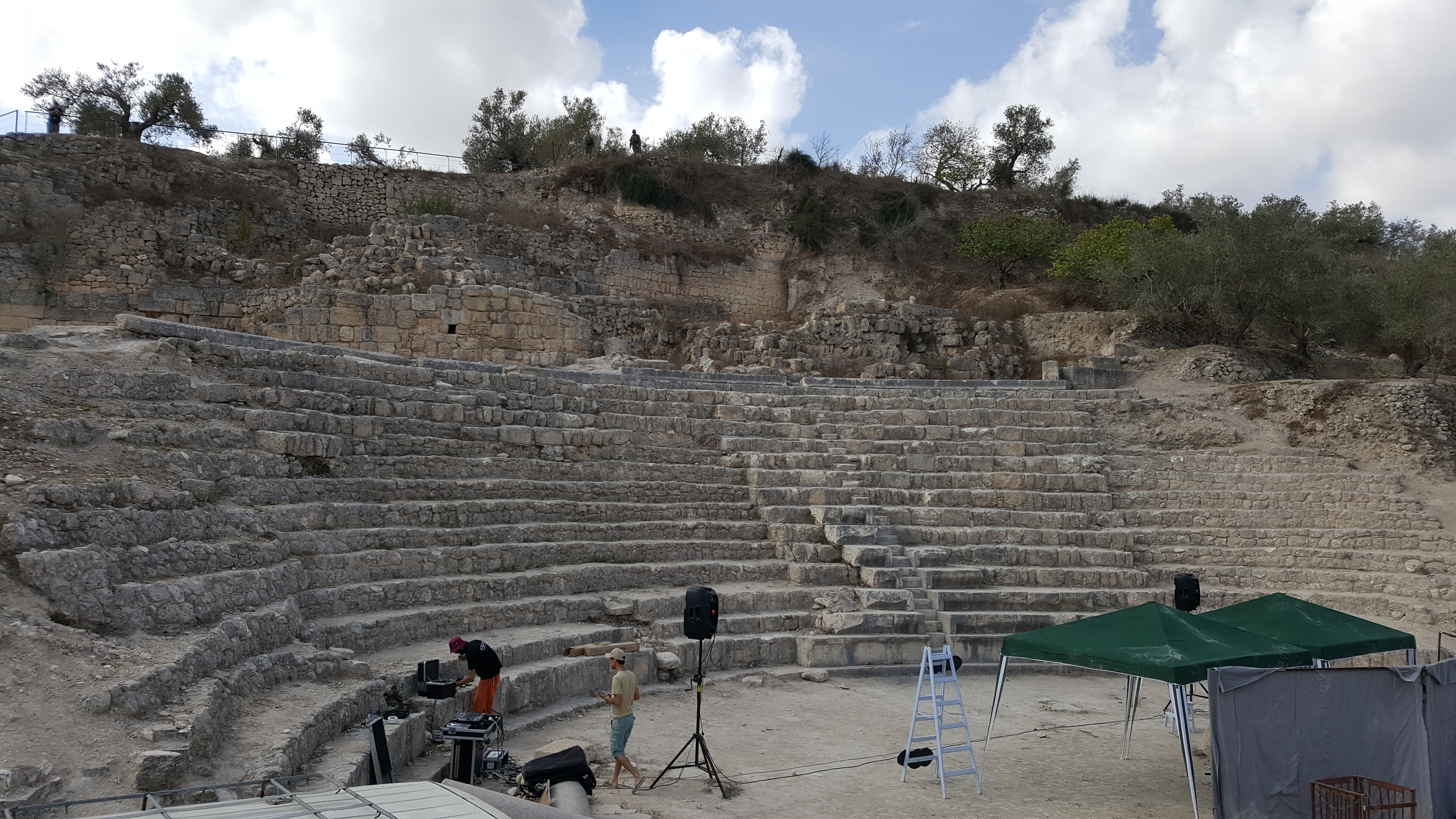
The Roman theatre at Sebastia

The Roman emperor Augustus granted Samaria to Herod the Great, the Roman client king of Judea, following the defeat of Anthony and Cleopatra. Herod built the city anew in 27 BCE and named it "Sebastia" in honour of the emperor. Herod built two temples in the city: one, dedicated to Augustus, was constructed on an elevated platform in the city's acropolis; it was probably influenced by the Forum of Caesar in Rome. The second temple was dedicated to Kore. A large stadium was also built at the city, which was settled with 6000 veteran colonists, probably non-Jews who fought alongside Herod and helped him secure the throne. Later, in 7 BCE and after a trial at Berytus, Herod had his sons Alexander and Aristobulus IV transported to Sebastia and executed by being strangled for treason.

Theodosius II locates the execution of John the Baptist by Herod at Sebastia, while Josephus writes it took place in Machaerus east of the Jordan River. Early Christian tradition held that his body was interred in Sebastia, alongside the prophets Elisha and Obadiah, and a cult around him and the tomb had formed before the 4th century BCE. Philostorgius and Rufinus recall that Julian the Apostate (361–363) gave orders to burn the relics of the prophets in Sebastia, and that the ashes were recovered by monks from Jerusalem. A church was built at the site of the tomb, containing what remained of them, and was visited by Egeria in 384.

Sebastia was also made the site of bishopric by the time of Council of Chalcedon in 451, and was a dependency of the archbishop of Caesarea. John Rufus described the church and its martyrium in 512, writing that Elisha and John the Baptist were interred in "two caskets covered in gold and silver, in front of which lamps are always burning." The church and martyrium were still standing when Saint Willibald visited the site in 723, but by 808 the church was reported to have "fallen to the ground" leaving behind only the tomb, likely as a result of the 749 Galilee earthquake. A depiction of the church survives in the Umm ar-Rasas mosaics at the Church of St. Stephen in Umm ar-Rasas.

=== Medieval period ===
Sebastia was the seat of a bishop in the Crusader Kingdom of Jerusalem. It is mentioned in the writings of Yaqut al-Hamawi (1179–1229), the Syrian geographer, who situates it as part of the military district of Filastin in the province of Syria, located two days from that city, in the Nablus District. He also writes, "There are here the tombs of Zakariyyah and Yahya, his son, and of many other prophets and holy men."

Saladin came to Sebastia during his expedition to central Palestine in 1184. Sebastia's bishop then released eighty Muslim captives to ensure the town's safety.

Niccolò da Poggibonsi, an Italian monk who visited Sebaste in 1347, wrote that the town was in ruins, and that only "some Saracens and a few Samaritans" lived there.

=== Ottoman period ===
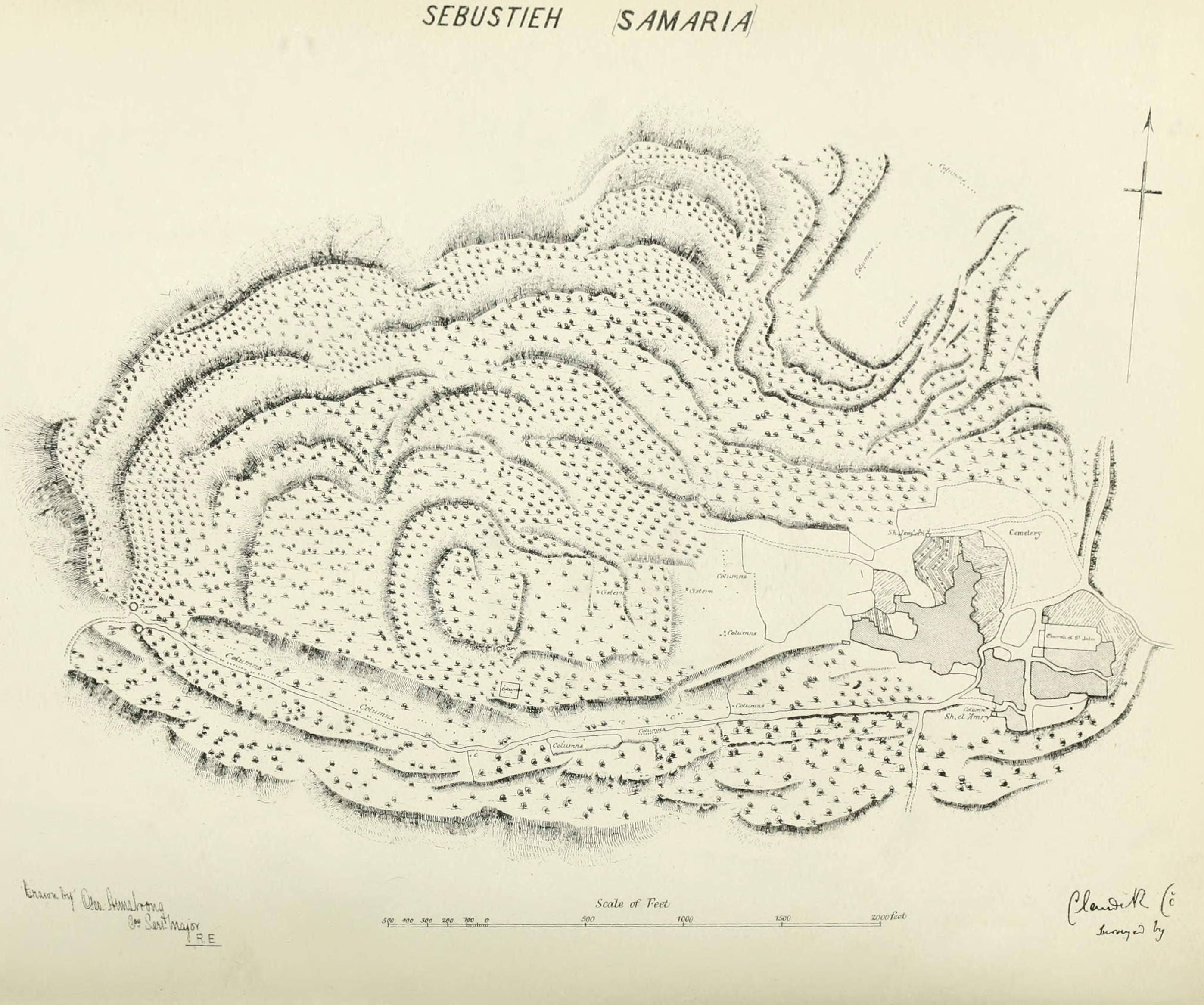
Sebastia from the 1871–77 PEF Survey of Palestine

Sebastia was incorporated into the Ottoman Empire in 1517 with all of Palestine, and in 1596 it appeared in the tax registers as being in the Nahiya of Jabal Sami, part of Sanjak Nablus. It had a population of 20 households and 3 bachelors, all Muslim. The villagers paid taxes on wheat, barley, summer crops, olive trees, occasional revenues, goats and/or beehives; a total of 5,500 akçe.

Accordiong to the French explorer Victor Guérin, Sebastia had less than a thousand inhabitants when he visited the village in 1870. In 1870/1871 (1288 AH), an Ottoman census listed the village in the nahiya (sub-district) of Wadi al-Sha'ir.

In 1882, the PEF's Survey of Western Palestine described Sebastia as "A large and flourishing village, of stone and mud houses, on the hill of the ancient Samaria. The position is a very fine one; the hill rises some 400 to 500 feet above the open valley on the north, and is isolated on all sides but the east, where a narrow saddle exists some 200 feet lower than the top of the hill. There is a flat plateau on the top, on the east end of which the village stands, the plateau extending westwards for over half a mile. A higher knoll rises from the plateau, west of the village, from which a fine view is obtained as far as the Mediterranean Sea. The whole hill consists of soft soil, and is terraced to the very top. On the north it is bare and white, with steep slopes, and a few olives; a sort of recess exists on this side, which is all plough-land, in which stand the lower columns. On the south a beautiful olive-grove, rising in terrace above terrace, completely covers the sides of the hill, and a small extent of open terraced-land, for growing barley, exists towards the west and at the top. The village itself is ill-built, and modern, with ruins of the crusader Cathedral of Saint John towards the northwest.

Two disused railway stations next to Sebastia in 1942

A sarcophagus lies by the road on the north-east, but no rock-cut tombs have as yet been noticed on the hill, though possibly hidden beneath the present plough-land. There is a large cemetery of rock-cut tombs to the north, on the other side of the valley. The neighbourhood of Samaria is well supplied with water. In the months of July and August a stream was found (in 1872) in the valley south of the hill, coming from the spring (Ain Harun), which has a good supply of drinkable water, and a conduit leading from it to a small ruined mill. Vegetable gardens exist below the spring. To the east is a second spring called 'Ain Kefr Ruma, and the valley here also flows with water during part of the year, other springs existing further up it. The threshing-floors of the village are on the plateau north-west of the houses. The inhabitants are somewhat turbulent in character, and appear to be rich, possessing very good lands. There is a Greek Bishop, who is, however, non-resident; the majority of the inhabitants are Moslems, but some are Greek Christians."

Between 1915 and 1938, Sebastia was served by two stations on the Afula–Nablus–Tulkarm branch line of the Jezreel Valley railway: Mas'udiya station at the three-way junction, around 1.5 km to the west of the village, and Sabastiya station, around 1.5 km to the south.

The site was first excavated by the Harvard Expedition, initially directed by Gottlieb Schumacher in 1908 and then by George Andrew Reisner in 1909 and 1910; with the assistance of architect C.S. Fisher and D.G. Lyon.

=== British Mandate period ===
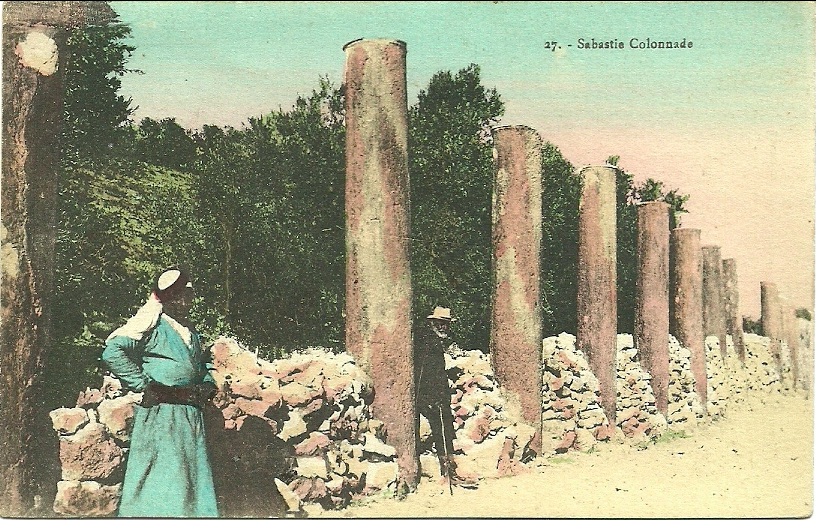
Sebastia columns, postcard from ca 1925 by Karimeh Abbud

In the 1922 census of Palestine, conducted by the British Mandate authorities, Sabastia had a population of 572; 10 Christians and 562 Muslim. This had increased in the 1931 census to 753; 2 Jews, 20 Christians and 731 Muslim, in a total of 191 houses.

In the 1945 statistics Sebastia had a population of 1,020; 980 Muslims and 40 Christians, with 5,066 dunams of land, according to an official land and population survey. Of this, 1,284 dunams were plantations and irrigable land, 3,493 used for cereals, while 90 dunams were built-up land.

The second expedition was known as the Joint Expedition, a consortium of 5 institutions directed by John Winter Crowfoot between 1931 and 1935; with the assistance of Kathleen Mary Kenyon, Eliezer Sukenik and G.M. Crowfoot. The leading institutions were the British School of Archaeology in Jerusalem, the Palestine Exploration Fund, and the Hebrew University. In the 1960s small scale excavations directed by Fawzi Zayadine were carried out on behalf of the Department of Antiquities of Jordan.

=== Jordanian period ===
In the wake of the 1948 Arab–Israeli War, and after the 1949 Armistice Agreements, Sebastia came under Jordanian rule. In 1961, the population was 1,345.

=== Post-1967 ===
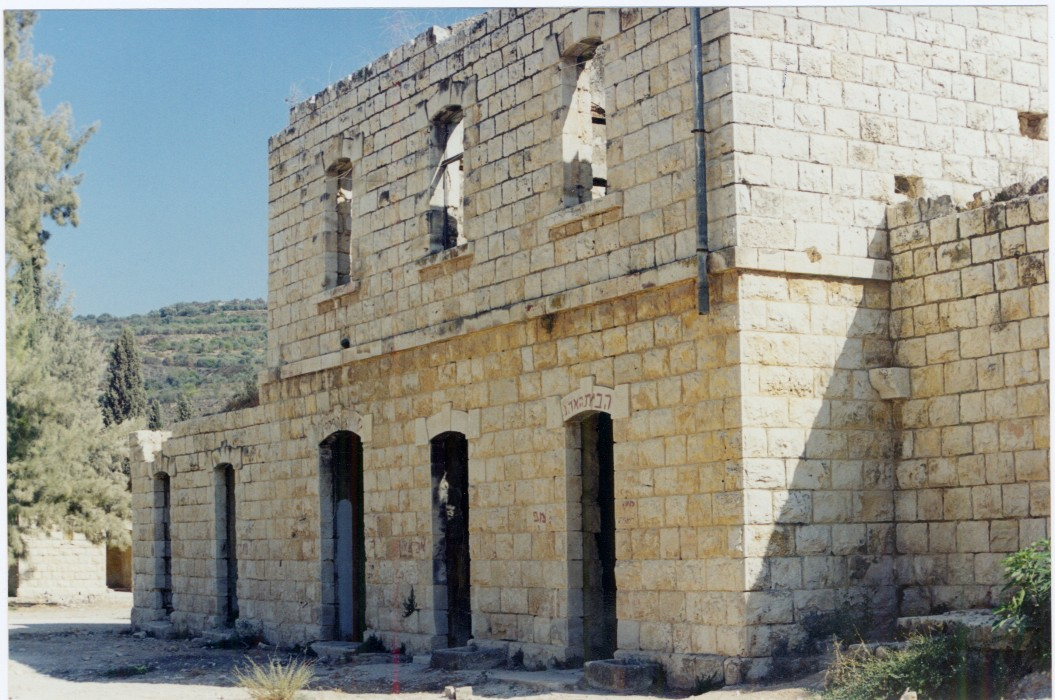
Remains of the railway station at Mas'udiya, 2002

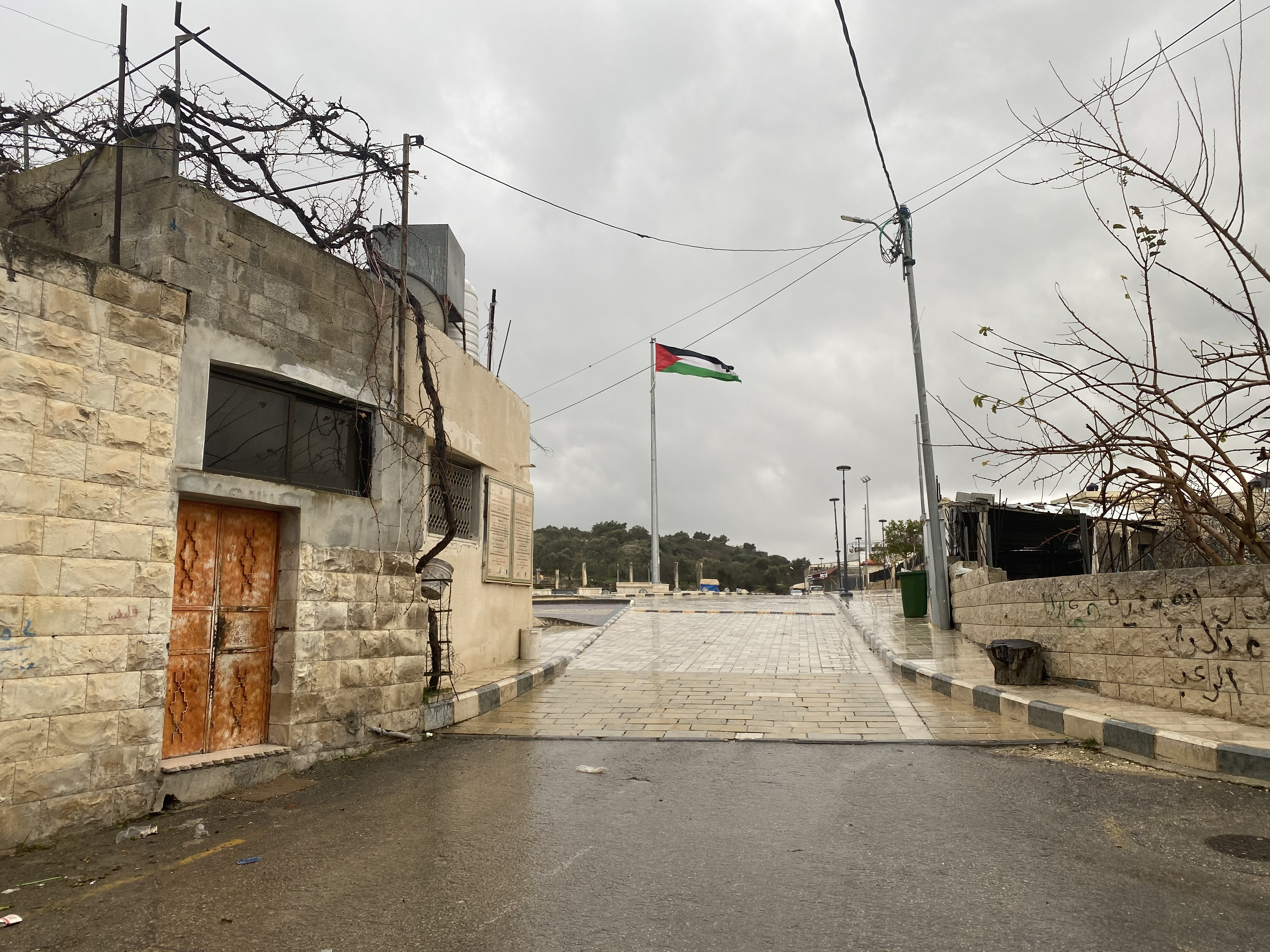
Palestine flag waves near the entrance of Tel Sebastia, 2022

Since the Six-Day War in 1967, Sebastia has been held under Israeli military occupation, while the Palestinian Authority is the civil authority of the area.

In modern-day Sebastia, the village's main mosque, known as the Nabi Yahya Mosque, stands within the remains of a Crusader cathedral that is believed to be built upon the tombs of the prophets Elisha, Obediah and John the Baptist beside the public square. There are also Roman royal tombs, and a few medieval and many Ottoman era buildings which survive in a good state of preservation. Jordanian archaeologists had also restored the Roman theater near the town.

In late 1976, the Israeli settlers movement, Gush Emunim, attempted to establish a settlement at the Ottoman train station. The Israeli government did not approve and the group that was removed from the site would later found the settlement of Elon Moreh adjacent to Nablus.

The ancient site of Sebastia is located just above the built-up area of the modern day village on the eastern slope of the hill. In July 2023, 19-year-old Fawzi Makhalfeh was killed by Israeli soldiers at the village, to what the Palestinian Authority described as an execution, and residents described as an act of terrorism.

In 2024, the Israeli military occupied the site, wounding villagers and illegally seizing land at the summit of the tell and the town square in the process. According to residents, the Israeli military has increased incursions, arrests, and violent seizure of land at the site since October 7, 2023. In August 2024, the Israeli military briefly seized the village, an act described as a routine occurrence by residents. In November 2025, Israel announced plans to expropriate 1,800 dunams (1.8 km^{2}; 0.69 sq mi) of land around the archaeological site making it the largest archaeological site expropriated in the West Bank. The Israeli government said the move was to protect the site from looting; heritage organisation Emek Shaveh said that "The site itself is under Israeli both security and civilian control, which means that had they wanted to, the staff officer for archaeology could have allocated resources, personnel in order to oversee that the site was well taken care of, to keep away looters and so forth". The Palestinian Authority said the expropriation was a way of furthering annexation of the West Bank.

In 2026, Sebastia was designated by UNESCO as a World Heritage Site and immediately classified as endangered.

== Demography ==
Some of Sebastia's residents trace their origins to Azzun Atma and the vicinity of Jerusalem.

== Ecclesiastical see ==
The Archdiocese of Sebastia is part of the Greek Orthodox Patriarchate of Jerusalem. Theodosios (Hanna) has been the see's archbishop since 2005.

== See also ==
- Cities of the ancient Near East
- Short chronology timeline
- List of modern names for biblical place names

== Bibliography ==
- Anon (1908). "Excavations at Samaria". Harvard Theological Review. 1 (4). London: 518–519. doi:10.1017/s001781600000674x. S2CID 193255908.
- Barron, J.B., ed. (1923). Palestine: Report and General Abstracts of the Census of 1922. Government of Palestine.
- Conder, C.R.; Kitchener, H.H. (1882). The Survey of Western Palestine: Memoirs of the Topography, Orography, Hydrography, and Archaeology. Vol. 2. London: Committee of the Palestine Exploration Fund.
- Dauphin, C. (1998). La Palestine byzantine, Peuplement et Populations. BAR International Series 726 (in French). Vol. III : Catalogue. Oxford: Archeopress. ISBN 0-860549-05-4.
- Government of Jordan, Department of Statistics (1964). First Census of Population and Housing. Volume I: Final Tables; General Characteristics of the Population (PDF).
- Government of Palestine, Department of Statistics (1945). Village Statistics, April, 1945.
- Guérin, V. (1875). Description Géographique Historique et Archéologique de la Palestine (in French). Vol. 2: Samarie, pt. 2. Paris: L'Imprimerie Nationale.
- Hadawi, S. (1970). Village Statistics of 1945: A Classification of Land and Area ownership in Palestine. Palestine Liberation Organization Research Center.
- Hütteroth, W.-D.; Abdulfattah, K. (1977). Historical Geography of Palestine, Transjordan and Southern Syria in the Late 16th Century. Erlanger Geographische Arbeiten, Sonderband 5. Erlangen, Germany: Vorstand der Fränkischen Geographischen Gesellschaft. ISBN 3-920405-41-2.
- Le Strange, G. (1890). Palestine Under the Moslems: A Description of Syria and the Holy Land from A.D. 650 to 1500. London: Committee of the Palestine Exploration Fund.
- Mills, E., ed. (1932). Census of Palestine 1931. Population of Villages, Towns and Administrative Areas. Jerusalem: Government of Palestine.
- Palmer, E.H. (1881). The Survey of Western Palestine: Arabic and English Name Lists Collected During the Survey by Lieutenants Conder and Kitchener, R. E. Transliterated and Explained by E.H. Palmer. Committee of the Palestine Exploration Fund.
- Pringle, D. (1998). The Churches of the Crusader Kingdom of Jerusalem: L-Z (excluding Tyre). Vol. II. Cambridge University Press. ISBN 0-521-39037-0.
- Reisner, G.A. (1910). "The Harvard Expedition to Samaria Excavations of 1909". Harvard Theological Review. 3 (2). London: 248–263. doi:10.1017/s0017816000006027. S2CID 163234112.
- Zertal, A. (2004). The Manasseh Hill Country Survey. Vol. 1. Boston: BRILL. ISBN 9004137564.
