= Judges 11 =

Book of Judges, chapter 11

- ← chapter 10 chapter 12 →
- The pages containing the Book of Judges in Leningrad Codex (1008 CE).
- Book: Book of Judges
- Hebrew Bible part: Nevi'im
- Order in the Hebrew part: 2
- Category: Former Prophets
- Christian Bible part: Old Testament (Heptateuch)
- Order in the Christian part: 7

Judges 11 is the eleventh chapter of the Book of Judges in the Old Testament or the Hebrew Bible. According to Jewish tradition the book was attributed to the prophet Samuel, but modern scholars view it as part of the Deuteronomistic History, which spans in the books of Deuteronomy to 2 Kings, attributed to nationalistic and devotedly Yahwistic writers during the time of the reformer Judean king Josiah in 7th century BCE. This chapter records the activities of judge Jephthah. belonging to a section comprising Judges 6:1 to 16:31.

== Text ==
This chapter was originally written in the Hebrew language. It is divided into 40 verses.

=== Textual witnesses ===
Some early manuscripts containing the text of this chapter in Hebrew are of the Masoretic Text tradition, which includes the Codex Cairensis (895), Aleppo Codex (10th century), and Codex Leningradensis (1008).

Extant ancient manuscripts of a translation into Koine Greek known as the Septuagint (originally was made in the last few centuries BCE) include Codex Vaticanus (B; $\mathfrak{G}$^{B}; 4th century) and Codex Alexandrinus (A; $\mathfrak{G}$^{A}; 5th century). (Note: The whole book of Judges is missing from the extant Codex Sinaiticus.)

== Analysis ==
A linguistic study by Chisholm reveals that the central part in the Book of Judges (Judges 3:7–16:31) can be divided into two panels based on the six refrains that state that the Israelites did evil in Yahweh's eyes:

Panel One

A 3:7 ויעשו בני ישראל את הרע בעיני יהוה

And the children of Israel did evil in the sight of the LORD (KJV)
B 3:12 ויספו בני ישראל לעשות הרע בעיני יהוה

And the children of Israel did evil again in the sight of the LORD

B 4:1 ויספו בני ישראל לעשות הרע בעיני יהוה

And the children of Israel did evil again in the sight of the LORD

Panel Two

A 6:1 ויעשו בני ישראל הרע בעיני יהוה

And the children of Israel did evil in the sight of the LORD
B 10:6 ויספו בני ישראל לעשות הרע בעיני יהוה

And the children of Israel did evil again in the sight of the LORD

B 13:1 ויספו בני ישראל לעשות הרע בעיני יהוה

And the children of Israel did evil again in the sight of the LORD

Furthermore from the linguistic evidence, the verbs used to describe the Lord's response to Israel's sin have chiastic patterns and can be grouped to fit the division above:

Panel One

3:8 וימכרם, "and he sold them," from the root מָכַר, makar
3:12 ויחזק, "and he strengthened," from the root חָזַק, khazaq
4:2 וימכרם, "and he sold them," from the root מָכַר, makar

Panel Two

6:1 ויתנם, "and he gave them," from the root נָתַן, nathan
10:7 וימכרם, "and he sold them," from the root מָכַר, makar
13:1 ויתנם, "and he gave them," from the root נָתַן, nathan

This chapter contains the Jephthah's Narrative, which can be divided into 5 episodes, each with a distinct dialogue, as follows:

Episodes in Jephthah's Narrative
Episode	Verses	Dialogue	Verses
A.	10:6–16	Israel and Yahweh	10–15
B. The Ammonite threat	10:17–11:11	The elders and Jephthah	5–11
C.	11:12–28	Jephthah and the Ammonite king	12–28
B'. The Ammonite defeat	11:29–40	Jephthah and his daughter	34–38
A'.	12:1–7	Jephthah and the Ephraimites	1–4a

== Jephthah and the elders of Gilead (11:1–11) ==
The Jephthah Narrative has a pattern of traditional story about the success of the once marginalized hero who rises to power in a 'non-dynastic' society with 'fluid patterns of leadership'. The hero, Jephthah, was a son of a prostitute, denied rights of inheritance by his father's legitimate children, then became a 'social bandit' chief and gained the military prowess to lead and save his nation. Faced with an imminent Ammonite threat, the leaders of Gilead tried to woo back Jephthah, whom they had marginalized, by offering him the position of "commander", but when he balked they had to increase the offer to the position of "head" ("chieftain"). The agreement between Jephthah and the elders was sealed in a covenant with YHWH as witness (verse 10).

There is a parallel structure of the dialogue between YHWH and the Israelites in Judges 10:10–16 and the dialogue between Jephthah and the elders of Gilead in Judges 11:4-11.

YHWH and the Israelites (10:10-16)	Jephthah and the elders (11:4-11)
The Ammonite oppression (10:7–9)	The Ammonite oppression (11:4)
Israel appeals to Yahweh (10:10)	Gilead appeals to Jephthah (11:5-6)
Yahweh retorts sarcastically (10:11-14)	Jephthah retorts sarcastically (11:7)
Israel repeats the appeal (10:15-16)	Gilead repeats the appeal (11:8)
Yahweh refuses to be used (10:16b)	Jephthah seizes the moment opportunistically (11:9-11)

=== Verse 1 ===
Now Jephthah the Gileadite was a mighty man of valour, and he was the son of an harlot: and Gilead begat Jephthah.

- "Mighty man of valour": or "mighty warrior" (ESV), a term that was applied in the Hebrew Bible, among others, to Gideon (Judges 6:12) and David (1 Samuel 16:18). This is exactly the kind of person that was needed and sought by the elders of Gilead to save them from the threat of the enemy (Judges 10:18), although his status as a "son of an harlot" (or "prostitute" in ESV) and being expelled by his father's other sons explains why the elders did not come to him right away to seek help.

== Jephthah's diplomacy with the Ammonite king (11:12–28) ==
The concept of 'just war' was the main subject of the exchange between Jephthah and the king of the Ammonites, arguing about land rights using 'juridical language' (cf. formula in 2 Chronicles 35:21; 2 Kings 3:13; 1 Kings 17:18). Jephthah demands to know what justifies the Ammonites' invasion against Israel, and the Ammonite king responds by providing a version of events recorded in Numbers 21:21–31 (cf. Deuteronomy 2:26–35), but painted Israel as the unjust aggressor. In a lengthy response, Jephthah gave a pro-Israelite version of the taking of the disputed territory using three arguments:

1. Israel took the land in a defensive war, because Sihon, king of Heshbon, did not allow Israel to pass peacefully through his territory during the Exodus (verses 15–22).
2. YHWH, God of the Israelites, has given this land to his people with an allusion to Balak, king of Moab (verse 25) who seemed to accept that Israel was granted certain lands (see Numbers 22–24, esp. 24:25; also Numbers 21:10-20 (verses 23–25);
3. Israel had possessed the disputed territory for 300 years, so that the 'statute of limitations' on land claims was now over (verses 26–28).

Unsurprisingly the Ammonite king rejected Jephthah's arguments, because in an 'enfeebled state' (Judges 10:8–9) Israel should not have power to negotiate, but Jephthah had been willing to give diplomacy a chance before the war and showed himself as the leader of Israel.

== Jephthah's vow (11:29–40) ==
This section contains the fourth part of the Jephthah Narrative recording Jephthah's victory over the Ammonites, which is overshadowed by his ill-considered vow, and a special dialogue between Jephthah and his daughter in verses 34–38. In other ancient Near-Eastern cultures, the warriors often promise the deity something of value in return for his assistance in war, a particular belief in the efficacy of sacrifice in the ideology of the "ban" (Hebrew: herem), which leads to the consecration of valuable commodities after victory (cf. Numbers 21:2–3; the terminology at Deuteronomy 13:16). However, in this case, Jephthah's vow is considered rash and manipulative:

1. It is manipulative (Jephthah's character as noted in previous sections) with the intention of getting YHWH to perform. Ironically, it demonstrates Jephthah's folly and faithlessness to YHWH's power to fulfill His word.
2. It is rash and imprudent because it adds, unprecedentedly in Hebrew Bible, "whatever comes out of the door of my house" to the proper good intention of a common burnt offering (as listed in Torah) to YHWH after victory.

The narrative frames the vow (verses 30–31) within the records of battles and victory over the Ammonites in verses 29 and 32 to show that Jephthah's vow is totally unnecessary, as his last words to the Ammonite king should be sufficient, "Let the Lord, the Judge, decide the dispute this day between the Israelites and the Ammonites" (verse 27), that YHWH would deliver the Ammonites to Jephthah's hands just as YHWH delivered Sihon to the Israelites (verse 21). Despite the understandable reluctance of Jephthah and his daughter (verses 37–38), both decided to carry out the vow (verse 39). The obedience of Jephthah's daughter is remembered and noted in a corresponding structure in verses 37–40 as follows:

Verses 37–39a	Verses 39a–40
two months	yearly, four days per year
she went (Hebrew: hlk)	the daughters of Israel went (Hebrew: hlk)
her companions	the daughters of Israel
bewail (Hebrew: bkh)	commemorate (Hebrew: tnh)

== See also ==
- Ammonites
- Amorites
- Arnon
- Aroer
- Balak
- Chemosh
- Children of Israel
- Edom
- Egypt
- Gilead
- Heshbon
- Jabbok
- Jahaz
- Jephtah's Daughter: A Biblical Tragedy
- Jordan River
- Minnith
- Mizpah in Benjamin
- Mizpah in Gilead
- Moab
- Red Sea
- Sihon
- Red Sea
- Spirit of the YHWH
- Tob
- Tribe of Manasseh
- Zippor
- Related Bible parts: Judges 9, Judges 10, Judges 12, Judges 21, Hebrews 11

== Sources ==
- Chisholm, Robert B. Jr. (2009). "The Chronology of the Book of Judges: A Linguistic Clue to Solving a Pesky Problem" (PDF). Journal of the Evangelical Theological Society. 52 (2): 247–55. Archived from the original (PDF) on 2022-11-08.
- Coogan, Michael David (2007). Coogan, Michael David; Brettler, Marc Zvi; Newsom, Carol Ann; Perkins, Pheme (eds.). The New Oxford Annotated Bible with the Apocryphal/Deuterocanonical Books: New Revised Standard Version, Issue 48 (Augmented 3rd ed.). Oxford University Press. ISBN 978-0-19-528881-0.
- Halley, Henry H. (1965). Halley's Bible Handbook: an abbreviated Bible commentary (24th (revised) ed.). Zondervan Publishing House. ISBN 0-310-25720-4.
- Hayes, Christine (2015). Introduction to the Bible. Yale University Press. ISBN 978-0-300-18827-1.
- Niditch, Susan (2007). "10. Judges". In Barton, John; Muddiman, John (eds.). The Oxford Bible Commentary (first (paperback) ed.). Oxford University Press. pp. 176–191. ISBN 978-0-19-927718-6.
- Webb, Barry G. (2012). The Book of Judges. New International Commentary on the Old Testament. Eerdmans Publishing Company. ISBN 978-0-8028-2628-2.
- Würthwein, Ernst (1995). The Text of the Old Testament. Translated by Rhodes, Erroll F. Grand Rapids, MI: Wm. B. Eerdmans. ISBN 0-8028-0788-7.
- Younger, K. Lawson (2002). Judges and Ruth. The NIV Application Commentary. Zondervan. ISBN 978-0-310-20636-1.
