= Jephtah's Daughter: A Biblical Tragedy =

- Written by: Reverend Madison C. Peters (scenario)
- Starring: Annette Kellerman
- Production company: Vitagraph Company
- Distributed by: Vitagraph Company
- Release date: May 22, 1909
- Running time: 184 meters or 605 feet
- Country: United States
- Language: Silent

Jephtah's Daughter: A Biblical Tragedy is a 1909 American silent short film starring Annette Kellerman. The National Film and Television Archive of the British Film Institute holds a print of this film.

== See also ==
- Judges 11
