= Nabi Yahya Mosque =

Mosque in Nablus, West Bank

Nabi Yahya Mosque Mosque of the Prophet John
- Jāmiʿ An-Nabī Yaḥyā (جَامِع ٱلنَّبِي يَحْيَىٰ)
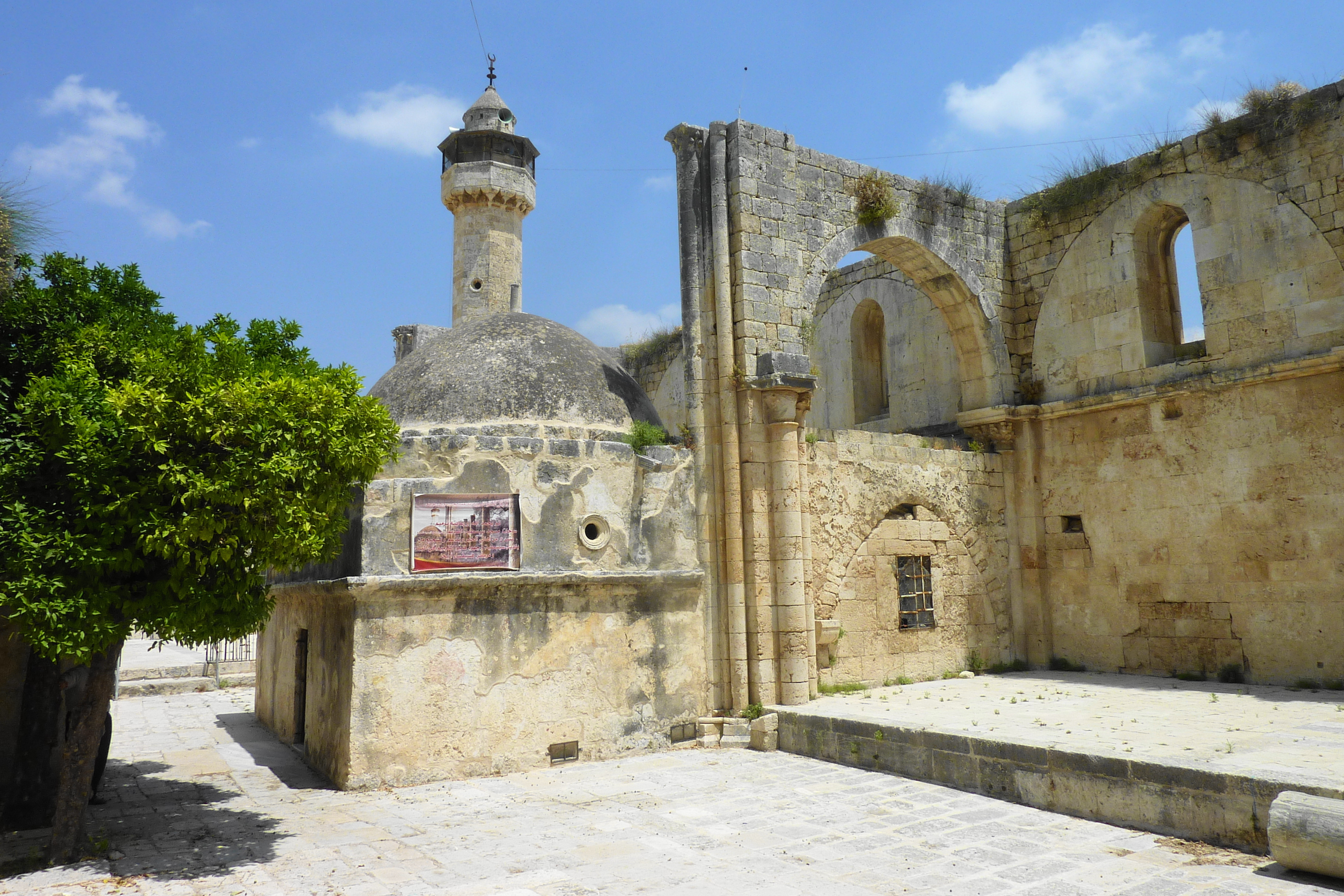

- Location of the mosque in the West Bank Nabi Yahya Mosque (Middle East) Nabi Yahya Mosque (West and Central Asia)

Religion
- Affiliation: Islam

Location
- Location: Nablus, West Bank, Palestine
- Coordinates: 32°16′36″N 35°11′45″E

Architecture
- Type: Mosque
- Completed: 1261

Specifications
- Dome: 1
- Minaret: 1
- Minaret height: 30 meters (98 ft)

The Nabi Yahya Mosque (Arabic: جَامِع ٱلنَّبِي يَحْيَىٰ, romanized: Jāmiʿ An-Nabī Yaḥyā, lit. 'Mosque of the Prophet John') is a mosque containing the traditional tomb of Yahya (John the Baptist) in Sebastia, Nablus. The mosque also reputedly contains the tombs of the prophets Elisha and Obadiah. This mosque was originally a church.

Nabi Yahya is the main mosque in the Palestinian village of Sebastia, located in the central square. It is constructed of large buttressed walls and within its courtyard a stairway in the small domed building leads down into a cave.

== History ==
=== Byzantine church ===
The Nabi Yahya Mosque stands on the site identified since Byzantine times as the place where John the Baptist's body was buried by his followers. Matthew 14:12 records that "his disciples came and took away [John's] body and buried it". A church was erected on the spot of the tomb during the Byzantine era.

=== Crusader cathedral ===
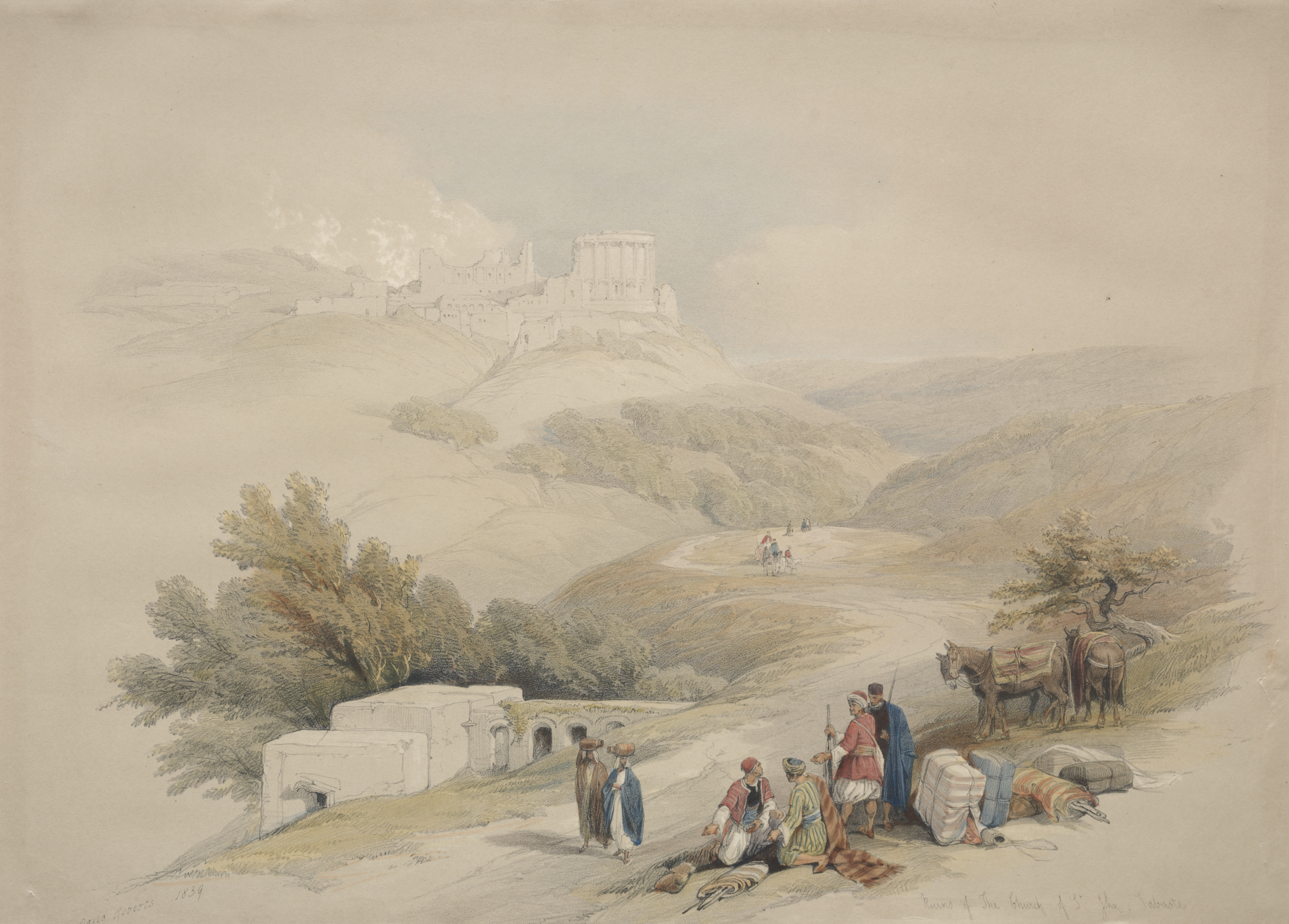
The ruins of the crusader cathedral in the 1840s, from The Holy Land, Syria, Idumea, Arabia, Egypt, and Nubia.

The church erected above John the Baptist's tomb was superseded by a Crusader-built church in 1160. It was transformed into a mosque by Saladin in 1187, although some sources say it was converted by the Mamluks in 1261. Nabi Yahya refers to John the Baptist in the Arabic language of Muslims, while Christians and Jews call him yūḥannā.

In 1870, the French explorer Victor Guérin visited the place, and noted:

At the western extremity of the monument rises a Musulman sanctuary crowned by a little cupola pierced with narrow windows, which admit a feeble light into the crypt which it covers. This crypt probably belongs to the ancient basilica, which was replaced by the edifice now itself in ruins. Descent is managed by a staircase of fifteen steps; then, after crossing a landing once closed by a monolithic door, you go down two steps, and find yourself in a crypt formerly paved with small slabs of marble in different colours, forming a sort of mosaic. Here lies the door of which I have just spoken: mouldings divide it into compartments; it is provided with hinges worked in the thickness of the block which composes the stone. This crypt, of small extent, contains a sepulchral chamber divided into three parallel arched loculi, with cut stones regularly worked between them. They are only seen by introducing a light across three small openings in the wall of the chamber. According to an ancient tradition, one of these compartments is the tomb of St. John the Baptist, and the others those of the prophets Obadiah and Elisha.

— Guérin, 1875

Later, in the 1870s, the Palestine Exploration Fund excavated the place, which it described in its Survey of Western Palestine as "a mere shell, the greater part of the roof and aisle piers gone, and over the crypt a modern kubbeh has been built. The interior length is 158 feet, the breadth 74 feet; the west wall is 10 feet thick, the north wall 8 feet, the south wall 4 feet. There were six bays, of which the second from the east is larger, probably once supporting a dome. On the east are three apses to nave and aisles, the central apse is 30 feet in diameter, equal to the width of the nave. The piers had four columns attached, one each side; on the west was a doorway and two windows; on the south four windows remain, and on the north three."

=== Ottoman rebuilding ===
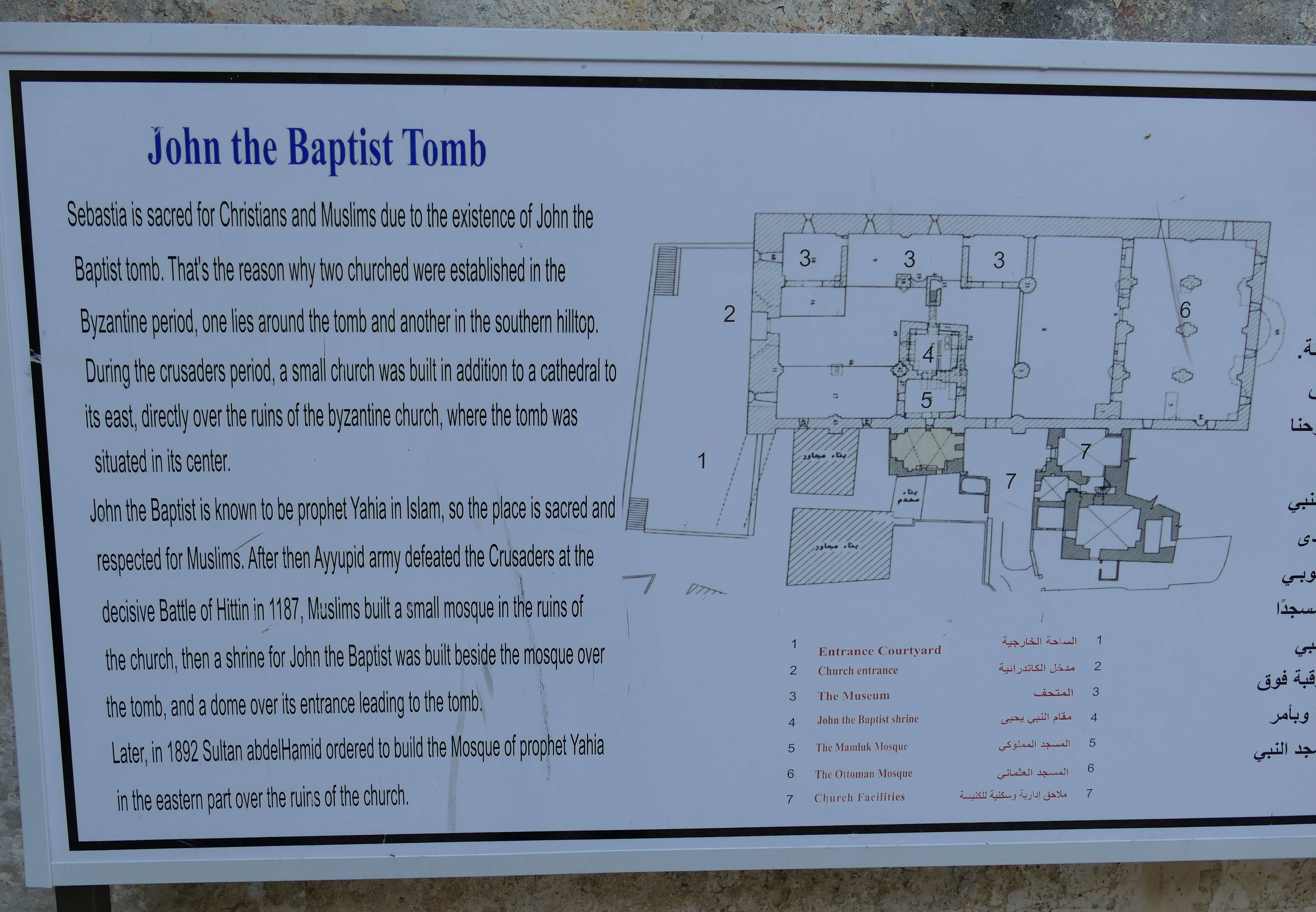
A sign in the mosque, 2018

In 1892, Abdul Hamid II ordered the rebuilding of part of the site. The mosque was restored and mostly rebuilt during the 19th century while Palestine was under Ottoman rule.

== Prison of John the Baptist ==
Local tradition in both the Christian and Muslim communities of the area notes that Sebastia also contained the site of the prison of John the Baptist and is the place where he was beheaded; however this was a separate church in the old city and is a claim refuted by the account of the first century historian Josephus, which recorded the site of the beheading as Machaerus, across the Jordan, some 80–90 miles (130–140 km) away.

== See also ==
- List of mosques in Palestine
- Islam in Palestine
