= Abel-cheramim =

Abel-cheramim (אָבֵל כְּרָמִים 'ʾāḇēl kǝrāmīm' [ʔɔːˈveːl kərɔːˈmiːm]) was a village of the Ammonites, east of Jordan. Jephthah, the judge, victoriously pursued the Ammonites as far as this village. Also referred to as Abel-keramin. The only reference to this location in the Hebrew Bible is Judges 11:33. The name means "meadow of the vineyards" or "plain of the vineyards".
