= Pirathon =

Pirathon was an ancient town mentioned in the Hebrew Bible. Its exact whereabouts are not known. The Hebrew name agrees closely with that of modern Fara'ata (Israelite grid 165177), seven miles WSW of Shechem, leading to common identification of the two, though Conder and Kitchener claim that the earliest reference to the name "Fera'ata" dates to the 14th century. They also state that the Samaritan Chronicle (dated by them to the 12th century) refers to the town as Ophrah, though the Chronicle (ch. 41) identifies Fer'ata as west of Shechem. Its tribal affiliation with Ephraim in Judges 12:15 has been questioned on the grounds that Fara'ata lies north of the main course of Wadi Qana, which formed the southern border of Manasseh (Josh 17:7–10). However, the Wadi Qana this far east has divided in to numerous tributaries. The village sits on a prominent hill, and the valley to its north and west drains into the Wadi Qana, so it might well have been reckoned to Ephraim.

Brenton translates as Pharathon (Greek: Φαραθών) in his version of the Septuagint.

The town is notable as the home of Hillel, father of Abdon, one of the judges of early Israel (Judges 12:13–15), and because Benaiah, one of King David's captains (or "mighty ones"), originated there (2 Samuel 23:30).
