= Elon (Judges) =

One of the Judges of Israel

- אֵילֹון
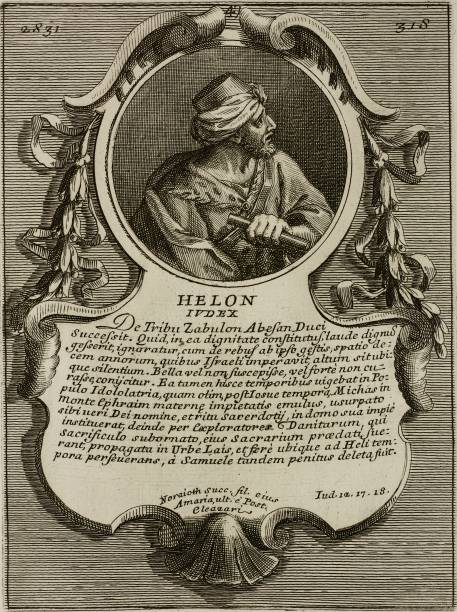
- A portrait of Elon a Judge of Israel from Bartolomeo Gai's Epitome historico-chronologica
- Other names: אֵילוֹן הַזְּבוּלֹנִי; Elon Zevuloni
- Predecessor: Ibzan
- Successor: Abdon

Elon (Hebrew: אֵילֹון ʼĒlōn, "oak") was a leader (judge) of the ancient Israelites according to the biblical Book of Judges.

Elon appears in Judges 12:11–12. He was a member of the Tribe of Zebulun who served as a judge of Israel for ten years. He was preceded by Ibzan and succeeded by Abdon. Elon, along with Tola, Yair, Ibzan, and Abdon are only briefly mentioned and may be the names of clans.

Elon is translated as "Ahialon" in the Douay–Rheims Bible and other translations.

== See also ==
- Shophet

Elon (Judges) Tribe of Zebulun
Preceded by Ibzan	Judge of Israel	Succeeded by Abdon
