= Ibzan =

One of the Judges of Israel

- אִבְצָן
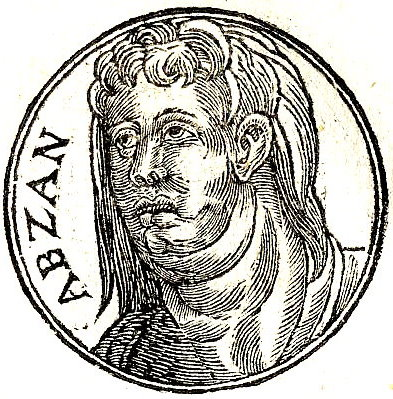
- Ibzan from Promptuarii Iconum Insigniorum
- Burial place: Bethlehem
- Predecessor: Jephthah
- Successor: Elon

Ibzan (Hebrew: אִבְצָן ʾIḇṣān; Ancient Greek: Ἀβαισσάν; Latin: Abesan, meaning "illustrious") appears in the Hebrew Bible as the ninth of the Judges of Israel.

== Biography ==
Little is said of Ibzan apart from this:

^{8}And after him [i.e. Jephthah], Ibzan of Bethlehem judged Israel.
^{9} And he had thirty sons, and thirty daughters, whom he sent abroad, and took in thirty daughters from abroad for his sons. And he judged Israel seven years.
^{10} Then died Ibzan, and was buried at Bethlehem.

— Judges 12:8–10 (King James Version)

Many scholars believe that the Bethlehem referred to in this passage is the Bethlehem in the territory of the Tribe of Zebulun, in Galilee (Joshua 19:15), rather than the more famous Bethlehem in the Tribe of Judah.

However, the Talmud (Bava Batra 91a) asserts that Ibzan is to be identified with Boaz from the Book of Ruth, who lived in the Bethlehem in Judah, and that he consummated his marriage with Ruth on the last night of his life.

== See also ==
- Biblical judges
- Book of Judges

Preceded by Jephthah	Judge of Israel	Succeeded by Elon
