= Abdon (Judges) =

One of the Judges of Israel

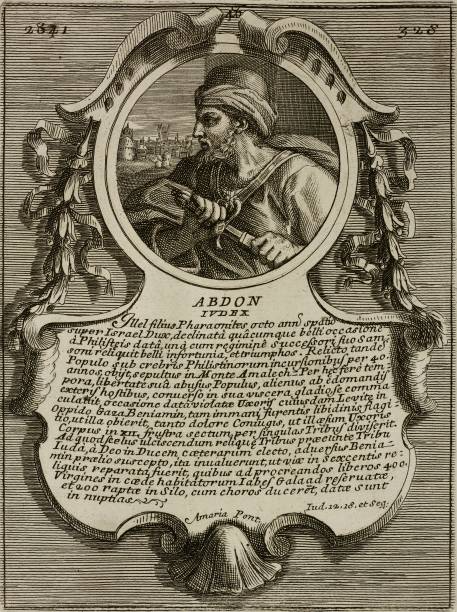
- A portrait of Abdon a Judge of Israel from Bartolomeo Gai's Epitome historico-chronologica 1751

Judge of Israel
- Born: Unknown; Pirathon, Tribe of Ephraim, Ancient Israel
- Died: Unknown; Pirathon, Tribe of Ephraim, Ancient Israel

Abdon (Hebrew: עַבְדּוֹן ‘Aḇdōn, "servile" or "service") was the son of Hillel, a Pirathonite, and was the eleventh Judge of Israel mentioned in the Book of Judges (Judges 12:13–15). He was a member of the tribe of Ephraim, and in the biblical account was credited with having forty sons and thirty grandsons. He restored order in the central area of Israel "after the disastrous feud with Jephtha and the Gileadites". He judged Israel for eight years. He was buried on Ephraimite land, in Pirathon, in the hill-country of the Amalekites.

== Veneration ==
An entirely different person with the same name is venerated in Catholic Church as a saint. That Abdon, a third-century Christian, has nothing to do with the Abdon mentioned in the Hebrew Bible. His feast day is 1 September.

== See also ==
- Biblical judges
- Book of Judges

Abdon (Judges) Tribe of Ephraim
Preceded by Elon	Judge of Israel	Succeeded by Samson
