= Havoth-Jair =

Havoth-Jair (Havvoth-Jair), or Havvot-Ya'ir is the name used by the Hebrew Bible to refer to a certain group or groups of villages on the east of the Jordan. In various biblical passages, the towns are identified as

- 60 towns in Machir (the eastern half-tribe of Manasseh) with Machir ancestry (Numbers 32:41, Deuteronomy 3:14)
- 33 villages in Gilead (Gad) with Machir ancestry (1 Kings 4:13, 1 Chronicles 2:22)
- 30 villages in Gilead with Gilead ancestry (Judges 10:4)

The group in Machir are identified by the bible as having been well fortified with high walls and gates, and in the time of Solomon are said to have formed a part of Ben-geber's commissariat district. This group are clearly identified by the bible as having been the main towns of the Argob, a rocky region in the otherwise gentle plain of Bashan, and having been originally ruled over by king Og, before Israelite dominion.

The name Havoth-Jair can mean hamlets of Jair, and the bible portrays these as having been founded by a person named Jair who conquered the previous towns and villages in these locations; in the case of the villages with Machir ancestry it is a Jair named as a son of Manassah, while those with Gilead ancestry are identified as being founded by a Jair who is a Gileadite. It is thought possible that the three groups of towns in fact refer to the same set of places, but that the different reports of ancestry and locations reflect the geo-political circumstances of the towns and villages, in the time periods that each particular part of the bible were written.
