= Tola (biblical figure) =

One of the Judges of Israel

- תּוֹלָע
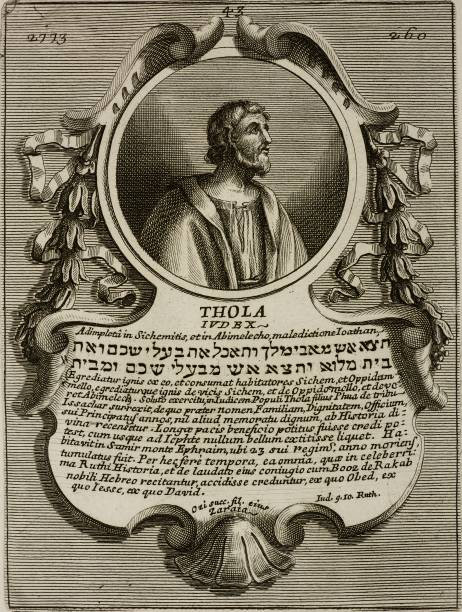
- Portrait of Tola from Epitome historico-chronologica (1751)
- Predecessor: Abimelech
- Successor: Jair

According to the Bible, Tola (Hebrew: תּוֹלָע, Modern: Tōlaʿ, Tiberian: Tōlāʿ) was one of the Judges of Israel. His career is summarised in Judges 10:1-2. He judged Israel for 23 years after Abimelech died. He lived at Shamir in Mount Ephraim, where he was also buried.

His name means "Crimson worm" or "scarlet stuff." The son of Puah (Note: There is no clear biblical evidence to suggest that the mother of Tolah (Judges 10:1) and Puah the midwife (Exodus 1:15-21) are the same person. The midwife lived during the period of Israel's enslavement in Egypt, whereas Tolah's mother lived several generations later, during the time of the Judges after the Exodus.) and the grandson of Dodo from the tribe of Issachar, he had the same name as one of the sons of Issachar who migrated to Egypt with Jacob his grandfather in Genesis 46:13.

Of all the biblical judges, the least is written about Tola. None of his deeds are recorded. The entire account from Judges 10:1-2 (KJV) follows:

^{1}And after Abimelech there arose to defend Israel Tola the son of Puah, the son of Dodo, a man of Issachar; and he dwelt in Shamir in mount Ephraim.
^{2}And he judged Israel twenty and three years, and died, and was buried in Shamir.

== See also ==
- Biblical judges
- Book of Judges
- List of minor biblical figures

Tola of Issachar Tribe of Issachar
| Preceded by Abimelech | Judge of Israel | Succeeded by Jair |
