= Jair (biblical figure) =

One of the Judges of Israel

- יָאיר
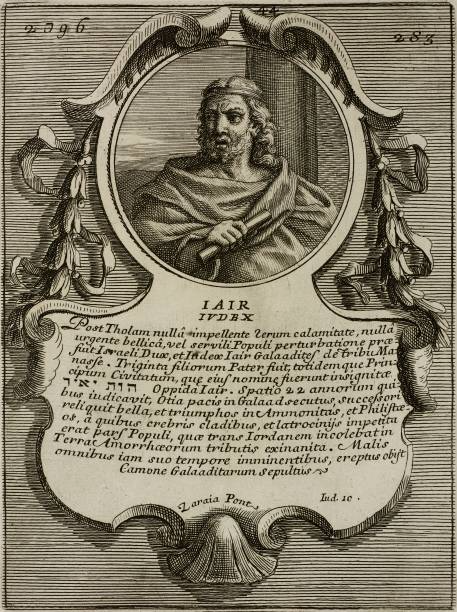
- Portrait of Jair from Bartolomeo Gai's Epitome historico-chronologica (1751)
- Predecessor: Tola
- Successor: Jephthah
- Father: Segub

In the Biblical Book of Judges, Jair or Yair (Hebrew: יָאִיר Yā’īr, "he enlightens") was a man from Gilead. He was of the Tribe of Manasseh and also descended from the Tribe of Judah (Numbers 32:39-41, 1 Chronicles 2:21-23). Jair judged Israel for 22 years, after the death of Tola, who had ruled for 23 years. His inheritance was in Gilead through the line of Machir, the son of Manasseh.

According to Judges 10:3–5, Jair had thirty sons, who rode thirty ass colts, and controlled 30 cities in Gilead which came to be known as Havoth-Jair (Judges 10:4; cf. 23 towns in 1 Chronicles 2:22). The word chawwoth ('tent encampments') occurs only in this context (Numbers 32:41; Deuteronomy 3:14; Judges 10:4).

Jair died and was buried in Kamon, which could be a place that Antiochus III conquered, according to Polybius, but also could be a symbolic term related to the Greek word for 'furnace'.

After his death there were 18 years of infidelity to the God of the Israelites and oppression at the hands of their Philistine and Ammonite neighbours.

King David appointed a Jairite named Ira as his chief ruler or priest after Sheba's rebellion.

== Genealogy ==
Jair’s father was Segub. Segub’s father was Hezron. Hezron’s father was Perez. Perez’s father was Judah. Segub’s mother was Machir’s daughter. Machir was the son of Manasseh.

== In Jewish legend ==
According to Pseudo-Philo (38-39) and the Chronicle of Jerahmeel (48 and 68),

The successor to Abimelech equalled, if he did not surpass, him in wickedness. Jair erected an altar unto Baal, and on penalty of death he forced the people to prostrate themselves before it. Only seven men remained firm in the true faith, and refused to the last to commit idolatry. Their names were Deuel, Abit Yisreel, Jekuthiel, Shalom, Ashur, Jehonadab, and Shemiel. They said to Jair: "We are mindful of the lessons given us by our teachers and our mother Deborah. 'Take ye heed,' they said, 'that your heart lead you not astray to the right or to the left. Day and night ye shall devote yourselves to the study of the Torah.' Why, then, dost thou seek to corrupt the people of the Lord, saying, 'Baal is God, let us worship him'? If he really is what thou sayest, then let him speak like a god, and we will pay him worship." For the blasphemy they had uttered against Baal, Jair commanded that the seven men be burnt. When his servants were about to carry out his order, God sent the angel Nathaniel, the lord over the fire, and he extinguished the fire though not before the servants of Jair were consumed by it. Not only did the seven men escape the danger of suffering death by fire, but the angel enabled them to flee unnoticed, by striking all the people present with blindness. Then the angel approached Jair, and said to him: "Hear the words of the Lord ere thou diest. I appointed thee as prince over my people, and thou didst break My covenant, seduce My people, and seek to burn My servants with fire, but they were animated and freed by the living, the heavenly fire. As for thee, thou wilt die, and die by fire, a fire in which thou wilt abide forever." Thereupon the angel burnt him with a thousand men, whom he had taken in the act of paying homage to Baal.

== See also ==
- Biblical judges
- Book of Judges

Jair (biblical figure) Tribe of Manasseh
Preceded by Tola	Judge of Israel	Succeeded by Jephthah
