= Jephthah =

Judge of ancient Israel

- יפתח
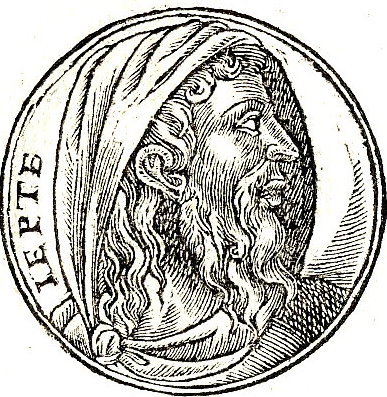
- Portrait from Promptuarium Iconum Insigniorum (1553) by Guillaume Rouillé
- Predecessor: Jair
- Successor: Ibzan

Jephthah (pronounced /ˈdʒɛfθə/; Hebrew: יִפְתָּח, Yiftāḥ) appears in the Book of Judges as a judge who presided over Israel for a period of six years (Judges 12:7). According to Judges, he lived in Gilead. His father's name is also given as Gilead, and, as his mother is described as a prostitute, this may indicate that his father might have been any of the men of that area. Jephthah led the Israelites in battle against Ammon and, in exchange for defeating the Ammonites, made a vow to sacrifice whatever would come out of the door of his house first. When his daughter was the first to come out of the house, he immediately regretted the vow, which bound him to sacrifice his daughter to God. Jephthah carried out his vow.

Traditionally, Jephthah ranks among the major judges because of the length of the biblical narrative referring to him, but his story also shares features with those of the minor judges, such as his short tenure—only six years—in office.

== Biblical account ==
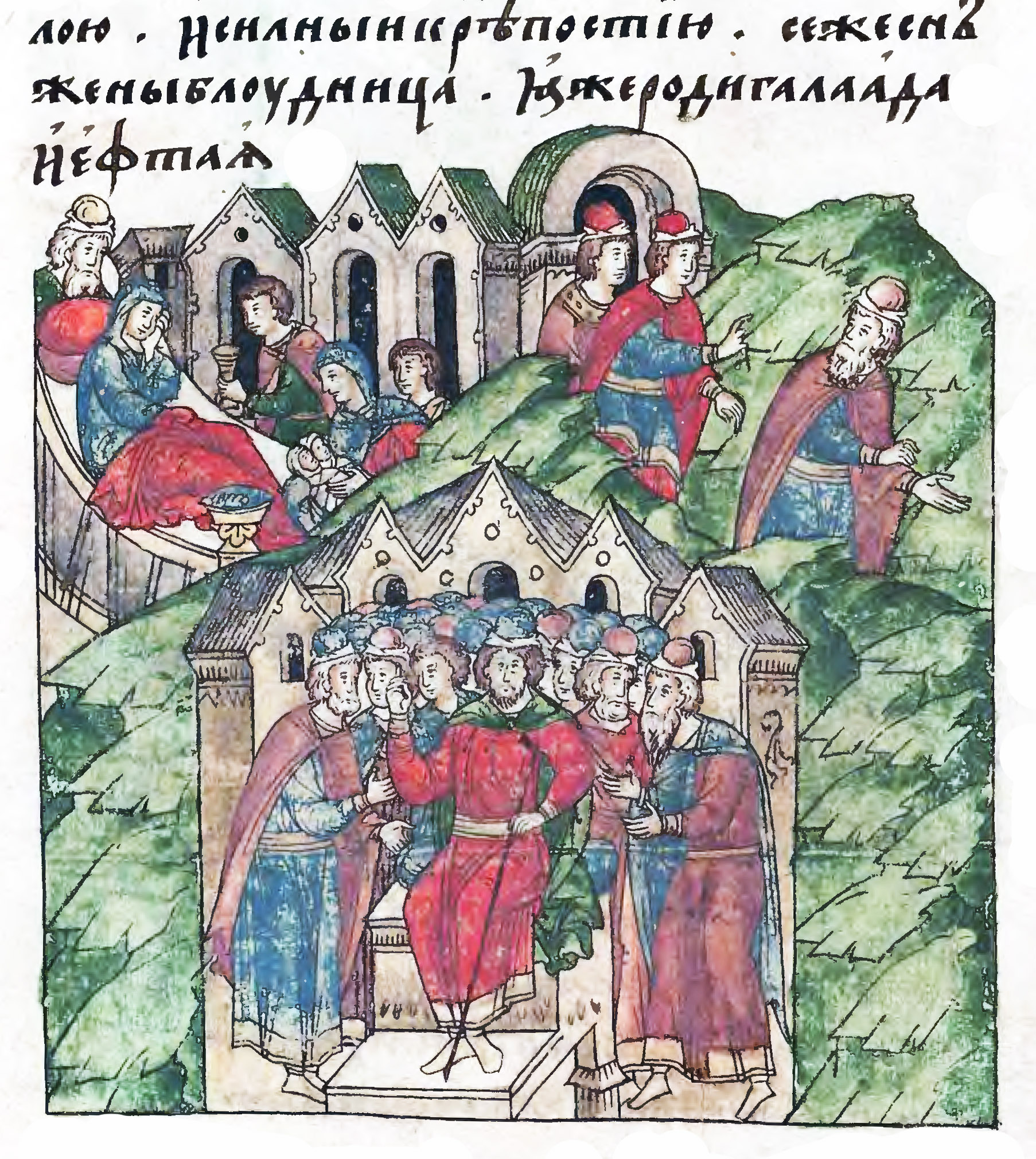
1) Jephthah being expelled by his half-brothers; 2) Jephthah being asked to become a Judge (Russian manuscript of the 1560s)

The traditional tale of Jephthah became part of the Book of Judges (Judges 11–12). The Israelites "again did what was evil in the sight of the Lord ... they forsook the Lord and did not serve him. So the anger of the Lord was kindled against Israel, and he sold them into the hand of the Philistines and into the hand of the Ammonites ...".

The illegitimate Jephthah, driven out by his half-brothers, took up his dwelling in Tob, east of the land of Gilead. "Outlaws collected around Jephthah and went raiding with him." The elders of Gilead ask him to lead them in fighting against the Ammonites, but he holds out for a more permanent and a broader position, and the elders agree that, provided Jephthah succeeds in defeating Ammon, he will be their permanent chieftain. On behalf of Israel as a whole and in reliance on the might of God the Judge, Jephthah challenges the Ammonites. Jephthah swears an oath:

whatever [footnote: Or whoever] comes out from the doors of my house to meet me when I return in peace from the Ammonites shall be the LORD's, and I will offer it [footnote: Or him] up for a burnt offering.

—Judges 11:31, English Standard Version

The victorious Jephthah is met on his return by his only child, a daughter. Jephthah tears his clothes and cries, "Alas, my daughter! You have brought me very low!" but is bound by his vow: "I have opened my mouth to the Lord, and I cannot take back my vow". The girl asks for two months' grace, "...that I may go up and down on the mountains and weep for my virginity". And so Jephthah "did with her according to his vow that he had made". The story ends by recounting how "the daughters of Israel went year by year to lament the daughter of Jephthah, the Gileadite, four days in the year".

Later, Jephthah was forced to fight against the Ephraimites, who refused to aid him in his struggle against the Ammonites. The story is remembered for the killing of the fugitive Ephraimites who were identified by their accent; they said the Hebrew word shibboleth as sibboleth. "At that time 42,000 of the Ephraimites fell" (Judges 12:5–6).

The Epistle to the Hebrews mentions Jephthah in a list of distinguished Old Testament figures.

== Commentary ==
=== Sacrifice of daughter ===
Jephthah's sacrifice of his daughter stands in stark contrast to the Binding of Isaac in the Book of Genesis, in which Abraham was about to perform a divinely ordered sacrifice of his son, when an angel of God directly intervened and stopped the sacrifice.

Some writers have observed that the Israelites of the time widely disrespected Mosaic law, which forbade human sacrifice; and that there are several other examples of rash vows, some with similarly terrible consequences (for instance 2 Samuel 21:6–9). David Janzen argued that the story was an integral part of the Deuteronomist picture of moral decline through adoption of non-Israelitic practices such as child sacrifice. Solomon Landers believed that the absence of express judgement implies that the sacrifice was not acceptable to God, notwithstanding the fact that the sacrifice nevertheless happened.

Pseudo-Philo's Liber Antiquitatum Biblicarum gives a name for Jephthah's daughter, Seila. Her character is elaborated and emphasized; "the author has done his utmost to put this woman on the same level as the patriarchs, in this case especially Isaac." John Chrysostom held that God allowed Jephthah to kill his daughter in order to prevent similar rash vows being made in the future and that it was for that purpose that the annual bewailing of the event took place as a constant reminder. Ambrose cited the story as an example of how it is "sometimes contrary to duty to fulfill a promise, or to keep an oath".

One midrash characterizes Yiftach (Jephthah) as a person of poor judgment, who makes "unfitting" vows without proper consideration for consequences (B'reishit Rabbah, 60:3). Another midrash (Tanhuma Bechukotai 7) asserts that if Jephthah had read the laws of vows in the Torah, he would not have lost his daughter. The rabbis also ascribe Jephthah's death to his actions, as punishment: "Jephthah’s penalty consists of the shedding of his limbs, which are buried in numerous places, as is learned from Jud. 12:7: 'Then Jephthah the Gileadite died and he was buried in the towns of Gilead.' One limb would slough away and be buried in one location, and then another would fall off somewhere else and be buried there." Rashi also quotes the Midrash Rabba saying that he was punished for not going to the high priest to get the vow annulled and was afflicted with an illness that caused his limbs to decompose off of his body at which point it would be buried where it fell thereby explaining the verse that said he was buried in the cities as opposed to city of Gilead. According to some rabbinical commentators, Phineas also sinned by failing to address the needs of relieving Jephthah of his vow to sacrifice his daughter. As consequence, the high priesthood was taken from him and temporarily given to the offspring of Ithamar, essentially Eli and his sons.

Since at least the 12th or 13th century, Jewish scholars, among them the compiler and summarizer David Kimhi (1160–1235) and Levi Ben Gershon (1288–1344), have taken fulfilment of Jephthah's vow as meaning that he only kept her in seclusion. This view is put forward also by Christian scholars from the 14th century and continues to be propounded today, as by Solomon Landers, who considers it most likely that the fate of Jephthah's daughter was perpetual virginity or solitary confinement.

Ethelbert William Bullinger looks at the word "and" in Jephthah's vow (Judges 11:31: "whatever comes out of the doors of my house to meet me, when I return in peace from the people of Ammon, shall surely be the Lord's, and I will offer it up as a burnt offering"). As he explains the Hebrew prefix "ו" that is translated in the above passage as "and" is often used as a disjunctive, and means "or", when there is a second proposition. Indeed, this rendering is suggested in the margin of the A.V. Bullinger goes on to give examples from the Bible where the same word has been translated as "or". According to him, the right translation of this passage is: "whatever comes out of the doors of my house to meet me, when I return in peace from the people of Ammon, shall surely be the Lord's, or I will offer it up as a burnt offering." Jephthah's daughter, being the first that came out of the house, was thus, according to Bullinger, dedicated to God. He also says:

In any case, it should have been unlawful, and repugnant to Jehovah, to offer a human being to Him as a burnt-offering, for His acceptance. Such offerings were common to heathen nations at that time, but it is noteworthy that Israel stands out among them with this great peculiarity, that human sacrifices were unknown in Israel.

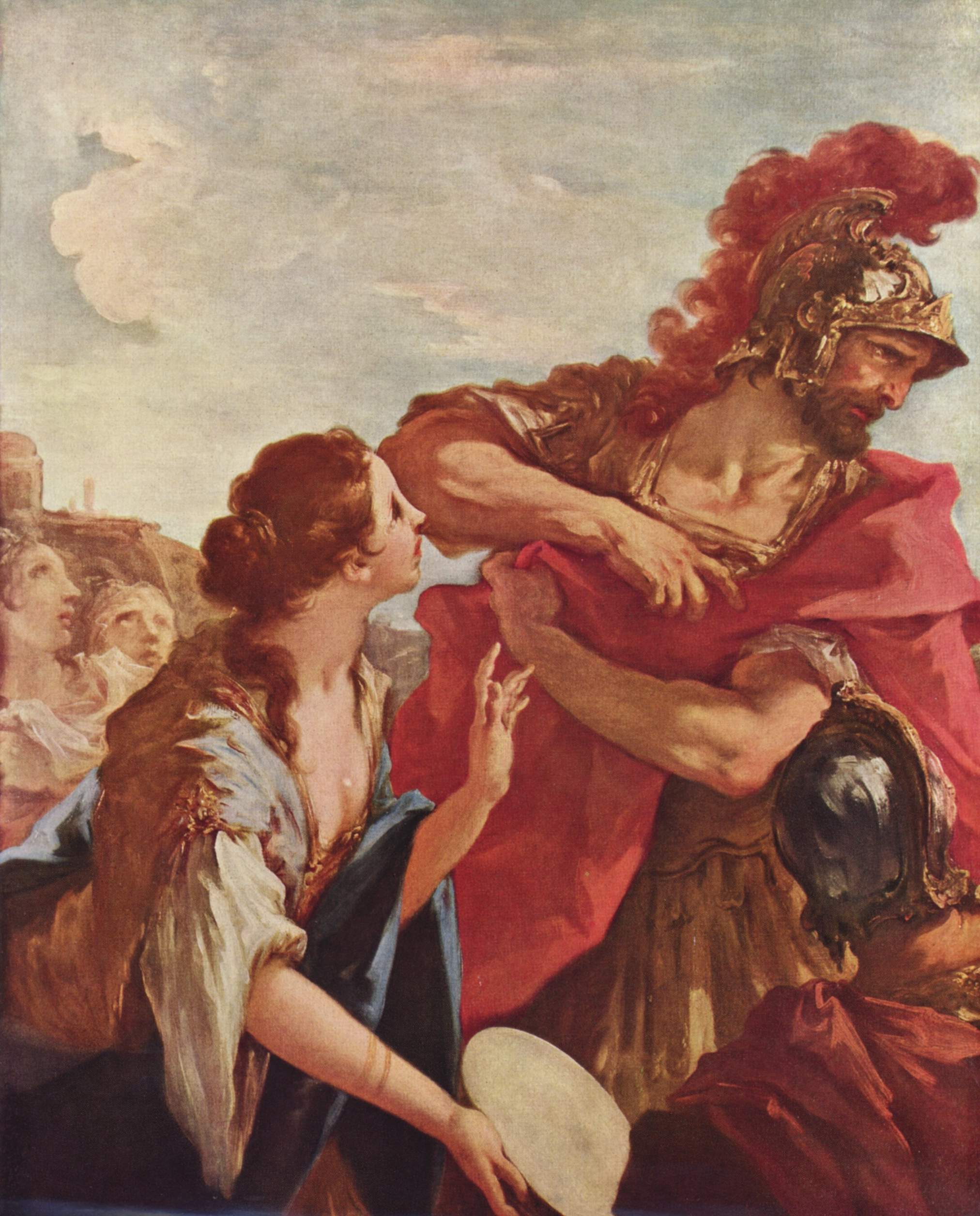
The Return of Jephtha, by Giovanni Antonio Pellegrini

However, in the Hebrew Bible, the same word for 'burnt offering' (Hebrew, ʿōlāh) used in reference to Jephthah and his daughter in Judges 11:31 is also used in other Biblical stories alluding to human sacrifice, such as the story of Abraham and Isaac (Genesis 22) and Mesha of Moab and his son (2 Kings 3:27). Moreover, an ʿōlāh in the Hebrew Bible exemplifies a pure gift to the deity. Thus, Jephthah is not stating an alternative between dedicating something to God and offering it up as a burnt offering, but clearly linking the two.

Adam Clarke's Commentary has an exposition of the issues at stake in this passage and contends that the vow Jephthah made was not as rash as it sounds.

The Order of the Eastern Star refers to her as Adah.

=== Possible origins ===
Israel Finkelstein has suggested that behind multiple and large-scale Deuteronomistic and post-Deuteronomistic additions and redactions, there may lie an oral story which reflects a conflict on the boundary between Israelite and Ammonite settlements in Transjordan, around the towns of Gilead and Mizpah. It may have been first written down in the 8th century BCE, when the Northern kingdom of Israel (Samaria) began to collect its heroic tales, royal stories, and foundation myths. Finkelstein has also suggested that the story of Jephthah's vow may have been added into the story as late as the Hellenistic period.

Some observers have noted the similarities between Jephthah and the mythical Cretan general, Idomeneus, as related by Servius the Grammarian in his Commentary on the Aeneid of Vergil. Idomeneus had asked the gods to calm a storm, promising in return that he would sacrifice the first living thing he saw upon his return, which turned out to be his son. The similarity has caused some to wonder if they share a common ancestor.

A similar story about Meander is given by Pseudo-Plutarch.

The story of Jephthah's daughter is also sometimes compared to that of Agamemnon's daughter Iphigenia. In his play Jephthas sive votum – Jeptha or the Vow, the Scottish scholar and dramatist George Buchanan (1506–1582) called Jephthah's daughter "Iphis", obviously alluding to Iphigenia, and Handel's 1751 oratorio, Jephtha, based on Buchanan's play, uses the same name.

=== Jephthah and Samuel ===
The Talmud (Rosh Hashanah 25) comments on the juxtaposition of Jephthah's and Samuel's names in 1 Samuel 12:11. It expounds that the authority of the current leader of the community must be respected, even if they are less distinguished than leaders of other eras: "Jephthah in his generation is like Samuel in his generation."

== Burial ==
According to an early Jewish tradition, Jephthah was buried in Ajloun, a town in present-day Jordan.

== Cultural influence ==
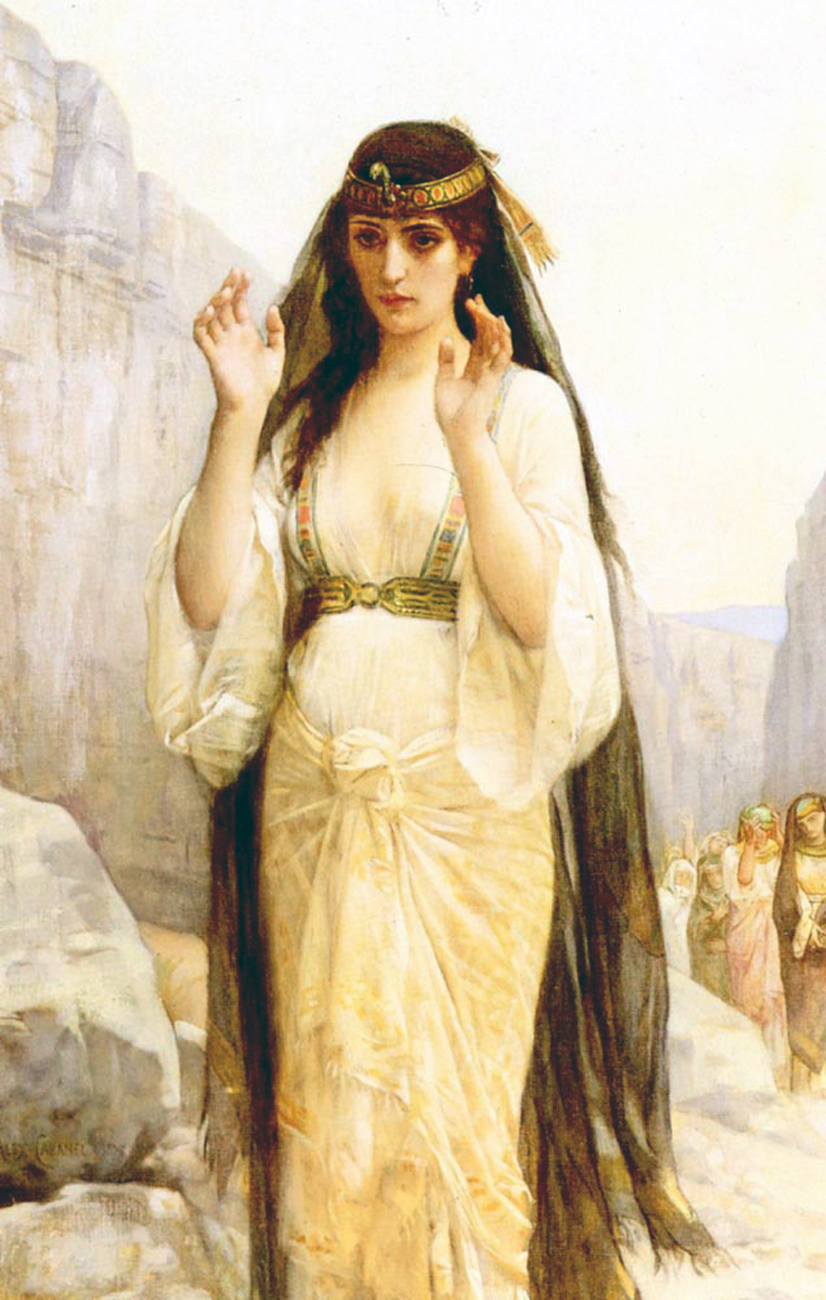
The Daughter of Jephthah, by Alexandre Cabanel (1879)

The story of Jephthah has influenced a number of literary works.

- Historia di Jephta, an oratorio by Giacomo Carissimi.
- Jephthes, sive Votum, a tragedy by George Buchanan (1554).
- Jeptha of Offerbelofte, a play by Joost van den Vondel (1659), a reworking in Dutch of the play by Buchanan.
- Two Treatises of Government, A political and theological book John Locke (1689) challenging the divine right of kings, using Jephthah to demonstrate his "appeal to heaven" for changing government by the use of force in the absence of an earthly authority to petition to. See Book II, section 21. This concept is extremely important in first amendment jurisprudence, and is one of the strongest arguments against temporary restraining orders that enjoin speech, also known as a prior restraint, because of how dangerous they are. See for example Milk Wagon Drivers v. Meadowmoor Dairies, Inc. 312 U.S. 287,293 (1941).
- Jephté, a tragedy by Charles Piroye (1703).
- Jephté, an opera by Michel Pignolet de Montéclair (1732).
- Jephtha, an oratorio by Maurice Greene (1737).
- Jephtha, an oratorio by George Frideric Handel (1751).
- Jephtas Gelübde, an opera by Meyerbeer (1812).
- Jephtha an oratorio by John H. Hewitt (1846).
- The Vow, a one-act opera based on the story, by Colin McAlpin (1915).
- The story of Jephthah and his daughter is the subject of Lion Feuchtwanger's historical novel, Jefta und seine Tochter (1957), English translation, Jephta and His Daughter, also known as Jephthah and His Daughter, published 1958
- In Hamlet, Polonius tells Prince Hamlet "If you call me Jephthah, my lord, I have a daughter I love passing well." The daughter in reference is Ophelia.
- The 2015 winner of the BP Portrait Award, Annabelle and Guy by Matan Ben-Cnaan was inspired by the story of Jephthah and his daughter.
- The 2008 novel Ever by Gail Carson Levine is based on the story of Jephthah's daughter; Judges 11:34 is quoted in the foreword, and the plot follows the story of a girl in a Bronze Age Middle Eastern–inspired society whose father promises to sacrifice to his god the first person who congratulates him on his wife's recovery from an illness.
- The song "Burn, Baby Burn" by The Residents (from their album Wormwood: Curious Stories from the Bible) is inspired by the story of Jephthah.
- The episode "The Folly of Jephthah", episode 5 of series 8 of the BBC's Father Brown television adaptations, revolves around a wager between a father and daughter.

== See also ==
- Abel-cheramim
- Biblical judges
- Binding of Isaac

== Bibliography ==
- Finkelstein, Israel (2016), The Old Jephthah Tale in Judges: Geographical and Historical Considerations, vol. 97, Biblical Studies on the Web, pp. 1–15

Jephthah Tribe of Manasseh or Tribe of Gad
Preceded by Jair	Judge of Israel	Succeeded by Ibzan
