= Ruske kape =

Balkan cake dessert

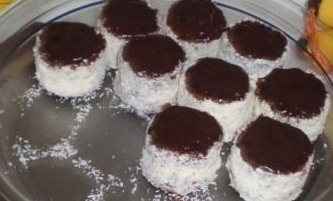
- Homemade Ruske kape
- Course: Dessert
- Region or state: Balkans
- Serving temperature: Chilled
- Main ingredients: Coconut, chocolate

Ruske kape (lit. 'Russian caps') are types of cake desserts served in the Balkan countries, especially Bosnia and Herzegovina, Croatia, and Serbia. They usually come in a 60-millimetre-wide (2.4 in) round serving and include coconut around the edge or sometimes crushed walnuts. The top is usually chocolate, drizzled with vanilla. The center includes layers of alternating vanilla, chocolate, and sometimes a mocha flavor.

== Background ==
The design of the confectionery itself is based on the papakha, a traditional shepherd's hat that is worn throughout the mountainous Caucasus region. However, the term "ruske kape" comes from the Russian Cossacks who wore the hat in the regiments they belonged to, hence its given name in the Balkans. This dessert is served chilled, usually on colorful plates drizzled with chocolate. It can be eaten with a fork but is sometimes eaten in a casual manner; people eat the dessert like a cupcake with the hands.

== Gallery ==
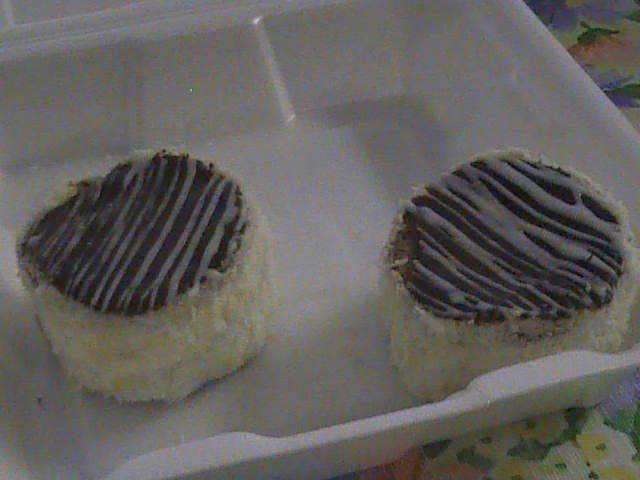
Homemade Ruske Kape drizzled with vanilla

== See also ==
- Coconut cake
- List of desserts
