= Goad =

Tool used to guide livestock in motion

The goad is a traditional farming implement, used to spur or guide livestock, usually oxen, when pulling a plow or a cart; used also to round up cattle. It is a type of long stick with a pointed end, also known as the cattle prod.

The word is from Middle English gode, from Old English gād.

In Sophocles's Oedipus Rex, Oedipus's father Laius tried to kill his son with a goad when they accidentally met at a crossroads.

== Religious significance ==
Goads in various guises are used as iconographic devices and may be seen in the elephant goad (Sanskrit: 𑀅𑀗𑁆𑀓𑀼𑀰, romanized: aṅkuśa, lit. 'hook') in the hand of Ganesha, for example.

In Judges 3:31, the shophet Shamgar, son of Anath, kills six hundred Philistines with an ox goad. Tischler and McHenry (2006: p. 251) in discussing the biblical account of 'goad', note that "In the early days, before Israel had its metal industries, farmers had to rely on the Philistines to sharpen their goads, as well as other metal tools, the plowshares and mattocks, forks, and axes (1 Sam. 13:20)."

The image of prodding the reluctant or lazy creature made this a useful metaphor for sharp urgings, such as the prick of conscience, the nagging of a mate, or the "words of the wise," which are "firmly embedded nails" in human minds (Ecclesiastes 12:11-12).

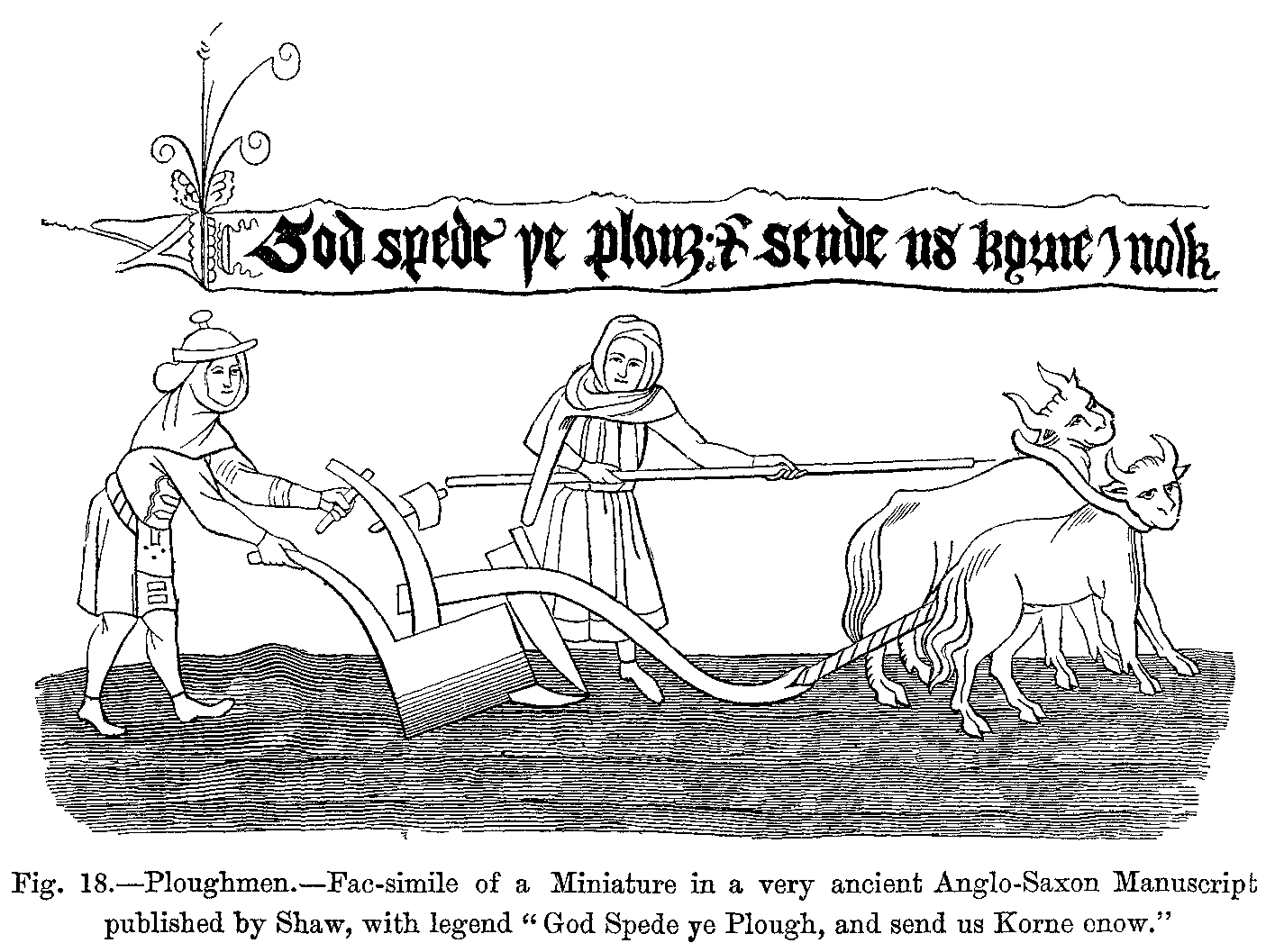
Ploughing with oxen: a miniature from an early-16th-century manuscript held at the British Museum. The ploughman on the right appears to carry a goad. The ox on the left appears to react to it. Note the spike or prod at the end of this goad.

Paul the Apostle, recounting the story of his conversion before Herod Agrippa II in Acts 26:14, told of a voice he heard saying ‘Saul, Saul, why are you persecuting Me? It is hard for you to kick against the goads.’ Some versions of the actual account of his conversion earlier in the Acts of the Apostles also use the same phrase in Acts 9:5 in some manuscripts.

In the Latin alphabet, the letter L is derived from the Semitic crook or goad which stood for /l/. This may originally have been based on an Egyptian hieroglyph that was adapted by Semites for alphabetic purposes. Pollack (2004: p. 146), in discussing 'Lamed, Path 22' the path from Gevurah to Tiferet, Justice, in the pathworking of the esoteric Kabbalah, states:

We switch sides now and bring the power of Gevurah to the center. Lamed means 'goad' and in particular an ox-goad, as if we use the power of Gevurah to goad that Aleph ox, the silent letter, into a more tangible physical existence in the heart of the tree [of life]. Lamed begins the Hebrew words for both "learn" and "teach," and so encompasses the most Kabbalist of activities, study. Kabbalah has never been a path of pure sensation, but always has used study to goad us into higher consciousness. Lamed, alone of the Hebrew alphabet, reaches above the height of all the other letters. Through learning we extend ourselves above ordinary awareness.

== See also ==
- Mazzarella
- Shepherd's crook
- Cattle prod
- Crozier
