= Shepherd's crook =

Tool for managing livestock

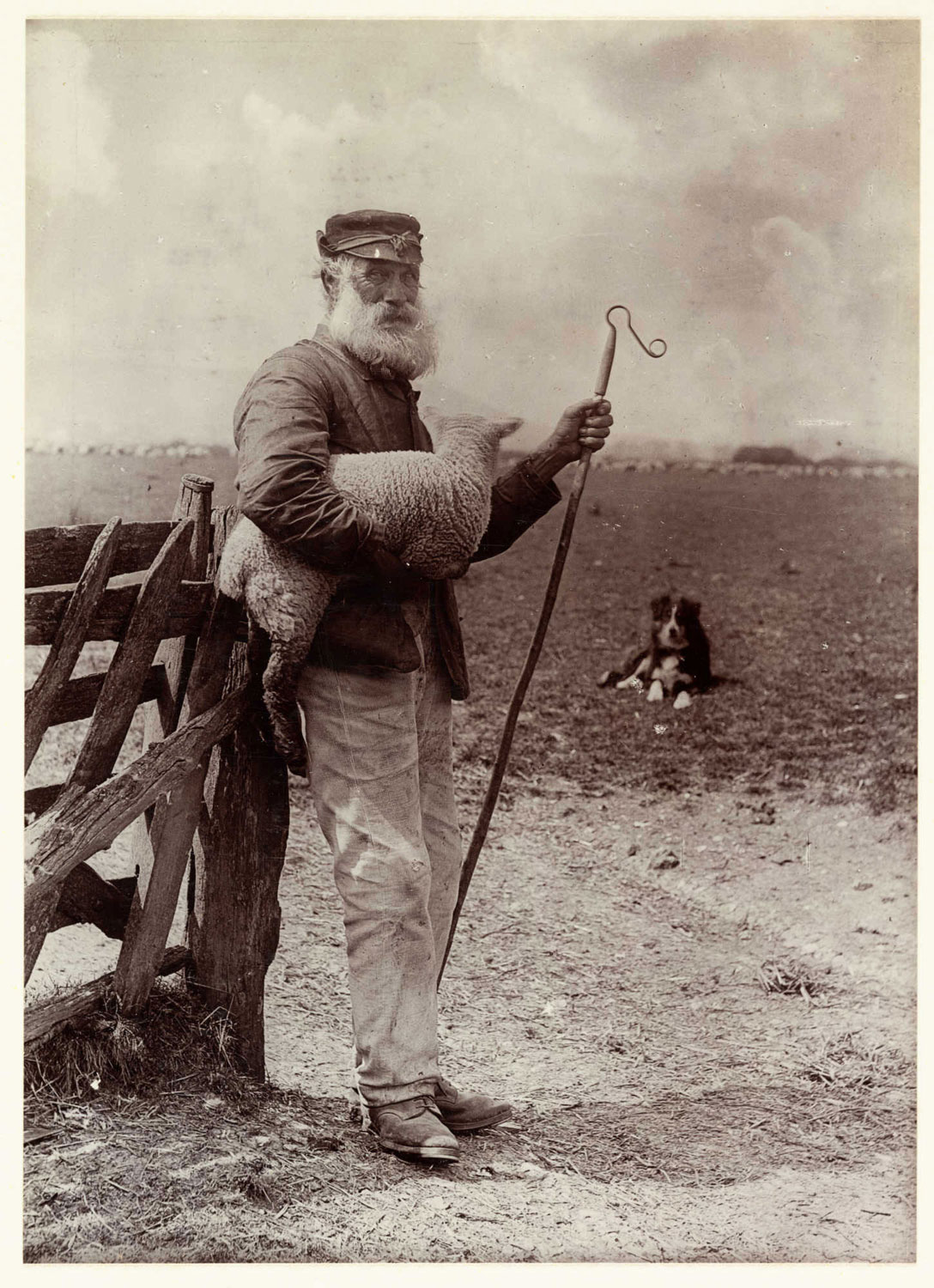
Shepherd holding a crook

A shepherd's crook is a long and sturdy stick with a hook at one end, often with the point flared outwards, used by a shepherd to manage and sometimes catch sheep. In addition, the crook may aid in defending against attack by predators.

When traversing rough terrain, a crook is an aid to balance (like a trekking pole). Shepherds may also use the long implement to part thick undergrowth (for example at the edge of a drovers' road) when searching for lost sheep or potential predators (such as wolves, etc.), as a staff-weapon for self-defence, and as a panking pole (used to shake ripe fruit, such as apples and pears, from high branches during harvesting).

== Symbolic use ==
The innovation of a hook facilitates the recovery of fallen animals by ensnaring them by the neck or leg. For this reason, the crook has been used as a religious symbol of care (particularly in difficult circumstances), including the Christian bishop's crosier.

In medicine, the term shepherd's crook is used to describe a right coronary artery that follows an unusually high and winding route. This variant, which has a prevalence of about 5%, imposes technical problems in angioplasty procedures.

The letter lamed originated as a representation of a shepherd's crook or goad, from which the Latin letter L has evolved.

Ancient Greeks called it κορύνη, λαγωβόλον and καλαῦροψ and in their art the crook is often seen in the hands of Pan and also is the usual attribute of Thalia, as the Muse of pastoral poetry.

The shepherd's crook is paired with the agricultural flail to form an insignia of pharaonic authority, with the crook representing kingship and the flail symbolizing the fertility of the land.

== Gallery ==
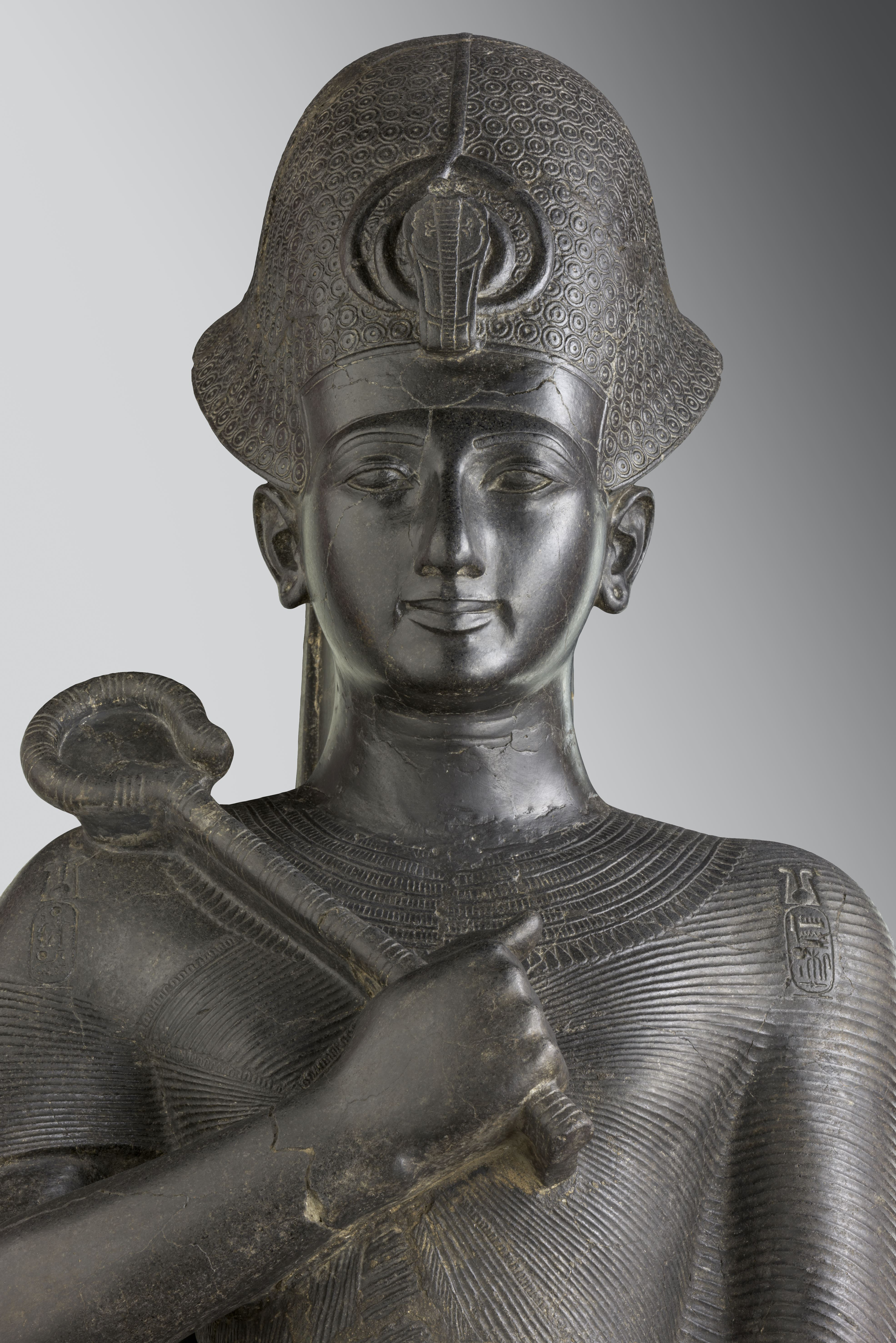
Ramses II, with the heka crook. Museo Egizio, Turin.

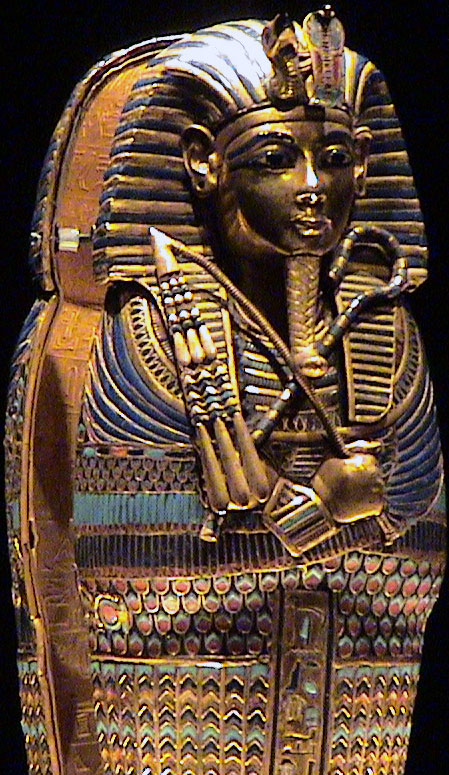
The crook and flail on the coffinette of Tutankhamun

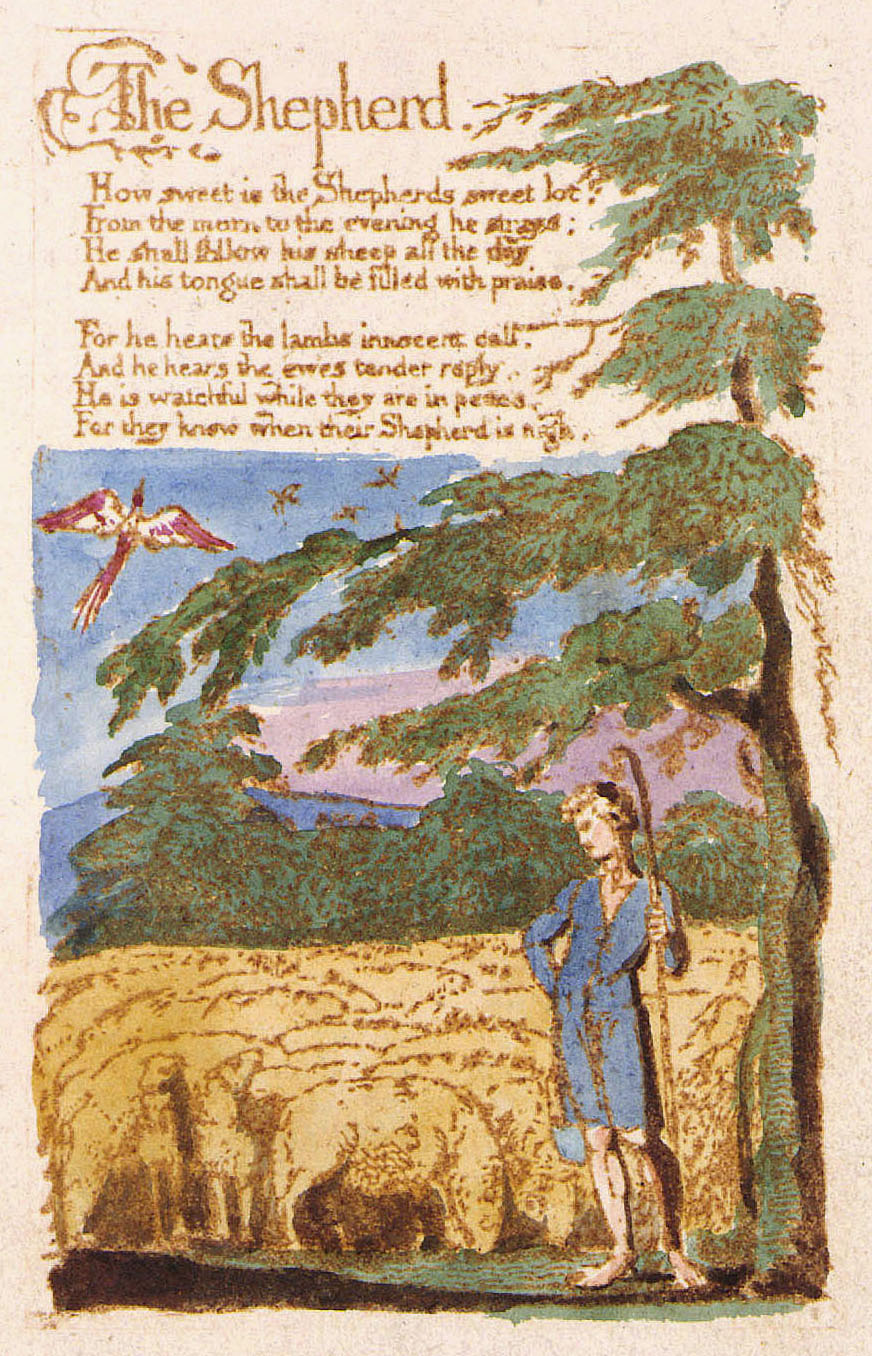
William Blake's hand painted print for his poem "The Shepherd" depicts the idyllic scene of a shepherd watching his flock with a shepherd's crook. This image represents copy B, printed and painted in 1789 and currently held by the Library of Congress.

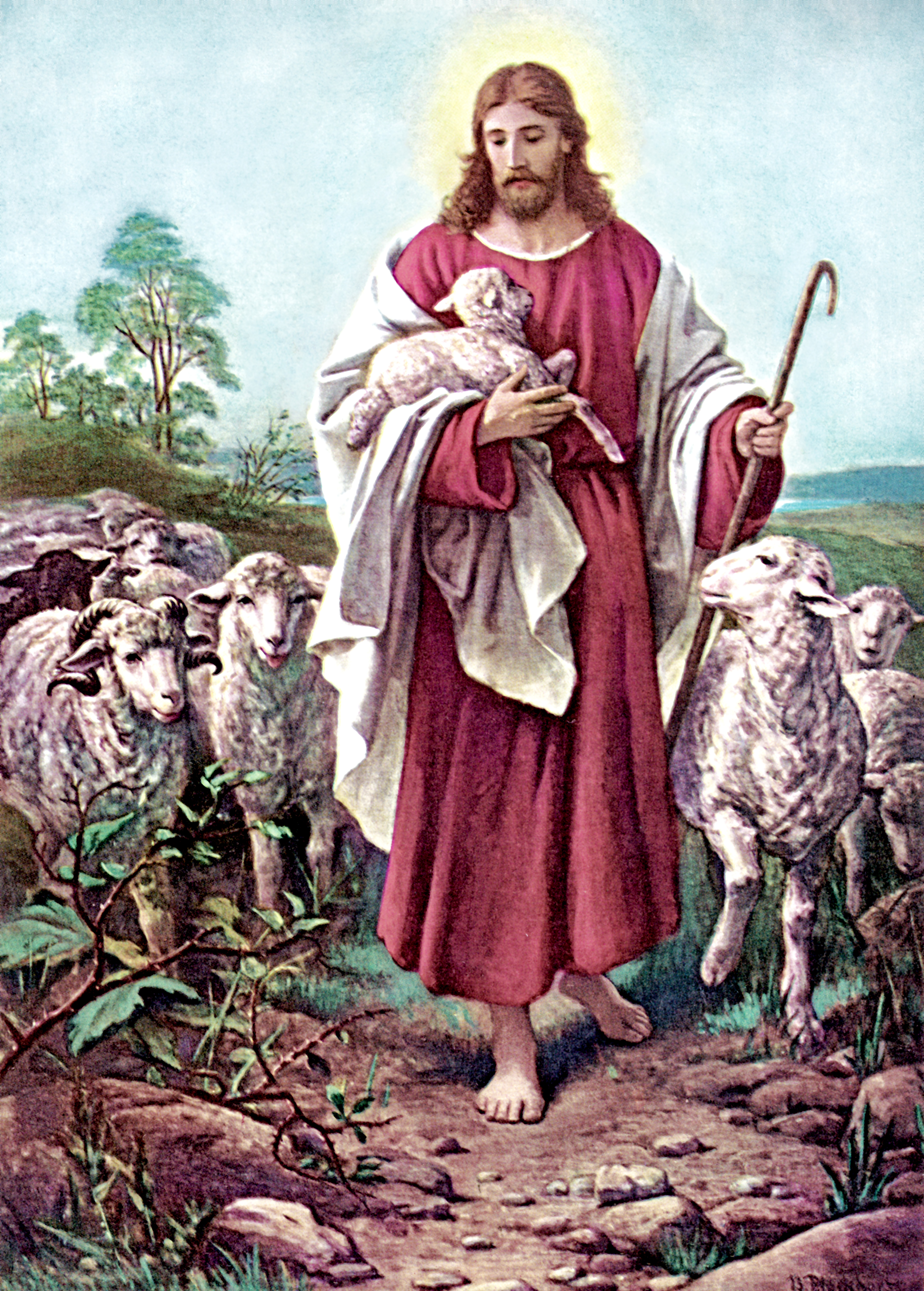
19th-century depiction of Jesus as the Good Shepherd

== See also ==
- Cattle prod
- Crook and flail
- Goad
- Lasso
- Mazzarella
- Shepherd's hat
