= Coconut cake =

Cake with white frosting and covered in coconut flakes

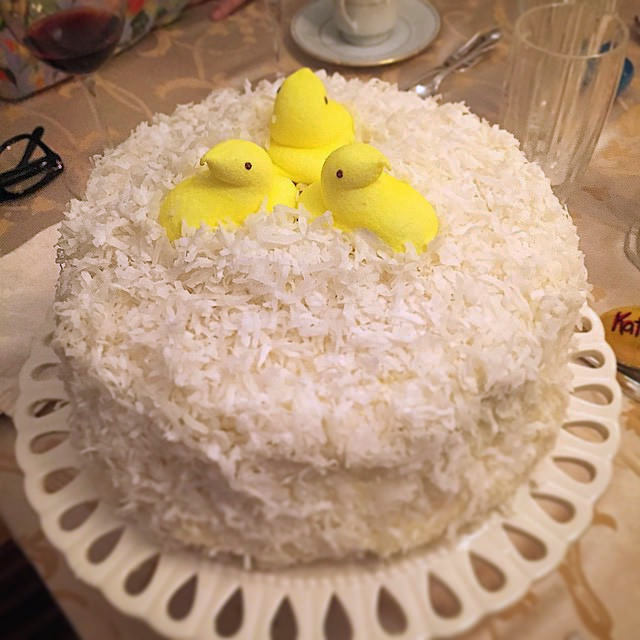
- A coconut cake garnished with Peeps
- Type: Cake
- Course: Dessert
- Place of origin: United States
- Region or state: Southern states
- Main ingredients: White or yellow cake, icing, coconut flakes
- Variations: Coconut poke cake

Coconut cake is a popular dessert in the Southern region of the United States. It is a cake frosted with a white frosting and covered in coconut flakes.

== Varieties ==
Typically, the cakes used in coconut cake are either white or yellow cakes. While some recipes do not call for coconut flavor in the cake itself, there are others that replace the milk with coconut milk or use coconut extract. It is also common to brush the cakes with a simple syrup to make it more moist. Often the cake layers are filled with either a white frosting or coconut pastry cream. Traditionally, the cake is frosted with a seven-minute frosting, but cream cheese icings and buttercreams are not uncommon. Like the cakes, coconut flavor is not always a must in the frosting. One constant characteristic of coconut cake is the use of shredded coconut (often toasted or sweetened) to cover the frosting.

One popular variation of coconut cake is coconut poke cake. While traditional coconut cake is round and multi-layered, coconut poke cake is either a white or yellow cake that is rectangular and single-layered. What makes it a "poke" cake are the holes made into the cake to act as pores to absorb a coconut liquid mixture or cream of coconut, such as CoCo Lopez. Afterwards, the cake is frosted with a whipped topping.

Many Southerners also make non-traditional versions of coconut cake. One popular variation is to pair the coconut with other flavors, particularly by filling the cake with a lemon curd to add a tart flavor to a usually very sweet cake. Red velvet cake, another cake popular in the South, will sometimes have shredded coconut cover the cake.

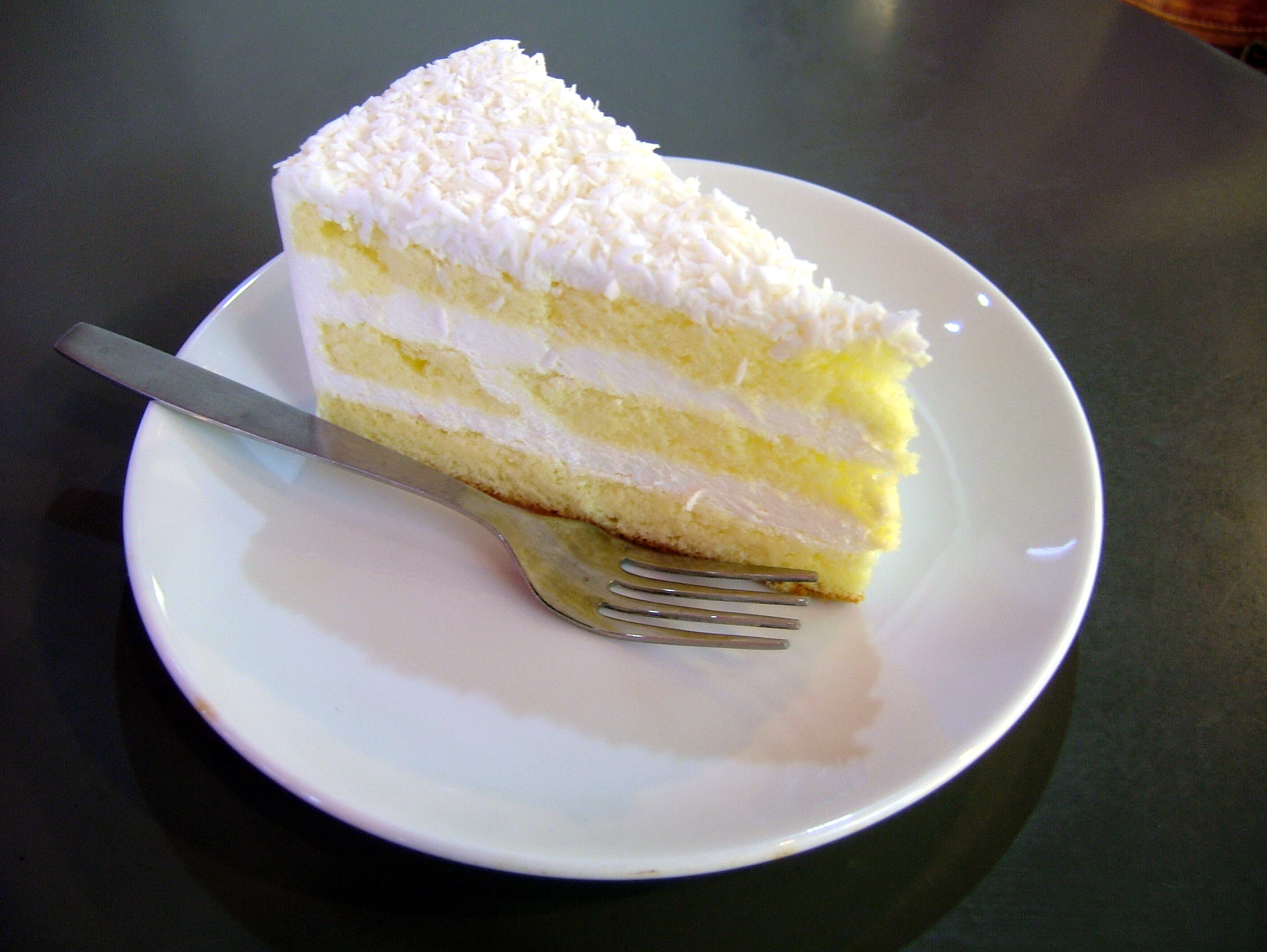
A slice of a layered coconut cake

== See also ==
- Coconut pandan cake
- German chocolate cake
- Grater cake
- Klappertaart
- Lamington
- Nagasari
- Ruske kape
- Sno Balls
- Sugar cake
