= Cattle prod =

Device used to make cattle or livestock move

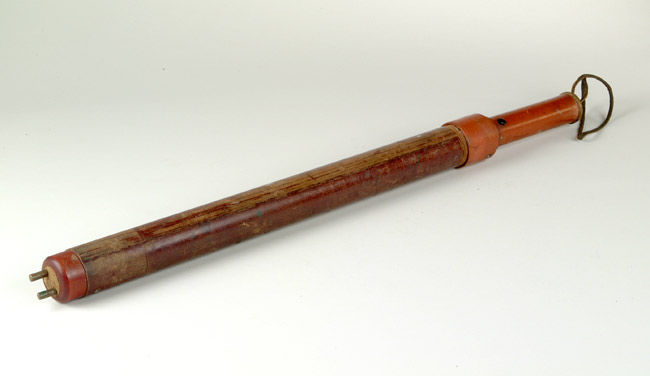
Electric cattle prod from the 1950s.

A cattle prod, also called a stock prod, is a handheld device commonly used to make cattle or other livestock move by striking or poking them. An electric cattle prod, also called a hot stick, is a stick with electrodes on the end which is used to make cattle move via a relatively high-voltage, low-current electric shock. The electric cattle prod is errantly claimed to have been invented by Texas cattle baron Robert J. Kleberg III, of the King Ranch around 1930, although visual evidence such as an advertisement in a 1917 magazine confirms that versions were sold nearly 15 years prior:

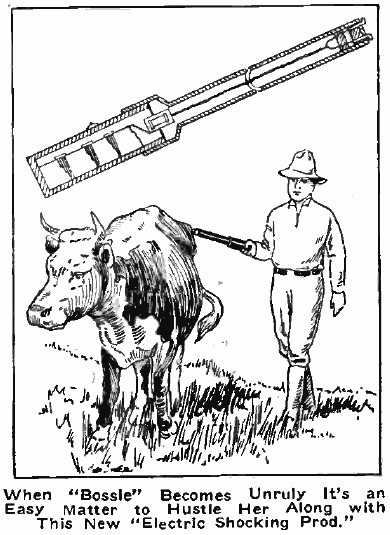
An ad for an electric cattle prod in 1917 magazine

== Electric prods ==
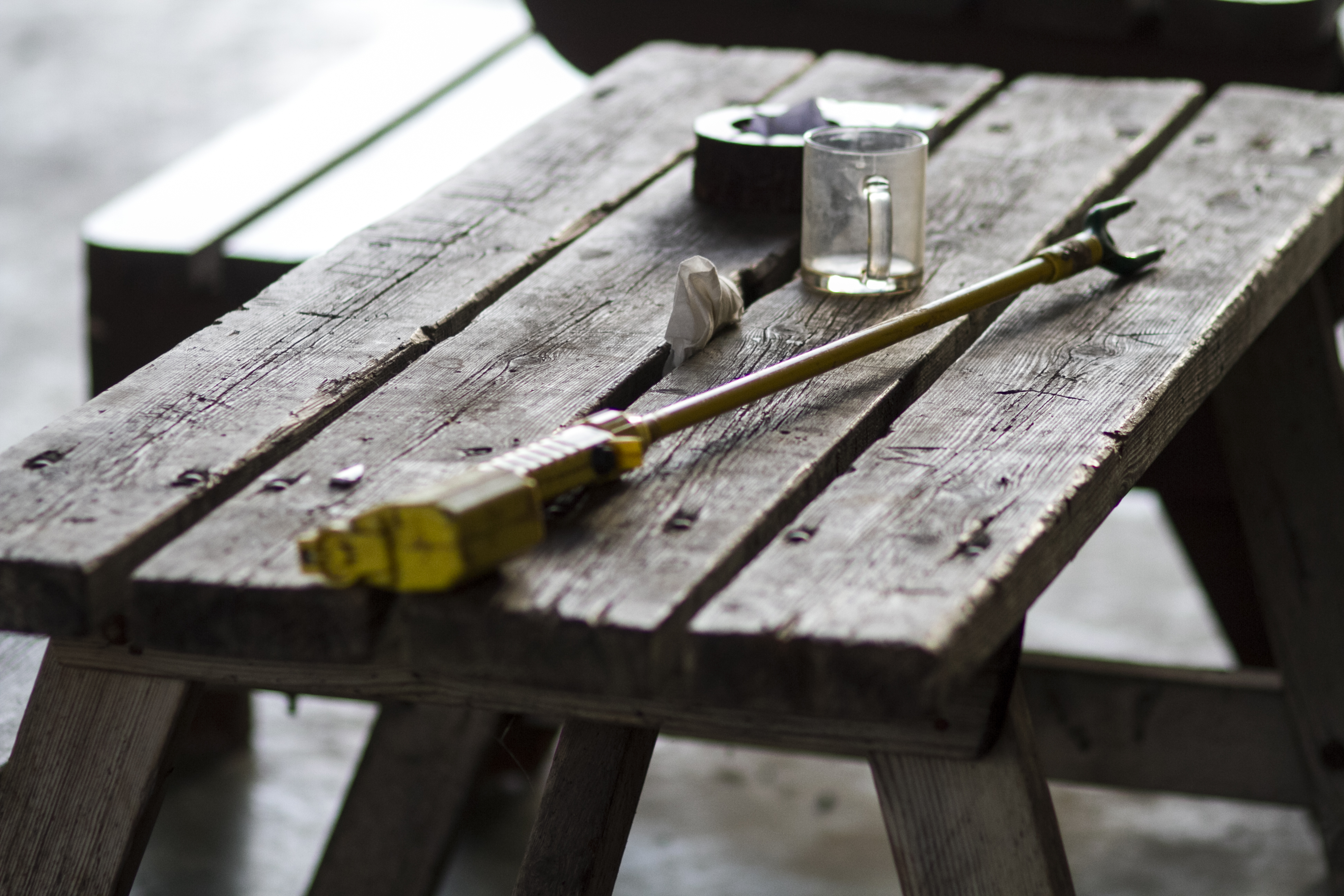
Electric cattle prod

An electric cattle prod is typically cylindrical, and can carry an open electric current through two metal electrodes at the "shock end" when activated. Anything that touches the electrodes receives a high-voltage, non-fatal low-current shock, strong enough to cause significant pain.

The electric cattle prod is designed to inflict a painful shock to cattle, and thus "prod" them along; the pain stimulates movement.

There are various designs of electric cattle prods. Their shape is designed to make them easy to use and handle. They range in length from six inches (usually of a more encased rectangular prism design like a stun gun), to up to six feet. Most are simple designs powered by 9-volt battery or similarly small batteries, to make them small and light enough to wield. One typical design is a box containing a large battery (or battery pack) at the handle end and wires embedded in a fibreglass rod, ending with two electrodes in a rubber tip.

As the precursor of the stun gun, cattle prods have a wide range of voltage with enough current to operate in the same manner as a stun gun does against humans.

The use of electric cattle prods has been debated by many people. Organizations such as PETA contend that the use of cattle prods is as much mentally harmful as it is physically. Most farmers contend that the short shock is minutely felt, and soon forgotten.

Some higher-voltage prods can interfere with radio reception when activated.

=== Usage on people in policing and torture ===
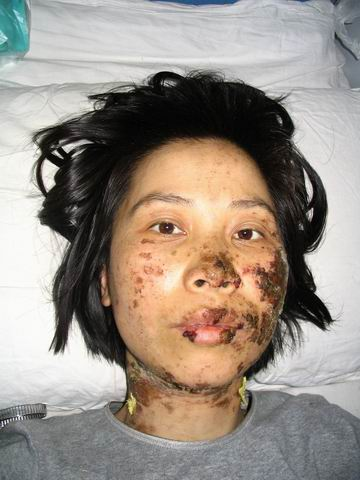
Chinese torture victim Gao Rongrong showing scars incurred from an electric baton.

Cattle prods today are designed with a high range of voltages and currents. If more powerful prods are applied continuously to the skin, the current eventually causes heating, searing, burning, and scarring of skin at the contact point. Electric prods have found favour with torturers.

Prior to the development of stun batons and the taser, electric cattle prods were also used on people in varying degrees. Their first common usage on people occurred during the Civil Rights Movement of the 1960s; prods were first adopted by police officers in Alabama to use on protesters and agencies elsewhere followed; Hotshot later developed an electric police baton.

The picana is an electric prod based originally on the cattle prod but designed specifically for human torture. It works at very high voltage and low current so as to maximize pain and minimize the physical marks left on the victim. Among its advantages over other torture devices is that it is portable, easy to use, and allows the torturer to localize the electric shocks to the most sensitive places on the body, where they cause intense pain that can be repeated many times.

Electric shock devices, including cattle prods, have been used as a means of coercive control on autistic and mentally handicapped people. Famous proponents of this practice include Matthew Israel and Ivar Lovaas. The use of electric shocks in this way has been condemned as torture by the United Nations special rapporteur, and the United States Food and Drug Administration issued a ban on all such electric shock devices in 2020.

On August 14, 2013 in Lakewood Township, New Jersey, gang leader Mendel Epstein told two undercover Federal Bureau of Investigation agents that he used a cattle prod to coerce Jewish husbands to grant religious divorces to their wives, leading the press to nickname him "The Prodfather". The cattle prod had been favored as a torture device by Epstein due to its effectiveness when used on cattle. He was convicted of conspiring to commit kidnapping, and sentenced to 10 years in prison.

== Alternatives ==
Cattle can be difficult to move and direct for a variety of reasons. Prods can be useful for moving stubborn or aggressive animals, but often cattle will not move forward when they are fearful of something they see, hear, or smell. Removal of these distractions or hiding them, such as with solid wall partitions, can greatly reduce animal-handling problems; however, cattle handlers cannot completely overcome the animal's decision not to move forward.

By studying the psychology of the animals and redesigning the working environment it is possible to handle the animals without the need for brute force and causing pain and suffering to the animal in many, but not all, cases. Significant work in this regard has been done by Colorado State University professor Temple Grandin to study how cattle perceive the environment around them and to design better livestock slaughterhouse handling systems that do not induce fear into the animal.

== See also ==
- Goad
- Mazzarella
- Shepherd's crook
- Graduated Electronic Decelerator
