= Mazzarella =

Livestock herding stick

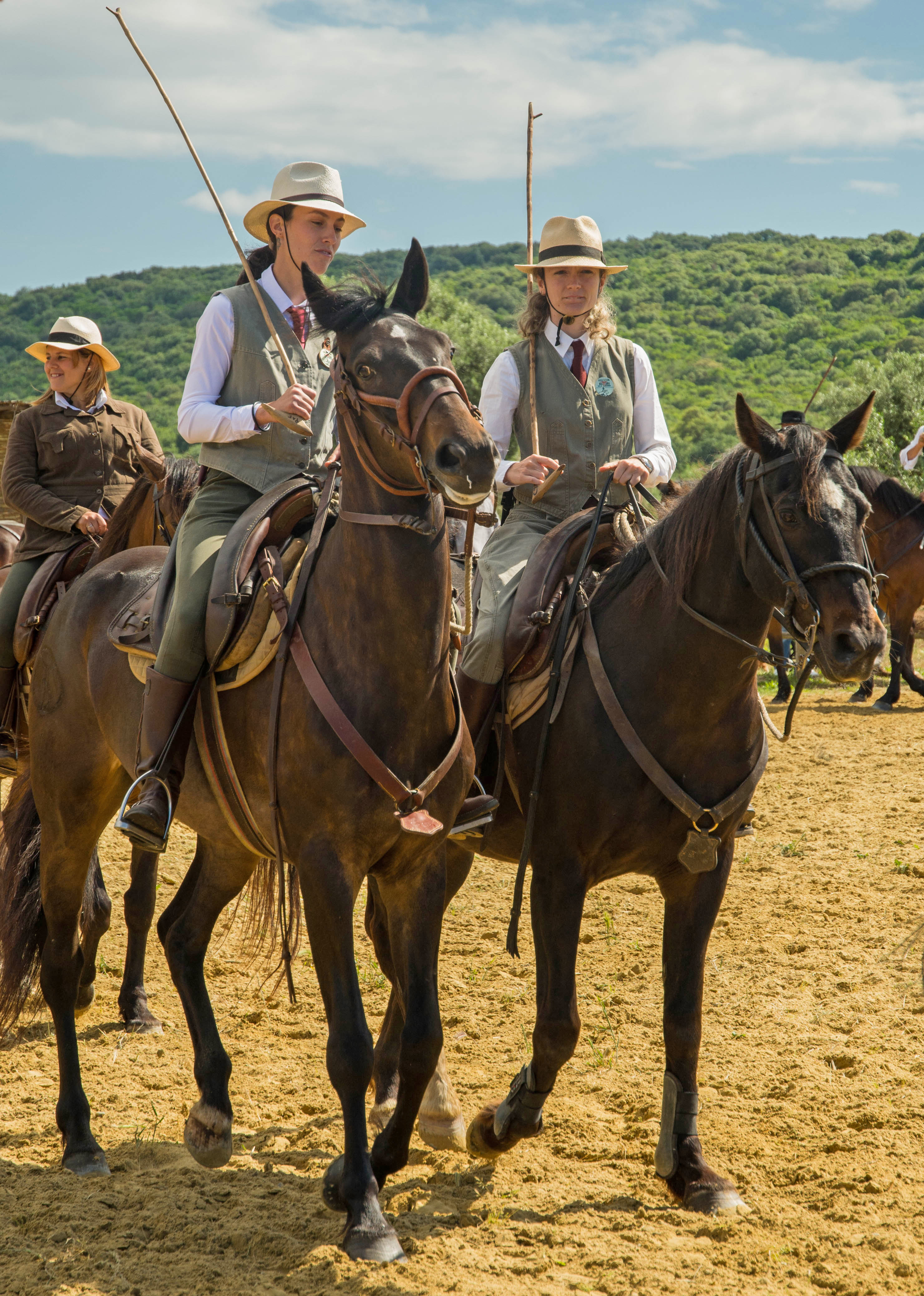
Butteri holding mazzarellas

A mazzarella is a stick used in northern Italy to herd cattle (such as oxen), sheep, and horses.

It is carried by a buttero, a cowboy or shepherd in the regions of Maremma, in Tuscany, and in the bordering zones of the Northern Latium.

Mazzarella is derived from the word mazza, the Italian word for mace. The mace was the primary weapon in Europe between the 12th and 16th centuries, and the area around Milan in northern Italy was a primary site of manufacture for the Italian mace that was most popular during this period.

Starting around the 15th to 16th century, the mace became a ceremonial symbol of authority, and has continued to be so at multiple European courts as well as in the U.S. Congress and at many universities.

The mazzarella, therefore, is a derivation that persists in Northern Italy both as a symbol of authority (for the cowboy or shepherd), as well as having an impetus and herding function.

== See also ==
- Cattle prod
- Goad
- Shepherd's crook
