= Shepherd's hat =

Head covering used by a shepherd

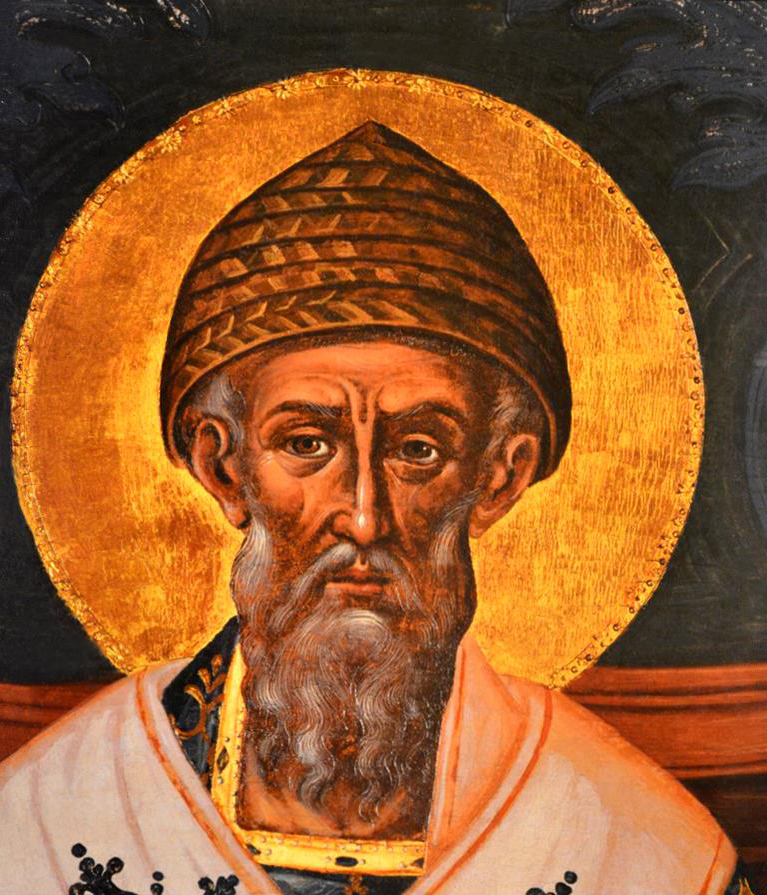
Saint Spyridon wearing a woven straw hat on his head – a traditional shepherd's hat in the shape of a skep, and a representation that he was a shepherd of God's people

A shepherd's hat is a head covering, used by a shepherd to ward off the sun and the elements. Along with a crook, it is an important tool for the shepherd.

Shepherding is ubiquitous across cultures, and is one of the world's oldest occupations, beginning some 5,000 years ago in Asia Minor. It has existed in agricultural communities around the world and is an important part of pastoralist animal husbandry. The image of the shepherd has been at the center of pastoral literature and art.

The work keeps the shepherd outdoors, and every culture has developed different headgear to protect the worker.

== Background ==
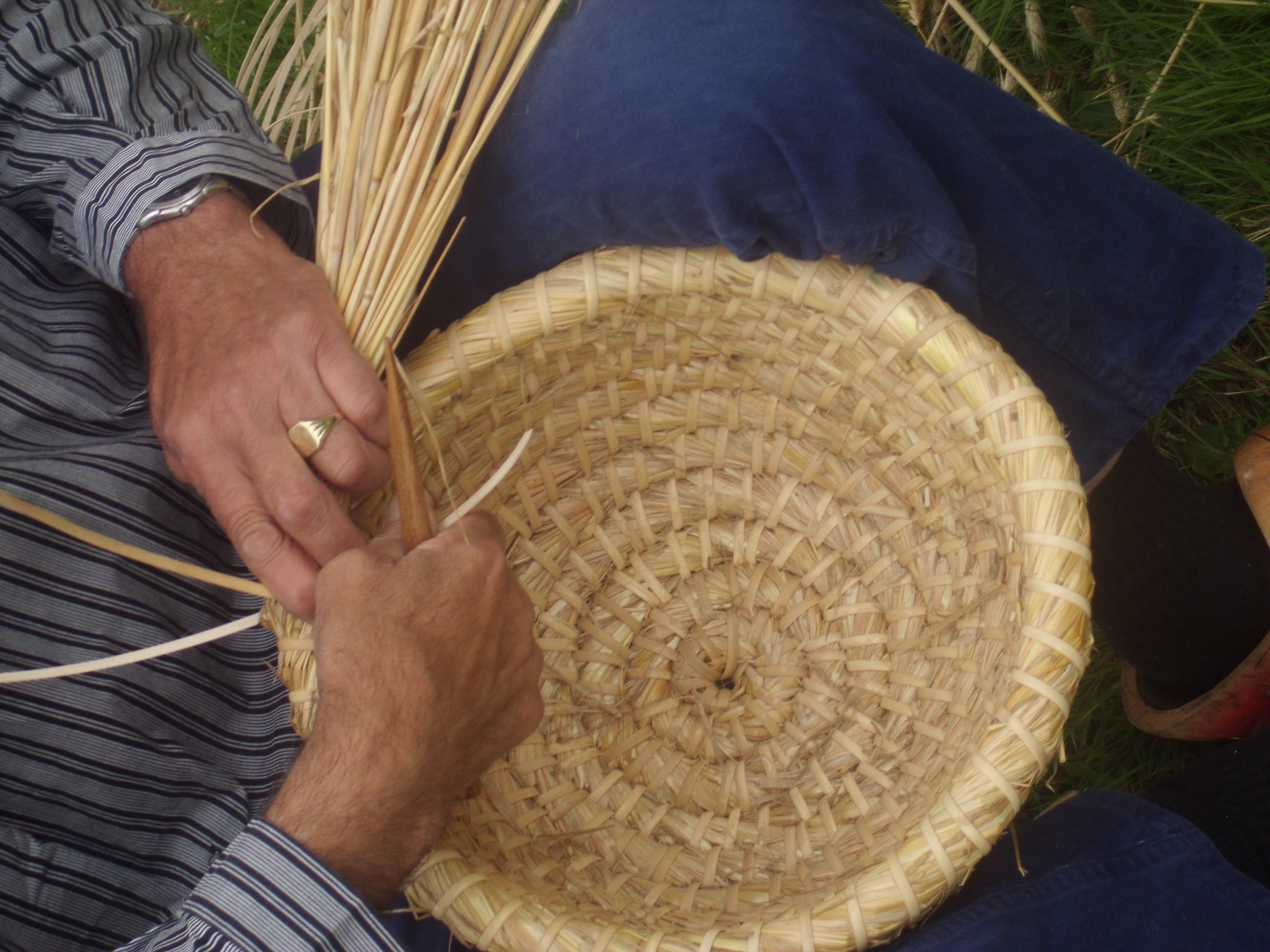
Making a skep

Given that most shepherds were poor, and lived in an agricultural setting, the shepherd's hat was usually simple and made from readily available materials. For example, wool is one of the oldest known textiles, and hats made from felt may have been known in ancient Sumer.

Historically, the wool knit cap has been a common form of headgear for shepherds, seamen, hunters and others spending their working day outdoors. Hats made from straw, both wide-brimmed and conical were also common. They have been worn throughout the world, with varying styles, all of them are woven using some form of plant fibre.

A chaperon is a utilitarian garment worn on the head in all parts of Western Europe in the Middle Ages.

The căciulă joasă is a cylindrical fur cap with the top larger than the base. It is worn by shepherds on both sides of the southern Carpathians (in Mărginimea Sibiului, Oltenia, Muntenia and Vrancea) and also in Bărăgan Plain and Dobruja due to this area being used for summer pastures by the Carpathian shepherds, and also in Maramureș.

The pakol is a soft round-topped men's cap, typically of wool from Pakistan, worn by shepherds in northwestern Pakistan southeast Afghanistan.

== In popular culture ==
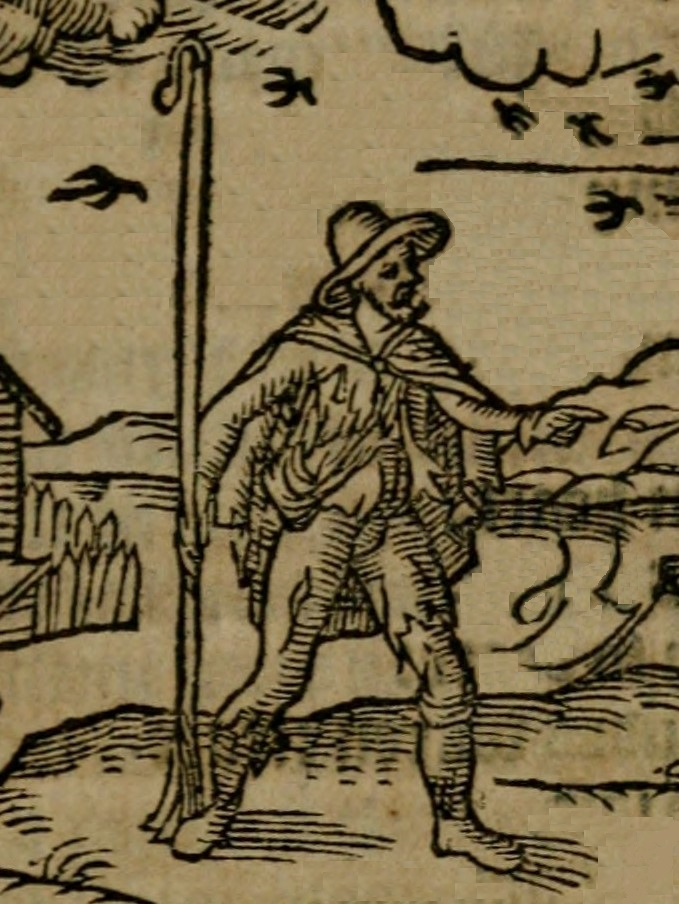
Edmund Spenser's The Shepheardes Calender

Cathy Shrank and Raphael Lyne discuss the headwear of farmers and shepherds in Elizabethan England in the poem, A Lover's Complaint.

Upon her head a platted hive of straw,
Which fortified her visage from the sun

— A Lover's Complaint, William Shakespeare

According to Shrank and Lyne, a "plaited hive of straw" is a woven straw hat, the kind worn by country folk. An example can be seen in Edmund Spenser's The Shepheardes Calender. The scholars also note that "hive" is not a word generally used to describe headgear but may have been used because the hat resembles a beehive, which were conical and made of straw.

The image of the shepherd is a theme found throughout the Bible, and is a symbol that God acts as the Shepherd of His people. This can be represented by the shepherd's hat.

== Gallery ==
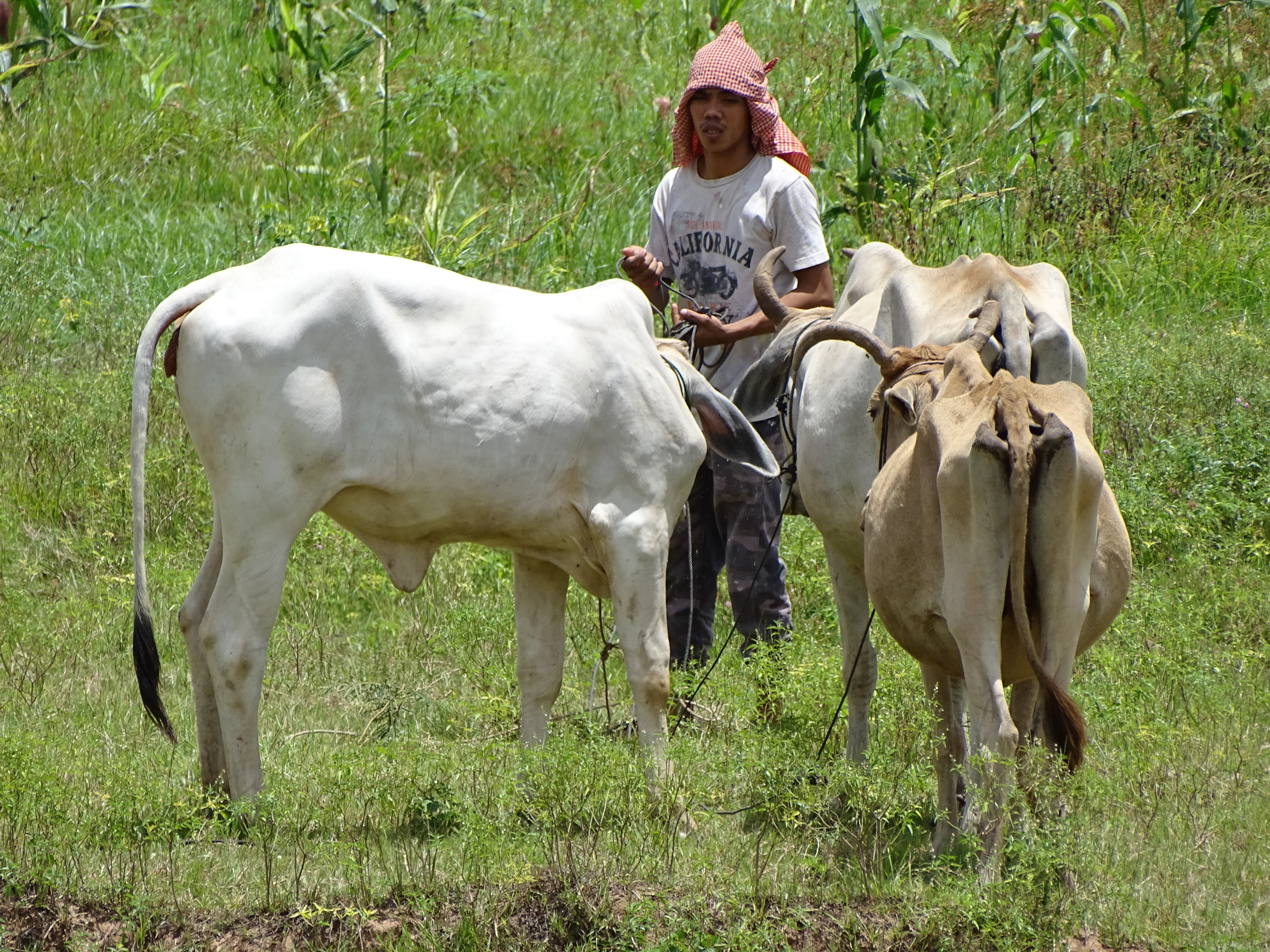
Cambodian shepherd

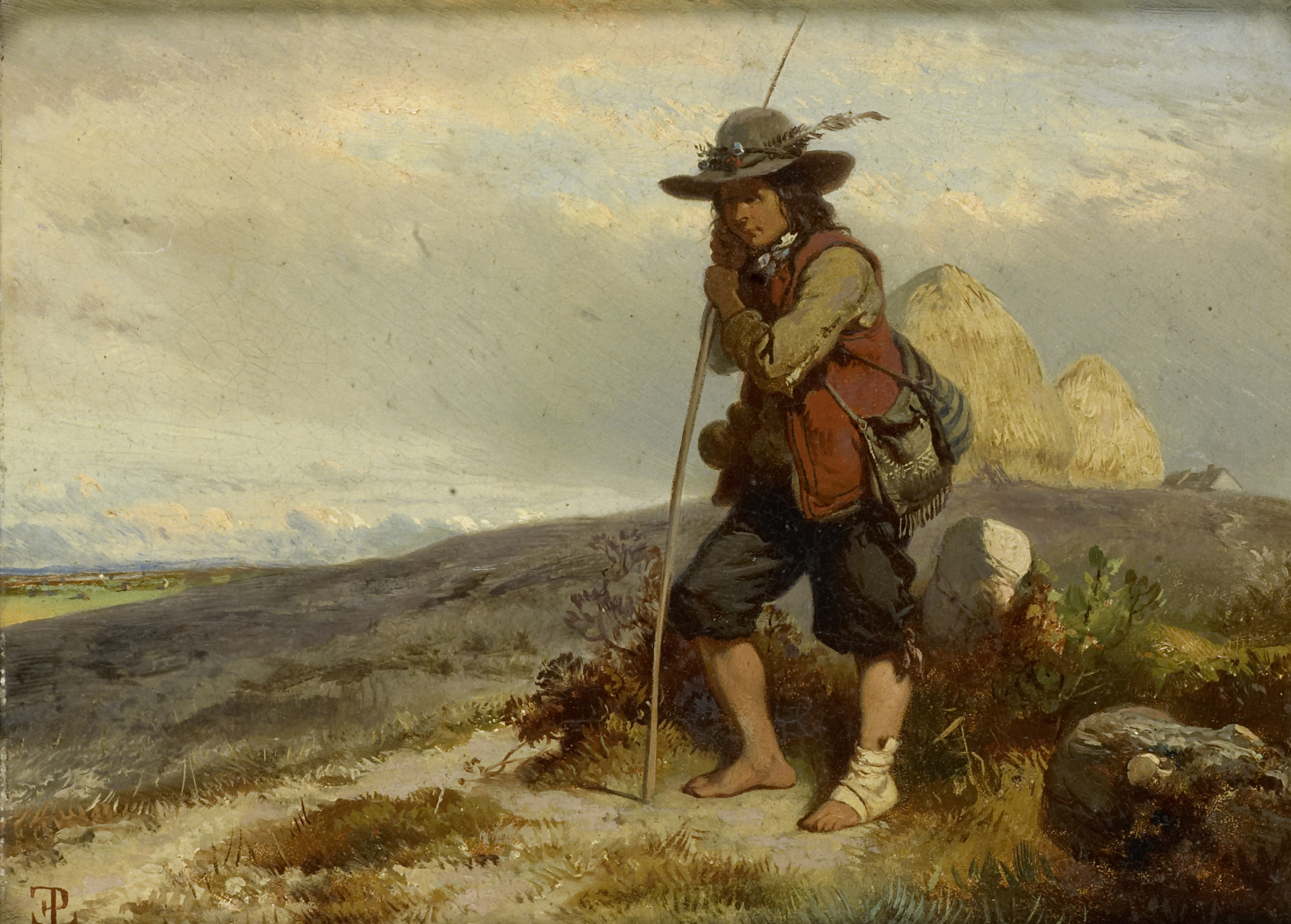
Dutch shepherd

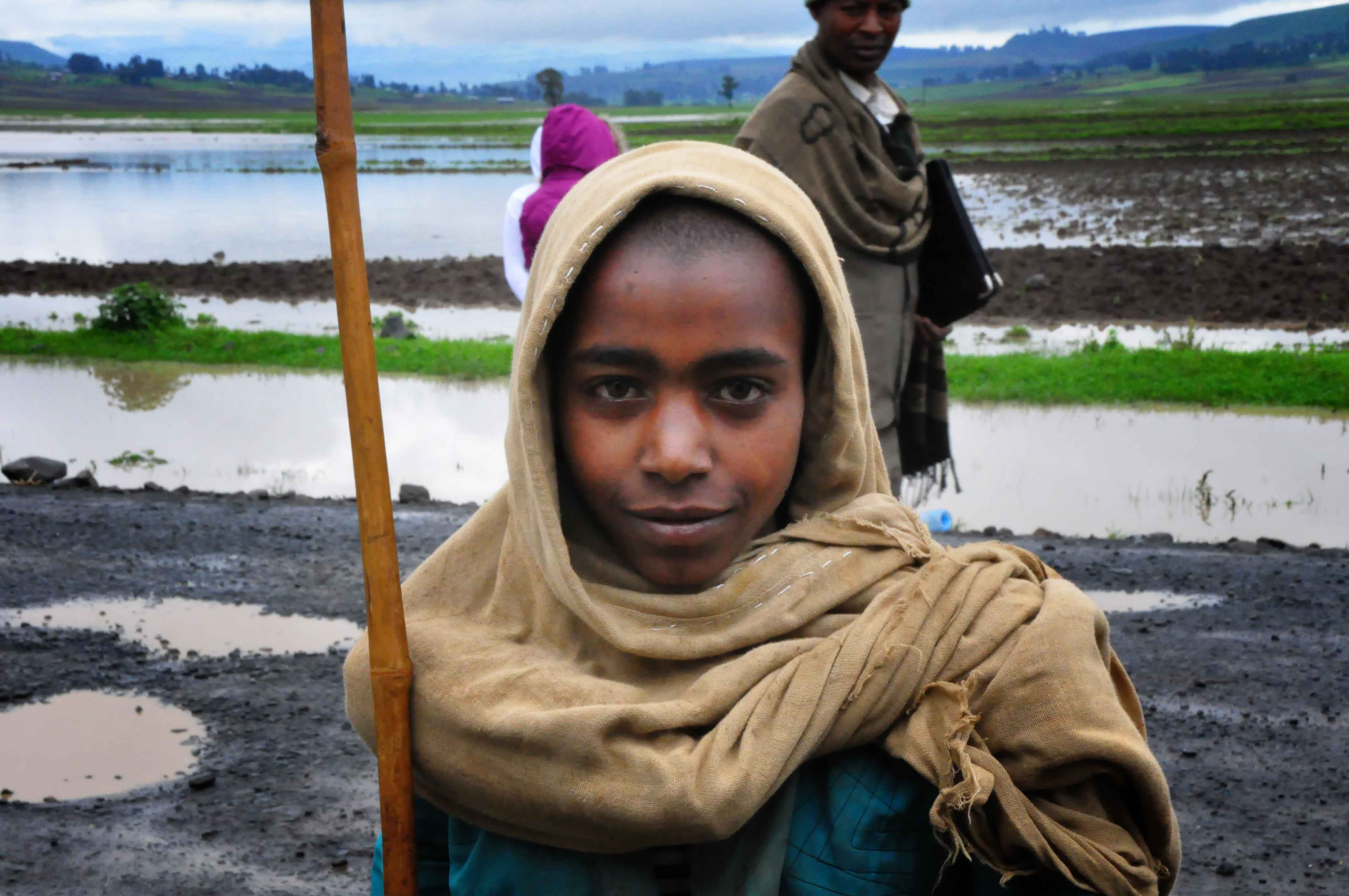
Ethiopian shepherd

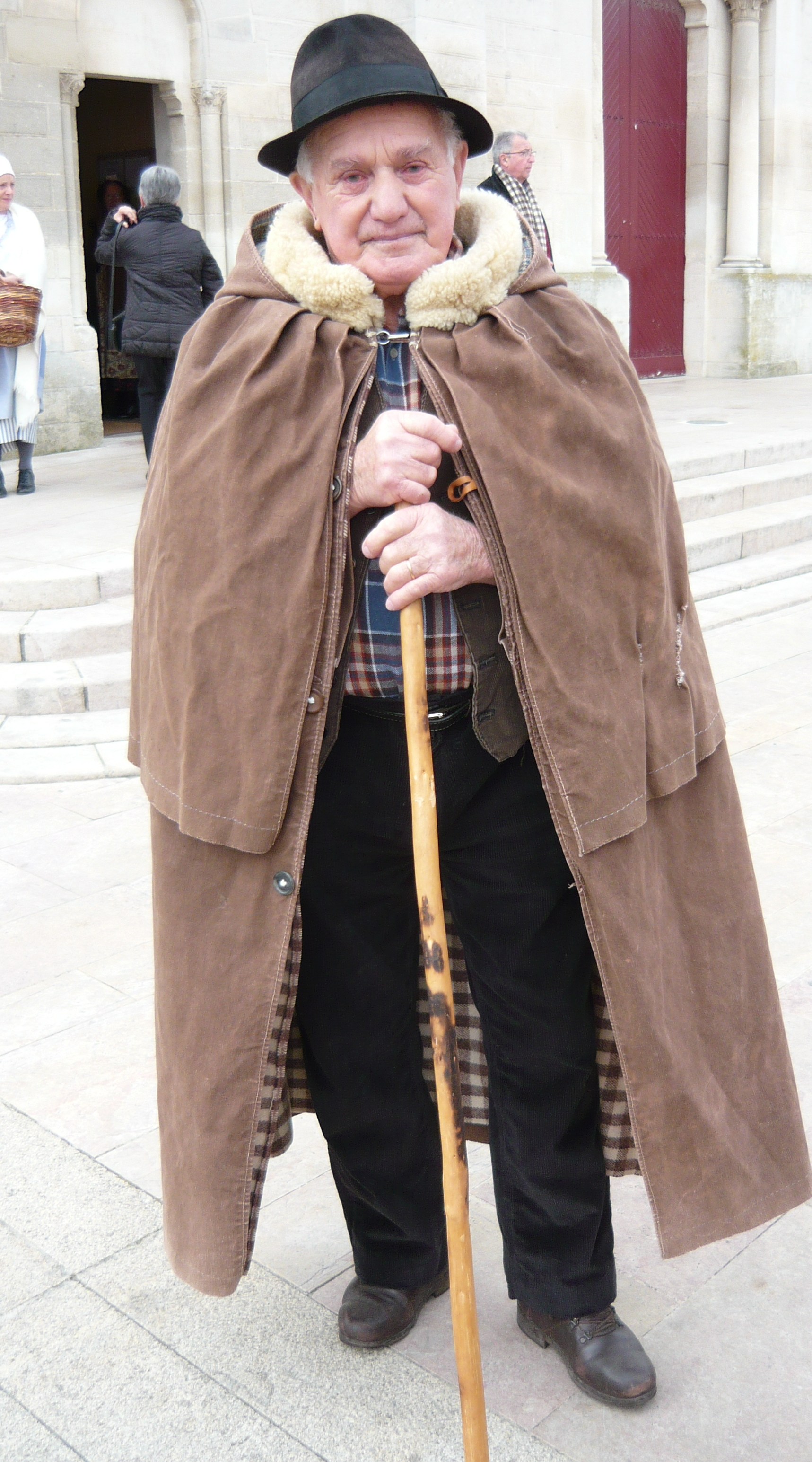
French shepherd

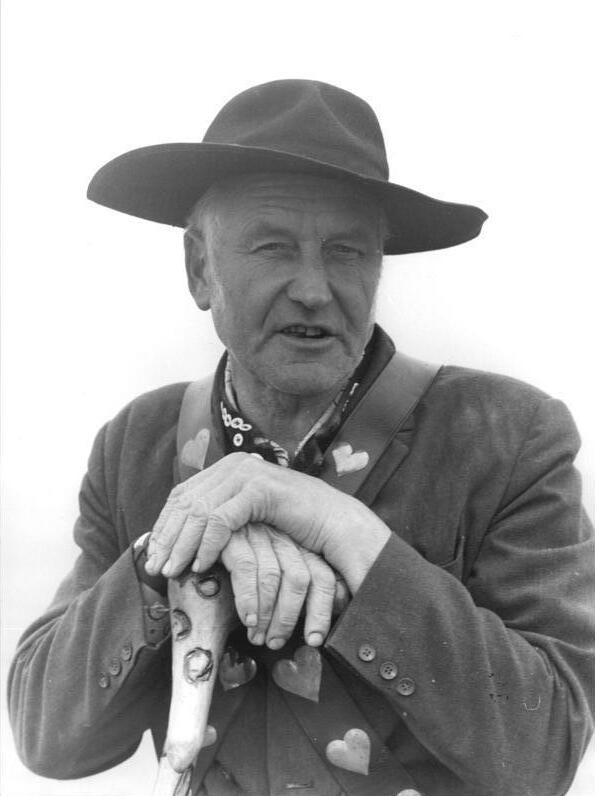
German shepherd

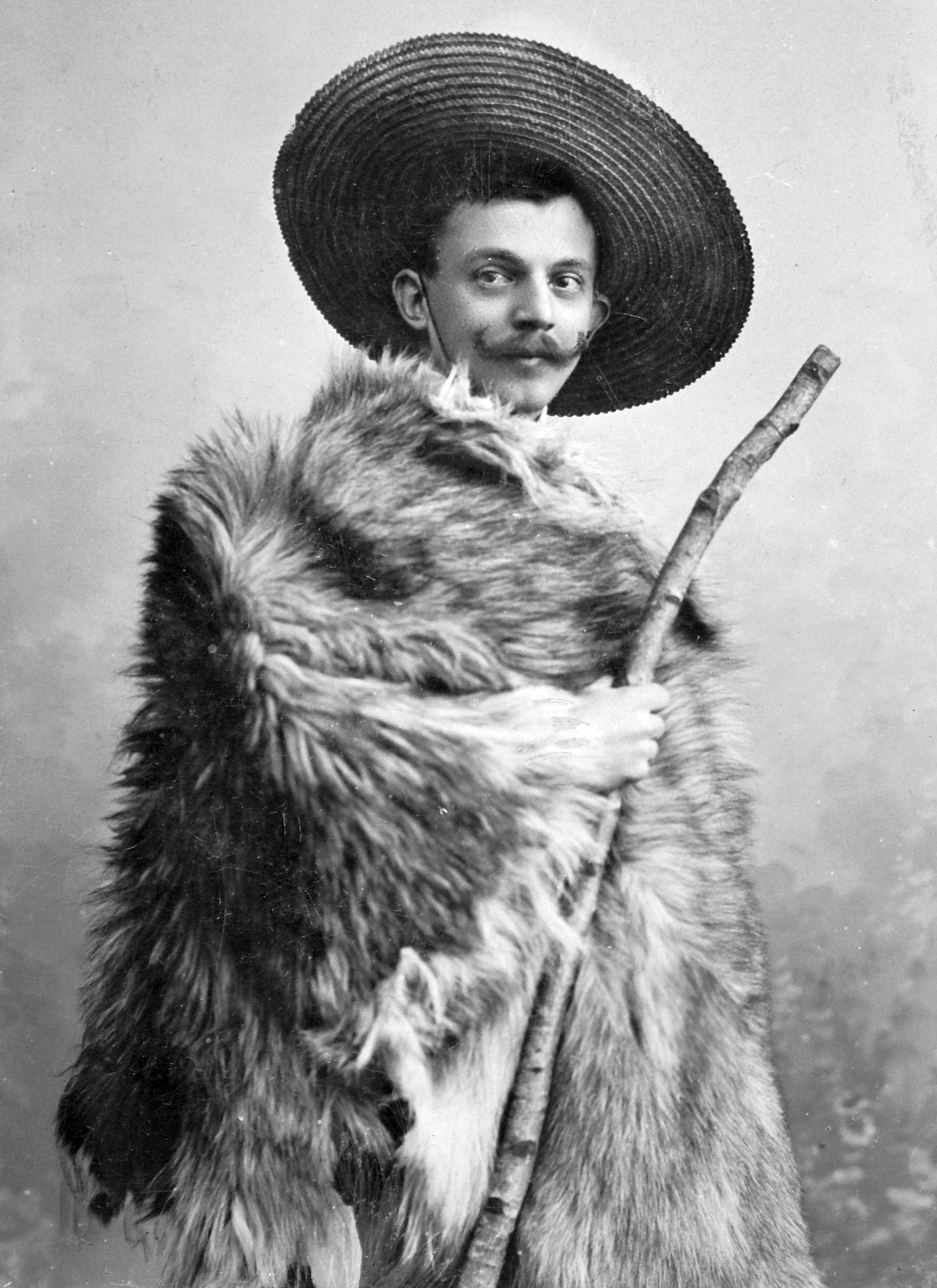
Hungarian shepherd

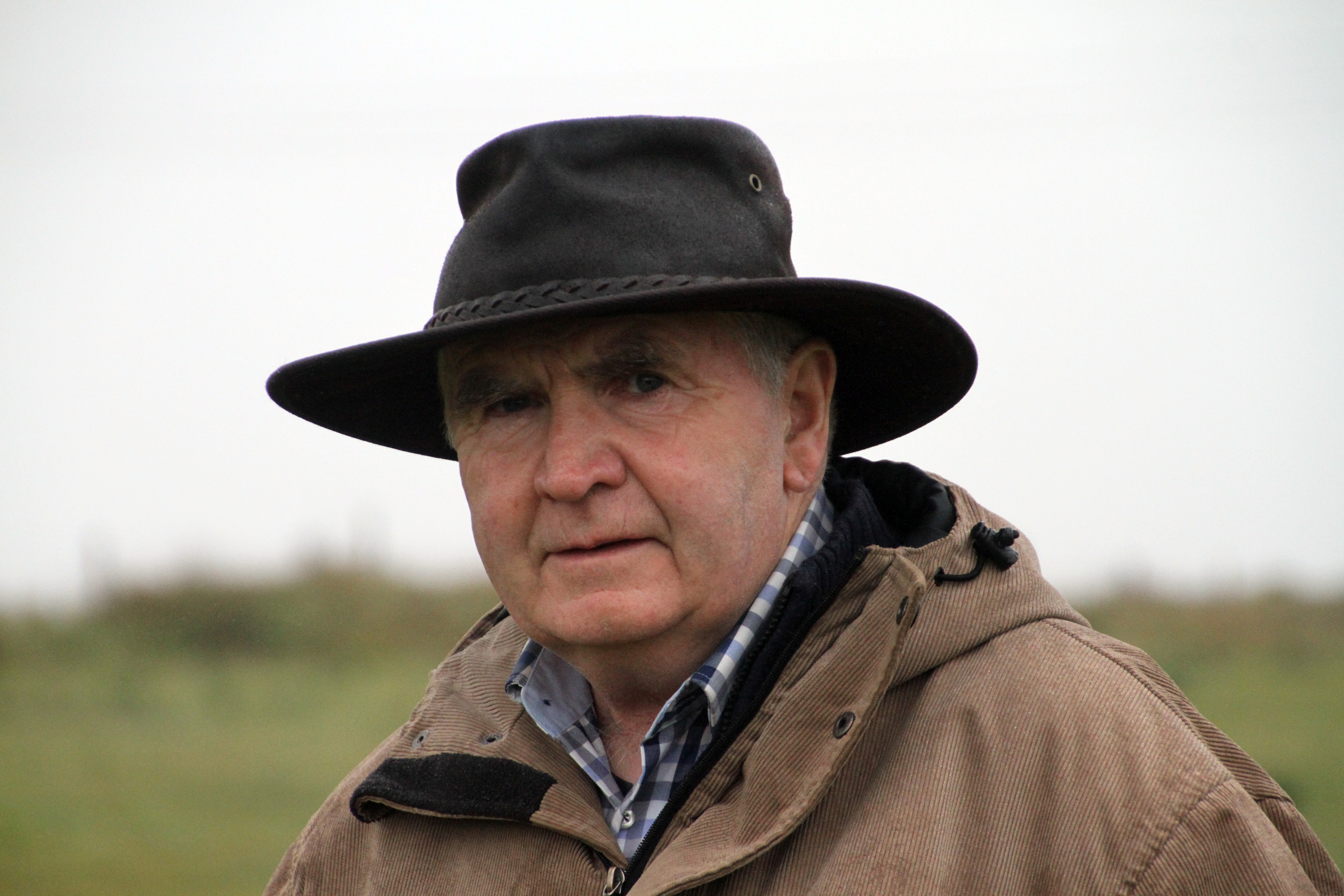
Irish shepherd

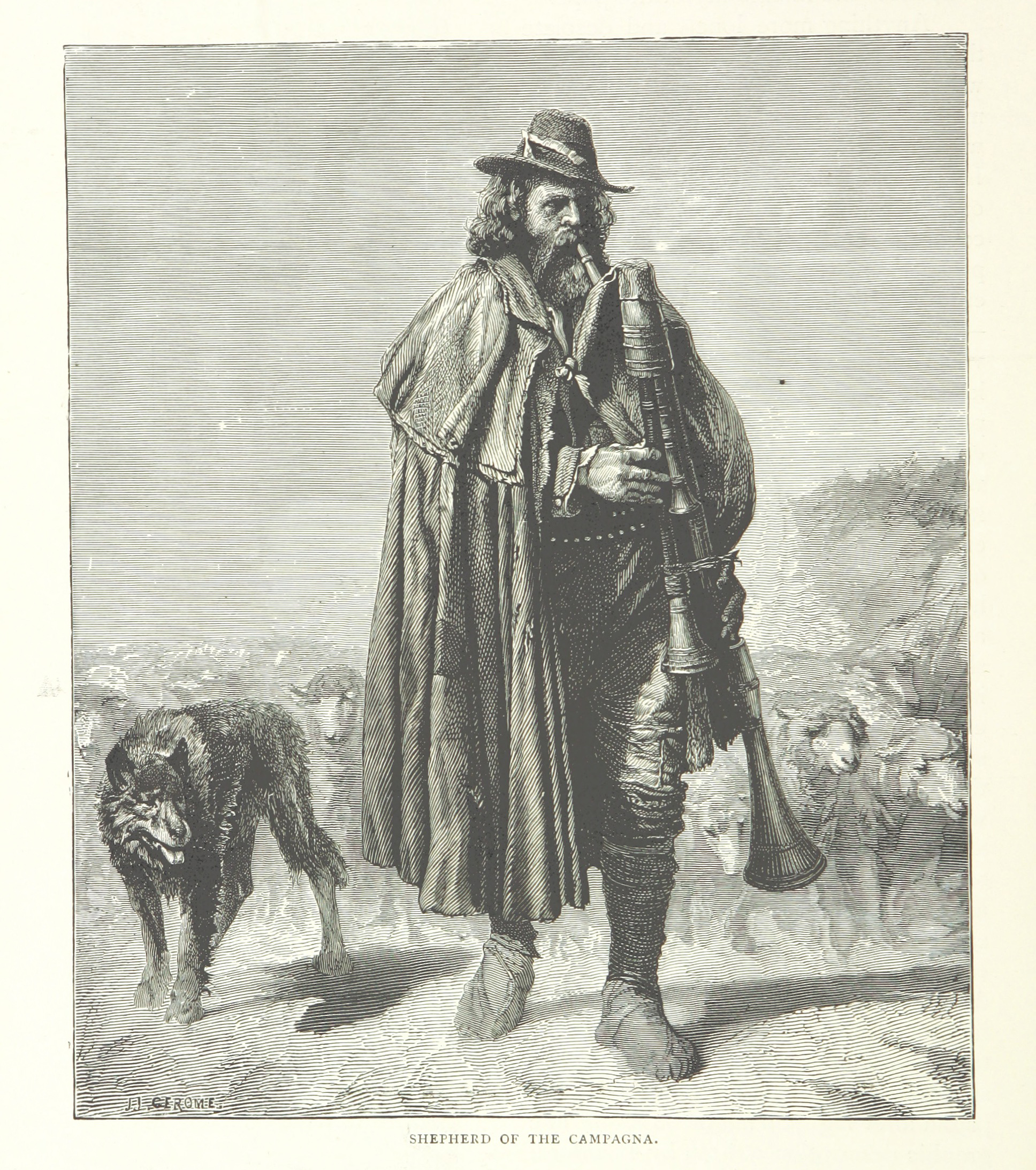
Italian shepherd

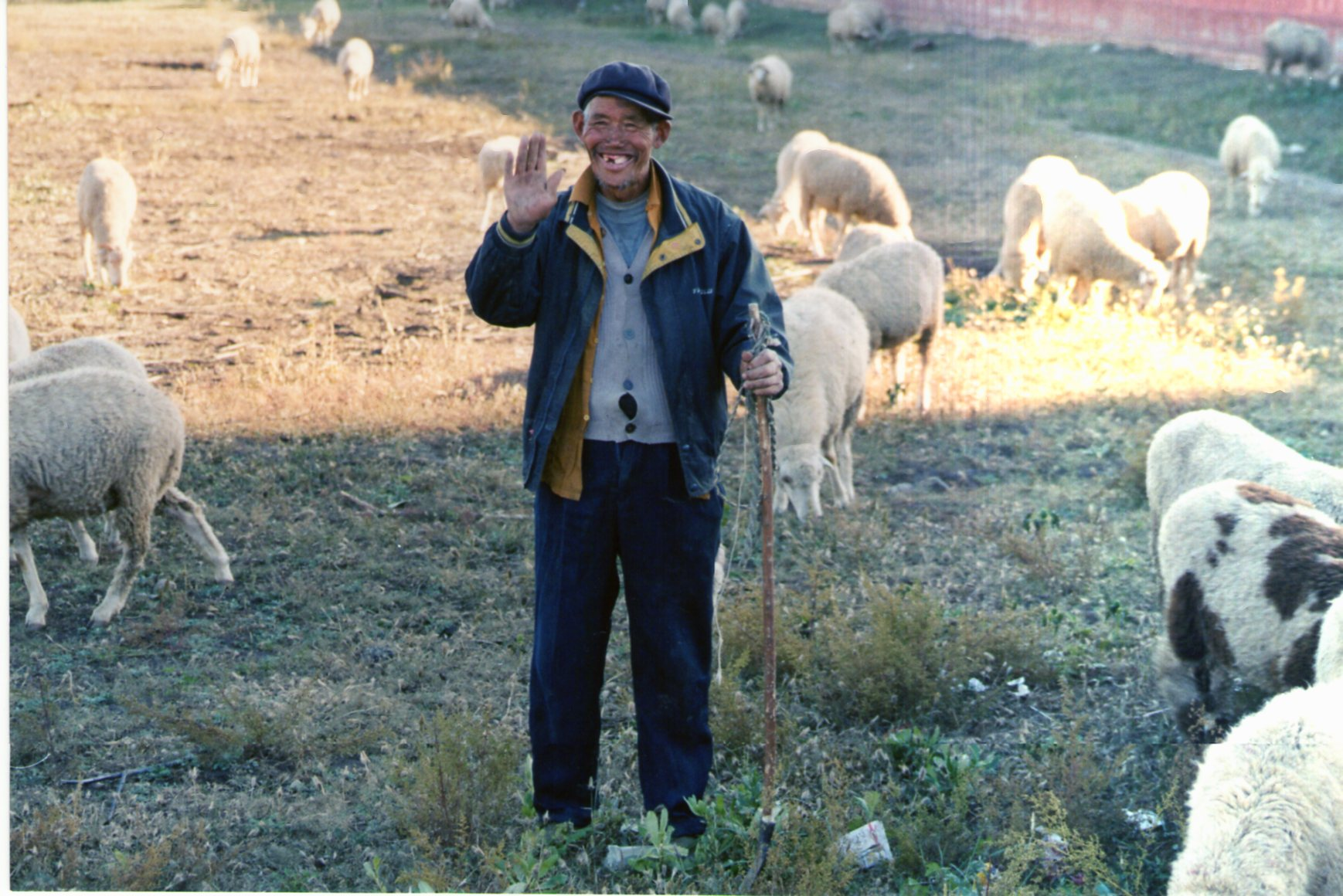
Mongolian shepherd

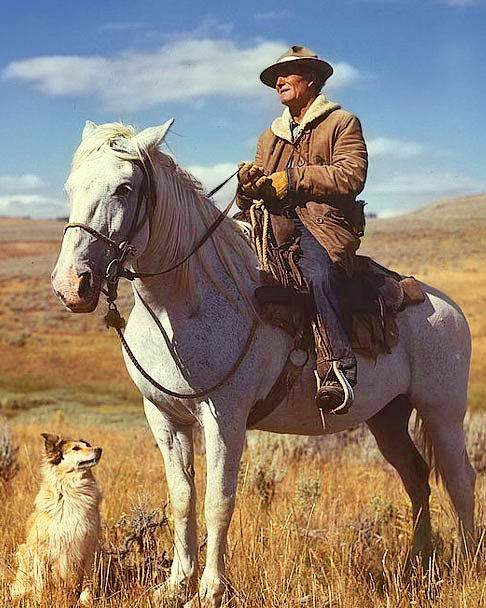
Shepherd in Montana in 1942

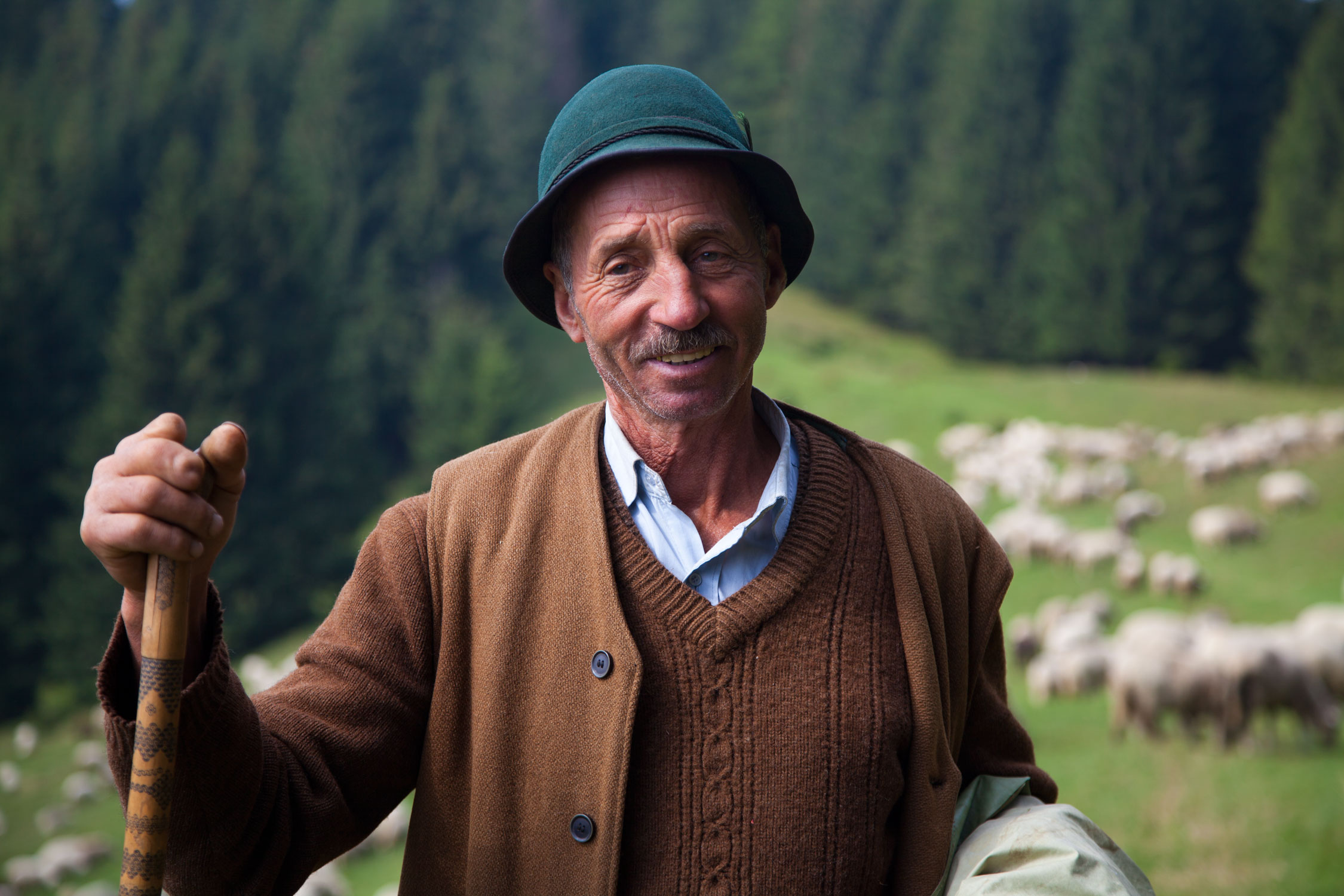
Shepherd in the Carpathian Mountains

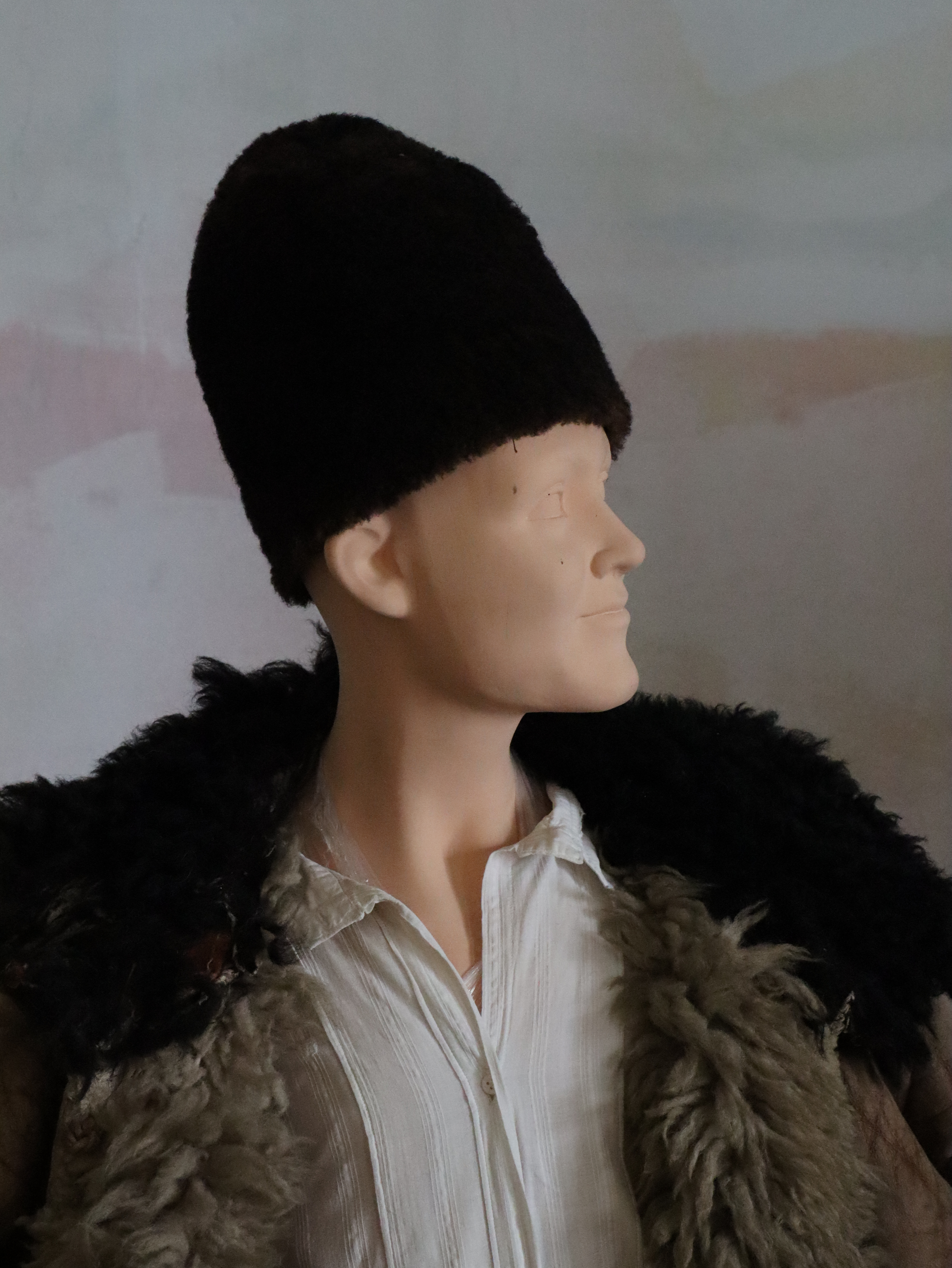
Serbian shepherd clothing

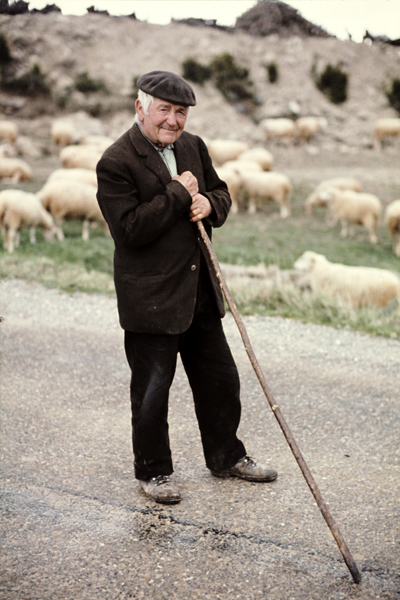
Spanish shepherd

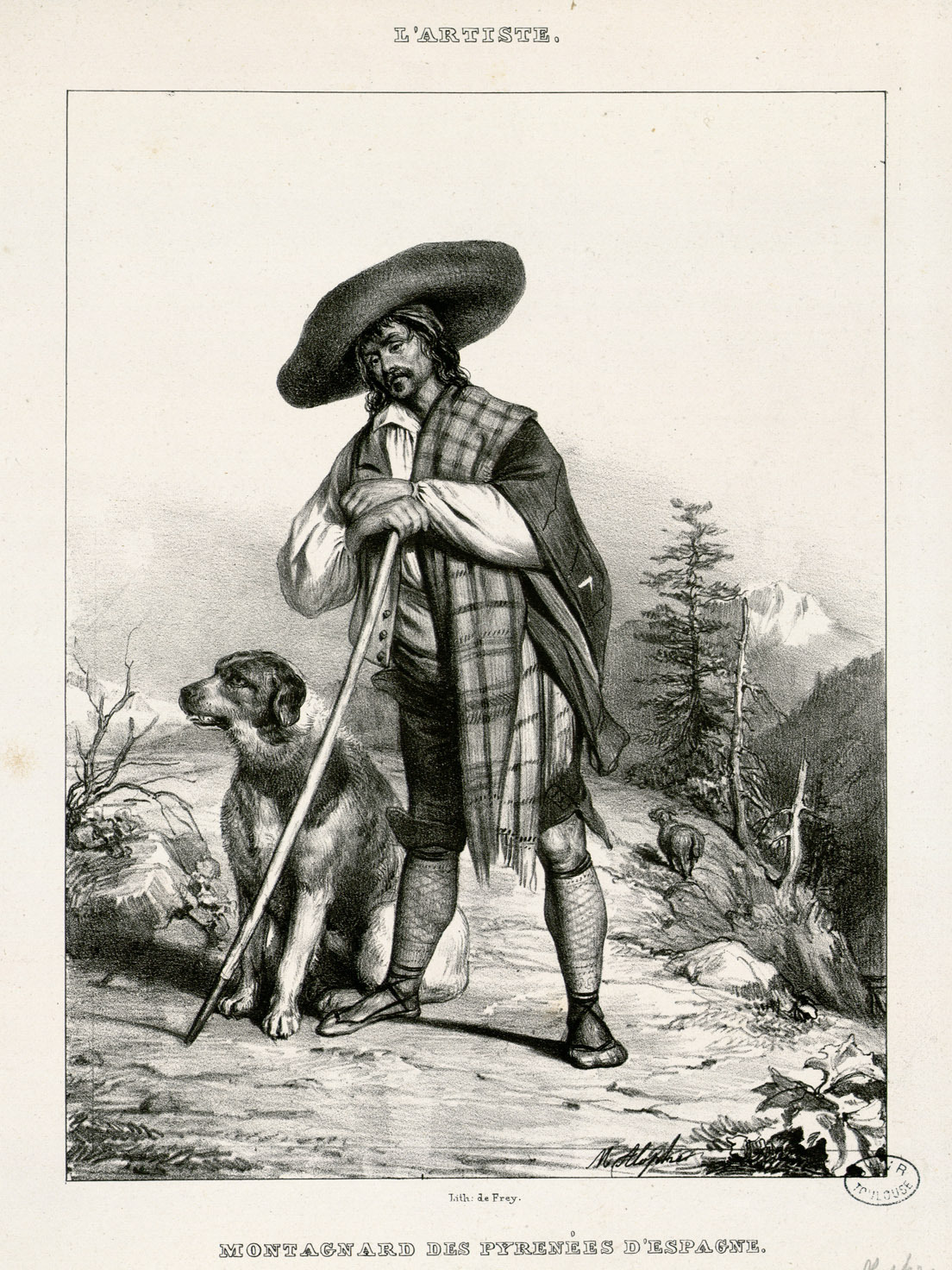
Spanish shepherd in the Pyrenees

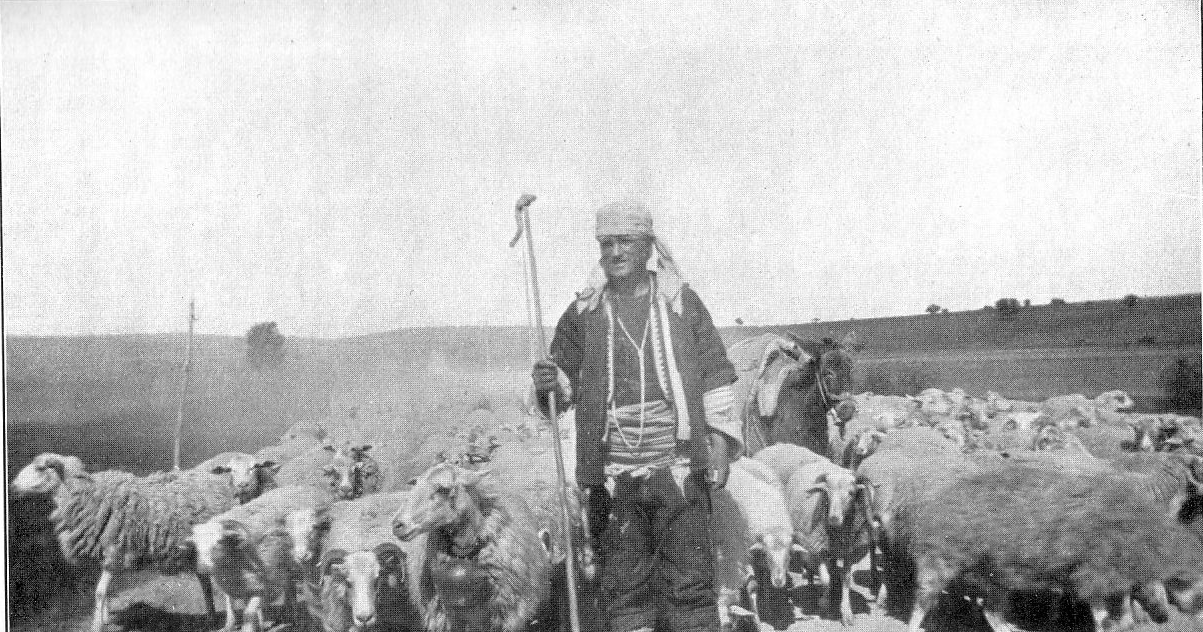
Turkish shepherd circa 1926

== See also ==
- cowboy hat
- Kausia
- Mokorotlo
- Papakha

== Bibliography ==
- Chohan, Amar Singh (1989). A History of Kafferistan: Socio-economic and Political Conditions of the Kaffers. Atlantic Publishers & Distri.
- Copeland, L.; Wescombe, P. (1966). Inventory of Stone-Age Sites in Lebanon: North, South and East-Central Lebanon. Impr. Catholique.
- Hagen, Chad Alice (2005). Fabulous Felt Hats: Dazzling Designs from Handmade Felt. Lark Books. ISBN 978-1-57990-542-2.
- Kula, E. (June 30, 1994). Our Economic World: A Study of the World's Natural Resources and Industries. ISBN 978-0-412-57640-9.
- Reed, SD (1992). From Chaperones to Chaplets:Aspects of Men's Headdress 1400–1519 (M.S. thesis). University of Maryland. Archived from the original on March 8, 2011. "NB Headgear Reed categorises as Hoods, Chaperones, & (some) Sack Hats are all covered by this article"
- Shrank, Cathy; Lyne, Raphael (November 2, 2017). The Complete Poems of Shakespeare. ISBN 9781317481362.
