= Crook and flail =

Symbols of ancient Egyptian royalty

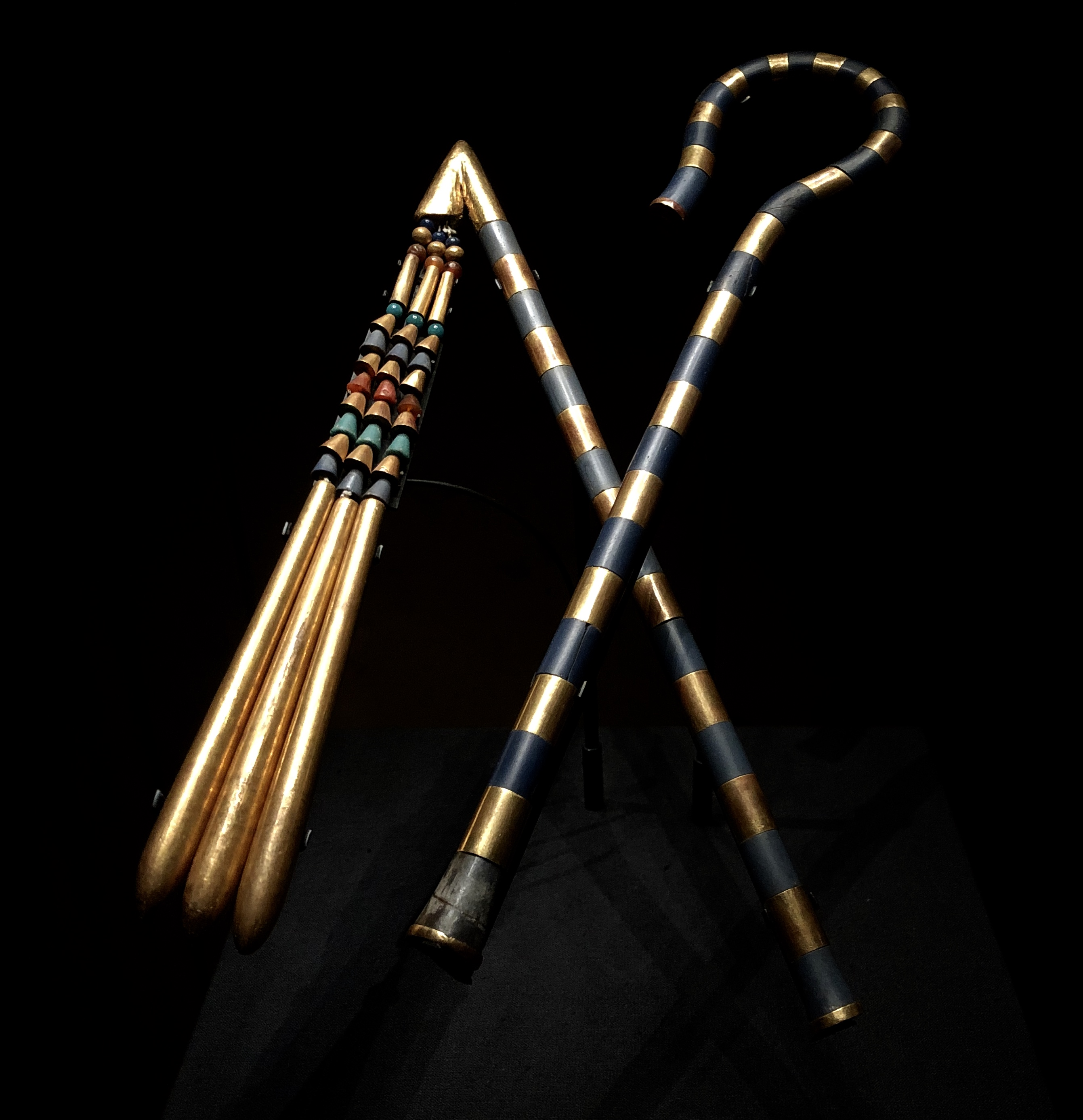
Crook and flail of Tutankhamun (14th century BC)

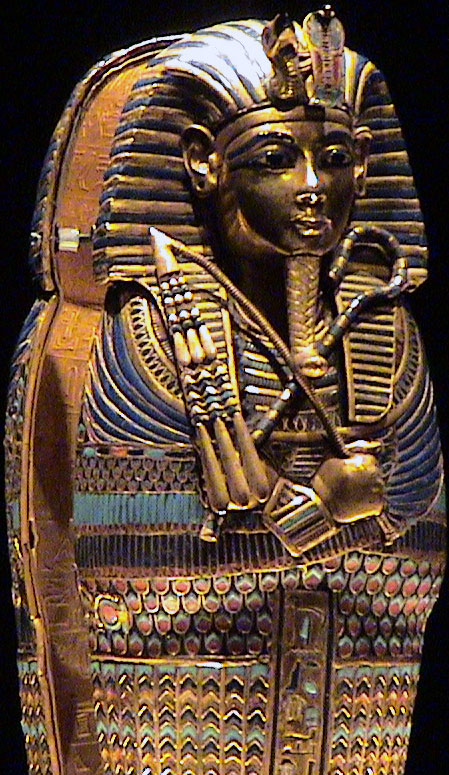
The crook and flail on the coffinette of Tutankhamun

S38
crook
in hieroglyphs

S45
"flail"
in hieroglyphs

The crook and flail (heka and nekhakha) were symbols used in ancient Egyptian society. They were originally the attributes of the deity Osiris that became insignia of pharaonic authority. The shepherd's crook stood for kingship and the flail for the fertility of the land.

The earliest known example of a crook is from the Gerzeh culture (Naqada II), and comes from tomb U547 in Abydos. By late Predynastic times, the shepherd's crook was already an established symbol of rule. The flail initially remained separate, being depicted alone in some earliest representations of royal ceremonial. Approximately by the time of the Second Dynasty, the crook and flail became paired.

The only extant pharaonic examples of both the crook and flail come from the Tomb of Tutankhamun. Their staffs are made of heavy bronze covered with alternating stripes of blue glass, obsidian, and gold, while the flail's beads are made of gilded wood.

== Theories on significance ==
Traditionally crossed over the chest when held, they probably represented the ruler as a shepherd whose beneficence is formidably tempered by might.

In the interpretation of Toby Wilkinson, the flail used to goad livestock was a symbol of the ruler's coercive power: as shepherd of his flock, the ruler encouraged his subjects as well as restrained them. Still another interpretation, by E. A. Wallis Budge, is that the flail is what was used to thresh grain.

Percy Newberry, a specialist on ancient Egypt, speculated that the "flail" or "whip/scourge" of Osiris was more likely an instrument for collecting labdanum similar to that used in nineteenth-century Crete. He examined archaeological remains of such items and their representations in art, and found that they were mechanically incapable of acting as either a flail or whip and so must be some other instrument. Similarly to crooks, he further noted that these items were also associated with shepherds, who used them to gather labdanum while their flocks grazed on and among the bushes from which the gum was gathered.

== See also ==
- Sekhem scepter
- Was scepter
- Pharaoh-seated, with flail & red crown (hieroglyph)
